= 1879 United States Senate election in New York =

- January 21, 1879

Majority vote of each house needed to win
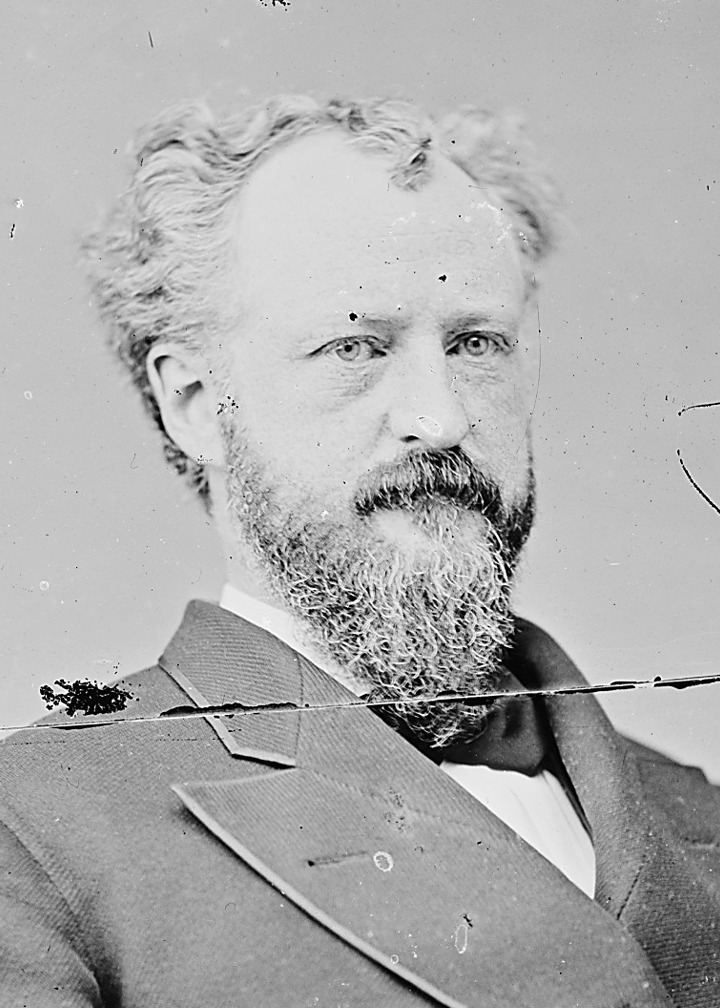

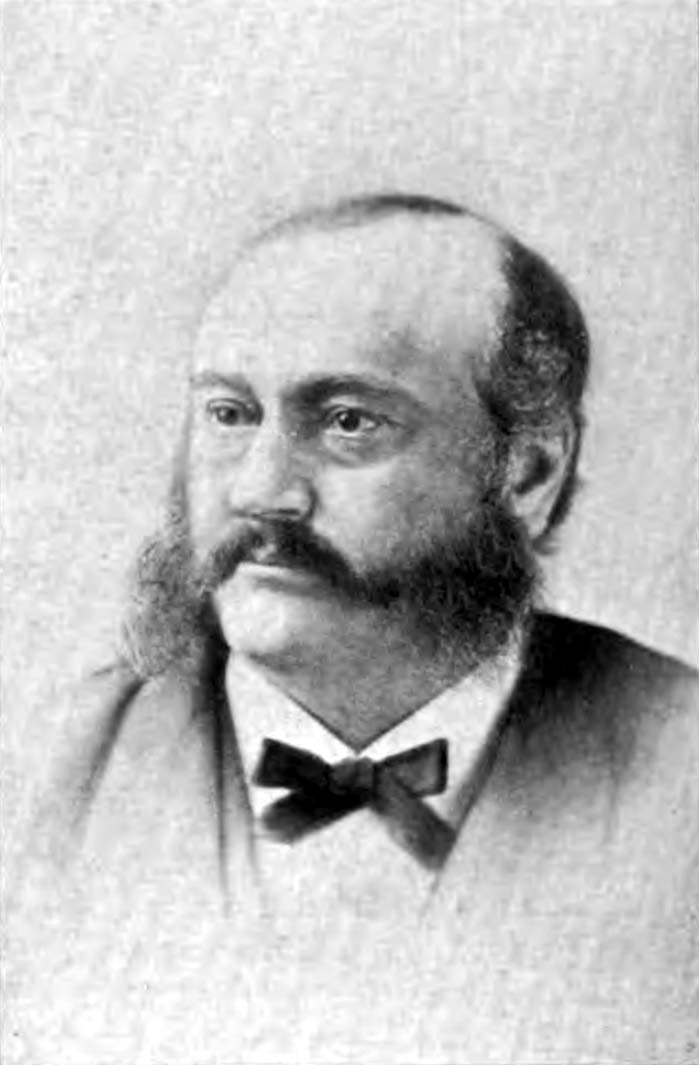
Nominee	Roscoe Conkling	William Dorsheimer
Party	Republican	Democratic
Senate	20	12
Percentage	62.5%	37.5%
Assembly	95	23
Percentage	74.22%	17.97%
Senator before election
Roscoe Conkling
Republican
Elected Senator
Roscoe Conkling
Republican

The 1879 United States Senate election in New York was held on January 21, 1879, by the New York State Legislature to elect a U.S. senator (Class 3) to represent the State of New York in the United States Senate.

== Background ==
Republican Roscoe Conkling had been re-elected in January 1873 to this seat, and his term would expire on March 3, 1879.

At the State election in November 1877, 19 Republicans and 13 Democrats were elected for a two-year term (1878–1879) in the State Senate. At the State election in November 1878, 97 Republicans, 28 Democrats and 3 Greenbackers were elected for the session of 1879 to the Assembly, and Republican Thomas Murphy was elected to fill the vacancy in the State Senate caused by the death of Democrat John Morrissey. The 102nd New York State Legislature met from January 7 to May 22, 1879, at Albany, New York.

== Candidates ==
=== Republican caucus ===
The caucus of Republican State legislators met on January 20, Temporary President of the State Senate William H. Robertson presided. Present were all Republican legislators except State Senator Louis S. Goebel (6th D.) and Assemblyman James W. Wadsworth. They re-nominated the incumbent U.S. Senator Conkling unanimously.

=== Democratic caucus ===
The caucus of the Democratic State legislators met also on January 20. State Senator Thomas C. E. Ecclesine (8th D.) offered to adopt a prostest against the senatorial election proceedings, claiming that the senatorial and assembly districts were incorrectly apportioned and thus the State Legislature did not represent the wish of the people of the State. The protest was substituted by a resolution to appoint a committee which would elaborate an address on the apportionment at a later date. Ecclesine then marched out, and the remaining legislators nominated Lieutenant Governor William Dorsheimer for the U.S. Senate.

1879 Democratic caucus for United States Senator result
Office	Candidate	First ballot	Second ballot
U.S. Senator	William Dorsheimer	11	18
	James F. Starbuck	8	8
	DeWitt C. West	8	6
	Elijah Ward	2	

=== Greenback ===
The two Greenback assemblymen John Banfield (Chemung Co.) and George E. Williams (Oswego Co.) voted for 87-year-old Peter Cooper, a New York City inventor, industrialist and philanthropist who had run for U.S. president in 1876 on the Greenback ticket.

== Result ==
Roscoe Conkling was the choice of both the Assembly and the State Senate, and was declared elected.

1879 United States Senator election result
Office	House	Republican		Democrat		Greenback	
U.S. Senator	State Senate (32 members)	Roscoe Conkling	20	William Dorsheimer	12		
	State Assembly (128 members)	Roscoe Conkling	95	William Dorsheimer	23	Peter Cooper	2

Note: The votes were cast on January 21, but both Houses met in a joint session on January 22 to compare nominations, and declare the result.

== Aftermath ==
Conkling remained in office until May 17, 1881, when he resigned in protest against the distribution of federal patronage in New York by President James A. Garfield without being consulted. The crisis between the Stalwart and the Half-Breed factions of the Republican party arose when the leader of the New Yorker Half-Breeds William H. Robertson was appointed Collector of the Port of New York, a position Conkling wanted to give to one of his Stalwart friends.

== See also ==
- United States Senate elections, 1878 and 1879

== Sources ==
- VICTORIOUS REPUBLICANS in NYT on November 6, 1878 [gives 1 Greenbacker elected, but Williams of Oswego is not in the list; this seems to have been a preliminary result which was later amended]
- NEW-YORK'S NEXT SENATOR; ROSCOE CONKLING RENOMINATED in NYT on January 21, 1879
- THE DEMOCRATIC CAUCUS.; A REMARKABLE PROTEST OFFERED AND TABLED; LIEUT.-GOV. DORSHEIMER TENDERED THE EMPTY HONOR OF A NOMINATION in NYT on January 21, 1879
- CONKLING WINS THE SENATORSHIP in NYT on January 22, 1879
- CHOOSING THEIR SENATORS.; ...LIEUT.-GOV. DORSHEIMER FORMALLY ANNOUNCES THE ELECTION in NYT on January 23, 1879
