= 102nd New York State Legislature =

New York state legislative session

←	101st	103rd	→
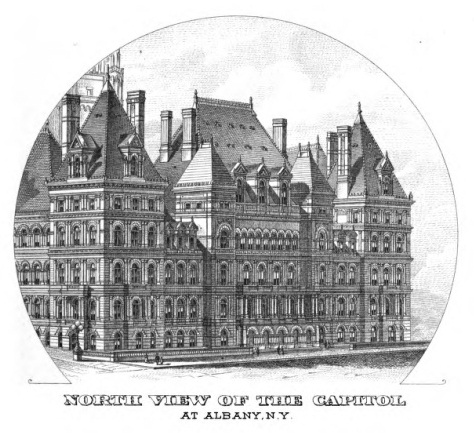
- New York State Capitol (1879)

Overview
- Legislative body: New York State Legislature
- Jurisdiction: New York, United States
- Term: January 1 – December 31, 1879

Senate
- Members: 32
- President: Lt. Gov. William Dorsheimer (D)
- Temporary President: William H. Robertson (R)
- Party control: Republican (20-12)

Assembly
- Members: 128
- Speaker: Thomas G. Alvord (R)
- Party control: Republican (98-27-3)

Sessions
- 1st: January 7 – May 22, 1879

The 102nd New York State Legislature, consisting of the New York State Senate and the New York State Assembly, met from January 7 to May 22, 1879, during the third year of Lucius Robinson's governorship, in Albany.

== Background ==
Under the provisions of the New York Constitution of 1846, 32 Senators and 128 assemblymen were elected in single-seat districts; senators for a two-year term, assemblymen for a one-year term. The senatorial districts were made up of entire counties, except New York County (five districts) and Kings County (two districts). The Assembly districts were made up of entire towns, or city wards, forming a contiguous area, all within the same county.

At this time there were two major political parties: the Republican Party and the Democratic Party. The Prohibition Party and the Greenback Party also nominated tickets.

== Elections ==
The 1878 New York state election was held on November 5. The only statewide elective office up for election was carried by a Republican. The approximate party strength at this election, as expressed by the vote for Judge of the Court of Appeals, was: Republican 391,000; Democratic 356,000; Greenback 75,000; and Prohibition 4,000.

== Sessions ==
The Legislature met for the regular session at the State Capitol in Albany on January 7, 1879; and adjourned on May 22.

On January 7, senators and assemblymen met at the Old Capitol and then marched together to the New Capitol, taking officially possession of the new accommodations. The New Capitol was then still under construction, being finished only in 1899; and the Senate met for the time being in the Court of Appeals chamber. Due to heavy snowfall, many members had not arrived yet from the Western parts of the State, and the Legislature adjourned.

On January 9, Thomas G. Alvord (R) was again elected Speaker, with 94 votes against 24 for Erastus Brooks (D).

On January 21, the Legislature re-elected U.S. Senator Roscoe Conkling (R) to a third six-year term, beginning on March 4, 1879.

On April 23, the Legislature re-apportioned the Senate districts; and the Assembly seats per county. Columbia, Delaware, Madison, Oneida, Ontario and Oswego counties lost one seat each; Kings and New York counties gained three seats each.

== State Senate ==
=== Districts ===
- 1st District: Queens, Richmond and Suffolk counties
- 2nd District: 1st, 2nd, 3rd, 4th, 5th, 7th, 11th, 13th, 15th, 19th and 20th wards of the City of Brooklyn
- 3rd District: 6th, 8th, 9th, 10th, 12th, 14th, 16th, 17th and 18th wards of the City of Brooklyn; and all towns in Kings County
- 4th District: 1st, 2nd, 3rd, 4th, 5th, 6th, 7th, 13th and 14th wards of New York City
- 5th District: 8th, 9th, 15th and 16th wards of New York City
- 6th District: 10th, 11th and 17th wards of New York City
- 7th District: 18th, 20th and 21st wards of New York City
- 8th District: 12th, 19th and 22nd wards of New York City
- 9th District: Putnam, Rockland and Westchester counties
- 10th District: Orange and Sullivan counties
- 11th District: Columbia and Dutchess counties
- 12th District: Rensselaer and Washington counties
- 13th District: Albany County
- 14th District: Greene and Ulster counties
- 15th District: Fulton, Hamilton, Montgomery, Saratoga and Schenectady counties
- 16th District: Clinton, Essex and Warren counties
- 17th District: Franklin and St. Lawrence counties
- 18th District: Jefferson and Lewis counties
- 19th District: Oneida County
- 20th District: Herkimer and Otsego counties
- 21st District: Madison and Oswego counties
- 22nd District: Onondaga and Cortland counties
- 23rd District: Chenango, Delaware and Schoharie counties
- 24th District: Broome, Tompkins and Tioga counties
- 25th District: Cayuga and Wayne counties
- 26th District: Ontario, Seneca and Yates counties
- 27th District: Chemung, Schuyler and Steuben counties
- 28th District: Monroe County
- 29th District: Genesee, Niagara and Orleans counties
- 30th District: Allegany, Livingston and Wyoming counties
- 31st District: Erie County
- 32nd District: Cattaraugus and Chautauqua counties

Note: There are now 62 counties in the State of New York. The counties which are not mentioned in this list had not yet been established, or sufficiently organized, the area being included in one or more of the abovementioned counties.

=== Members ===
The asterisk (*) denotes members of the previous Legislature who continued in office as members of this Legislature.

District	Senator	Party	Notes
1st	James M. Oakley*	Democrat	
2nd	James F. Pierce*	Democrat	
3rd	John C. Jacobs*	Democrat	
4th	Edward Hogan*	Democrat	
5th	Alfred Wagstaff Jr.*	Democrat	
6th	Louis S. Goebel*	Republican	
7th	Thomas Murphy	Republican	elected to fill vacancy, in place of John Morrissey
8th	Thomas C. E. Ecclesine*	Democrat	
9th	William H. Robertson*	Republican	President pro tempore
10th	Daniel B. St. John*	Democrat	
11th	Stephen H. Wendover*	Republican	
12th	Charles Hughes*	Democrat	
13th	Hamilton Harris*	Republican	
14th	Addison P. Jones*	Democrat	
15th	Webster Wagner*	Republican	
16th	William W. Rockwell*	Republican	
17th	Dolphus S. Lynde*	Republican	
18th	Henry E. Turner*	Republican	
19th	Alexander T. Goodwin*	Democrat	
20th	Samuel S. Edick*	Republican	
21st	John W. Lippitt*	Republican	
22nd	Dennis McCarthy*	Republican	
23rd	Nathaniel C. Marvin*	Republican	
24th	Peter W. Hopkins*	Republican	died on February 7, 1879
24th	Edwin G. Halbert	Republican	elected to fill vacancy, seated on April 2
25th	Theodore M. Pomeroy*	Republican	
26th	Edwin Hicks*	Republican	
27th	Ira Davenport*	Republican	
28th	George Raines*	Democrat	
29th	Lewis S. Payne*	Democrat	
30th	James H. Loomis*	Republican	
31st	Ray V. Pierce*	Republican	on November 5, 1878, elected to the 46th U.S. Congress
32nd	Loren B. Sessions*	Republican	also Supervisor of the Town of Harmony

=== Employees ===
- Clerk: John W. Vrooman
- Sergeant-at-Arms: Weidman Dominick
- Doorkeeper: James G. Caw
- Stenographer: Hudson C. Tanner

== State Assembly ==
=== Assemblymen ===
The asterisk (*) denotes members of the previous Legislature who continued as members of this Legislature.

District		Assemblymen	Party	Notes
Albany	1st	Hiram Griggs*	Republican	
Albany	2nd	Charles R. Knowles	Republican	
Albany	3rd	Thomas H. Greer	Republican	
Albany	4th	Waters W. Braman	Republican	
Allegany		Hiram H. Wakely*	Republican	
Broome		Henry Marean	Republican	
Cattaraugus	1st	William F. Wheeler	Republican	
Cattaraugus	2nd	Simeon V. Pool*	Republican	
Cayuga	1st	William A. Halsey	Republican	
Cayuga	2nd	William Leslie Noyes*	Republican	
Chautauqua	1st	Charles P. Ingersoll	Republican	
Chautauqua	2nd	James Prendergast	Republican	
Chemung		John Bandfield	Greenback	
Chenango		Oscar H. Curtis	Republican	
Clinton		William P. Mooers*	Republican	
Columbia	1st	Jacob W. Hoysradt	Republican	
Columbia	2nd	Perkins F. Cady	Republican	
Cortland		George H. Arnold	Greenback	
Delaware	1st	Albert E. Sullard	Republican	
Delaware	2nd	John S. McNaught	Republican	
Dutchess	1st	Obed Wheeler*	Republican	
Dutchess	2nd	Cornelius Pitcher	Republican	
Erie	1st	Bernard F. Gentsch	Republican	
Erie	2nd	Simon P. Swift	Republican	
Erie	3rd	James A. Roberts	Republican	
Erie	4th	Harvey J. Hurd*	Republican	
Erie	5th	William Alfred Johnson	Republican	
Essex		Warren French Weston	Republican	
Franklin		William D. Brennan	Republican	
Fulton and Hamilton		John W. Peek*	Republican	
Genesee		John Sanders	Republican	
Greene		George S. Stevens	Democrat	
Herkimer		Titus Sheard*	Republican	
Jefferson	1st	Charles R. Skinner*	Republican	
Jefferson	2nd	George D. McAllaster	Republican	
Kings	1st	John M. Clancy*	Democrat	
Kings	2nd	Jonathan Ogden	Republican	
Kings	3rd	Thomas J. Sheridan	Democrat	
Kings	4th	Charles T. Trowbridge	Republican	unsuccessfully contested by James G. Tighe (D)
Kings	5th	William W. Stephenson	Republican	
Kings	6th	Lewis R. Stegman	Republican	
Kings	7th	Maurice B. Flynn*	Democrat	
Kings	8th	John H. Douglass*	Democrat	
Kings	9th	Daniel W. Tallmadge	Republican	
Lewis		Charles A. Chickering	Republican	
Livingston		James W. Wadsworth*	Republican	on November 4, 1879, elected New York State Comptroller
Madison	1st	Augustus L. Saunders	Republican	
Madison	2nd	George Berry	Democrat	
Monroe	1st	Samuel Beckwith	Republican	
Monroe	2nd	Charles S. Baker	Republican	
Monroe	3rd	Henry W. Davis	Democrat	
Montgomery		John Warner	Republican	
New York	1st	James H. Madigan	Democrat	
New York	2nd	Thomas F. Grady*	Democrat	
New York	3rd	William H. McIntyre	Democrat	
New York	4th	John Galvin*	Democrat	
New York	5th	Thomas Bogan	Democrat	
New York	6th	Jacob Seebacher*	Democrat	
New York	7th	Isaac Israel Hayes*	Republican	
New York	8th	Daniel Patterson*	Democrat	unsuccessfully contested by John E. Brodsky (R)
New York	9th	George B. Deane, Sr.	Republican	
New York	10th	Ferdinand Eidman	Republican	
New York	11th	James M. Varnum	Republican	
New York	12th	Maurice F. Holahan*	Democrat	
New York	13th	Robert H. Strahan	Republican	
New York	14th	P. Henry Dugro	Democrat	
New York	15th	Michael J. Dougherty	Democrat	
New York	16th	Edward P. Hagan	Democrat	
New York	17th	Stephen N. Simonson	Republican	
New York	18th	Joseph P. McDonough*	Democrat	
New York	19th	Anthony Feehan	Democrat	
New York	20th	Walter H. Ackerman	Republican	
New York	21st	J. C. Julius Langbein	Republican	
Niagara	1st	Thomas N. Van Valkenburgh	Republican	
Niagara	2nd	James Low	Republican	
Oneida	1st	Benjamin Allen	Republican	
Oneida	2nd	Frank Sang	Republican	
Oneida	3rd	Thomas D. Penfield	Democrat	
Oneida	4th	H. Dwight Grant	Republican	
Onondaga	1st	Thomas G. Alvord*	Republican	elected Speaker
Onondaga	2nd	Samuel Willis*	Republican	
Onondaga	3rd	Henry L. Duguid	Republican	
Ontario	1st	John Robson	Republican	
Ontario	2nd	Charles R. Case	Republican	
Orange	1st	Morgan Shuit	Republican	
Orange	2nd	Franklin R. Brodhead	Democrat	
Orleans		Henry A. Glidden	Republican	
Oswego	1st	George B. Sloan	Republican	
Oswego	2nd	George E. Williams	Greenback	
Oswego	3rd	William H. Steele	Republican	
Otsego	1st	Azro Chase*	Republican	
Otsego	2nd	Nathan Bridges	Republican	
Putnam		Hamilton Fish II*	Republican	
Queens	1st	William J. Youngs	Republican	
Queens	2nd	William E. Pearse	Democrat	
Rensselaer	1st	Francis N. Mann Jr.	Republican	
Rensselaer	2nd	Eli Perry	Republican	
Rensselaer	3rd	Thomas B. Simmons	Republican	
Richmond		Erastus Brooks*	Democrat	
Rockland		James W. Husted*	Republican	previously a member from Westchester County
St. Lawrence	1st	Daniel Peck	Republican	
St. Lawrence	2nd	A. Barton Hepburn*	Republican	
St. Lawrence	3rd	Rufus S. Palmer*	Republican	
Saratoga	1st	Edward Stewart	Republican	
Saratoga	2nd	Daniel H. Deyoe*	Republican	
Schenectady		Daniel P. McQueen	Republican	
Schoharie		Duryea Beekman	Democrat	
Schuyler		Abram V. Mekeel*	Republican	
Seneca		David H. Evans	Republican	
Steuben	1st	Azariah C. Brundage*	Republican	
Steuben	2nd	George R. Sutherland*	Republican	
Suffolk		Charles T. Duryea	Democrat	contested; seat vacated
Suffolk		George F. Carman	Republican	seated on February 6
Sullivan		Roderick Morison	Democrat	
Tioga		John Theodore Sawyer*	Republican	
Tompkins		Charles M. Titus	Republican	
Ulster	1st	George H. Sharpe	Republican	
Ulster	2nd	Theodore Millspaugh	Republican	
Ulster	3rd	Leonard Davis	Democrat	
Warren		Barclay Thomas	Republican	
Washington	1st	Abram Reynolds*	Republican	
Washington	2nd	George L. Terry*	Republican	
Wayne	1st	John A. Munson	Republican	
Wayne	2nd	Jefferson Sherman	Republican	
Westchester	1st	James L. Wells	Republican	
Westchester	2nd	David Ogden Bradley	Republican	
Westchester	3rd	David W. Travis	Republican	
Wyoming		Orange L. Tozier	Republican	
Yates		Joel M. Clark*	Republican	

=== Employees ===
- Clerk: Edward M. Johnson
- Sergeant-at-Arms: Charles A. Orr
- Doorkeeper: Henry Wheeler
- First Assistant Doorkeeper: Harrison Clark
- Second Assistant Doorkeeper: Michael Maher
- Assistant Doorkeeper: John Christie
- Stenographer: Worden E. Payne

== Sources ==
- Civil List and Constitutional History of the Colony and State of New York compiled by Edgar Albert Werner (1884; see pg. 276 for Senate districts; pg. 291 for senators; pg. 298–304 for Assembly districts; and pg. 378 for assemblymen)
- The State Government for 1879 by Charles G. Shanks (Weed, Parsons & Co, Albany, 1879)
- THE CANVASS FOR SPEAKER in NYT on January 6, 1879
- THE STRUGGLE AT ALBANY in NYT on January 7, 1879
- THE CONTEST FOR SPEAKER in NYT on January 8, 1879
- ALVORD CHOSEN SPEAKER in NYT on January 9, 1879
- WORK BEGUN AT ALBANY in NYT on January 10, 1879
