= Senator Goebel =

Senator Goebel may refer to:

- Louis S. Goebel (1839–1915), New York State Senate
- William Goebel (1856–1900), Kentucky State Senate
