= George Deane =

George Deane may refer to:

- George Deane (cricketer) (1828–1929), English cricketer
- George B. Deane Sr. (1818–1903), American politician from New York
- George Campbell Deane, Chief Justice of the Gold Coast Colony, 1929–35
- George Deane (MP)

== See also ==
- George Dean (1867–1933), ferry boat master in Sydney, Australia, charged with attempting to poison his wife
