= Thomas F. Grady =

American politician (1853–1912)

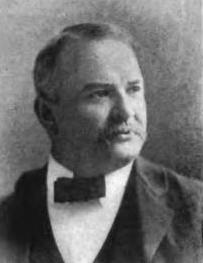
Thomas F. Grady (1903)

Thomas Francis Grady (November 29, 1853 – February 3, 1912) was an American lawyer and politician from New York.

== Life ==
Thomas F. Grady was born in New York City on November 29, 1853. He attended St. James Parochial School from 1857 to 1863, De La Salle Institute from 1863 to 1867, and graduated from Manhattan College. Then he worked for D. Appleton & Co., was Recording Clerk in the County Clerk's office in 1874, and began to study law. Then he worked in the Corporation Counsel's office, collecting evidence relative to the fraudulent claims of the Tweed era. He graduated from the New York University School of Law in 1877, was admitted to the bar, and practiced in New York City.

In politics he always was a Tammany Hall man. He was a member of the New York State Assembly (New York Co., 2nd D.) in 1877, 1878 and 1879; and a member of the New York State Senate (6th D.) in 1882 and 1883. In 1883, State Senator Grady and Governor Grover Cleveland became political enemies, and Cleveland asked Tammany boss John Kelly not to re-nominate Grady for the State Senate. Grady was a delegate to the 1884 Democratic National Convention and worked hard against Cleveland's nomination for U.S. President. During the following presidential campaign, Grady supported Benjamin F. Butler, the candidate of the Greenback and Anti-Monopoly parties.

In 1887, he secretly married actress Flo Irwin (Adeline Flora Campbell, 1859–1930, the sister of May Irwin), and they later divorced. Grady was again a member of the State Senate (6th D.) in 1889, and a Police Justice from 1891 to 1895.

He was again a member of the State Senate (14th D.) from 1896 until his death, sitting in the 119th, 120th, 121st, 122nd, 123rd, 124th, 125th, 126th, 127th, 128th, 129th, 130th, 131st, 132nd, 133rd and 134th New York State Legislatures. He was the Democratic minority leader from 1899 to 1910. The Democrats were in the majority in 1911, and Grady expected to be chosen President pro tempore, but was embittered when Tammany boss Charles Francis Murphy selected Robert F. Wagner instead. Due to his illness, Grady did not take his seat in the 135th New York State Legislature.

He died on February 3, 1912, at his home at 151 East 30th Street, in Manhattan, of diabetes, was buried at the Calvary Cemetery in Queens.

== Sources ==
- Civil List and Constitutional History of the Colony and State of New York compiled by Edgar Albert Werner (1884; pg. 291 and 377)
- The State Government for 1879 by Charles G. Shanks (Weed, Parsons & Co, Albany, 1879; pg. 104)
- SENATOR T. F. GRADY, FAMED ORATOR, DEAD in NYT on February 4, 1912

New York State Assembly
Preceded by Felix Murphy	New York State Assembly; New York County, 2nd District; 1877–1879	Succeeded by Thomas P. Walsh
New York State Senate
Preceded by Jacob Seebacher	New York State Senate; 6th District; 1882–1883	Succeeded by Timothy J. Campbell
Preceded by Edward F. Reilly	New York State Senate; 6th District; 1889	Succeeded by John F. Ahearn
Preceded by Jacob A. Cantor	New York State Senate; 14th District; 1896–1912	Succeeded by James A. Foley
