= Jacob Seebacher =

American politician

Jacob Seebacher (1833 in Germany – August 18, 1889 in New York City) was an American politician from New York.

== Life ==
He attended the common schools in New York City. Then he became a cigar maker, and later an auctioneer. He was a lieutenant in the 6th Regiment of the National Guard. He was at times an Inspector of Lamps and Gas; a clerk in the County Clerk's office; and Warrant Clerk in the Finance Department.

He was a member of the New York State Assembly (New York Co., 8th D.) in 1865 and 1866. Afterwards, he was a deputy sheriff.

He was again a member of the State Assembly (New York Co., 6th D.) in 1878 and 1879; and a member of the New York State Senate (6th D.) in 1880 and 1881.

He died at his home at 393 Pleasant Avenue in East Harlem.

== Sources ==
- Civil List and Constitutional History of the Colony and State of New York compiled by Edgar Albert Werner (1884; pg. 291, 367f and 377f)
- The State Government for 1879 by Charles G. Shanks (Weed, Parsons & Co, Albany NY, 1879; pg. 136f)
- Ten-Thousand-Dollar Offices — Appointments by the Sheriff Elect in NYT on December 25, 1870
- DEATH OF JACOB SEEBACHER in NYT on August 21, 1889

New York State Assembly
Preceded by William G. Olvany	New York State Assembly; New York County, 8th District; 1865–1866	Succeeded by James Reed
Preceded by Michael Healy	New York State Assembly; New York County, 6th District; 1878–1879	Succeeded by Patrick O'Connor
New York State Senate
Preceded by Louis S. Goebel	New York State Senate; 6th District; 1880–1881	Succeeded by Thomas F. Grady
