= Senator Browning (disambiguation) =

Orville Hickman Browning (1806–1881) was a U.S. Senator from Illinois from 1861 to 1863. Senator Browning may refer to:

- John W. Browning (1842–1904), New York State Senate
- Nickey Browning (born 1951), Mississippi State Senate
- Richard Browning (politician) (born 1952), West Virginia State Senate
