= Addison P. Jones =

American politician (1822–1910)

Addison Porter Jones
- Born: September 15, 1822; Greenville, New York, U.S.
- Died: May 5, 1910 (aged 87)
- Title: Member of the New York State Senate
- Spouses: Rachel J. Sole; Frances Elizabeth Babcock Jones (1836 - 1917) (m. 1866)
- Children: George Howard Jones (1853– 1936); Helen L. Jones (1867– 1957); Frances M. Jones (1879– 1960)

Addison Porter Jones (September 15, 1822 – May 5, 1910) was an American politician from New York.

== Early life and education ==
He was born on September 15, 1822, in Greenville, New York. He attended the common schools.

== Career ==
In 1843, he became a merchant in Catskill.

He entered politics as a Whig and in 1855 became a Democrat. He was Supervisor of the Town of Catskill in 1856, 1860 and 1861; and Sheriff of Greene County from 1862 to 1864.

He was a presidential elector in 1876, voting for Samuel J. Tilden and Thomas A. Hendricks.

Jones was a member of the New York State Senate (14th D.) in 1878, 1879, 1882 and 1883.

== Death ==
He died on May 5, 1910, and was interred in Catskill Village Cemetery in Catskill, New York.

== Legacy ==
His grandson, Addison Porter Jones II was named after him. He married Annette Whittaker and was the president of the Catskill Savings Bank.

== Sources ==
- Civil List and Constitutional History of the Colony and State of New York compiled by Edgar Albert Werner (1884; pg. 291 and 412)
- The State Government for 1879 by Charles G. Shanks (Weed, Parsons & Co, Albany NY, 1879; pg. 57f)
- The Samuel Gompers Papers by Stuart B. Kaufman (1986; pg. 263)

New York State Senate
Preceded by Augustus Schoonmaker, Jr.	New York State Senate; 14th District; 1878–1879	Succeeded by Charles A. Fowler
Preceded by Charles A. Fowler	New York State Senate; 14th District; 1882–1883	Succeeded by John Van Schaick
