= Senator Hopkins (disambiguation) =

Albert J. Hopkins (1846–1922) was a U.S. Senator from Illinois from 1903 to 1909. Senator Hopkins may also refer to:

- Benjamin F. Hopkins (1829–1870), Wisconsin State Senate
- James C. Hopkins (lawyer) (1819–1877), New York State Senate
- James G. Hopkins (1801–1860), New York State Senate
- Larry J. Hopkins (born 1933), Kentucky State Senate
- Peter Hopkins (politician) (1826–1879), New York State Senate
- Samuel M. Hopkins (1772–1837), New York State Senate
- Samuel Hopkins (congressman) (1753–1819), Kentucky State Senate
- William B. Hopkins (Virginia politician) (1922–2012), Virginia State Senate
