= Robert H. Strahan =

American politician (1843–1884)

Robert H. Strahan (September 22, 1843 Newburgh, Orange County, New York – October 1, 1884) was an American lawyer and politician from New York.

== Life ==
He was the son of James S. Strahan (1804–1877) and Emelia Clark Strahan (1807–1880). He learned the printing trade, and graduated from Westminster College in New Wilmington, Pennsylvania in 1863.

He enlisted as a private and was detailed for service as a clerk in the U.S. Department of War. In 1864, he joined his regiment and fought during the Overland Campaign, but soon came down with typhoid pneumonia and was sent back to Washington, D.C. to recover. He remained as a clerk in the War Department for the remainder of the war and afterwards.

He studied law at The Columbian College, D.C., graduated in 1868, was admitted to the bar in 1869, and practiced in Newburgh. He married Amelia S. McDowell (1844–1877), and their only child was George V. Strahan (1871–1923).

He was a member of the New York State Assembly (Orange Co., 1st D.) in 1871 and 1872. Afterwards he removed to New York City, and practiced law there.

He was again a member of the State Assembly (New York Co., 13th D.) in 1876, 1877 and 1879; and a member of the New York State Senate (8th D.) in 1880 and 1881.

On January 24, 1883, he married Caroline Cuyler Candee, and they had one child.

He died on October 1, 1884, at his home at 422 West Seventy-First Street, in New York City, of Bright's disease, and was buried at the Cedar Hill Cemetery in Newburgh.

== Sources ==
- Civil List and Constitutional History of the Colony and State of New York compiled by Edgar Albert Werner (1884; pg. 291, 372f and 376ff)
- The State Government for 1879 by Charles G. Shanks (Weed, Parsons & Co, Albany NY, 1879; pg. 149f)
- EX-SENATOR STRAHAN MARRIED in NYT on January 25, 1883
- EX-SENATOR STRAHAN ILL in NYT on August 5, 1884
- OBITUARY; ROBERT H. STRAHAN in the New York Tribune on October 2, 1884
- Cedar Hill Cemetery transcriptions

New York State Assembly
Preceded by Odell S. Hathaway	New York State Assembly; Orange County, 1st District; 1871–1872	Succeeded by Augustus Denniston
Preceded by A. Nelson Beach	New York State Assembly; New York County, 13th District; 1876–1877	Succeeded by John Clark
Preceded by Charles Holland Duell	New York State Assembly; New York County, 13th District; 1879	Succeeded by Charles Holland Duell
New York State Senate
Preceded by Thomas C. E. Ecclesine	New York State Senate; 8th District; 1880–1881	Succeeded by John W. Browning
