= Shelburne Railroad Station and Freight Shed =

Exhibit buildings at Shelburne Museum in Vermont, United States

Coordinates: 44°22′28.11″N 73°14′1.01″W

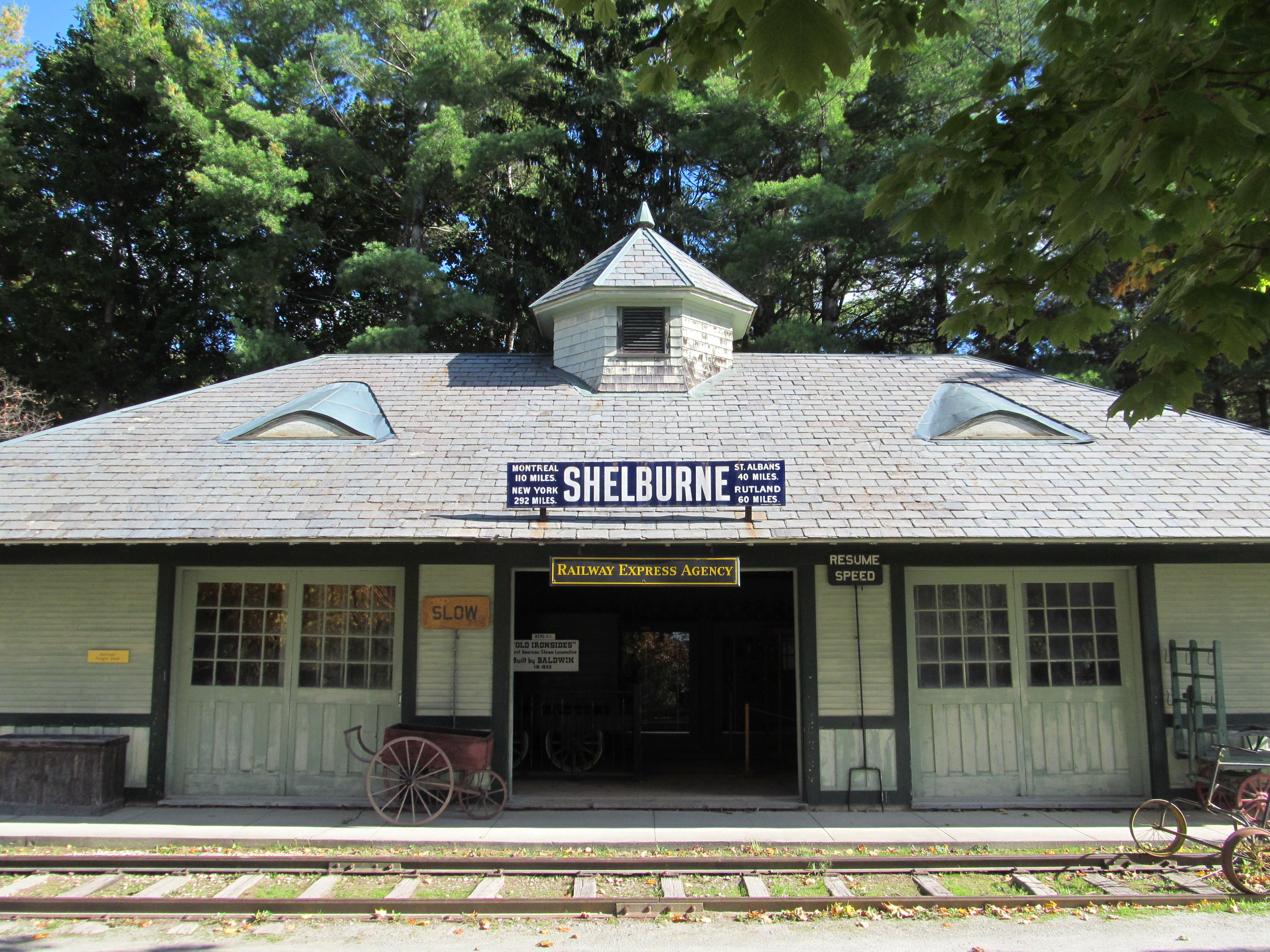
Shelburne Freight Shed

The Shelburne Railroad Station and Freight Shed are two exhibit buildings at Shelburne Museum in Shelburne, Vermont, United States.

In 1890 Rutland Railroad Station President Dr. William Seward Webb commissioned the building of the railroad station near the center of Shelburne village to conveniently serve passengers on the Central Vermont and Rutland Railroads.

== History ==
Designed by Robert Henderson Robertson, architect of the Vanderbilt-Webb estate on Shelburne Farms, the Railroad Station reflects the popular Shingle style, which developed out of the Queen Anne and Colonial Revival styles in the last quarter of the nineteenth century. The Shingle style accentuates the asymmetrical planning and prominent gables common to Colonial and Queen Anne revival structures, while the overhanging eaves, eyebrow windows, and the obligatory shingle siding blanket the structure's exterior to emphasize its fluid, continuous form. In the case of the Railroad Station, the shingled roof, which extends from the chimney peak to the edge of the overhanging porch, dominates the structure and unifies the building. Iterations of the Shingle style became common in the design of wealthy Northeasterners' summer "cottages", such as the house at Shelburne Farms. In applying the Shingle style to the Railroad Station, Robertson guaranteed stylistic consistency between the station and his nearby Vanderbilt-Webb estate.

Robertson originally divided the interior of the Railroad Station into individual waiting rooms for men and women, with the stationmaster's office in between. In 1953, when the Rutland Railroad discontinued passenger service to Shelburne, Dr. Webb's son, Vanderbilt Webb, and son-in-law, Cyril Jones, gave the station to Shelburne Museum. The museum moved the station to its present site in 1959 and renovated the building, restoring the interior to Robertson's original plan in the process. That year the museum constructed the adjacent Freight Shed, which mimics the Railroad Station stylistically and reflects the type of outbuildings that every railroad would have maintained.

== Collection ==
=== Railroad equipment and memorabilia ===
Railroads brought great changes in commerce and communications to New England in the second half of the nineteenth century. Before the advent of railroads, New Englanders depended on the region's lakes and rivers and the seacoast as their primary avenues of travel. Traveling inland proved difficult over roads that were muddy in spring, dusty and rutted in summer and fall, and littered with tree stumps year-round. Beginning in the late 1840s railroads brought new settlers to Vermont and helped the state's fledgling dairy industry flourish by providing access to markets for milk, butter, and cheese. Railroads connected once-remote New England communities to the rest of the country, improving mail delivery and bringing newspapers from Boston and New York City the next day instead of weeks later.

William Seward Webb served as president of the Wagner Palace Car Company and the Rutland Railroad at the turn of the twentieth century. The Shelburne Railroad Station, now at the museum, was constructed for Webb to serve the town and his estate at Shelburne Farms. Today it houses part of the museum's collection of railroad equipment and memorabilia. The communication devices displayed range from the simple message hoops and "high-speed delivery fork" to technological innovations like the telegraph and telephone. Other items in the collection include historic photographs and locomotive portraits, maps of the rail network in Vermont and the United States in the nineteenth century, broadsides, and timetables for Vermont railroads, and models of early locomotives.

The museum's collection also includes a large group of railroad lanterns and glass globes from railroads around the Northeast. Railroad lanterns served as a method of communication between conductors, brakemen, signalmen, and engineers. Also in the collection are track-setting equipment, semaphore flags, handcars, and other track maintenance equipment. The wooden replica of Old Ironsides, the first locomotive built by the Baldwin Locomotive Works, was first displayed at the Columbian Exposition in Chicago in 1893. Part of the collection is the Gertie Buck, a self-propelled inspection car built and used by the Dewey family on the Woodstock Railway in eastern Vermont in the last decades of the nineteenth century.

== See also ==
- Rail Car Grand Isle
- Rail Locomotive No. 220
