= George Arnold =

George Arnold may refer to:

- George Arnold (poet) (1834–1865), American author and poet
- George Arnold (bishop) (1914–1998), Canadian Anglican bishop
- George Arnold (entomologist) (1881–1962), British entomologist
- George Benjamin Arnold (1832–1902), English organist and musical composer
- George H. Arnold (1838–1883), New York politician
- George Matthews Arnold (1826–1908), English solicitor and politician, Mayor of Gravesend and Alderman of Kent County Council
- George William Arnold (fl. 2010s), engineer

== See also ==
- George Arnald (1763–1841), British painter
- Georg Arnold (1621–1676), Austrian composer and organist
