= Thomas G. Alvord =

American politician, lawyer and merchant (1810–1897)

Thomas Gold Alvord

Lieutenant Governor of New York
- In office January 1, 1865 – December 31, 1866
- Governor: Reuben Fenton
- Preceded by: David R. Floyd-Jones
- Succeeded by: Stewart L. Woodford

Speaker of the New York State Assembly
- In office January 1, 1879 – December 31, 1879
- Preceded by: James W. Husted
- Succeeded by: George H. Sharpe
- In office January 1, 1864 – December 31, 1864
- Preceded by: Theophilus C. Callicot
- Succeeded by: George Gilbert Hoskins
- In office January 25, 1858 – December 31, 1858
- Preceded by: DeWitt C. Littlejohn
- Succeeded by: DeWitt C. Littlejohn

Minority Leader of the New York State Assembly
- In office January 1, 1882 – December 31, 1882
- Preceded by: Erastus Brooks
- Succeeded by: Theodore Roosevelt

Member of the New York State Assembly
- In office January 1, 1877 – December 31, 1882
- Preceded by: Allen Munroe
- Succeeded by: James Geddes
- In office January 1, 1874 – December 31, 1875
- Preceded by: William H. H. Gere
- Succeeded by: Allen Munroe
- In office January 1, 1870 – December 31, 1872
- Preceded by: James V. Kendall
- Succeeded by: William H. H. Gere
- Constituency: Onondaga County, 1st District
- In office January 1, 1864 – December 31, 1864
- Preceded by: Elizur Clark
- Succeeded by: Daniel P. Wood
- In office January 1, 1862 – December 31, 1862
- Preceded by: Austin Myers
- Succeeded by: Elizur Clark
- In office January 1, 1858 – December 31, 1858
- Preceded by: Sidney Smith
- Succeeded by: Henry W. Slocum
- Constituency: Onondaga County, 2nd district

Personal details
- Born: December 20, 1810 Onondaga, New York, U.S.
- Died: October 26, 1897 (aged 86) Syracuse, New York, U.S.
- Resting place: Oakwood Cemetery
- Party: Republican
- Other political affiliations: Free Soil; Democratic
- Spouses: Amelia Ann Kellogg; Charlotte Curtis Merrill Alvord
- Children: 5
- Education: Yale College (1828)
- Occupation: Attorney

Thomas Gold Alvord (December 20, 1810 – October 26, 1897) was an American lawyer, merchant and politician. Throughout his political career he was known as Old Salt. He served as Lieutenant Governor of New York from 1865 to 1866 and was a longtime member of the New York State Assembly. He served as Speaker three times, including 1858, 1864, and 1879.

== Early life ==
He was born on December 20, 1810, in Onondaga, New York, to Elisha Alvord and Helen Lansing. His grandfather Thomas Gold Alvord was a soldier in the French and Indian War and served in the American Revolutionary War. His ancestor Alexander Alvord, immigrated from Somersetshire, England, and settled at East Winsor, Connecticut, in 1634. His maternal ancestor, Abram Jacob Lansing, left Holland in 1630, and located at Fort Orange. He became the patroon of a large grant of land which he called Lansingburgh.

In 1813, the family moved to Lansingburgh, New York. At the age of 15, he entered Yale College, graduating in 1828. Then he studied law with Thomas A. Tomlinson and George A. Simmons at Keeseville, New York, was admitted to the bar in 1832, and commenced practice at Salina, New York. In 1846, he became a lumber merchant.

== Political career ==
He began his political career as a Democrat, joined the Free Soil Party in 1848, and was elected to the Assembly term of 1858 as a Democrat. In 1861, he became a War Democrat, chaired the Union Convention at Syracuse, was nominated to run for the Assembly, and was endorsed by the Republicans and elected without opposition. For the terms from 1864 to 1872, he was elected as a Republican. For the term of 1874, he was elected as an Independent, defeating the Republican incumbent.

He was a member from Onondaga County of the New York State Assembly in 1844, 1858, 1862, 1864, 1870, 1871, 1872, 1874, 1875, 1877, 1878, 1879, 1880, 1881 and 1882. He was Speaker in 1858, 1864 and 1879.

He was the lieutenant governor of New York from 1865 to 1866.

He was a delegate to the New York State Constitutional Conventions in 1867 and 1894, and was chosen vice president on both occasions.

== Death ==
He died on October 26, 1897, in Syracuse, New York, and was buried at Oakwood Cemetery.

New York State Assembly
Preceded by Sidney Smith	New York State Assembly; Onondaga County, 2nd District; 1858	Succeeded by Henry W. Slocum
Preceded by Austin Myers	New York State Assembly; Onondaga County, 2nd District; 1862	Succeeded by Elizur Clark
Preceded by Elizur Clark	New York State Assembly; Onondaga County, 2nd District; 1864	Succeeded by Daniel P. Wood
Preceded by James V. Kendall	New York State Assembly; Onondaga County, 1st District; 1870–1872	Succeeded by William H. H. Gere
Preceded by William H. H. Gere	New York State Assembly; Onondaga County, 1st District; 1874–1875	Succeeded by Allen Munroe
Preceded by Allen Munroe	New York State Assembly; Onondaga County, 1st District; 1877–1882	Succeeded by James Geddes
Political offices
Preceded by DeWitt Clinton Littlejohn	Speaker of the New York State Assembly; 1858	Succeeded by DeWitt Clinton Littlejohn
Preceded by Theophilus C. Callicot	Speaker of the New York State Assembly; 1864	Succeeded by George Gilbert Hoskins
Preceded by David R. Floyd-Jones	Lieutenant Governor of New York; 1865–1866	Succeeded by Stewart L. Woodford
Preceded by James W. Husted	Speaker of the New York State Assembly; 1879	Succeeded by George H. Sharpe
Preceded by Erastus Brooks	Minority Leader of the New York State Assembly; 1882	Succeeded by Theodore Roosevelt
