= Edwin Hicks =

American politician

Edwin Hicks (February 14, 1830 Bristol, Ontario County, New York – November 30, 1902 Canadaigua, Ontario Co., NY) was an American lawyer and politician from New York.

== Life ==
He attended the common schools and Canandaigua Academy. He began to study law in 1850, was admitted to the bar in 1854, and practiced in Canandaigua.

He was District Attorney of Ontario County in 1857; and from 1864 to 1872.

He was a member of the New York State Senate (26th D.) in 1878 and 1879.

== Sources ==
- The New York Civil List compiled by Franklin Benjamin Hough, Stephen C. Hutchins and Edgar Albert Werner (1870; pg. 542)
- Civil List and Constitutional History of the Colony and State of New York compiled by Edgar Albert Werner (1884; pg. 291)
- The State Government for 1879 by Charles G. Shanks (Weed, Parsons & Co, Albany NY, 1879; pg. 64)
- DEATH LIST OF A DAY; Edwin Hicks in NYT on December 1, 1902

New York State Senate
| Preceded by Stephen H. Hammond | New York State Senate; 26th District; 1878–1879 | Succeeded by William B. Woodin |
