= John B. Meyenborg =

American politician

John B. Meyenborg (March 9, 1842 – December 5, 1902) was a German-American lawyer and politician from New York.

== Life ==
Meyenborg was born on March 9, 1842 in Wremen, Kingdom of Hanover. He immigrated to America in 1859 and settled in Brooklyn, New York.

Meyenborg initially worked in the mercantile business, but he later studied law under John H. Kemble and Judge Lynch. He was admitted to the bar in 1877. At one point, he worked in the office of the Board of Tax Commissioners in Manhattan.

In 1877, Meyenborg was elected to the New York State Assembly as a Democrat, representing the Kings County 2nd District. He served in the Assembly in 1878. He then served as Supervisor-at-Large of the county from 1880 to 1881. He was Counsel to the Kings County Board of Supervisors from 1882 to 1883 and from 1886 to 1893. He was a delegate to the 1894 New York State Constitutional Convention.

In 1866, Meyenborg joined the militia organization Ringgold Horse Guards. Five years later, he became Major of the 15th Battalion of the New York National Guard, a largely German battalion. He later became lieutenant colonel and resigned his commission in 1881. He was on the board of examiners of the Fifth Brigade for five years.

Meyenborg was a communicant of All Saints Protestant Episcopal Church. He was president of the local Saengerbund and a member of the Freemasons, the Odd Fellows, and the Knights of Honor. He was married to Annie Quail. They had four children, one of whom was a lawyer.

Meyenborg died at home on December 5, 1902. He was buried in Green-Wood Cemetery.

New York State Assembly
| Preceded by Richard Marvin | New York State Assembly; Kings County, 2nd District; 1878 | Succeeded by Jonathan Ogden |
