= James D. McClelland =

American politician

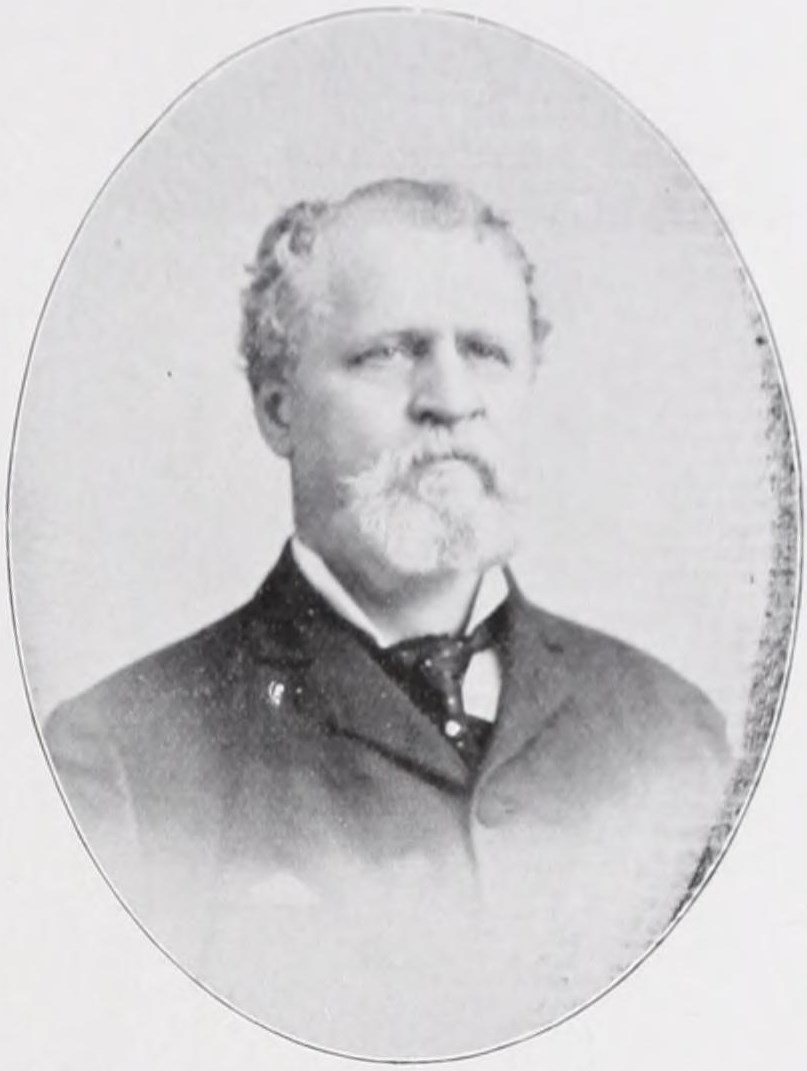

James Dodds McClelland (August 7, 1848 in New York City – January 13, 1919 in Mount Vernon, Westchester County, New York) was an American lawyer and politician from New York.

== Life ==
He was the son of John McClelland and Margaret McClelland. He attended private schools, and graduated from Mt. Washington Collegiate Institute in 1863. He graduated from New York University School of Law in 1867, was admitted to the bar, and practiced in New York City. In 1869, he married Annie Melso.

McClelland was a member of the New York State Assembly (New York Co., 9th D.) in 1882.

He was an Assistant D.A. of New York County from 1898 to 1901 (under Asa Bird Gardiner and Eugene A. Philbin).

He was a member of the New York State Senate (13th D.) from 1911 to 1914, sitting in the 134th, 135th, 136th and 137th New York State Legislatures.

In 1916, he was again appointed as an Assistant D.A. (under Edward Swann), prosecuting criminal cases.

McClelland died on January 13, 1919, at his home at 402 South Sixth Avenue in Mount Vernon, New York, of heart disease.

== Sources ==
- Official New York from Cleveland to Hughes by Charles Elliott Fitch (Hurd Publishing Co., New York and Buffalo, 1911, Vol. IV; pg. 367)
- The New York Red Book (1913; pg. 97)
- Who's Who in New York by Geddings Harry Crawford (1916)
- Ex-Senator James D. McClelland in NYT on January 14, 1919

New York State Assembly
Preceded by John W. Browning	New York State Assembly; New York County, 9th District; 1882	Succeeded by Frederick B. House
New York State Senate
Preceded by William J. A. Caffrey	New York State Senate; 13th District; 1911–1914	Succeeded by Jimmy Walker
