= Thomas C. E. Ecclesine =

American politician

Thomas Charles Edward Ecclesine (October 19, 1846 in Dublin, Ireland – December 12, 1895 in New York City, USA) was an American lawyer and politician from New York.

== Life ==
The family emigrated to the United States when Thomas was ten years old, and settled in New York City. He graduated from Columbia College in 1870, and from Columbia Law School in 1871. He was Wheeler H. Peckham's managing clerk during the Tweed Ring trials.

Ecclesine was a member of the New York State Assembly (New York Co., 19th D.) in 1877.

He was a member of the New York State Senate (8th D.) in 1878 and 1879.

He died at his home at 102 West 128th Street on December 12, 1895, of "diabetes and heart trouble," and was buried at St. Raymond's Cemetery, now in The Bronx.

== Sources ==
- Civil List and Constitutional History of the Colony and State of New York compiled by Edgar Albert Werner (1884; pg. 290 and 377)
- The State Government for 1879 by Charles G. Shanks (Weed, Parsons & Co, Albany NY, 1879; pg. 53)
- A SOUTH AMERICAN BRIDE in NYT on November 30, 1887
- OBITUARY RECORD; Thomas Charles Edward Ecclesine in NYT on December 13, 1895
- FUNERAL OF THOMAS C. E. ECCLESINE in NYT on December 15, 1895

New York State Assembly
Preceded by James T. King	New York State Assembly; New York County, 19th District; 1877	Succeeded by David L. Baker
New York State Senate
Preceded by Francis M. Bixby	New York State Senate; 8th District; 1878–1879	Succeeded by Robert H. Strahan
