= Waters W. Braman =

American politician

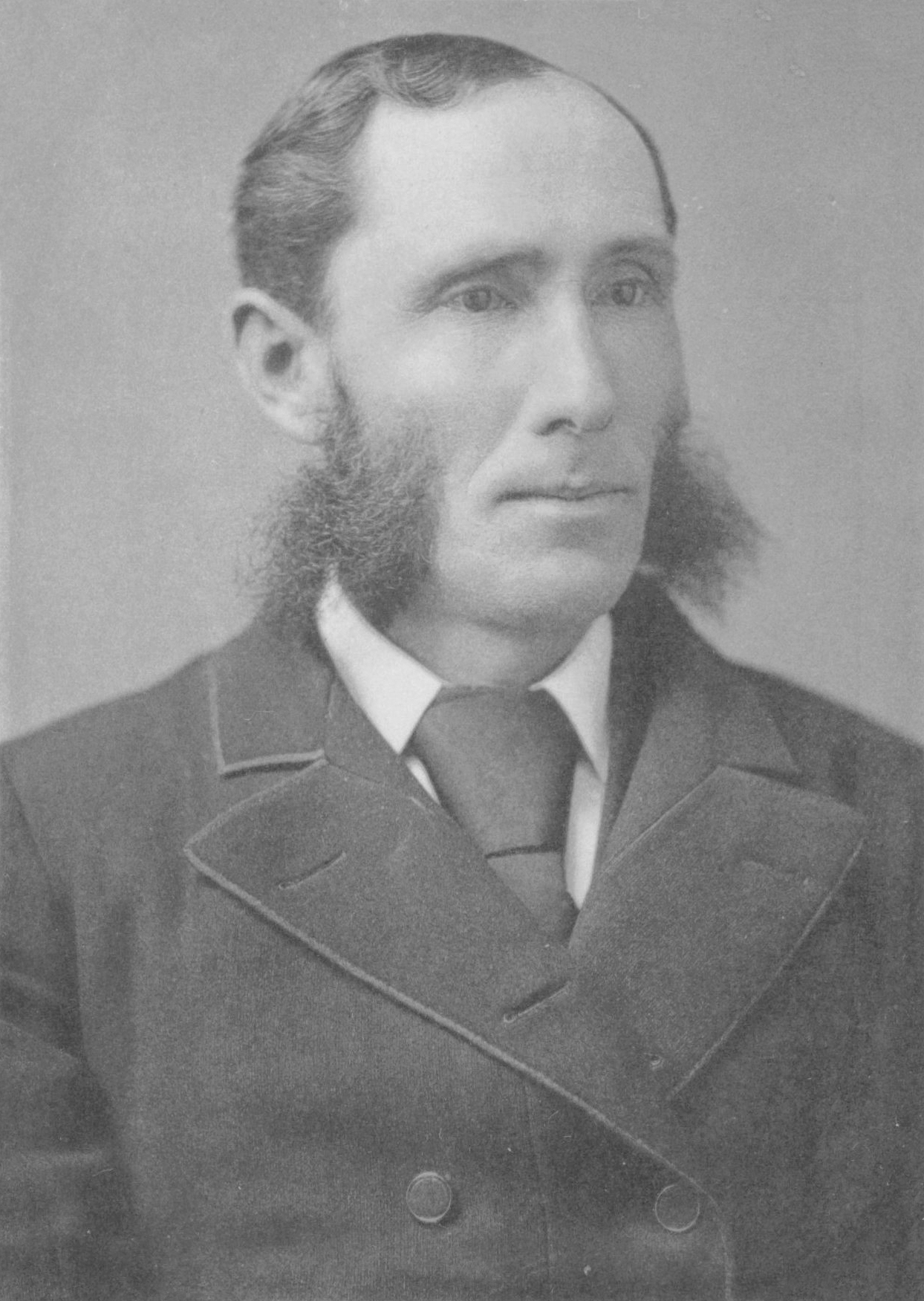
Braman c. 1880

Waters Whipple Braman (April 20, 1840 Troy, Rensselaer County, New York – December 8, 1893 Trois-Rivières, Quebec, Canada) was an American politician from New York.

== Life ==
He was the son of Horace Braman and Caroline (Whipple) Braman (1805–1845). Braman's mother died when he was young, and he went to live with his uncle, Waters W. Whipple, who also lived in Troy. He attended the common schools and Troy High School. Then he engaged in the lumber trade. In 1860, he became a partner in the firm Belknap & Braman.

When the American Civil War broke out, he closed out his business interests and joined the Army. He fought from 1861 to 1865 with the 93rd New York Volunteers in the Army of the Potomac, finishing the war as a brevet major. Braman returned to West Troy (Watervliet) and resumed his career in the lumber business, joining the firm founded by his uncle, W.W. Whipple & Company. On October 26, 1865, he married Margaret ("Maggie") Jane Getty (born 1845), and they had several children. He was a trustee of the Village of West Troy in 1873 and 1874.

He was a member of the New York State Assembly (Albany Co., 4th D.) in 1874 and 1875. In 1877, he contested the election of Democrat Edward Curran, and was seated in the 100th New York State Legislature on February 27. He was again a member of the State Assembly in 1879; and a member of the New York State Senate (17th D.) in 1880 and 1881.

In the spring of 1891, he removed with his family to Trois-Rivières in Quebec, and engaged in the lumber trade there. He died there two years later, on December 8, 1893.

== Sources ==
- Civil List and Constitutional History of the Colony and State of New York compiled by Edgar Albert Werner (1884; pg. 291, 374f and 378)
- Life Sketches of Government Officers and Members of the Legislature of the State of New York in 1875 by W. H. McElroy and Alex. McBride (pg. 144ff)
- Braman genealogy at Gen Web
- History of the City of Watervliet, N.Y., 1630 to 1910 (pg. 82)

== Notes ==
New York State Assembly
Preceded by George B. Mosher	New York State Assembly; Albany Co., 4th District; 1874–1875	Succeeded by Alfred LeRoy
Preceded by Edward Curran	New York State Assembly; Albany Co., 4th District; 1877	Succeeded by Edward Curran
Preceded by Edward Curran	New York State Assembly; Albany Co., 4th District; 1879	Succeeded by Joseph Hynes
New York State Senate
Preceded by Dolphus S. Lynde	New York State Senate; 17th District; 1880–1881	Succeeded by Abraham Lansing
