= Obed Wheeler =

American businessman and politician

Member of the New York State Assembly from the Dutchess County 1st District
- In office 1892
- Preceded by: Willard H. Mase
- Succeeded by: Edward H. Thompson
- In office 1878–1879
- Preceded by: Thomas Hammond
- Succeeded by: Isaac S. Carpenter

Personal details
- Born: November 15, 1841 Dover, New York
- Died: January 31, 1898 (aged 57) New York City, New York
- Party: Republican
- Education: Columbia University (LLB)

Military service
- Branch/service: United States Army
- Battles/wars: American Civil War; Battle of Gettysburg; Sherman's March to the Sea

Obed Wheeler (November 15, 1841 – January 31, 1898) was an American businessman and politician from New York who served as a member of the New York State Assembly.

== Early life ==
Wheeler was born on November 15, 1841. in Dover, New York. In 1858, he went to the Amenia Seminary in Amenia. In 1860, he began attending Yale University, but he left in order to fight in the American Civil War. His parents were Thomas Wheeler and Rhoda Ann Olney.

== Career ==
In September 1862, Wheeler enrolled in the 150th New York Volunteer Infantry Regiment, where he was mustered in as first lieutenant in Company E. In December 1863, he was promoted to captain of his company. He was also made brevet major. He was mustered out with his company in June 1865. His regiment's first battle was the Battle of Gettysburg, and he fought in a number of other battles, including Sherman's March to the Sea.

After the War, Wheeler studied at Columbia Law School and, upon his graduation, was admitted to the bar. However, he never practiced law, as he then became a member of the New York Stock Exchange. He later served as director of the Brooklyn Warehouse and Storage Company, the Schermerhorn Bank of Brooklyn, and the Plaza Bank of Manhattan.

In 1877, Wheeler was elected to the New York State Assembly as a Republican, representing the Dutchess County 1st District. He served in the Assembly in 1878, 1879, and 1892.

== Personal life ==
For many years, he lived in the Murray Hill Hotel in Manhattan. However, his permanent residence was the family mansion in South Dover, and he owned two large farms in Dover Plains. Wheeler never married. He was a member of the Union League Club, the New York Yacht Club, the Military Order of the Loyal Legion of the United States, and the Grand Army of the Republic. He was also a freemason and a member of the New York Athletic Club. He was a supporter of the Dover Baptist Church.

Wheeler died on January 31, 1898, in his New York City apartment from a pulmonary hemorrhage. He was buried in Woodlawn Cemetery.

New York State Assembly
Preceded by Thomas Hammond	New York State Assembly; Dutchess County, 1st District; 1878–1879	Succeeded by Isaac S. Carpenter
Preceded by Willard H. Mase	New York State Assembly; Dutchess County, 1st District; 1892	Succeeded by Edward H. Thompson
