= Nathaniel C. Marvin =

American politician

Nathaniel Curtis Marvin (March 23, 1826 Walton, Delaware County, New York – November 29, 1895) was an American lawyer and politician from New York.

== Life ==
He attended the district schools and Delaware Literary Institute. Then he studied law, was admitted to the bar, and practiced in Walton. In 1850, he married Julia Ann Fitch (1831–1912), and they had several children. In 1851, he was elected colonel of the 27th Regiment of the State Militia.

He was a member of the New York State Senate (23rd D.) in 1878 and 1879.

He was buried at the Town and Village Cemetery in Walton.

== Sources ==
- Civil List and Constitutional History of the Colony and State of New York compiled by Edgar Albert Werner (1884; pg. 291)
- The State Government for 1879 by Charles G. Shanks (Weed, Parsons & Co, Albany NY, 1879; pg. 63f)
- Cemetery transcriptions

New York State Senate
Preceded by William C. Lamont	New York State Senate; 23rd District; 1878–1879	Succeeded by Albert M. Mills
