= Lewis S. Payne =

American politician

Lewis S. Payne (January 21, 1819, in Bergen, Genesee County, New York – 1898) was an American merchant, Union Army officer and politician from New York.

== Life ==
He attended the common schools. In 1835, he became a store clerk in Tonawanda. In 1840, he opened his own store, and married Mary Taber (1819–1907). In 1841, he removed to North Tonawanda, New York. Later he engaged in the lumber business, and built the first steam sawmill in Tonawanda. Then he also engaged in the forwarding, shipping and commission business, and later became a farmer.

He was Supervisor of the Town of Wheatfield for many terms, beginning in 1844. He was Collector of Canal Tolls at Tonawanda from 1849 to 1850; and Clerk of Niagara County from 1852 to 1854.

During the American Civil War he fought as a captain with the 100th New York Infantry, and took part in many battles of the Peninsula Campaign. In August 1863, he was wounded and taken prisoner, and held in Charleston, South Carolina, until being exchanged in March 1865.

He was again Clerk of Niagara County from 1866 to 1868; a member of the New York State Assembly (Niagara Co., 1st D.) in 1870; and a member of the New York State Senate (29th D.) in 1878 and 1879.

He was buried at the Elmlawn Cemetery in Kenmore.

== Sources ==
- Civil List and Constitutional History of the Colony and State of New York compiled by Edgar Albert Werner (1884; pg. 291, 371 and 426)
- The State Government for 1879 by Charles G. Shanks (Weed, Parsons & Co, Albany NY, 1879; pg. 68f)
- History of Niagara County ("Brief Sketches of Wheatfield Citizens", pg. 380)

New York State Assembly
Preceded by Ransom M. Skeels	New York State Assembly; Niagara County, 1st District; 1870	Succeeded by John E. Pound
New York State Senate
Preceded by Dan H. Cole	New York State Senate; 29th District; 1878–1879	Succeeded by Edmund L. Pitts
