= Charles S. Baker =

American politician

Charles Simeon Baker
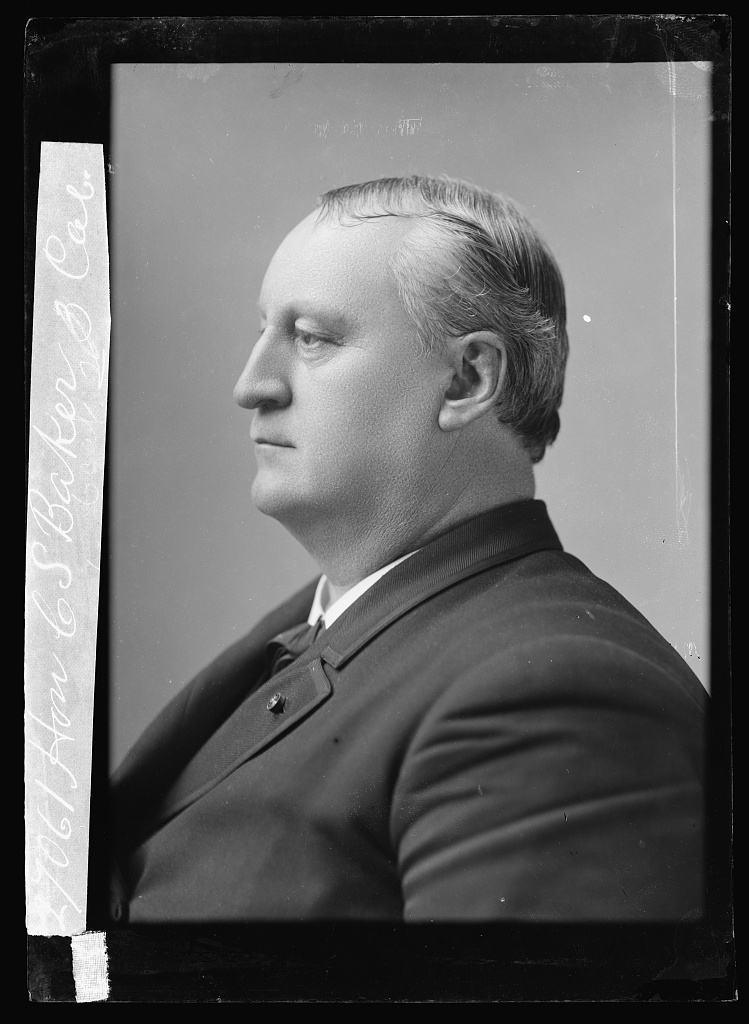

Member of the U.S. House of Representatives from New York's 30th district
- In office March 4, 1885 – March 3, 1891
- Preceded by: Halbert S. Greenleaf
- Succeeded by: Halbert S. Greenleaf

Member of the New York Senate from the 29th district
- In office January 1, 1884 – December 31, 1885
- Preceded by: Edmund L. Pitts
- Succeeded by: Edmund L. Pitts

Member of the New York State Assembly from the Monroe County, 2nd district
- In office January 1, 1882 – December 31, 1882
- Preceded by: John Cowles
- Succeeded by: David Healy
- In office January 1, 1879 – December 31, 1880
- Preceded by: Elias Mapes
- Succeeded by: John Cowles

Personal details
- Born: February 18, 1839 Churchville, New York, US
- Died: April 21, 1902 (aged 63) Washington, D.C., US
- Party: Republican
- Spouse: May L. Baker Jane E. Baker
- Education: New York Seminary at Lima
- Profession: Lawyer, politician

Military service
- Allegiance: United States
- Branch/service: United States Army
- Rank: First Lieutenant
- Unit: Company E, Twenty-seventh Regiment, New York Volunteer Infantry
- Battles/wars: American Civil War; First Battle of Bull Run

Charles Simeon Baker (February 18, 1839 – April 21, 1902) was an American politician and a U.S. Representative from New York.

== Biography ==
Born in Churchville, New York, Baker attended the common schools, Cary Collegiate Institute of Oakfield, New York, and the New York Seminary at Lima, New York. He married May L. Baker and Jane E. Baker.

== Career ==
Baker taught school while he studied law. He was admitted to the bar in December 1860 and commenced practice in Rochester, New York.

During the Civil War, Baker served in the Union Army as first lieutenant, Company E, Twenty-seventh Regiment, New York Volunteer Infantry. Disabled in the first Battle of Bull Run, he was honorably discharged. After the war, he was elected as a companion of District of Columbia Commandery of the Military Order of the Loyal Legion of the United States.

Baker was a member of the New York State Assembly (Monroe County, 2nd District) in 1879, 1880 and 1882. He was a member of the New York State Senate (29th District) in 1884 and 1885.

Elected as a Republican to the 49th, 50th, and 51st United States Congresses, Baker was U.S. Representative for the thirtieth district of New York from March 4, 1885, to March 3, 1891. He served as Chairman of the House Committee on Commerce during the 51st Congress. He resumed the practice of law in Rochester, New York.

== Death ==
Baker died from vocal cord paralysis in Washington, D.C., on April 21, 1902 (age 63 years, 62 days). He is interred at Mount Hope Cemetery in Rochester, New York.

New York State Assembly
Preceded by Elias Mapes	New York State Assembly; Monroe County, 2nd District; 1879–1880	Succeeded by John Cowles
Preceded by John Cowles	New York State Assembly; Monroe County, 2nd District; 1882	Succeeded by David Healy
New York State Senate
Preceded by Edmund L. Pitts	New York State Senate; 29th District; 1884–1885	Succeeded by Edmund L. Pitts
U.S. House of Representatives
Preceded by Halbert S. Greenleaf	Member of the U.S. House of Representatives from New York's 30th congressional district March 4, 1885, to March 3, 1891	Succeeded by Halbert S. Greenleaf
