= William Leslie Noyes =

American farmer and politician

William Leslie Noyes (April 24, 1836 – June 24, 1908) was an American farmer and politician from New York.

== Life ==
Noyes was born on April 24, 1836, in Niles, New York. His parents were Samuel Berry Noyes and Catherine B. Jackson. He was a direct descendant of Reverend William Noyes. The family moved to Owasco when Noyes was 10. He attended Fort Plain Academy and Fort Edward Collegiate Institute. After he finished school, he spent several years farming and teaching.

In 1859, Noyes married Eunice A. Brinkerhoff. They had two children, Helen M. Duryea and La Belle Claire.

In 1862, he was connected to the quartermaster's department in Fortress Monroe in Virginia. In 1866 and 1867, he was involved in trading and planting cotton in Port Hudson, Louisiana. From 1869 to 1870, he was superintendent for the Mississippi and Mexican Gulf Ship Canal Company, which was interested in creating a canal that connected the Mississippi River with Lake Boryne. From 1871 to 1872, he was superintendent for the New Orleans Draining Company.

Noyes returned to Owasco in 1874. He served as its town supervisor for eight years. In 1893, he moved to Auburn, where he was engaged in the seed trade.

In 1877, Noyes was elected to the New York State Assembly as a Republican, representing the Cayuga County 2nd District. He served in the Assembly in 1878, 1879, 1882, 1891, and 1892. While in the Assembly, he was a member of The Hepburn Committee.

Noyes died at home on June 24, 1908. He was buried in the family plot in the Owasco Rural Cemetery.

New York State Assembly
Preceded by John S. Brown (New York)	New York State Assembly; Cayuga County, 2nd District; 1878-1879	Succeeded by Hector H. Tuthill
Preceded by Hector H. Tuthill	New York State Assembly; Cayuga County, 2nd District; 1882	Succeeded by William Howland
Preceded by Leander Fitts	New York State Assembly; Cayuga County, 2nd District; 1891-1892	Succeeded by Eugene B. Rounds
