= Allen Munroe =

American politician

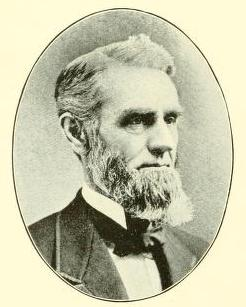
Allen Munroe

Allen Munroe (March 10, 1819 – October 6, 1884) was an American merchant, manufacturer, banker and politician from New York.

== Life ==
He was the son of Nathan Munro (1791–1839) and Cynthia (Champlin) Munro (1796–1877). He was born in that part of the Town of Camillus which was separated in 1829 as the Town of Elbridge, in Onondaga County, New York. In 1837, he became a clerk in a store in Auburn, and in 1840, he opened his own store in the Village of Elbridge.

In 1846, he married Julia Townsend (1824–1906), daughter of Mayor of Albany John Townsend (1783–1854), and granddaughter of Chief Justice Ambrose Spencer (1765–1848). The Munroes traveled for a year around Europe, upon their return settled in Syracuse, and had ten children. In Syracuse, Munroe engaged in milling, manufacturing and banking. He was President of the Onondaga County Savings Bank; and Vice President of the Oswego and Syracuse Railroad.

He was Mayor of Syracuse in 1854; Engineer-in-Chief of the State Militia from September 1857 until the end of 1858; a member of the New York State Senate (22nd D.) from 1860 to 1863, sitting in the 83rd, 84th, 85th and 86th New York State Legislatures; and a member of the New York State Assembly (Onondaga Co., 1st D.) in 1876.

He died at Syracuse, and was buried at the Oakwood Cemetery there.

State Senator James Munroe (1815–1869) was his brother; Assemblyman Squire Manro (1757–1835) was his grandfather.

== Sources ==
- The New York Civil List compiled by Franklin Benjamin Hough, Stephen C. Hutchins and Edgar Albert Werner (1867; pg. 401, 442f and 548)
- Biographical Sketches of the State Officers and Members of the Legislature of the State of New York by William D. Murphy (1861; pg. 89ff)

Political offices
Preceded by Dennis McCarthy	Mayor of Syracuse; 1854	Succeeded by Lyman Stevens
New York State Senate
Preceded by James Noxon	New York State Senate; 22nd District; 1860–1863	Succeeded by Andrew D. White
New York State Assembly
Preceded by Thomas G. Alvord	New York State Assembly; Onondaga County, 1st District; 1876	Succeeded by Thomas G. Alvord
