= Hamilton Harris =

American politician

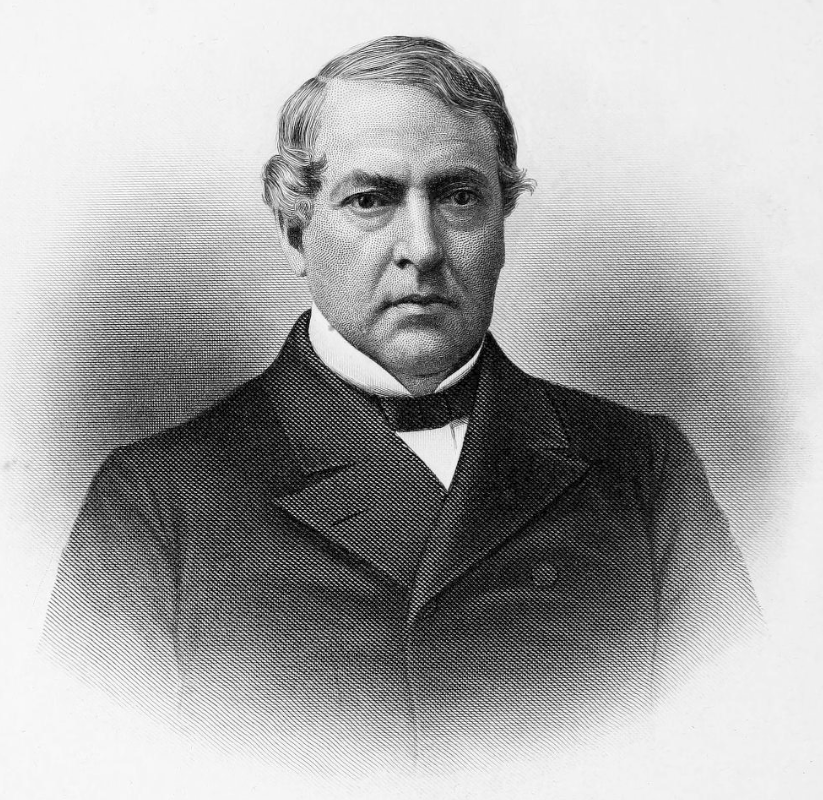

Member of the New York State Senate
- In office 1876–1879
- Constituency: 13th District

Member of the New York State Assembly
- In office 1851
- Constituency: 3rd District

Personal details
- Born: May 1, 1820 Preble, New York, U.S.
- Died: December 14, 1900 (aged 80) Albany, New York, U.S.
- Resting place: Albany Rural Cemetery
- Party: Republican
- Spouse: Lucy Moody Rogers
- Education: Union College
- Occupation: Lawyer, politician

Hamilton Harris (May 1, 1820 – December 14, 1900) was an American lawyer and politician from New York.

== Life ==
Hamilton Harris was born in Preble, New York on May 1, 1820. He studied at the Cortland Academy and the Albany Academy. Harris graduated from Union College in 1841. Then he studied law, was admitted to the bar in 1845, and practiced in Albany. He married Lucy Moody Rogers (1829–1898) in 1850.

He was a member of the New York State Assembly (Albany Co., 3rd D.) in 1851; and District Attorney of Albany County from 1854 to 1856.

He was a member of the New York State Republican Committee from 1864 to 1870; and a member of the Board of Capitol Commissioners from 1865 to 1875.

He was a member of the New York State Senate (13th D.) from 1876 to 1879, sitting in the 99th, 100th, 101st and 102nd New York State Legislatures.

In 1885, Harris was elected a Regent of the University of the State of New York. In 1891, he was conferred an honorary LL.D. degree by Union College.

He died in Albany on December 14, 1900, and was buried at the Albany Rural Cemetery in Menands, New York.

New York State Assembly
| Preceded by Robert H. Pruyn | New York State Assembly; Albany County, 3rd District; 1851 | Succeeded by Teunis Van Vechten Jr. |
New York State Senate
| Preceded by Jesse C. Dayton | New York State Senate; 13th District; 1876–1879 | Succeeded by Edward M. Madden |
