= Charles A. Fowler =

American lawyer and politician (1832–1896)

Charles A. Fowler (May 10, 1832 – February 7, 1896) was an American lawyer and politician from New York.

== Life ==
Fowler was born on May 10, 1832, in Cold Spring, New York.

Fowler attended the American Seminary in Dutchess County. When he was 16, he entered Yale College. He had to drop out in 1851, a year before he would have graduated, due to poor health. He then studied law under Azor Tabor in Albany and studied at Albany Law School. He was a member of the first class of the school, became the oldest living graduate by the time he died, and served as president of the Alumni Association in 1885. In 1853, a day before his 21st birthday, he was admitted to the bar. He then practiced law in Chicago, Illinois, for the next few years. In 1859, he opened a law office in New York City and formed a partnership with Alfred Conkling. In 1864, he moved to Ellenville and opened a successful law practice there.

Fowler served as Surrogate of Ulster County from 1868 to 1872. In 1879, he was elected to the New York State Senate as a Democrat, representing New York's 14th State Senate district (Ulster, Schoharie, and Greene Counties). He served in the Senate in 1880 and 1881. At some point prior to his election to the Senate, he moved to Kingston.

Fowler was a member, vestryman, and warden of St. John's Episcopal Church. In 1853, he married Hannah M. Warren, daughter of Cornelius Warren. They had two surviving sons, Cornelius W. and Everett. Everett worked as a law partner with his father for several years under the firm name C. A. & E. Fowler.

Fowler died in C. O. Sahler's sanitarium in Kingston, where he was for some time, on February 7, 1896. He was buried in Wiltwyck Rural Cemetery in Kingston.

New York State Senate
Preceded by Addison P. Jones	New York State Senate; 14th District; 1880–1881	Succeeded by Addison P. Jones
