= Rail Car Grand Isle =

Coordinates: 44°22′27.51″N 73°14′0.34″W

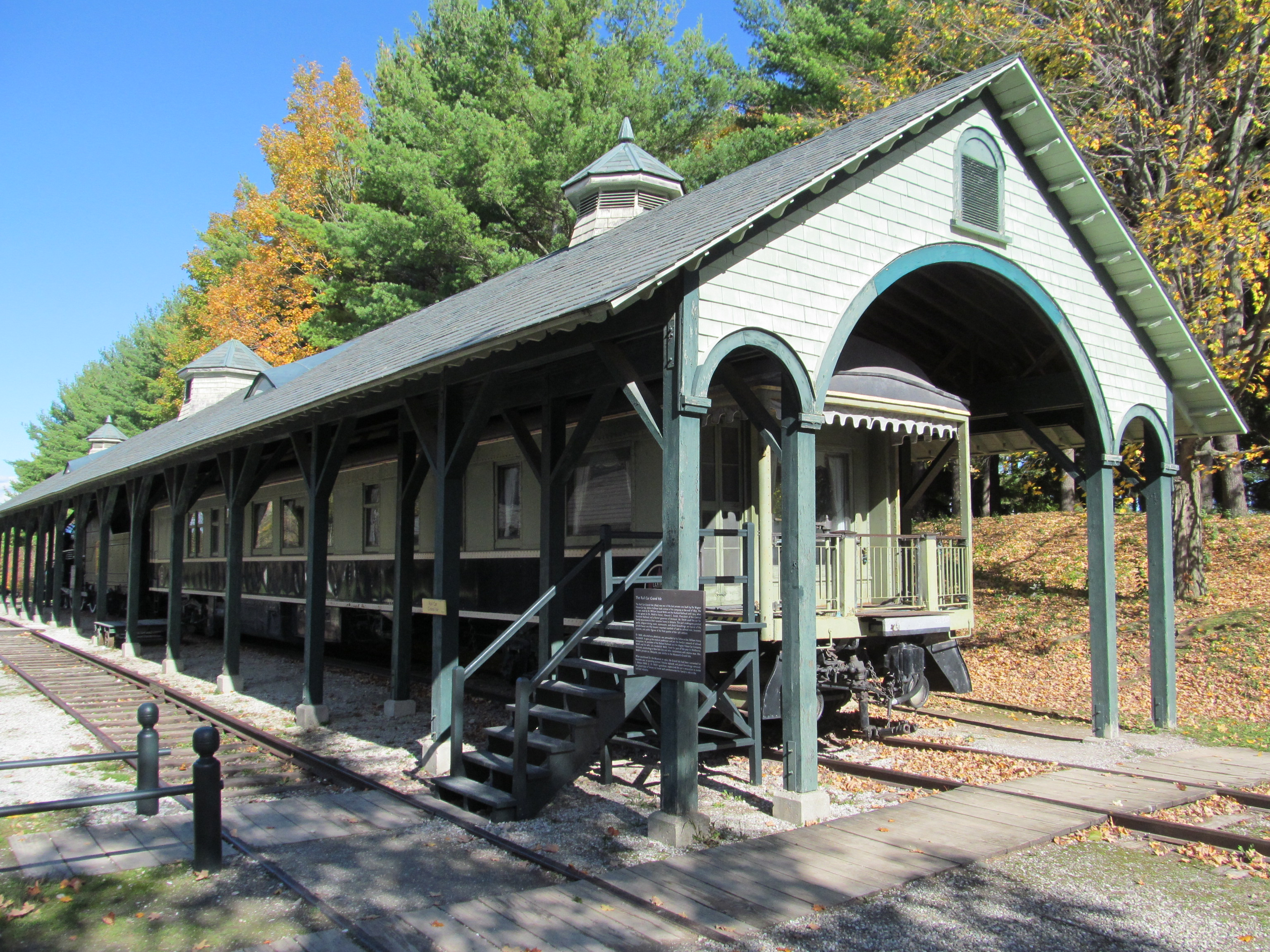
Rail Car Grand Isle

The Rail Car "Grand Isle" was a private railroad car operated as part of the Rutland Railroad and then the Central Vermont Railway from 1899 to 1959. It is now an exhibition building at Shelburne Museum in Shelburne, Vermont.

== History ==
The Wagner Palace Car Company fabricated the rail car Grand Isle in April 1899 for Dr. William Seward Webb, president of the company from 1885 to 1899. The wood-clad business car was initially listed as Rutland RR 500 Grand Isle. Although Webb was trained as a physician, his father-in-law, William Henry Vanderbilt, persuaded him to give up the medical profession and join the family's railroad enterprise instead. As president of the Wagner Palace Car Company and then the Rutland Railroad from 1902-1905, Webb lived for part of the year in Shelburne, Vermont, from whence he commuted with relative ease to New York City. Grand Isle was one of a group of rail cars owned by Webb. Among them, others made by Wagner included the Ellsmere, constructed in 1888, and the Mariquita, converted to a nursery car for a trip with family and friends between California and Alaska in 1888-89.

Webb later presented the Grand Isle to former Vermont governor and Central Vermont Railway president Edward C. Smith. The car's mahogany-paneled parlor, elegant dining room, staterooms, and plush furnishings typified the private luxury cars that became important symbols of rank to railroad men, business tycoons, and public figures in the final quarter of the 19th century.

When the museum purchased the Grand Isle in 1960, its paneling had been painted, its fixtures replaced, and its lush fittings removed to convert it to use as a business car. J. Watson Webb Jr., Dr. Webb's grandson, supervised the car's renovation, ensuring that it would once again embody the days of luxury rail travel and commemorate his family’s role in the railroad industry.

== See also ==
- Rail Locomotive No. 220
- Shelburne Railroad Station and Freight Shed
- Webster Wagner
