= Bragar =

Coordinates: 58.335°N 6.634°W

Bragar: Scottish Gaelic: Bhràdhagair
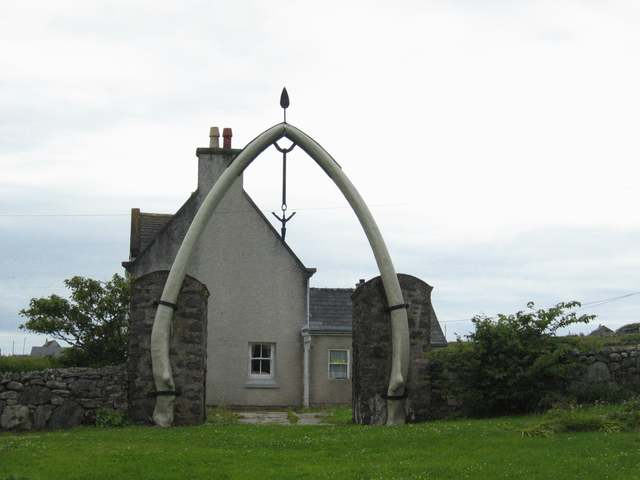
- The whalebone arch

- Location within the Outer Hebrides
- Language: Scottish Gaelic; English
- OS grid reference: NB288478
- Civil parish: Barvas
- Council area: Na h-Eileanan Siar
- Lieutenancy area: Western Isles
- Country: Scotland
- Sovereign state: United Kingdom
- Post town: ISLE OF LEWIS
- Postcode district: HS2
- Dialling code: 01851
- Police: Scotland
- Fire: Scottish
- Ambulance: Scottish
- UK Parliament: Na h-Eileanan an Iar
- Scottish Parliament: Na h-Eileanan an Iar

Bragar (Scottish Gaelic: Bhràdhagair, pronounced [braːgər]) is a village on the west side of the Isle of Lewis in the Outer Hebrides, Scotland, 14 miles (23 kilometres) from the island's only town, Stornoway. Bragar is within the parish of Barvas, and is situated on the A858 between Carloway and Barvas.

Residents are mainly Gaelic speaking, and many work as crofters.

The village's best-known landmark is a whalebone arch, made in 1921 from the jawbone of an 80-foot-long (24-metre) blue whale which was beached on the shore the year before. The arch is located at the Lakeview residence, the home of Murdo Morrison (1867–1950). Bragar also has a post office, a war memorial, and a school.

== History ==
A ruined Iron Age broch, Dun Bragar, stands in Loch an Dùin in South Bragar, 80 metres from the road and connected to the lochside by a causeway. In the mid-20th century local people took away many of its stones, and the structure is no longer safe.

The remains of a chapel, Teampall Eòin (the Temple of John the Baptist), built in the 15th century or earlier, lie inside a walled compound. This also contains a cemetery, now known as Cill Sgàire (Zechariah's cemetery) after Zechariah MacAulay who fell in a skirmish between the MacAulays of Uig and the Morrisons of Ness.

It is estimated that 2000 people are buried within the graveyard.

== Notable people ==
Roderick Morison, the retained harper to Clan MacLeod at Dunvegan Castle, was born in Bragar in 1656. He wrote Òran Mòr MhicLeòid.
