= George B. Bradley =

American lawyer and politician

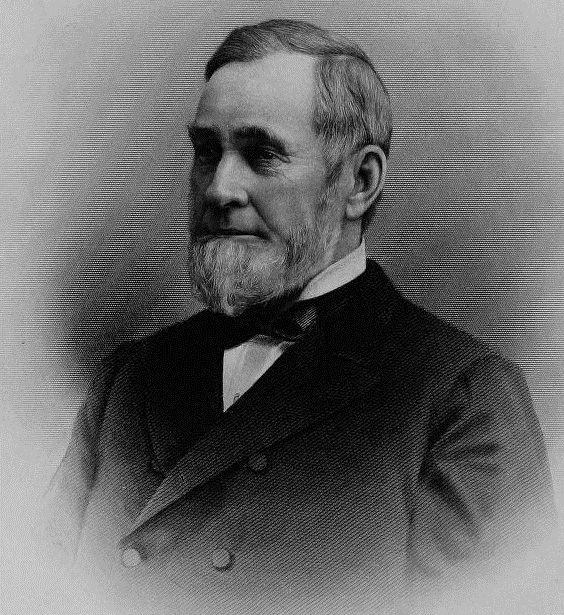
George B. Bradley (1911)

George Beckwith Bradley (February 5, 1825 – January 9, 1916) was an American lawyer and politician from New York.

== Life ==
He was born on February 5, 1825, in Greene, Chenango County, New York, the son of Orlo Fuller Bradley (1799–1845) and Julia (Carter) Bradley (1804–1891). He attended the common schools. Then he studied law, was admitted to the bar, and commenced practice in Woodhull, Steuben County, New York. On July 11, 1850, he married Hannah Eliza Lattimer (born 1826).

He was a member of the Constitutional Commission of 1872–1873.

He was a member of the New York State Senate (27th D.) from 1874 to 1877, sitting in the 97th, 98th, 99th and 100th New York State Legislatures.

At the New York state election, 1878, he ran on the Democratic ticket for Judge of the New York Court of Appeals but was defeated by Republican George F. Danforth.

He was a justice of the New York Supreme Court (7th D.) from 1884 to 1895, and sat on the General Term (now the Appellate Division) from October 16, 1893, until the end of 1895, when he retired upon reaching the constitutional age limit. On February 21, 1896, Bradley was designated by Gov. Levi P. Morton to hold extraordinary special terms of the Supreme Court in Corning for the remainder of the year, to dispose of backlogged business. On September 30, 1896, Bradley was appointed again to the Appellate Division, to fill the vacancy caused by the death of Calvin E. Pratt.

He died on January 9, 1916, in Corning, New York.

== Sources ==
- Life Sketches of Government Officers and Members of the Legislature of the State of New York in 1875 by W. H. McElroy and Alexander McBride (pg. 46f) [e-book]
- GENERAL NOTES in NYT on October 19, 1883
- Appointed by Gov. Flower in NYT on October 17, 1893
- TO HOLD SPECIAL TERMS OF COURT in NYT on February 22, 1896
- A Retired Judge to Resume in NYT on October 1, 1896
- Ex-Justice George B. Bradley in NYT on January 10, 1916
- Bradley genealogy at Bradley Foundation

New York State Senate
Preceded by Gabriel T. Harrower	New York State Senate; 27th District; 1874–1877	Succeeded by Ira Davenport
