= Peter Hopkins (politician) =

American politician

Peter W. Hopkins (February 1, 1826 – February 7, 1879) was an American lawyer and politician from New York.

== Life ==
He was born in Clifford, Susquehanna County, Pennsylvania, the son of Peter Hopkins (c.1785–1879) and Mary Ann Hopkins (1789–1876). The family removed to a farm in New York when Peter was still an infant. He attended the common schools, worked on his father's farm, and then taught school in Owego. In 1846, he began to study law, and was admitted to the bar in 1850. During the American Civil War he fought with the 109th New York Volunteers, and became adjutant and quartermaster of the regiment.

In 1864, he married Julia Keeler (c.1840–1866). After the war he resumed the practice of law in Binghamton.

He was District Attorney of Broome County from 1868 to 1874; and a member of the New York State Senate (24th D.) in 1878 and 1879.

He died on February 7, 1879, at the Eldridge House in Albany, New York, of "apoplexy," and was buried at the Spring Forest Cemetery in Binghamton.

== Sources ==
- Civil List and Constitutional History of the Colony and State of New York compiled by Edgar Albert Werner (1884; pg. 291 and 402)
- The State Government for 1879 by Charles G. Shanks (Weed, Parsons & Co, Albany NY, 1879; pg. 64)
- THE SENATE IN MOURNING in NYT on February 8, 1879

New York State Senate
| Preceded by John H. Selkreg | New York State Senate; 24th District; 1878–1879 | Succeeded by Edwin G. Halbert |
