= Henry E. Turner (New York politician) =

American politician

Henry E. Turner

Henry Ellis Turner (April 1, 1833 – February 6, 1911) was an American lawyer and politician from New York.

== Biography ==
Henry E. Turner was born in Winchester, New Hampshire on April 1, 1833. He attended the district schools and worked in a woolen factory. In 1854, he began to study law with Hiram Gardner in Lockport, New York, and attended Albany Law School for a few months. He was admitted to the bar in December 1855 and commenced practice in Lowville in 1856.

He was District Attorney of Lewis County, New York from 1857 to 1859; and Judge of the Lewis County Court from 1860 to 1863. In 1861, he helped to raise and organize, and became lieutenant colonel of, the 1st New York Light Artillery Regiment, and fought with the Army of the Potomac until 1862.

He was again District Attorney of Lewis County from 1871 to 1873.

He was a member of the New York State Senate (18th D.) in 1878 and 1879.

In 1881, he was elected a Regent of the University of the State of New York.

He died in Lowville on February 6, 1911.

== Sources ==
New York State Senate
Preceded by James F. Starbuck	New York State Senate; 18th District; 1878–1879	Succeeded by Webster Wagner
