= Elias Mapes =

American politician

Elias Mapes (May 12, 1833 – 1906) was an American union organizer and politician from New York.

== Life ==
He was born on May 12, 1833, in Parma, Monroe County, New York, the son of Caleb Mapes and Harriet (Avery) Mapes. He attended the common schools in Rochester. Then he became a machinist. He was active in the labor reform movement, and was Secretary of the Monroe County Working Men's General Assembly.

He also entered politics as a Whig, and joined the Republican Party upon its foundation. He left the party in 1870, and later ran in elections on independent and third-party tickets.

In November 1870, he ran in the 28th District for Congress, and received 50 votes in the election to fill the vacancy in the 41st Congress, and 658 votes in the election for the seat in the 42nd Congress.

In November 1877, he was elected to the New York State Assembly, nominated by the Greenback Party, the Working Men, and other independent labor reform organizations. The Republicans made no nomination at that election, and Mapes polled 7,400 votes, 3,807 more than his Democratic opponent. He was a member of the 101st New York State Legislature in 1878.

He died in 1906.

== Sources ==
New York State Assembly
Preceded by James S. Graham	New York State Assembly; Monroe County, 2nd District; 1878	Succeeded by Charles S. Baker
