= 101st New York State Legislature =

New York state legislative session

←	100th	102nd	→
- The Old State Capitol (1879)

Overview
- Legislative body: New York State Legislature
- Jurisdiction: New York, United States
- Term: January 1 – December 31, 1878

Senate
- Members: 32
- President: Lt. Gov. William Dorsheimer (D)
- Temporary President: William H. Robertson (R)
- Party control: Republican (19-13)

Assembly
- Members: 128
- Speaker: James W. Husted (R)
- Party control: Republican (65-57-6)

Sessions
- 1st: January 1 – May 15, 1878

The 101st New York State Legislature, consisting of the New York State Senate and the New York State Assembly, met from January 1 to May 15, 1878, during the second year of Lucius Robinson's governorship, in Albany.

== Background ==
Under the provisions of the New York Constitution of 1846, 32 Senators and 128 assemblymen were elected in single-seat districts; senators for a two-year term, assemblymen for a one-year term. The senatorial districts were made up of entire counties, except New York County (five districts) and Kings County (two districts). The Assembly districts were made up of entire towns, or city wards, forming a contiguous area, all within the same county.

At this time there were two major political parties: the Republican Party and the Democratic Party. The Prohibition Party and the Greenback Party also nominated tickets. The growing agitation in favor of bettering the conditions of the working class led to the first nomination of labor tickets, by the "Working Men Party", the "Social Democratic Party" and the "Bread-Winners League".

== Elections ==
The 1877 New York state election was held on November 6. All five statewide elective offices up for election were carried by the Democrats. The approximate party strength at this election, as expressed by the vote for Secretary of State, was: Democratic 383,000; Republican 372,000; Working Men 20,000; Prohibition 7,000; Social Democratic 1,800; and Greenback 800.

== Sessions ==
The Legislature met for the regular session at the Old State Capitol in Albany on January 1, 1878; and adjourned on May 15.

James W. Husted (R) was again elected Speaker with 64 votes against 55 for Erastus Brooks (D).

== State Senate ==
=== Districts ===
- 1st District: Queens, Richmond and Suffolk counties
- 2nd District: 1st, 2nd, 3rd, 4th, 5th, 7th, 11th, 13th, 15th, 19th and 20th wards of the City of Brooklyn
- 3rd District: 6th, 8th, 9th, 10th, 12th, 14th, 16th, 17th and 18th wards of the City of Brooklyn; and all towns in Kings County
- 4th District: 1st, 2nd, 3rd, 4th, 5th, 6th, 7th, 13th and 14th wards of New York City
- 5th District: 8th, 9th, 15th and 16th wards of New York City
- 6th District: 10th, 11th and 17th wards of New York City
- 7th District: 18th, 20th and 21st wards of New York City
- 8th District: 12th, 19th and 22nd wards of New York City
- 9th District: Putnam, Rockland and Westchester counties
- 10th District: Orange and Sullivan counties
- 11th District: Columbia and Dutchess counties
- 12th District: Rensselaer and Washington counties
- 13th District: Albany County
- 14th District: Greene and Ulster counties
- 15th District: Fulton, Hamilton, Montgomery, Saratoga and Schenectady counties
- 16th District: Clinton, Essex and Warren counties
- 17th District: Franklin and St. Lawrence counties
- 18th District: Jefferson and Lewis counties
- 19th District: Oneida County
- 20th District: Herkimer and Otsego counties
- 21st District: Madison and Oswego counties
- 22nd District: Onondaga and Cortland counties
- 23rd District: Chenango, Delaware and Schoharie counties
- 24th District: Broome, Tompkins and Tioga counties
- 25th District: Cayuga and Wayne counties
- 26th District: Ontario, Seneca and Yates counties
- 27th District: Chemung, Schuyler and Steuben counties
- 28th District: Monroe County
- 29th District: Genesee, Niagara and Orleans counties
- 30th District: Allegany, Livingston and Wyoming counties
- 31st District: Erie County
- 32nd District: Cattaraugus and Chautauqua counties

Note: There are now 62 counties in the State of New York. The counties which are not mentioned in this list had not yet been established, or sufficiently organized, the area being included in one or more of the abovementioned counties.

=== Senators ===
The asterisk (*) denotes members of the previous Legislature who continued in office as members of this Legislature. Thomas C. E. Ecclesine changed from the Assembly to the Senate.

Note: For brevity, the chairmanships omit the words "...the Committee on (the)..."

District	Senator	Party	Notes
1st	James M. Oakley	Democrat	
2nd	James F. Pierce	Democrat	
3rd	John C. Jacobs*	Democrat	
4th	Edward Hogan	Democrat	
5th	Alfred Wagstaff Jr.*	Democrat	re-elected
6th	Louis S. Goebel	Republican	Chairman of Claims, and of Public Expenditures
7th	John Morrissey*	Anti-Tam. Dem.	died on May 1, 1878
8th	Thomas C. E. Ecclesine*	Democrat	
9th	William H. Robertson*	Republican	re-elected President pro tempore; Chairman of Judiciary
10th	Daniel B. St. John*	Democrat	
11th	Stephen H. Wendover	Republican	Chairman of Banks
12th	Charles Hughes	Democrat	
13th	Hamilton Harris*	Republican	Chairman of Finance; of Public Buildings, and of Apportionment
14th	Addison P. Jones	Democrat	
15th	Webster Wagner*	Republican	Chairman of Railroads
16th	William W. Rockwell	Republican	Chairman of Insurance, and of Erection and Division of Towns and Counties
17th	Dolphus S. Lynde	Republican	Chairman of Manufactures, of Agriculture, and of Salt
18th	Henry E. Turner	Republican	Chairman of Privileges and Elections, and of Militia
19th	Alexander T. Goodwin	Democrat	
20th	Samuel S. Edick	Republican	Chairman of Villages, and of Joint Library
21st	John W. Lippitt	Republican	Chairman of Roads and Bridges
22nd	Dennis McCarthy*	Republican	Chairman of Canals
23rd	Nathaniel C. Marvin	Republican	Chairman of Miscellaneous Corporations, and of Poor Laws
24th	Peter W. Hopkins	Republican	Chairman of Internal Affairs of Towns and Counties, and of Retrenchment
25th	Theodore M. Pomeroy	Republican	Chairman of Cities, and of Rules
26th	Edwin Hicks	Republican	Chairman of Literature
27th	Ira Davenport	Republican	Chairman of Commerce and Navigation
28th	George Raines	Democrat	
29th	Lewis S. Payne	Democrat	
30th	James H. Loomis	Republican	Chairman of Printing, of Indian Affairs, and of Grievances
31st	Ray V. Pierce	Republican	Chairman of Public Health; on November 5, 1878, elected to the 46th U.S. Congress
32nd	Loren B. Sessions	Republican	also Supervisor of the Town of Harmony; Chairman of State Prisons, and of Engrossed Bills

=== Employees ===
- Clerk: John W. Vrooman
- Sergeant-at-Arms: Weidman Dominick
- Doorkeeper: James G. Caw
- Stenographer: Hudson C. Tanner

== State Assembly ==
=== Assemblymen ===
The asterisk (*) denotes members of the previous Legislature who continued as members of this Legislature.

District		Assemblymen	Party	Notes
Albany	1st	Hiram Griggs	Republican	
Albany	2nd	John N. Foster	Republican	
Albany	3rd	James T. Story	Republican	
Albany	4th	Edward Curran	Democrat	
Allegany		Hiram H. Wakely	Republican	
Broome		Alexander E. Andrews	Republican	
Cattaraugus	1st	Thomas J. King*	Republican	
Cattaraugus	2nd	Simeon V. Pool	Republican	
Cayuga	1st	Howell B. Converse	Democrat	
Cayuga	2nd	William Leslie Noyes	Republican	
Chautauqua	1st	Sherman Williams*	Republican	
Chautauqua	2nd	Temple A. Parker	Republican	
Chemung		George M. Baird	Greenback	voted for Elias Mapes as Speaker
Chenango		B. Gage Berry	Republican	
Clinton		William P. Mooers	Republican	
Columbia	1st	Jacob H. Proper*	Democrat	
Columbia	2nd	Samuel Wilbor	Republican	
Cortland		Orris U. Kellogg	Democrat	
Delaware	1st	Albert H. Sewell	Republican	
Delaware	2nd	Robert P. Cormack	Democrat	
Dutchess	1st	Obed Wheeler	Republican	
Dutchess	2nd	Peter Hulme	Republican	
Erie	1st	John L. Crowley*	Democrat	
Erie	2nd	John G. Langner*	Democrat	
Erie	3rd	David F. Day	Democrat	
Erie	4th	Harvey J. Hurd	Republican	
Erie	5th	Henry F. Allen	Democrat	
Essex		Benjamin D. Clapp*	Republican	
Franklin		John I. Gilbert*	Republican	
Fulton and Hamilton		John W. Peek	Republican	
Genesee		Eli Taylor*	Republican	
Greene		Cicero C. Peck	Democrat	
Herkimer		Titus Sheard	Republican	
Jefferson	1st	Charles R. Skinner*	Republican	
Jefferson	2nd	William M. Thomson	Democrat	
Kings	1st	John M. Clancy	Democrat	contested by Daniel Bradley (Ind. D)
Kings	2nd	John B. Meyenborg	Democrat	
Kings	3rd	John Shanley*	Democrat	
Kings	4th	Charles J. Henry	Democrat	
Kings	5th	William H. Waring	Republican	
Kings	6th	Jacob Worth	Republican	
Kings	7th	Maurice B. Flynn	Democrat	
Kings	8th	John H. Douglass	Democrat	
Kings	9th	John H. Bergen	Democrat	
Lewis		Cyrus L. Sheldon	Republican	
Livingston		James W. Wadsworth	Republican	
Madison	1st	Lambert B. Kern	Republican	
Madison	2nd	Willard A. Crandall	Republican	
Monroe	1st	Albert C. Hobbie	Republican	
Monroe	2nd	Elias Mapes	Working Men	voted for George M. Baird as Speaker
Monroe	3rd	James Chappell	Republican	
Montgomery		Edward Wemple*	Democrat	
New York	1st	John F. Berrigan*	Democrat	contested by John or Thomas Foley (Anti-Tam. D)
New York	2nd	Thomas F. Grady*	Democrat	
New York	3rd	James Hayes	Ind. Dem.	voted for James Daly as Speaker
New York	4th	John Galvin*	Democrat	
New York	5th	Peter A. Crawford	Democrat	
New York	6th	Jacob Seebacher	Democrat	
New York	7th	Isaac Israel Hayes*	Republican	
New York	8th	Daniel Patterson	Democrat	
New York	9th	John W. Browning	Democrat	
New York	10th	Joseph P. Strack	Ind. Dem.	voted for James Daly as Speaker
New York	11th	William W. Astor	Republican	
New York	12th	Maurice F. Holahan*	Democrat	
New York	13th	John Clark	Democrat	contested; seat vacated on April 2
New York	13th	Charles H. Duell	Republican	seated on April 2
New York	14th	James Daly	Ind. Dem.	voted for Samuel D. Halliday as Speaker
New York	15th	Christopher Bathe	Democrat	
New York	16th	James Fitzgerald	Democrat	
New York	17th	James T. Taylor	Democrat	voted for Sherburne B. Piper as Speaker
New York	18th	Joseph P. McDonough	Democrat	
New York	19th	David L. Baker	Democrat	
New York	20th	Marks L. Frank	Democrat	
New York	21st	Alexander Thain	Democrat	
Niagara	1st	Joseph D. Loveland	Democrat	
Niagara	2nd	Sherburne B. Piper*	Democrat	
Oneida	1st	William Jones	Republican	
Oneida	2nd	A. DeVerney Townsley	Democrat	
Oneida	3rd	Cyrus D. Prescott	Republican	on November 5, 1878, elected to the 46th U.S. Congress
Oneida	4th	Robert H. Roberts	Democrat	
Onondaga	1st	Thomas G. Alvord*	Republican	
Onondaga	2nd	Samuel Willis	Republican	
Onondaga	3rd	Josiah G. Holbrook	Republican	
Ontario	1st	David Cosad Jr.	Democrat	
Ontario	2nd	Amasa T. Winch*	Republican	
Orange	1st	James G. Graham*	Republican	
Orange	2nd	James W. Hoyt	Republican	
Orleans		Charles H. Mattison	Republican	
Oswego	1st	Charles North	Republican	
Oswego	2nd	George M. Case*	Republican	
Oswego	3rd	DeWitt C. Peck*	Republican	
Otsego	1st	Azro Chase	Republican	
Otsego	2nd	Daniel F. Pattengill	Democrat	
Putnam		Hamilton Fish II*	Republican	
Queens	1st	Elbert Floyd-Jones*	Democrat	
Queens	2nd	John Keegan	Democrat	previously a member from New York County
Rensselaer	1st	John H. Burns*	Dem./Work. Men	did not vote for Speaker
Rensselaer	2nd	Solomon V. R. Miller	Republican	
Rensselaer	3rd	William H. Sliter*	Democrat	
Richmond		Erastus Brooks	Democrat	voted for Sherburne B. Piper as Speaker
Rockland		James M. Nelson	Democrat	
St. Lawrence	1st	George F. Rowland	Republican	
St. Lawrence	2nd	A. Barton Hepburn*	Republican	
St. Lawrence	3rd	Rufus S. Palmer	Republican	
Saratoga	1st	George W. Neilson*	Democrat	
Saratoga	2nd	Daniel H. Deyoe	Republican	
Schenectady		Arthur D. Mead	Democrat	
Schoharie		Charles Bouck	Democrat	
Schuyler		Abram V. Mekeel	Republican	
Seneca		Diedrich Willers Jr.	Democrat	
Steuben	1st	Azariah C. Brundage	Republican	
Steuben	2nd	George R. Sutherland	Republican	
Suffolk		Charles S. Havens	Democrat	
Sullivan		Thornton A. Niven*	Democrat	
Tioga		John Theodore Sawyer	Republican	
Tompkins		Samuel D. Halliday	Democrat	
Ulster	1st	Seaman G. Searing	Democrat	
Ulster	2nd	Nathan Keator*	Republican	
Ulster	3rd	Isaac Hamilton	Democrat	
Warren		Alson B. Abbott	Republican	
Washington	1st	Abram Reynolds	Republican	
Washington	2nd	George L. Terry	Republican	
Wayne	1st	Jackson Valentine*	Republican	
Wayne	2nd	James H. Miller	Republican	
Westchester	1st	Ambrose H. Purdy*	Democrat	contested by Fordham Morris
Westchester	2nd	William F. Moller*	Democrat	
Westchester	3rd	James W. Husted*	Republican	elected Speaker
Wyoming		John E. Lowing	Republican	
Yates		Joel M. Clark	Republican	

=== Employees ===
- Clerk: Edward M. Johnson
- Sergeant-at-Arms: Charles A. Orr
- Doorkeeper: Henry Wheeler
- First Assistant Doorkeeper: Sandford Reynolds
- Second Assistant Doorkeeper: Michael Maher
- Stenographer: Worden E. Payne

== Sources ==
- Civil List and Constitutional History of the Colony and State of New York compiled by Edgar Albert Werner (1884; see pg. 276 for Senate districts; pg. 291 for senators; pg. 298–304 for Assembly districts; and pg. 377f for assemblymen)
- The Albany Evening Journal Almanac (1878; see pg. 64–68 for election results; pg. 111–116 for senators' bios; pg. 116–131 for assemblymen's bios; pg. 131f for Senate and Assembly committees)
- THE ASSEMBLY in NYT on October 29, 1877 (gives nominations by all parties)
- The Legislature; Senators Probably Elected in the Plattsburgh Sentinel on November 9, 1877
- THE STATE LEGISLATURE; MR. SPEAKER HUSTED in NYT on January 1, 1878
- THE STATE LEGISLATURE; ORGANIZATION OF BOTH HOUSES in NYT on January 2, 1878
