= Central Vermont 220 =

Coordinates: 44°22′28″N 73°14′00″W

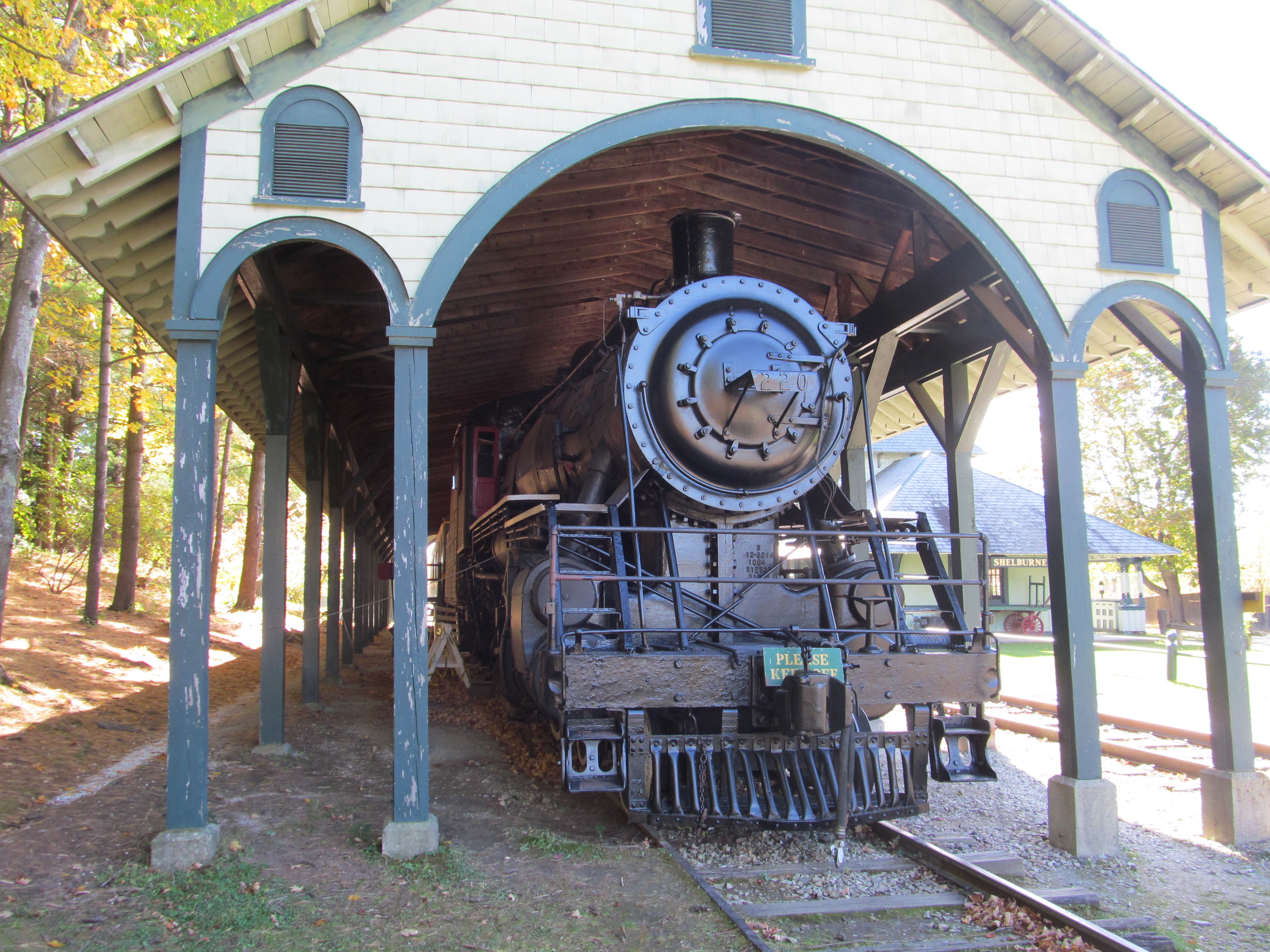
- No. 220 on static display in October 2012
Type and origin
- Power type: Steam
- Builder: American Locomotive Company (Schenectady Works)
- Serial number: 55018
- Build date: February 1915
Specifications
- Configuration
  - Whyte: 4-6-0
  - UIC: 2’C
- Gauge: 4 ft 8 1/2 in (1,435 mm)
- Driver dia.: 69 in (1,800 mm)
- Wheelbase: 58.79 ft (17.92 m)
  - Engine: 27.33 ft (8.33 m)
  - Drivers: 15.50 ft (4.72 m)
- Adhesive weight: 141,000 lb (64,000 kg)
- Loco weight: 189,000 lb (86,000 kg)
- Tender weight: 139,000 lb (63,000 kg)
- Total weight: 328,000 lb (149,000 kg)
- Fuel type: Coal
- Fuel capacity: 12 short tons (10.9 tonnes)
- Water cap.: 7,000 US gal (26,000 L; 5,800 imp gal)
- Firebox
  - Grate area: 53.40 sq ft (4.961 m^{2})
- Boiler pressure: 200 psi (1,400 kPa)
- Heating surface
  - Firebox: 184 sq ft (17.1 m^{2})
- Cylinders: Two, outside
- Cylinder size: 20 in × 28 in (510 mm × 710 mm)
Performance figures
- Tractive effort: 27,594 lb (12,516 kg)
- Factor of adh.: 5.11
Career
- Operators: Central Vermont Railway
- Power class: I-7-a
- Number in class: 3 of 4
- Numbers: CV 220
- Retired: 1956
- Preserved: 1960
- Current owner: Shelburne Museum
- Disposition: On static display

Central Vermont 220 is a preserved 4-6-0 "Ten-wheeler" type steam locomotive, built in February 1915 by the American Locomotive Company's (ALCO) Schenectady Works for the Central Vermont Railway (CV). It is preserved inside an exhibition building at Shelburne Museum in Shelburne, Vermont on static display.

== Background ==
In February 1915, the American Locomotive Company's (ALCO) Schenectady Works of Schenectady, New York, built No. 220, the last coal-burning, ten-wheeler steam engine used on the Central Vermont Railway (CV). Because it possessed a medium-sized 4-6-0 engine (4 leading wheels, 6 driving wheels, and 0 trailing small wheels), the No. 220 served double duty pulling both freight and passenger trains. No. 220 became known as the "Locomotive of the Presidents", because of its use on special trains carrying Calvin Coolidge, Herbert Hoover, Franklin D. Roosevelt, and Dwight D. Eisenhower.

The steam engine persisted as the only type of locomotive operating in the United States until the introduction of the electric train in 1895 and, even then, steam engines continued to dominate the rails until the 1950s when diesel came into wide use. The inscription "28%" on the coal tender indicates that the engine had the potential to lift or drag up to twenty-eight thousand pounds of dead weight. The Central Vermont Railway retired No. 220 from service in 1956 and presented it to the Shelburne Museum for preservation. The museum built the surrounding shed soon afterward to protect the locomotive and the private car (Grand Isle) from the elements.

== See also ==
- Shelburne Railroad Station and Freight Shed

== Bibliography ==
- Shelburne Museum. 1993. Shelburne Museum: A Guide to the Collections. Shelburne: Shelburne Museum, Inc.
