= Dolphus S. Lynde =

American politician

Dolphus Skinner Lynde (July 1, 1833 Antwerp, Jefferson County, New York – June 30, 1902 Canton, St. Lawrence County, New York) was an American politician from New York.

== Life ==
He attended Gouverneur Wesleyan Seminary. Then he became a merchant in Hermon.

He was a member of the New York State Assembly (St. Lawrence Co., 2nd D.) in 1871, 1872, 1873 and 1874.

He was a member of the New York State Senate from 1878 to 1883, sitting in the 101st, 102nd (both 17th D.), 103rd, 104th, 105th and 106th New York State Legislatures (all four 20th D.).

He was buried at the Evergreen Cemetery in Canton.

== Sources ==
- Civil List and Constitutional History of the Colony and State of New York compiled by Edgar Albert Werner (1884; pg. 291 and 372ff)
- The State Government for 1879 by Charles G. Shanks (Weed, Parsons & Co, Albany NY, 1879; pg. 59f)
- Death List of the Week; LYNDE in NYT on July 6, 1902

New York State Assembly
Preceded by Julius M. Palmer	New York State Assembly; St. Lawrence County, 2nd District; 1871–1874	Succeeded by A. Barton Hepburn
New York State Senate
Preceded by Darius A. Moore	New York State Senate; 17th District; 1878–1879	Succeeded by Waters W. Braman
Preceded by Samuel S. Edick	New York State Senate; 20th District; 1880–1883	Succeeded by John I. Gilbert
