= Samuel S. Edick =

American politician

Samuel Stearns Edick (June 17, 1834 in Columbia, Herkimer County, New York – January 3, 1900) was an American lawyer and politician from New York.

== Life ==
He was the son of George L. Edick (c.1797–1836) and Abigail Webster (Hatch) Edick (c.1804–1840). He attended the district schools and Oxford Academy. Then he studied law, was admitted to the bar, and practiced in Cooperstown. On February 6, 1866, he married Evileen H. Tunnicliff (1842–1904), and they had several children.

He was District Attorney of Otsego County from 1867 to 1871; Judge of the Otsego County Court from 1872 to 1877; and a member of the New York State Senate (20th D.) in 1878 and 1879.

He was buried at the Lakewood Cemetery in Cooperstown.

== Sources ==
- Civil List and Constitutional History of the Colony and State of New York compiled by Edgar Albert Werner (1884; pg. 291)
- The State Government for 1879 by Charles G. Shanks (Weed, Parsons & Co, Albany NY, 1879; pg. 61f)
- Edick genealogy at Get Man Data
- Edick genealogy at Schwald
- Tunnicliff-Edick at Family Tree Maker

New York State Senate
Preceded by David P. Loomis	New York State Senate; 20th District; 1878–1879	Succeeded by Dolphus S. Lynde
