= 1878 New York state election =

- November 5, 1878

The 1878 New York state election was held on November 5, 1878, to elect a judge of the New York Court of Appeals, as well as all members of the New York State Assembly and one member of the New York State Senate to sit in the 102nd New York State Legislature.

== History ==
Due to the increase of the Governor's term to three years, in 1878 there was only one officer to be elected statewide: a judge of the Court of Appeals, to fill the vacancy caused by the death of William F. Allen in June 1878. Samuel Hand had been appointed temporarily to fill the vacancy until the end of the year.

The National Labor-Greenback convention met on July 23 and 24 at Syracuse, New York. T. C. Daily was president. Ex-Secretary of State Gideon J. Tucker (in office 1858–1859) was nominated for the Court of Appeals after the first ballot in which he had an equal number of votes as James Wright, a lawyer from Elmira, who withdrew.

Although the state convention of 1877 had given the State Committee the option to nominate a candidate for the Court of Appeals (this being the only statewide elected official this year) without calling a state convention, the Republican boss Conkling preferred to assemble one to have a new State Committee elected. The Republican state convention met on September 26 at Saratoga Springs, New York. Roscoe Conkling was Temporary and Permanent Chairman. George F. Danforth was nominated for the Court of Appeals on the first ballot (vote: Danforth: 226, Joshua M. Van Cott 99, George W. Parsons 79).

== Result ==
The Republican judge was elected due to the "spoiler candidate" Tucker who diverted a large number of votes in New York City from the Democratic to the Greenback ticket.

Republican Thomas Murphy was elected to the New York State Senate.

97 Republicans 28 Democrats and 3 Green backers were declared elected to the New York State Assembly.

1878 state election result
Office	Republican ticket		Democratic ticket		Greenback ticket		Prohibition ticket	
Judge of the Court of Appeals	George F. Danforth	391,112	George B. Bradley	356,451	Gideon J. Tucker	75,133	William H. Van Cott	4,294

== See also ==
- New York gubernatorial elections

== Sources ==
- The tickets: THE NOVEMBER ELECTIONS in NYT on October 28, 1878
- Result: CANVASSING THE STATE VOTE in NYT on November 28, 1878
- Result: The Tribune Almanac 1879
