= George H. Arnold =

American pharmacist and politician

George Harrison Arnold (December 25, 1838 – July 14, 1883) was an American pharmacist and politician from New York.

== Life ==
He was born on December 25, 1838, in Truxton, New York, the son of George Arnold (died 1872) and Clarinda (Russell) Arnold (died 1894). He attended the common schools. Then he engaged in farming, and taught school during winters. During the American Civil War he joined the 44th New York Volunteer Infantry Regiment, and fought from 1861 to 1864. After the war he ran a drugstore, first in Truxton, and later in Cortland. In 1882, he sold the drugstore, and instead managed the Cortland Omnibus Company until his unexpected death during the next year.

Arnold entered politics as a Republican, and was Postmaster of Truxton. In 1872, he became a Liberal Republican, and soon after a Democrat. He joined the Greenback Party in 1878, and in November of that year was elected to the New York State Assembly. He polled 14 votes more than his Republican opponent. He was a member of the 102nd New York State Legislature in 1879.

He died on July 14, 1883, after suffering from typhoid pneumonia for two months; and was buried at the Tully Cemetery in Tully.

== Sources ==
New York State Assembly
Preceded by Orris U. Kellogg	New York State Assembly; Cortland County; 1879	Succeeded by Samuel A. Childs
