= George B. Deane Sr. =

American politician

George Bartch Deane, Sr. (May 27, 1818 – December 28, 1903) was an American politician from New York.

== Life ==
Deane was born on May 27, 1818, in Albany, New York. When he was two, he moved with his family to Manhattan. He lived most of his life in Greenwich Village.

Deane worked as a surveyor for the La Farge Insurance Company, and then for the Exchange Insurance Company. He later worked in the carting, storage, and forwarding business. For many years, he had the contract for carting for the United States Public Stores. He was initially a member of the Whig Party, and served as the last chairman of the Whig Committee in New York City. He later helped organize the Republican Party in New York City, and was a member of the Republican county committee in the city for thirty years.

In 1878, Deane was elected to the New York State Assembly as a Republican, representing the New York County Ninth District. He served in the Assembly in 1879 and 1880. His son, George B. Deane, Jr., represented the same district in the Assembly in 1874. In the 1896 presidential election, he was a presidential elector for William McKinley and Garret Hobart.

Deane died at home from pneumonia on December 28, 1903.

New York State Assembly
Preceded by John W. Browning	New York State Assembly; New York County, 9th District; 1879-1880	Succeeded by John W. Browning
