= Roderick Morison =

Scottish Gaelic poet and harpist

Roderick Morison (Scottish Gaelic: Ruairidh MacMhuirich), known as An Clàrsair Dall (The Blind Harper), was a Scottish Gaelic poet and harpist. He was born around 1646 in Bragar, Lewis and educated in Inverness, but he also learned to play the clàrsach (Celtic harp) as a profession. Later on, he moved to the Isle of Skye where he died around 1713. Morison is best known for his songs of praise for Gaelic aristocrats, for example MacLeod of Dunvegan and Iain Breac, MacLeod of Lewis.

== Legacy ==
The 1951 Edinburgh People's Festival Ceilidh brought Scottish traditional music to a large public stage for the first time inside Edinburgh's Oddfellows Hall and continued long afterwards at St. Columba's Church Hall in August 1951. The Scottish Gàidhealtachd was represented at the Celidh by Flora MacNeil, fellow Barra native Calum Johnston, and John Burgess. The music was recorded live at the scene by American musicologist Alan Lomax.

Towards the end of the Ceilidh, master of ceremonies Hamish Henderson announced that Calum Johnston would be performing Roderick Morison's Òran do Mhac Leoid Dhun Bheagain ("A Song to MacLeod of Dunvegan"). The song had been composed as a rebuke to Ruaridh Òg MacLeod, 19th Chief of Clan MacLeod of Dunvegan, (Note: Henderson erroneously named the target of the satire as being Roderick's successor Norman MacLeod, who was a child when Morison died.) for not fulfilling "the obligations of his office". Instead of patronizing the Bards and holding feasts at Dunvegan Castle for his clansmen, the Chief had become an absentee landlord in London, who, "spent his money on foppish clothes". Instead, Morison urged the Chief to emulate his predecessors. Henderson said of the song, "it's one of the great songs in the Gaelic tongue, and the poetic concept in it is very great. The poet says that he left the castle, and he found on the slopes of the mountain the echo of past mirth, the echo of his own singing. And he then has a conversation with the echo about the fate of the House of MacLeod."

== See also ==
- Clann MacMhuirich
