= Webster Wagner =

American politician

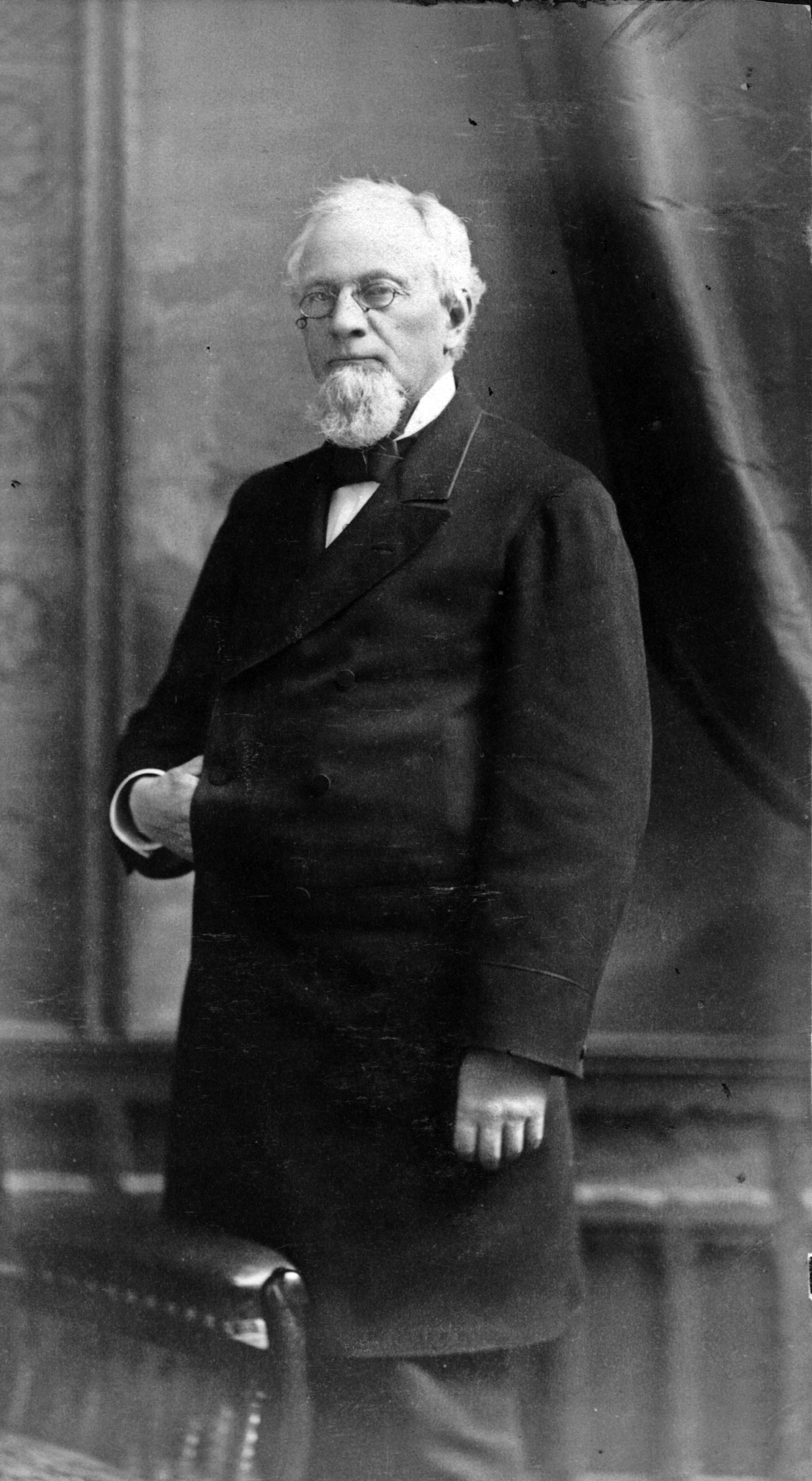
- Wagner shortly before his death in 1882
- Born: October 2, 1817; Palatine Bridge, New York, U.S.
- Died: January 13, 1882 (aged 64); Spuyten Duyvil, Bronx, New York
- Occupations: Inventor, businessman, politician
- Years active: 1853-82
- Known for: Inventing early railroad sleeper car

Webster Wagner (October 2, 1817 – January 13, 1882) was an American inventor, manufacturer and politician from New York.

== Life ==
Wagner was born near Palatine Bridge, New York. He developed a wagon-making business with his brother James. The business had folded by 1842, largely due to the Panic of 1837. After serving as an employee for the New York Central Railroad, Wagner invented the sleeping car and luxurious parlor car. He also perfected a system of ventilating railroad cars. His inventions were first used on the NY Central and later spread to other lines. He founded the Wagner Palace Car Company, located in Buffalo, New York. Several legal battles with the Pullman Company failed to put him and his partners out of business; at the time of his death the two companies were completing a merger.

He was married to Susan Davis, and they had five children.

He was a Republican member of the New York State Assembly (Montgomery Co.) in 1871; and of the New York State Senate from 1872 until his death, sitting in the 95th, 96th, 97th, 98th, 99th, 100th, 101st, 102nd (all eight 15th D.), 103rd, 104th and 105th New York State Legislatures (all three 18th D.).

Wagner was killed in the 1882 Spuyten Duyvil train wreck while returning from Albany to New York City when two trains of the New York Central and Hudson River Railroad collided in between the Kingsbridge and Spuyten Duyvil stations in The Bronx, two weeks into his sixth Senate term, on January 13, 1882. His body was found crushed between two of his company's cars.

Webster Wagner House at Palatine Bridge was added to the National Register of Historic Places in 1973.

== See also ==
- List of inventors killed by their own invention
- Rail Car Grand Isle: A preserved Wagner Palace car

== Notes ==
New York State Assembly
Preceded by James Shanahan	New York State Assembly; Montgomery County; 1871	Succeeded by William J. Van Dusen
New York State Senate
Preceded by Isaiah Blood	New York State Senate; 15th District; 1872–1879	Succeeded by Stephen H. Wendover
Preceded by Henry E. Turner	New York State Senate; 18th District; 1880–1882	Succeeded by Alexander B. Baucus
