= James F. Starbuck =

American politician (1816–1880)

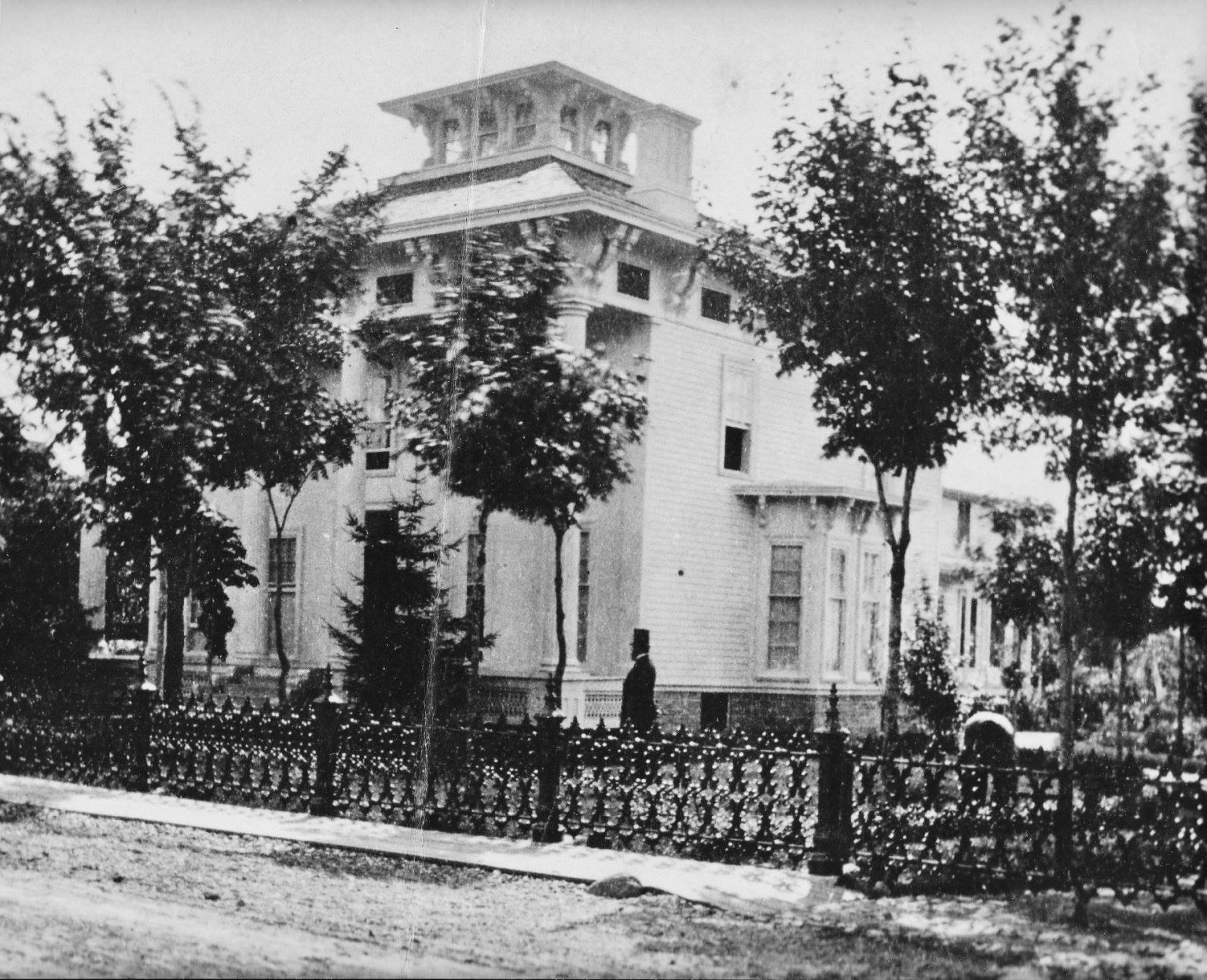
The Starbuck Mansion in Watertown, New York

James F. Starbuck (September 5, 1816 in Scipio, Cayuga County, New York – December 11, 1880) was an American lawyer and politician from New York.

== Life ==
His family removed to Niagara County, New York, when James was still an infant. He attended Western Reserve College in 1836. Then he studied law, was admitted to the bar in 1844, and practiced in Watertown.

He was one of the secretaries (with Henry W. Strong and Francis Seger) of the New York State Constitutional Convention of 1846. He was District Attorney of Jefferson County from 1851 to 1853.

He was a member of the New York State Senate (18th D.) in 1876 and 1877.

== Sources ==
- The New York Civil List compiled by Franklin Benjamin Hough, Stephen C. Hutchins and Edgar Albert Werner (1870; pg. 541)
- EX-SENATOR STARBUCK in NYT on December 12, 1880

New York State Senate
Preceded by Andrew C. Middleton	New York State Senate; 18th District; 1876–1877	Succeeded by Henry E. Turner
