= John W. Browning =

American journalist, lawyer and politician

John Walker Browning (June 10, 1842 in New York City – 1904) was an American journalist, lawyer and politician from New York.

== Life ==
He attended Public School No. 3 and then learned the trade of a bricklayer.

During the American Civil War, he enlisted in the 12th New York State Militia in April 1861, and was discharged in August. He enlisted in September 1861 in the 1st New York Engineers, and took part in the battles of Port Royal, Fort Pulaski, James Island and others in the Department of the South until December 1863 when he was discharged as a sergeant-major and brevet second lieutenant. He was a clerk in the U.S. Department of War from 1864 to 1867.

From 1868 to 1872 he was an inspector of the building department in New York City. He then became a journalist, and was the Albany correspondent of the New York Star and the New York Evening Express until 1877. He was a member of the New York State Assembly (New York Co., 9th D.) in 1878.

In November 1879 he was defeated for the State Senate by Republican Robert H. Strahan. In 1880, Browning unsuccessfully contested Strahan's election, and studied law. He was again a member of the State Assembly in 1881, was admitted to the bar later that year, and practiced in New York City. He was a member of the New York State Senate (8th D.) in 1882 and 1883.

In 1884, he removed to Denver, Colorado, and practiced law there. He was Assistant Postmaster of Denver from 1885 to 1888; and Melter of the U.S. Mint at Denver from 1888 to 1890.

He was buried at the Fairmount Cemetery in Denver.

== Sources ==
- Civil List and Constitutional History of the Colony and State of New York compiled by Edgar Albert Werner (1884; pg. 291, 377 and 380)
- STATE LEGISLATIVE WORK in NYT on January 21, 1880
- Sketches of the Members of the Legislatures in The Evening Journal Almanac (1883)
- NOMINATIONS BY THE PRESIDENT in NYT on May 15, 1888

New York State Assembly
Preceded by William H. Corsa	New York State Assembly; New York County, 9th District; 1878	Succeeded by George B. Deane, Sr.
Preceded by George B. Deane, Sr.	New York State Assembly; New York County, 9th District; 1881	Succeeded by James D. McClelland
New York State Senate
Preceded by Robert H. Strahan	New York State Senate; 8th District; 1882–1883	Succeeded by Frederick S. Gibbs
