= Erastus Brooks =

American politician

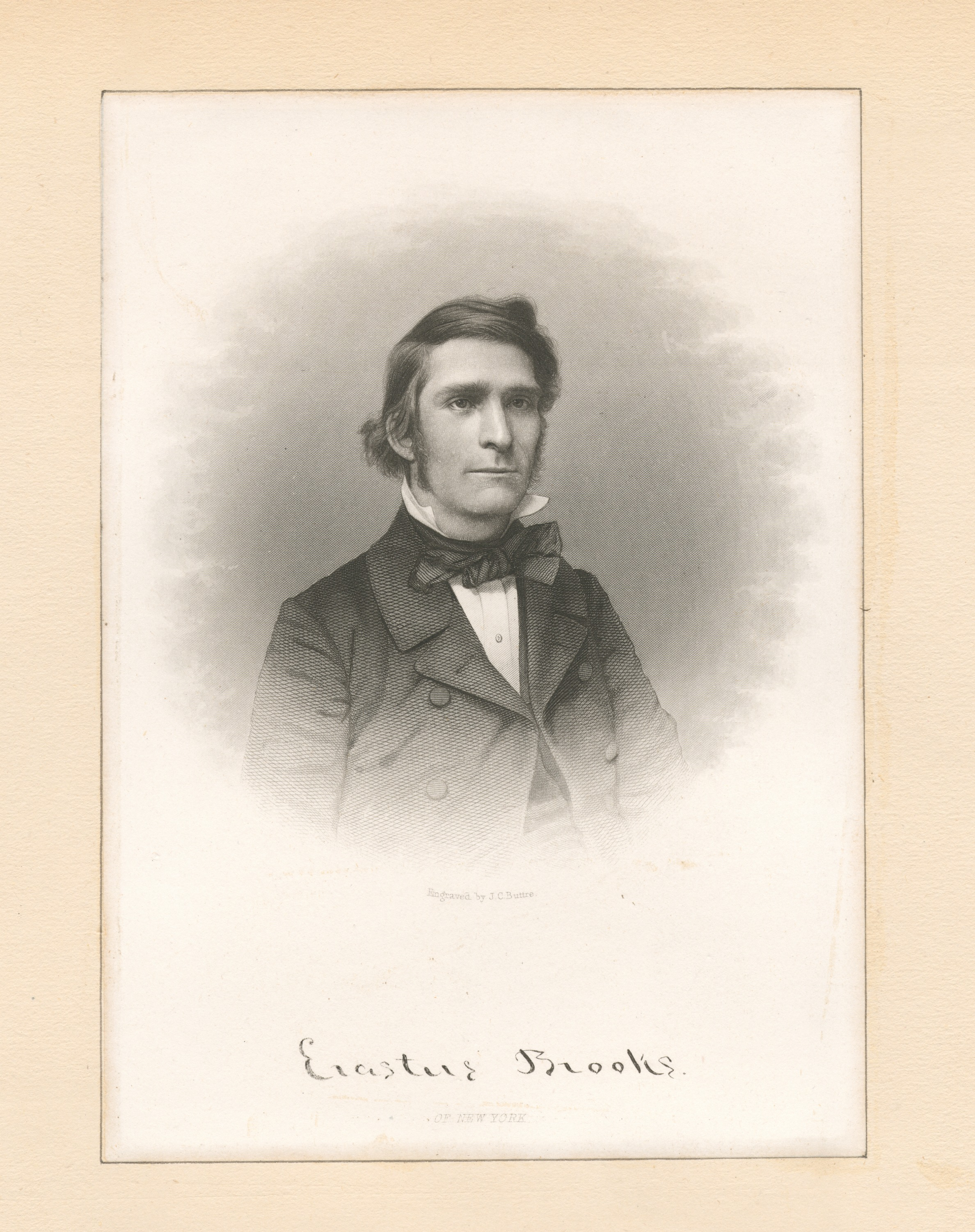
Erastus Brooks

Erastus Brooks (January 31, 1815 – November 25, 1886) was an American newspaper editor and politician from New York.

== Life ==
He was born on January 31, 1815, in Portland, then in the District of Maine, Massachusetts, the son of Capt. James Brooks who commanded the privateer Yankee during the War of 1812, and was lost at sea near the end of 1814. At age eight Erastus left home and began work as a messenger boy and shop clerk in Boston. Some time later he became a typesetter and later a printer.

He attended Brown University for two years, at the same time working as a printer to support himself and pay for tuition, but due to his financial distress did not graduate. He then taught school in Haverhill, Massachusetts, where he became editor of the Haverhill Gazette in June 1835. In 1836, his brother James Brooks (1810–1873) was one of the founders of the New York Daily Express and Erastus wrote articles and editorials for the paper.

In 1836, he went to Washington, D.C. as a special correspondent. In 1840, he returned to Portland and edited the Portland Advertiser, a Whig paper campaigning for William Henry Harrison. After the election, he carried the electoral vote of Maine to Washington, D.C., where he remained again until 1843 when he traveled to Europe. He returned on the packet ship Sheffield which was wrecked off Sandy Hook and lost his literary treasures picked up in Europe.

On January 12, 1844, he married Margaret Dawes Cranch (1819–1895), daughter of Chief Judge William Cranch (1769–1855), and they had seven children.

Erastus Brooks was a member of the New York State Senate (6th D.), first elected as a Whig, from 1854 to 1857, sitting in the 77th, 78th, 79th and 80th New York State Legislatures.

He was a delegate to the American Party national convention of 1856 in Philadelphia which nominated the Millard Fillmore/Andrew J. Donelson ticket for the 1856 United States presidential election.

At the 1856 New York state election, he ran on the American Party ticket for Governor of New York, but was defeated by Republican John A. King.

Brooks was a delegate to the Constitutional Union national convention of 1860 in Baltimore which nominated the John Bell/Edward Everett ticket for the 1860 United States presidential election.

He was a member of the New York State Assembly (Richmond Co.) in 1878, 1879, 1881, 1882 and 1883. He was the Democratic minority candidate for Speaker in 1878, 1879 and 1881; and Permanent Chairman of the Democratic state convention of 1881.

Brooks was one of the first trustees of Cornell University. Brooks lived the furthest from the campus of the original trustees, but he never during his twenty years as a trustee was absent from one of its meetings.

He died on November 25, 1886, in West New Brighton, Staten Island, of "inflammation of the bladder, pleurisy, and pneumonia," and was buried at the Moravian Cemetery in New Dorp, Staten Island.

== Sources ==
Party political offices
Preceded by Daniel Ullman	Know Nothing nominee for Governor of New York; 1856	Succeeded by Lorenzo Burrows
New York State Senate
Preceded by Edwin D. Morgan	New York State Senate; 6th District; 1854–1857	Succeeded by Richard Schell
New York State Assembly
Preceded by Kneeland S. Townsend	New York State Assembly; Richmond County; 1878–1879	Succeeded by Oliver Fiske
Preceded by Oliver Fiske	New York State Assembly; Richmond County; 1881–1883	Succeeded by Oliver Fiske
