= Louis S. Goebel =

American politician

Louis S. Goebel (July 9, 1839 in New York City – November 2, 1915 in Manhattan, NYC) was an American lawyer and politician from New York.

== Life ==
He graduated from City College of New York in 1864. Then he taught school, studied law at Columbia Law School, was admitted to the bar in 1868, and practiced in New York City.

He was a member of the New York State Senate (6th D.) in 1878 and 1879.

He died at his home at 338 West 87th Street in Manhattan, and was buried at the Kensico Cemetery.

== Sources ==
- Civil List and Constitutional History of the Colony and State of New York compiled by Edgar Albert Werner (1884; pg. 290)
- The State Government for 1879 by Charles G. Shanks (Weed, Parsons & Co, Albany NY, 1879; pg. 51)
- Lewis (sic) S. Goebel in NYT on November 4, 1915

New York State Senate
Preceded by Caspar A. Baaden	New York State Senate; 6th District; 1878–1879	Succeeded by Jacob Seebacher
