= Charles G. Shanks =

American journalist

Charles Gove Shanks
- Born: 1841; Shelbyville, Kentucky
- Died: July 24, 1895 (aged 54); Albany, New York
- Spouse: Amy C. Chamberlain

Charles Gove Shanks (1841 – July 24, 1895) was an associate editor of the Louisville Journal. In New York he worked for the New York Star and the Albany Times.

== Biography ==
Shanks was born in Shelbyville, Kentucky in 1841.

He served as an amanuensis for George D. Prentice, who edited the Louisville Journal (predecessor to The Courier-Journal) prior to the American Civil War. He fought for the Union Army with the 22nd Kentucky Infantry. He achieved the rank of First Lieutenant and was an aide de camp to General Lawlow by the end of the conflict.

Shanks became the night editor of the New York Herald at the conclusion of the Civil War. He was appointed state librarian of the New York Public Library by New York Secretary of State Allen C. Beach. Shanks served under John Bigelow on the Panama Canal investigating committee, a position he was appointed to by Governor Samuel J. Tilden. Afterwards he was an Albany correspondent for several New York newspapers.

== Family ==
His older brother, William F. G. Shanks, was a war correspondent who later edited The Bond Buyer of New York City. His sister, Sallie G. Shanks, was a contributor to Harper's Bazaar for three decades.

== Death ==
He died in Albany, New York in 1895 of heart disease at his home on Chapel Street.
