= Yes, Virginia (disambiguation) =

"Yes, Virginia, there is a Santa Claus" is a phrase from an 1897 editorial called Is There a Santa Claus?

Yes, Virginia may also refer to:

- Yes, Virginia, There Is a Santa Claus (film), a 1991 made-for-television Christmas family drama film
- Yes, Virginia... (album), 2006 album by the Dresden Dolls
- Yes, Virginia (TV program), Christmas television special that first aired in 2009
