= Santa Claus in film =

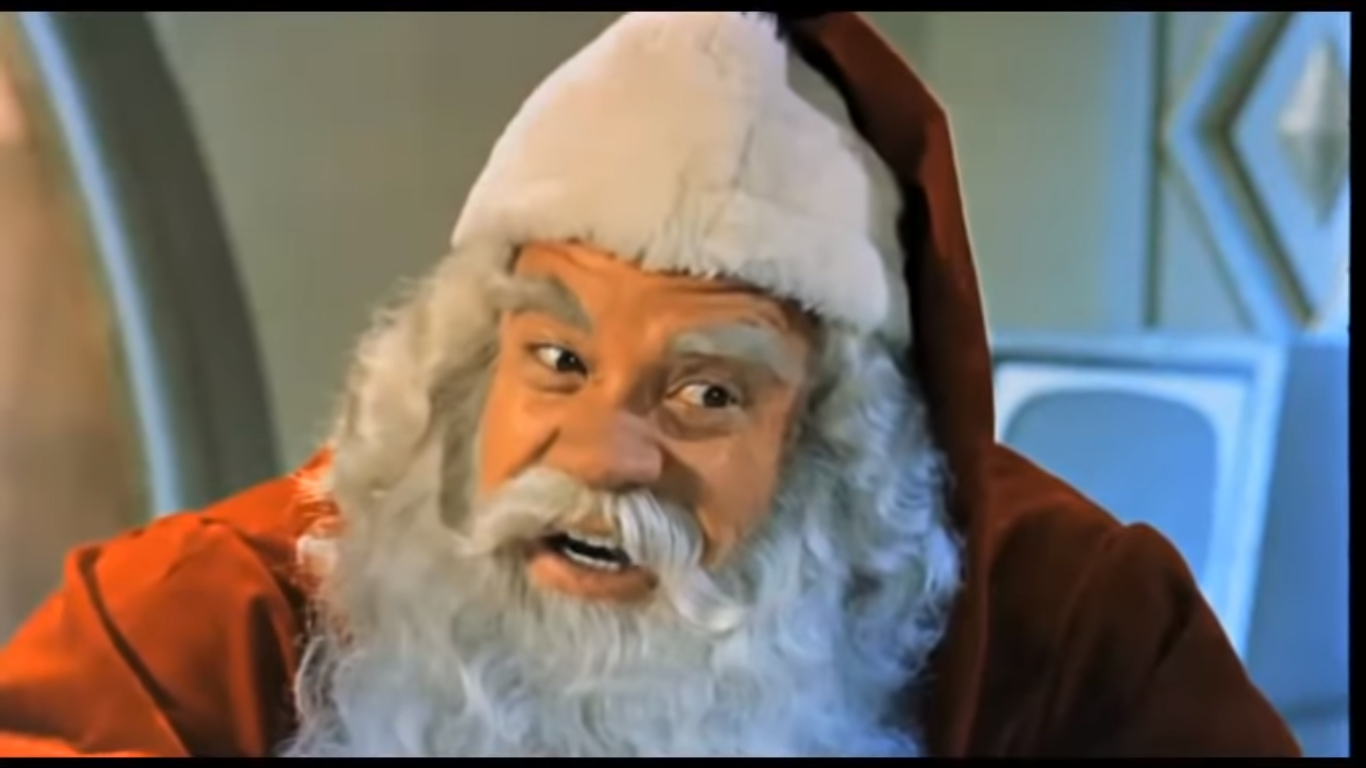
José Elías Moreno as Santa in the 1959 film Santa Claus

Motion pictures featuring Santa Claus constitute their own subgenre of the Christmas film genre.

== History ==
Early films of Santa revolve around similar simple plots of Santa's Christmas Eve visit to children. In 1897, in a short film called Santa Claus Filling Stockings, Santa Claus is simply filling stockings from his pack of toys. Another film called Santa Claus and the Children was made in 1898. A year later, a film directed by George Albert Smith titled Santa Claus (or The Visit from Santa Claus in the United Kingdom) was created. In this picture, Santa Claus enters the room from the fireplace and proceeds to trim the tree. He then fills the stockings that were previously hung on the mantel by the children. After walking backward and surveying his work, he suddenly darts at the fireplace and disappears up the chimney.

Santa Claus' Visit in 1900 featured a scene with two little children kneeling at the feet of their mother and saying their prayers. The mother tucks the children snugly in bed and leaves the room. Santa Claus suddenly appears on the roof, just outside the children's bedroom window, and proceeds to enter the chimney, taking with him his bag of presents and a little hand sled for one of the children. He goes down the chimney and suddenly appears in the children's room through the fireplace. He distributes the presents and mysteriously causes the appearance of a Christmas tree laden with gifts. The scene closes with the children waking up and running to the fireplace just too late to catch him by the legs. A 1909 film by D. W. Griffith titled A Trap for Santa Claus shows children setting a trap to capture Santa Claus as he descends the chimney, but instead capture their father who abandoned them and their mother but tries to burglarize the house after he discovers that she inherited a fortune. A 29-minute 1925 silent film production titled Santa Claus, by explorer/documentarian Frank E. Kleinschmidt, filmed partly in northern Alaska, feature Santa in his workshop, visiting his Inuit neighbors, and tending his reindeer. A year later, another movie titled Santa Claus was produced with sound on De Forest Phonofilm.

Over the years, various actors have played versions of Santa Claus, including Leedham Bantock in Santa Claus (1912), Monty Woolley in Life Begins at Eight-thirty (1942), Alberto Rabagliati in The Christmas That Almost Wasn't (1966), Dan Aykroyd in Trading Places (1983), Jan Rubes in One Magic Christmas (1985), David Huddleston in Santa Claus: The Movie (also 1985), Jonathan Taylor Thomas in I'll Be Home for Christmas (1998), Ed Asner in The Story of Santa Claus (1996), Olive, the Other Reindeer (1999), Ellen's First Christmas (2001), Elf (2003), Regular Show: The Christmas Special (2012), Elf: Buddy's Musical Christmas (2014), Santa Stole Our Dog: A Merry Doggone Christmas! (2017) and A StoryBots Christmas (also 2017), J. K. Simmons in Klaus (2019) and Red One (2024) and Brian Cox in That Christmas (also 2024).

== Themes ==
=== Santa's origins ===
Some films about Santa Claus seek to explore his origins. They explain how his reindeer can fly, where the elves come from, and other questions that children have generally asked about Santa. Two Rankin/Bass stop motion animation television specials addressed this issue: the first, Santa Claus Is Comin' to Town (1970), with Mickey Rooney as the voice of Kris Kringle, reveals how Santa delivered toys to children despite the fact that the evil Burgermeister Meisterburger had forbidden children to play with them; and the second, The Life and Adventures of Santa Claus (1985), based on L. Frank Baum's 1902 children's book of the same name, follows Santa being reared by a collection of mythical creatures who finally grant him immortality. Another animated version of Baum's book was made by Glen Hill in 2000, and the book also served as the basis for an anime series, Shounen Santa no Daibôken (Young Santa's Adventures) in 1994 and The Oz Kids video, Who Stole Santa? (1996). None of these films focus on Santa Claus's saintly origins.

The 1985 feature film Santa Claus: The Movie, inspired by the 1978 Superman: The Movie, stars David Huddleston as Santa Claus and British actress Judy Cornwell as his wife Anya, shows how Santa and Anya are discovered by a clan of elves called the Vendequm. Dudley Moore portrays Patch, the central character and main focus of the story; Burgess Meredith portrays their wise leader, the Ancient One, who reveals that Claus represents the fulfillment of an ancient prophecy, whereby he has been designated as "the Chosen One", whose mission it will be to deliver the elves' toys to children all over the world. The film's prologue features Claus and Anya performing Santa-like duties in their home village, and strongly suggests Santa's saintly origins.

The 2007 Finnish film Christmas Story explains Santa's origin as an orphan boy in Lapland named Nikolas.

The 2019 animated Netflix Christmas comedy Klaus, also features its own telling of the origin of Santa. Where Jesper Johansen, the pampered spoiled son of a postmaster general (played by Jason Schwartzman) is sent to the secluded town of Smeerensburg, as their latest postman. There Jesper learns that due to a local family feud, the town’s people hardly have time for anything else, let alone writing or exchanging letters. There he reluctantly teams up with the titular Santa Claus (played by J. K. Simmons) who is portrayed as gruff hermit, with a sad past and a skilled hand for woodcarving and toy making. Together, they not only help end the feud in Smeerensburg, but also create one of the most beloved holiday traditions.

=== Questioning and believing ===
A Little Girl Who Did Not Believe in Santa Claus (1907)

Another genre of Santa Claus films seeks to dispel doubts about his existence.

- One of the first films of this nature was titled A Little Girl Who Did Not Believe in Santa Claus (1907) and involves a well-to-do boy trying to convince his poorer friend that Santa Claus is real. She doubts because Santa has never visited her family because of their poverty.
- Miracle on 34th Street (1947), starring Natalie Wood as Susan Walker, revolves around the disbelief of young Susan, whose mother (Maureen O'Hara) employs a kind old man (Edmund Gwenn, who won an Academy Award for Best Supporting Actor) to play Santa Claus at Macy's; he later convinces Susan that he really is Santa.
- One Magic Christmas (1985) depicts Santa as Saint Nicholas, in charge of Christmas angels (deceased people) in lieu of elves, whom he assigns to restore individuals' Christmas spirit. He assigns Gideon (Harry Dean Stanton) to a woman (Mary Steenburgen) who worries too much about the practical side of life and shows little charity. Gideon shows her a potential Christmas in which her husband is killed by a desperate bank robber whom she has neglected to help, and takes her little girl to Santa, who gives her the last letter her mother sent him as a child and tells her to give it to her. This works to restore her spirit and gives her a do-over of Christmas with her husband and the desperate man, and she greets Santa putting presents under her tree.
- The Polar Express (2004), based on the children's book of the same name, also deals with issues and questions of belief as a magical train conducted by Tom Hanks transports a doubting boy to the North Pole to visit Santa Claus.
- Yes, Virginia (2009) is an animated holiday TV special based on the true story of a young girl, Virginia O'Hanlon, who writes a letter to the editor of the New York Sun in 1897 after her friends tell her that there is no Santa. The newspaper editor tells her that indeed there is a Santa: "He lives, and he lives forever." Francis Pharcellus Church was the real-life editor played by Charles Bronson in the special.

=== Santa as a hero ===
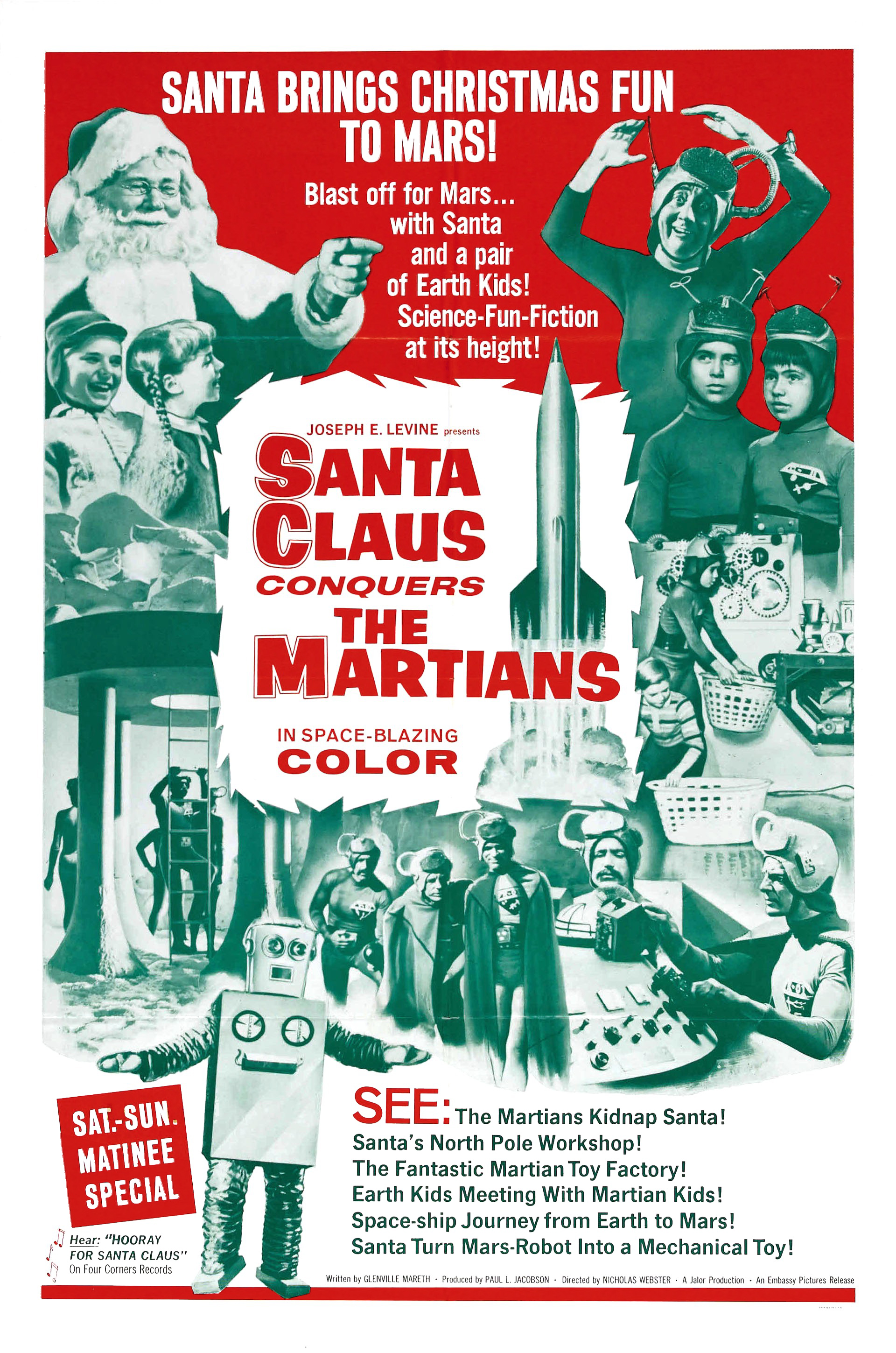
Theatrical release poster for the 1964 film Santa Claus Conquers the Martians

Some science fiction B movies feature Santa Claus as a superhero-type figure, such as the 1959 film titled Santa Claus produced in Mexico with José Elías Moreno as Santa Claus. In this movie, Santa allies with Merlin the magician to battle the devil, who is attempting to trap Santa. In the Cold War-era film Santa Claus Conquers the Martians (1964), Santa Claus is captured by Martians and brought to Mars, and ultimately foils a plot to destroy him.

In the 1984 film The Night They Saved Christmas, starring Art Carney as Santa, likewise chronicles how Santa Claus and Claudia Baldwin (Jaclyn Smith), the wife of an oil explorer, have to save the North Pole from explosions while Baldwin's husband is searching for oil in the Arctic. Santa Claus: The Movie contains a subplot in which Santa Claus rescues Joe (Christian Fitzpatric) from his best friend Cornelia's (Carrie Kei Heim) evil step-uncle B. Z. (John Lithgow). Santa is a hero in The Nightmare Before Christmas, held captive by Oogie Boogie, although he is spiteful and enraged at Jack when freed. The 2004 film Christmas With the Kranks, based on the 2001 John Grisham novel Skipping Christmas, has Austin Pendleton as Marty, a Santa-dressed umbrella salesman who turns out to be the real Santa, saving Luther Krank's (Tim Allen's) forced Christmas party by capturing a burglar unintentionally brought to the house by the police. After leaving the party, he rides through the sky in his Volkswagen Beetle, pulled by reindeer. In the 2005 film adaptation of The Chronicles of Narnia: The Lion, the Witch and the Wardrobe, Father Christmas (James Cosmo) supplies the Pevensie children with the weapons and tools they need to battle the White Witch (Tilda Swinton). In the 2012 DreamWorks film Rise of the Guardians, which is based on the book series The Guardians of Childhood by William Joyce, Santa (Alec Baldwin) is shown as one of the main characters and leader of the Guardians, who are the heroes of the movie. The 2022 film Violent Night portrays a drunk and disillusioned Santa (played by David Harbour) caught up in a hostage situation and becoming an action hero, parodying the film Die Hard and its protagonist John McClane.

In the television show South Park, Santa is often depicted with firearms; in the episode "Red Sleigh Down", he battles Iraqis to try to bring Christmas to Iraq. In the episode "A Woodland Critter Christmas", he uses a combat shotgun to blast away Satanic animals who try to give birth to the AntiChrist. Santa (played by Nick Frost) made a brief appearance at the end of the Doctor Who episode, "Death in Heaven". In the following episode, which served as the show's 2014 Christmas special, "Last Christmas", he plays a more prominent role. It is eventually revealed that the scenes with him are the characters experiencing a shared dream, and he is their subconscious trying to help them wake up before they are killed. At the episode's end, he successfully awakens the Doctor and Clara, reuniting the two.

=== Succession of Santas ===
One genre of movies suggests that Santa Claus is not historically a single individual but a succession of individuals.

In Ernest Saves Christmas (1988), Ernest P. Worrell (Jim Varney) joins the challenge of Santa Claus, alias Seth Applegate (Douglas Seale), to convince Florida kids' show host Joe Carruthers (Oliver Clark) to become the next Santa.

In The Santa Clause (1994), Tim Allen plays Scott Calvin, who accidentally causes Santa Claus to fall off the roof of his house. After he puts on Santa's suit, he finds himself contractually obligated to become the next Santa. Reluctant at first, his appearance changes over the next year from average to the legendary image: he grows fat, his hair whitens, and his beard grows uncontrollably by magic. He ultimately falls in love with his new role.

A 2001 television special, Call Me Claus, stars Whoopi Goldberg as Lucy Cullins, an African American woman destined to reluctantly become the next Santa Claus.

In The Hebrew Hammer (2003), the role of Santa Claus is traditionally passed down from father to son. The system is disrupted when the reigning Santa is murdered by his son, Damian, who then uses the position to attack the competing holidays of Hanukkah and Kwanzaa.

The 2011 animated film Arthur Christmas portrays being Santa Claus as a dynasty. The first "Santa", Saint Nicholas, established the North Pole workshop and passed the title and responsibilities to his son after 70 Christmases, after which his son passed them on to his son, and so on. In the film, the current Santa initially refuses to retire, due to worry about what he will be if he is not Santa.

=== Impostor Santas ===
Several films have been created which explore the consequences should an impostor Santa take over.

One of the first films featuring a fake Santa Claus is the 1914 silent film, The Adventure of the Wrong Santa Claus, written by Frederic Arnold Kummer. In this film, a bogus Santa steals all the Christmas presents and amateur detective Octavius (played by Herbert Yost) tries to recover them.

The most notorious impostor appears in the 1966 cartoon based on Dr. Seuss's 1957 children's book, How the Grinch Stole Christmas!, wherein the Grinch, a hairy and mean-tempered creature, attempts to rob the Whos in Whoville of their Christmas by stealing their presents, food and decorations, but has a change of heart when he sees that he has not stopped them from celebrating after all. This animated feature was made into a live-action movie in 2000, directed by Ron Howard and starring Jim Carrey as the Grinch. A CGI feature film was made in 2018, starring Benedict Cumberbatch as the voice of the Grinch.

Another less-than-friendly impostor appears in A Christmas Story (1983) as a disgruntled mall Santa at Higbee's Department Store (a real store in downtown Cleveland, Ohio) in the fictional town of Holman, Indiana. Played by Jeff Gillen, Santa is depicted as a larger-than-life figure who terrifies, rather than amuses, children. Gillen's performance lends credence to the theory that the mall Santa is not quite genuine.

Another recent devious mall Santa was played by Billy Bob Thornton in Bad Santa (2003), a film which gained the normally family-friendly Disney "bad press".

Tim Burton's stop-action animated musical film, The Nightmare Before Christmas (1993), depicts Jack Skellington, the Pumpkin King of Halloween Town, wanting to become Santa Claus after an accidental visit to Christmas Town. After the mostly well-meaning but totally clueless Halloween Town citizens capture Santa, they then try to take over Christmas with disastrous results; children are terrified by Jack's Halloween-themed gifts, and the real Santa is almost killed by Oogie Boogie. Santa is voiced here by Ed Ivory and in the video game spinoffs by Corey Burton.

In 2002's The Santa Clause 2: The Mrs. Clause, Scott Calvin (Tim Allen) must leave the North Pole to find a wife, so his number one elf turns a plastic toy Santa into a life-size robot clone of Calvin to cover for him. The robo-Santa interprets the rules of Christmas literally, convinces himself that all of the world's children are naughty, and dresses and runs the North Pole like a Latin American dictator, constructing an army of giant toy soldiers. When Calvin returns with his wife, he must defeat his clone to regain control of Christmas.

In 2006's The Santa Clause 3: The Escape Clause, Martin Short appears as Jack Frost, who is jealous of Santa Claus. He usurps the role from Scott Calvin, turns Christmas into "Frostmas" and the North Pole into a Disneyesque tourist resort, and addicts the worlds' children to toys which their parents must buy from him.

In 2007's Fred Claus, Vince Vaughn plays Santa's jealous older brother who grows up hating Santa and Christmas. He cons his brother (Paul Giamatti) into giving him a large sum of money for a business deal, in return for which he must come to the Pole and help prepare for Christmas. Fred ends up sabotaging his brother by placing all the world's naughty children on the nice list. Meanwhile, another Santa-hater (Kevin Spacey) is auditing Santa, looking for excuses to fire him and the elves. When Santa injures his back, Fred must deliver the gifts in order to save Christmas.

Other, darker impostors have appeared in slasher films such as the first three films of the five-film Silent Night, Deadly Night series, Santa Claws and Santa's Slay, and in the short "...And All Through the House", part of the horror anthology film Tales from the Crypt (1972) and later remade as episode 1.2 and directed by Robert Zemeckis for the HBO TV series of the same name. Both versions were inspired by the comic book Tales from the Crypt.

David Howard Thornton portrays Art the Clown in Terrifier 3, wearing a Santa suit after killing a department-store Santa Claus played by Daniel Roebuck.

== See also ==
- Christmas elves in films and television
- Mrs. Claus in popular culture
- List of Christmas films
- Christmas horror
