= Yes, Virginia (TV program) =

2009 American animated TV special

- Created by: Wayne Best; Matt MacDonald
- Based on: Yes, Virginia, there is a Santa Claus
- Written by: Wayne Best; Matt MacDonald; Chris Plehal
- Screenplay by: Chris Plehal
- Directed by: Pete Circuitt
- Voices of: Neil Patrick Harris; Bea Miller; Jennifer Love Hewitt; Kieran Patrick Campbell; Andrew Cherry; Taylor Hay; Nicholas Sireci; Julian Franco; Michael Buscemi; Alfred Molina
- Composer: Nicholas Hooper
- Country of origin: United States
- Original language: English

Production
- Executive producers: Dexton Deboree; Mick Ebeling; Chet Fenster; Harvey Marco
- Producer: Ted Rogers
- Editors: Darwin Ignacio; Matt Ahrens
- Running time: 22 minutes
- Production companies: The Ebeling Group; JWT Productions; MEC:Active Engagement; Macy's; Starz Animation

Original release
- Network: CBS
- Release: December 11, 2009

Yes, Virginia is an animated Christmas television special created by Wayne Best and Matt MacDonald, and produced by JWT Productions, The Ebeling Group, and Starz Animation, with sponsorship from Macy's. It first aired December 11, 2009 on CBS. It was based on Francis Pharcellus Church's famous 1897 editorial, "Yes, Virginia, there is a Santa Claus" in The (New York) Sun. The special featured the voice talents of Bea Miller as Virginia O'Hanlon and Neil Patrick Harris as her father, Philip.

There was a previous animated special, Yes, Virginia, There Is a Santa Claus, broadcast in 1974.

== See also ==
- List of Christmas films
- Santa Claus in film
