= William Conant Church =

Union United States Army officer (1836–1917)

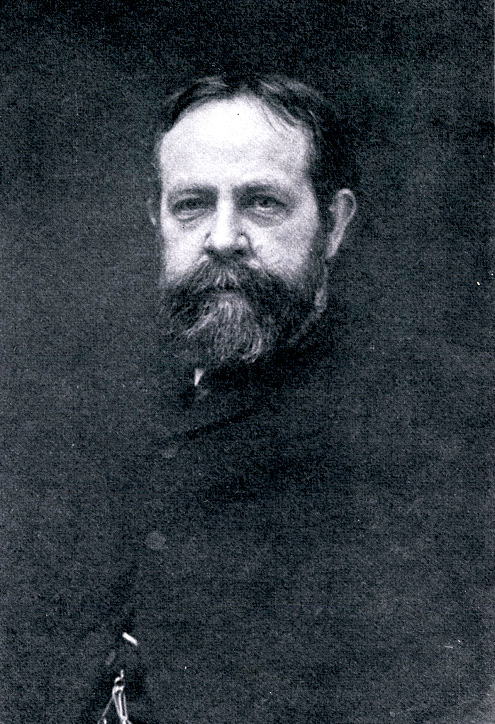
- William Conant Church c. 1900 after a photograph in Biographical Sketches of Distinguished Officers of the Army and Navy

President of the National Rifle Association of America
- In office 1872–1875

Personal details
- Born: August 11, 1836 Rochester, New York, U.S.
- Died: May 23, 1917 (aged 80) Manhattan, New York, U.S.
- Relatives: Francis Pharcellus Church (brother)
- Occupation: Journalist, editor

Military service
- Allegiance: United States
- Branch/service: Union Army
- Rank: Lieutenant colonel
- Battles/wars: American Civil War

William Conant Church (August 11, 1836 – May 23, 1917) was an American journalist, author and soldier. He was publisher of several newspapers and magazines in association with his father and brother. He was the co-founder and second president of the National Rifle Association of America.

== Life and work ==
Church was born in Rochester, New York on August 11, 1836, to the Reverend Pharcellus Church. He was educated in the Boston Latin School. While still a youth, he helped his father edit and publish the New York Chronicle.

In 1860, he became publisher of The Sun and of the New York Chronicle. In 1861–62 he was Washington correspondent of The New York Times.

He resigned his journalistic position on his appointment as captain in the United States Volunteers in 1862, and served for one year, receiving brevets of major and lieutenant colonel.

In 1863, he and his brother, Francis Pharcellus Church, established The Army and Navy Journal, which published under various names for 151 years, ending its run in 2014 as Armed Forces Journal. In 1866, the pair founded the Galaxy Magazine.

Church regularly called for a better standard of marksmanship amongst militia and National Guard soldiers. In August 1871 he wrote in The Army and Navy Journal that “An association should be organized in this city [New York] to promote and encourage rifle-shooting on a scientific basis. The National Guard is to-day too slow in getting about this reform,”. With George Wood Wingate, he established the National Rifle Association of America that year, and in 1872 he replaced its first president, the retired general Ambrose Burnside.

Church was government commissioner to inspect the Northern Pacific Railroad in 1882.

He wrote two biographies, of John Ericsson in 1891, and Ulysses S. Grant in 1899. He published the Army and Navy Journal. In one issue he criticized the living arrangements aboard USS Monitor, a vessel built by John Ericsson.

Church was also one of the founders of the Metropolitan Museum of Art, an original member of the Military Order of the Loyal Legion of the United States, and became a director and lifetime member of the New York Zoological Society.

Church died on May 23, 1917. His funeral took place at Grace Church in Lower Manhattan.

National Rifle Association of America
Preceded by Ambrose Burnside	President of the NRA; 1872–1875	Succeeded by Alexander Shaler
