= Holland Society of New York =

Historical and genealogical society

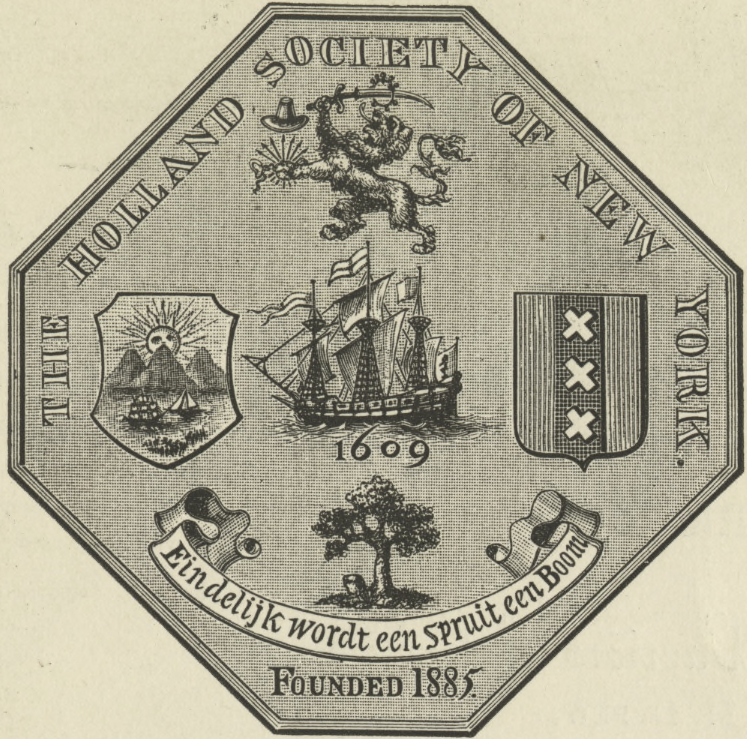
The Society's logo

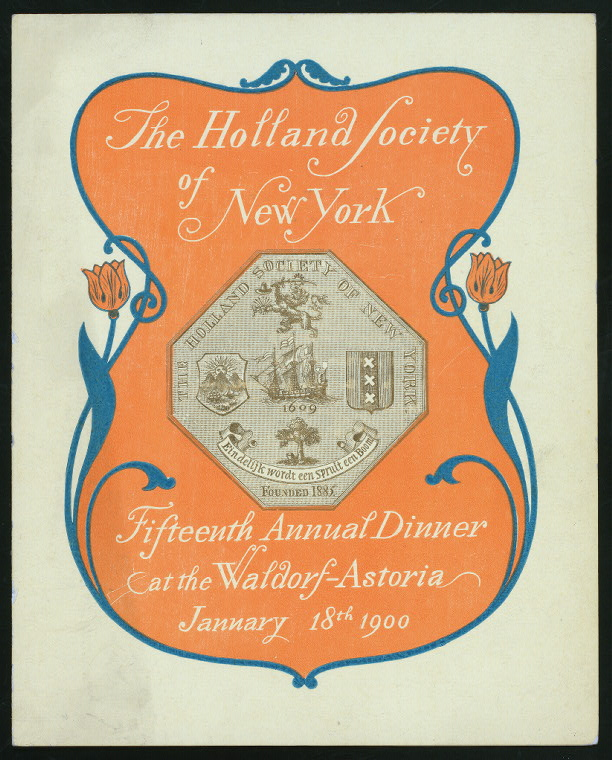
Program for the Holland Society's 15th Annual Dinner, January 18, 1900, Waldorf-Astoria Hotel, New York City.

The Holland Society of New York is a historical and genealogical society founded in 1885 in New York City. Its primary goal is to gather and preserve information about the settlement and history of New Netherland, a Dutch colony in North America. The society focuses on researching and documenting the lives and experiences of the colony's inhabitants, its political, social, and religious patterns. It supports genealogical research and publishes historical publications.

The Holland Society is known for initiating projects such as the New Netherland Project, begun in 1974, which translates and publishes 17th-century records from the New York State Archives.

Membership in the society is open to both males and females, who are directly descended from an ancestor who lived in New Netherland before or during 1675.

The Holland Society's library holds approximately 7,000 books, including local histories, family histories, genealogies, and reference materials. It also features a comprehensive collection of vertical files containing letters, photographs, genealogies, and press clippings.

== Notable members ==
Notable members of the Holland Society have included film director Cecil B. DeMille, actors Humphrey Bogart and Henry Fonda, presidents Theodore Roosevelt and Franklin D. Roosevelt, and author John Updike.

Other documented members include physicist and Nobel laureate John Hasbrouck Van Vleck, diplomat Stanley K. Hornbeck, general Cortlandt V. R. Schuyler, comptroller general Elmer B. Staats, congressmen Norman F. Lent and Peter H. B. Frelinghuysen, and conductor Edwin Outwater. Each received the Society's Members' Distinguished Achievement Medal.

Prominent early members and leaders included New York judge Hooper C. Van Vorst, the Society's first president; congressman and diplomat Robert Roosevelt, one of its incorporators and its president in 1890; judges Augustus Van Wyck, Robert A. Van Wyck, and Alphonso T. Clearwater; politician and philanthropist James William Beekman; congressman and transportation entrepreneur John H. Starin; and surgeon Albert Vander Veer.

== Mission and Objectives ==
The constitutional aims of the Holland Society of New York, as set out in Article II of its constitution, first adopted on April 10, 1885, and most recently amended on April 24, 2021, focus on preserving and advancing Dutch-American heritage. These include gathering and safeguarding information on the early history and settlement of New Netherland by the Dutch, as well as identifying, collecting, and maintaining records related to the genealogy and historical experiences of Dutch settlers. The society also seeks to honor the memory of its members while promoting the values and principles associated with them.

Additional objectives involve developing a library of books, monographs, pamphlets, and manuscripts concerning the Dutch presence in America; preparing and delivering scholarly papers on Dutch history and genealogy; and publishing compiled works that contribute to a commemorative historical record emphasizing Dutch influence on American society, institutions, and development. The organization further supports religious, literary, educational, moral, philanthropic, and artistic initiatives aligned with these purposes. Collectively, these goals underscore a commitment to preserving the legacy of Dutch exploration and colonization, beginning with Henry Hudson's 1609 voyage aboard De Halve Maen into New York Harbor, which initiated Dutch engagement with the region, followed by settlement around 1623 and governance of New Netherland until its transfer to English control in 1664, aside from a brief period of restoration between 1673 and 1674.

The original 1885 constitution also highlighted the importance of fostering social connections among descendants of early Dutch settlers to sustain Dutch customs and cultural traits within American life. This emphasis on community complemented the society's academic and preservation-focused mission, helping ensure that Dutch traditions and values were passed down through successive generations.
