= The Galaxy (magazine) =

American monthly magazine

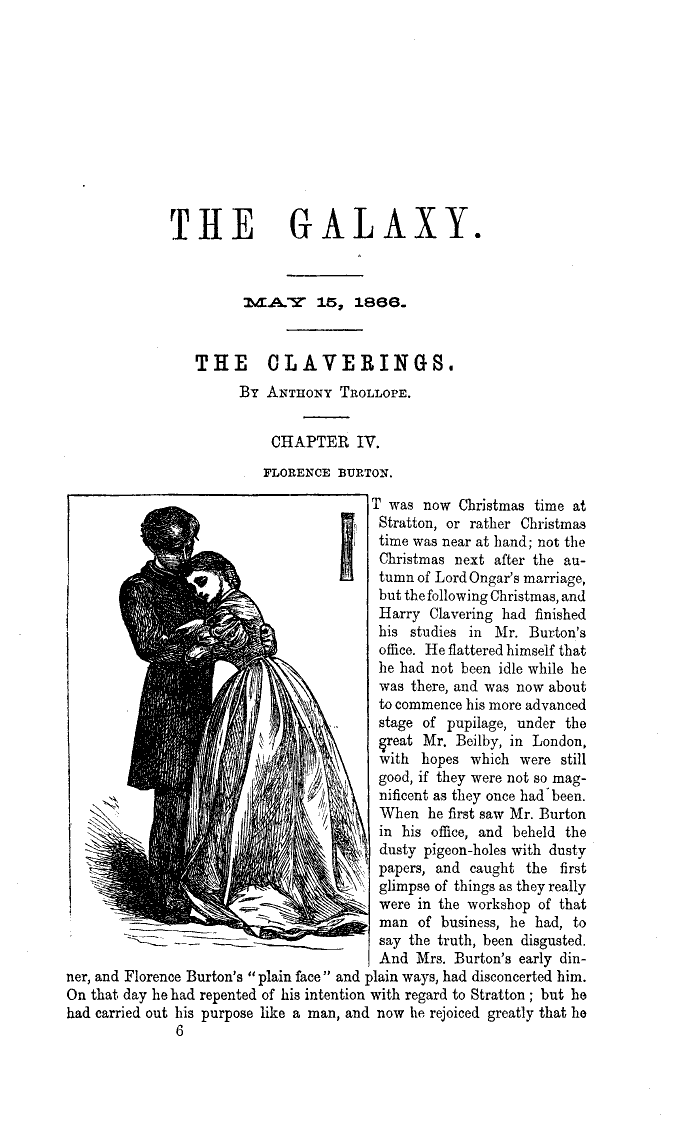
- The Galaxy Vol. 1 Issue 2, May 15, 1866, featuring an excerpt of The Claverings by Anthony Trollope
- Frequency: Monthly
- Publisher: W.C. and F. P. Church
- Founder: W.C. and F. P. Church
- Founded: 1866
- First issue: May 1, 1866
- Final issue: 1878
- Country: United States
- Based in: New York City
- Language: English

Galaxy Magazine, or The Galaxy, was an American monthly magazine founded by William Conant Church and his brother Francis P. Church in 1866. In 1868, Sheldon and Company gained financial control of the magazine and it was eventually absorbed by The Atlantic Monthly in 1878. Notable contributors to the magazine include Mark Twain, Walt Whitman, Ion Hanford Perdicaris and Henry James.

== History ==
In 1861, after the start of the Civil War, William Church served as a war correspondent for the New York Evening Post and later for The New York Times. In 1863, after leaving the war behind, William and his brother started the Army and Navy Journal, and in 1866 they started Galaxy magazine. Oliver Wendell Holmes, who had named The Atlantic Monthly, may have named the new magazine.

The Church brothers published and edited the magazine for two years from 1866 to 1868. The publishing house of Sheldon and Company took over publishing in 1868, and ten years later in 1878 Sheldon ceased publication of the magazine and it was absorbed into The Atlantic. Francis Church later went to work as an editorial writer for the New York Sun, where he wrote the Christmas editorial commonly referred to as "Yes, Virginia, there is a Santa Claus."

== Notable contributors ==
After the magazine went into publication in 1866, besides the Church brothers working as editors, Frederic Beecher Perkins, a well known librarian and an experienced editor, was an office editor and Richard Grant White was an editorial contributor who wrote special articles for the magazine. As departments were added to the Galaxy, other writers were added. George E. Pond, who had been associate editor of the Army and Navy Journal, wrote an editorial column (mainly political) called "Drift-Wood" under the name of "Phillip Quilibet", and S.S. Conant, who was editor of Harper's Weekly, wrote and critiqued for the Galaxy's fine arts department. James F. Meline contributed reviews of French and German books, while Professor E.L. Youmans, edited the "Scientific Miscellany" from 1871 to 1874. Carl Benson, in private life known as Charles Astor Bristed, wrote for the department called "Casual Cogitations".

The Galaxy published many of Henry James's early short stories, including "A Day of Days" (1866), "A Light Man" (1869) and "Madame de Mauves" (1874). Mark Twain wrote a column called "Memoranda" for the magazine from 1870 to 1871. Twain's introductory column announced that his department would carry "ample dissertations upon political economy". Twain went on to contribute over eighty pieces to the Galaxy, which paid him $20 per page for his monthly column, more than double its regular rate.

In December 1866, The Galaxy published the first biographical essay of the poet Walt Whitman, written by his friend John Burroughs, titled "Walt Whitman and His Drum-Taps." The magazine went on to publish four poems by Whitman, A Carol of Harvest (1867), Brother of All with Generous Hand (1870), Warble for Lilac-Time (1870), and 0 Star of France (1871). The Galaxy also printed the beginnings of Whitman's essay Democratic Vistas in two articles. The first part titled Democracy, was published in December 1867 and the second part, Personalism, appeared in May 1868. Edward F. Grier wrote about the poet: "Whitman's position as a Galaxy author was important to his personal fortunes and his literary reputation. The Galaxy was respectable, it was popular, and it paid generously. It also provided a venue where Whitman could join with other writers in exploring the meaning of literary nationalism and cultural democracy for the new era."

== See also ==
- List of literary magazines
- Essay
- Short story
- Sequel to Drum-Taps
