= Yes, Virginia, There Is a Santa Claus (film) =

- Genre: Family; Christmas; Drama
- Directed by: Charles Jarrott
- Starring: Charles Bronson; Katharine Isabelle; Richard Thomas; Ed Asner
- Music by: Charles Bernstein
- Countries of origin: United States; Canada
- Original language: English

Production
- Production location: Vancouver

Original release
- Network: ABC
- Release: December 1, 1991

Yes, Virginia, there is a Santa Claus, is a 1991 made-for-television Christmas family drama film directed by Charles Jarrott. The film is based on the story behind the widely reprinted 1897 editorial by Francis Pharcellus Church written in response to a letter by eight-year-old Virginia O'Hanlon asking whether Santa Claus was real. It stars Charles Bronson, Katharine Isabelle, Richard Thomas, and Ed Asner. Produced by Andrew J. Fenady, it premiered on ABC on December 1, 1991.

The script was initially taking a direction that was more oriented for children's Saturday morning show before taking a dramatic approach. Action film actor Charles Bronson loved the script and accepted to act against type. Also acting against type is Richard Thomas, known for playing sensible characters, playing a tough Irish immigrant.

Yes, Virginia, There Is a Santa Claus received mixed reactions, with praise for its performances and production values. Bronson’s portrayal was seen as convincing, and the film was noted for its fresh dialogue, memorable musical score, and exceptional period-piece production. Some found it better than most TV films, particularly impressed by certain performances. However, others criticized the acting as either overdone or too subdued, and felt the film was overly sentimental and predictable. While the concept was appreciated, many thought the execution felt contrived and familiar, lacking the emotional impact expected from a holiday movie.

== Production ==
Producer Andrew J. Fenady explained that the project was unusual since he is known for tougher projects. On developing the script, he said "I added a lot of the newspaper stuff. The script originally was more like a Saturday children's show".

On the casting of Charles Bronson, he said, "we sent it to him, and he loved it, I think he really related to it. It was so against type". At the time, Bronson had recently lost his wife of 20 years and since in the film, Bronson's character also lost his wife he was asked about it and denied any parallels.

Richard Thomas, known for playing sensible characters, had to adapt in order to play an Irish immigrant. Fenady explained that "we got someone to teach him the manly art of self-defense. He did a lot of the stunts himself".

On casting Katharine Isabelle for the role of Virginia O'Hanlon, Fenady said "we lined up every 8-year-old in Los Angeles. We had a casting director up in Vancouver where we shot and he asked us to look at a tape. When we saw it we knew we had found Virginia.

On shooting a Christmas movie in Vancouver during the summer, Fenady said "we shot in June and July when it was 99 degrees. We had to use $40,000 worth of ice and we literally snowed in Stanley Park and the other places we shot".

== Reception ==
Linda Renaud of The Hollywood Reporter thought the film was excellent. She said Bronson "cast totally against type, is thoroughly convincing as the distraught newspaperman". Her final consensus was "the dialogue throughout is fresh, comic and memorable. For a telefilm, the production values are exceptional. Many of the exteriors in this exquisite period piece were shot in Vancouver's Gastown. Of special note is the musical score by Charles Bernstein - from ragtime to the Christmas classics it sings throughout. Turn on your VCRs Yes Virginia, There Is a Santa Claus is an instant perennial".

Susan Stewart in her review published in The Pittsburgh Press expressed liking the film. She highlighted Thomas performance as impressive and her overall impression was that it was better than most television films.

In his review published in The Cincinnati Post, Mark Lorando expressed disliking the film. He thought that Asner was over acting, and Bronson was doing the opposite, while Isabelle couldn't be taken seriously. His final consensus was "the end result is heartwarming and life-affirming and all that Christmas Jazz — but then so is reading Church's editorial which takes much less than two hours and won't keep the kids up late on a school night."

Steve Hall of The Indianapolis Star did not like it. He said "the TV movie is so relentlessly despondent that even its hopelessly saccharine ending can't save it from giving one the holiday blues".

Jon Burlingame wrote in The Times-Mail that while the concept was good the execution was poor due to being too contrived.

Michael Hill of The Evening Sun wrote "it's all done with nice sets, good actors and genuine earnestness, but Yes, Virginia, There Is a Santa Claus has that you've-seen-it-before predictability that often plagues Christmas movies".

== See also ==
- List of Christmas films
