= Yes, Virginia, there is a Santa Claus =

Phrase from 1897 editorial about Santa Claus

"Is There A Santa Claus?"
Reading by Brian Lojeck and Gesine

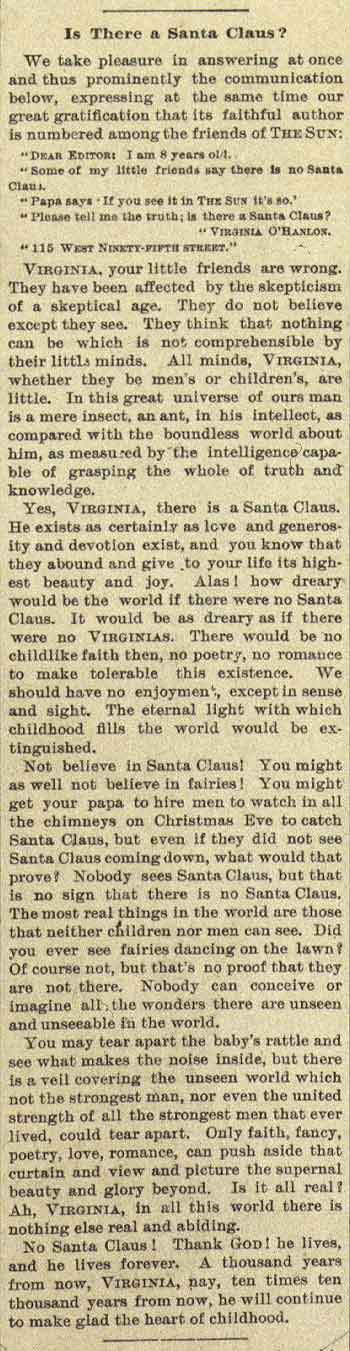
Francis Pharcellus Church's original editorial in The Sun of September 21, 1897

"Yes, Virginia, there is a Santa Claus" is a line from an editorial by Francis Pharcellus Church. Written in response to a letter by eight-year-old Virginia O'Hanlon asking whether Santa Claus was real, the editorial was first published in the New York newspaper The Sun on September 21, 1897.

"Is There a Santa Claus?" was initially published uncredited and Church's authorship was not disclosed until after his death in 1906. The editorial was quickly republished by other New York newspapers. Though initially reluctant to do the same, The Sun soon began regularly republishing the editorial during the Christmas and holiday season, including every year from 1924 to 1950, when the paper ceased publication.

The editorial is widely reprinted in the United States during the holiday season, and is the most reprinted newspaper editorial in the English language. It has been translated into around 20 languages and adapted as television specials, a film, a musical, and a cantata.

== Background ==
=== Francis Pharcellus Church ===
Francis Pharcellus Church (February 22, 1839 – April 11, 1906) was an American publisher and editor. He and his brother William Conant Church founded and edited several publications: The Army and Navy Journal (1863), The Galaxy (1866), and the Internal Revenue Record and Customs Journal (1870). Before the outbreak of the American Civil War he had worked in journalism, first at his father's New-York Chronicle and later at the New York newspaper The Sun. Church left The Sun in the early 1860s but returned to work there part-time in 1874. After The Galaxy merged with The Atlantic Monthly in 1878 he joined The Sun full-time as an editor and writer. Church wrote thousands of editorials at the paper, and became known for writing on religious topics from a secular point of view. After Church's death, his friend J. R. Duryee wrote that "by nature and training [he] was reticent about himself, highly sensitive and retiring".

=== The Sun ===
In 1897, The Sun was one of the most prominent newspapers in New York City, having been developed by its long-time editor, Charles Anderson Dana, over the previous thirty years. Their editorials that year were described by the scholar W. Joseph Campbell as favoring "vituperation and personal attack". Campbell also wrote that the management of the paper was reluctant to republish content.

== Writing and publication ==
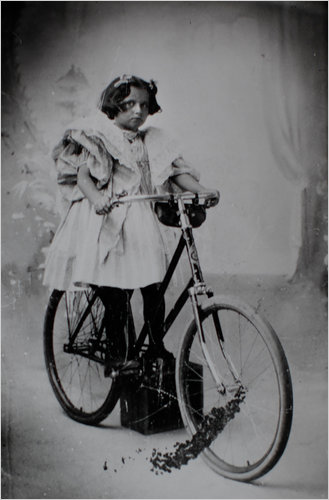
Virginia O'Hanlon (c. 1895)

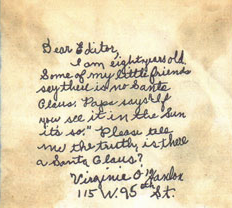
Virginia O'Hanlon's original letter

In 1897, Philip O'Hanlon, a surgeon, was asked by his eight-year-old daughter, Virginia O'Hanlon, whether Santa Claus existed. His answer did not convince her, and Virginia decided to pose the question to The Sun. Sources conflict over whether her father suggested writing the letter, or she elected to on her own. In her letter Virginia wrote that her father had told her "If you see it in The Sun it's so." O'Hanlon later told The Sun that her father thought the newspaper would be "too busy" to respond to her question and had said to "write if you want to", but not to be disappointed if she got no response. After sending the letter she looked for a response "day after day". O'Hanlon later said that she had waited for an answer to her letter for long enough that she forgot about it. Campbell theorizes the letter was sent shortly after O'Hanlon's birthday in July and was "overlooked or misplaced" for a time. (Note: A copy of the letter, hand-written by Virginia and believed by her family to be the original and returned to them by the newspaper was authenticated in 1998 by Kathleen Guzman, an appraiser on the television program Antiques Roadshow. In 2007, the show appraised its value at around $50,000. As of 2015, the letter was held by Virginia's great-granddaughter.)

The Sun's editor-in-chief, Edward Page Mitchell, eventually gave the letter to Francis Church. Mitchell reported that Church, who was initially reluctant to write a response, produced it "in a short time" during a single afternoon. Church's response was 416 words long and was anonymously published in The Sun on September 21, 1897, shortly after the beginning of the school year in New York City. The editorial appeared in the paper's third and last column of editorials that day, positioned below discussions of an election law in Connecticut, a newly invented chainless bicycle, and "British Ships in American Waters".

Church was not disclosed as the editorial's author until after his 1906 death. This sometimes led to inaccuracies: a republication in December 1897 by The Meriden Weekly Republican had attributed authorship to Dana, saying that the editorial could "hardly have been written" by any other employee of the paper. The editorial is one of two whose authorship The Sun disclosed, the other being Harold M. Anderson's "[Charles] Lindbergh Flies Alone". Campbell argued in 2006 that Church might not have welcomed The Sun's disclosure, noting that he was generally unwilling to disclose the authorship of other editorials.

=== Summary ===
The editorial, as it first appeared in The Sun, was titled "Is There a Santa Claus?" and prefaced with the text of O'Hanlon's letter asking the paper to tell her the truth about the existence of Santa Claus. O'Hanlon wrote that some of her "little friends" had told her that he was not real. (Note: Andy Rooney doubted that a young girl would refer to children her own age as "my little friends" and theorized that Virginia's father assisted her in composing the letter or even wrote it himself.) Church's response began: "Virginia, your little friends are wrong. They have been affected by the skepticism of a skeptical age." He continued to write that Santa Claus existed "as certainly as love and generosity and devotion exist" and that the world would be "dreary" if he did not. Church argued that just because something could not be seen did not mean it was not real: "Nobody can conceive or imagine all the wonders there are unseen and unseeable in the world." He concluded that:

You may tear apart the baby's rattle and see what makes the noise inside, but there is a veil covering the unseen world which not the strongest man, nor even the united strength of all the strongest men that ever lived, could tear apart. Only faith, fancy, poetry, love, romance, can push aside that curtain and view and picture the supernal beauty and glory beyond. Is it all real? Ah, VIRGINIA, in all this world there is nothing else real and abiding.
No Santa Claus! Thank God! he lives, and he lives forever. A thousand years from now, Virginia, nay, ten times ten thousand years from now, he will continue to make glad the heart of childhood.

=== Initial reception ===
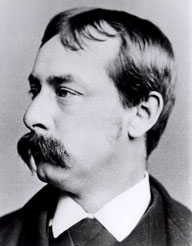
Francis Pharcellus Church, the editor who wrote the 1897 "Yes, Virginia" editorial

Virginia O'Hanlon was informed of the editorial from a friend who called her father, describing the editorial as "the most wonderful piece of writing I ever saw". She later told The Sun "I think that I have never been so happy in my life" as when she read Church's response. O'Hanlon continued to say that while she was initially very proud of her role in the editorial's publication, she eventually came to understand that "the important thing was" Church's writing. In an interview later in life she credited it with shaping the direction of her life positively.

The Sun's editor, Charles Anderson Dana, favorably received Church's editorial, deeming it "real literature". He also said that it "might be a good idea to reprint [the editorial] every Christmas—yes, and even tell who wrote it!" The editorial's publication drew no commentary from contemporary New York newspapers.

== Later republication ==
While The Sun did not republish the editorial for five years, it soon appeared in other papers. The Sun only republished the editorial after a number of reader requests. (Note: While some sources state that the editorial was republished every year after 1897, it did not appear until December 1902, with the comment that "[S]ince its original publication, the Sun has refrained from reprinting the article on Santa Claus which appeared several years ago, but this year requests for its reproduction have been so numerous that we yield.") After 1902, it did not appear in the paper again until 1906, shortly after Church's death. The paper began to re-publish the editorial more regularly after this, including six times in the ensuing ten years and, according to Campbell, gradually began to "warm to" the editorial. During this period other newspapers began to republish the editorial.

In 1918, The Sun wrote that they got many requests to "reprint again the Santa Claus editorial article" every Christmas season. The paper would also mail readers copies of the editorial upon request; it received 163,840 requests in 1930 alone and had sent 200,000 copies out by 1936. Virginia O'Hanlon also received mail about her letter until her 1971 death and would include a copy of the editorial in her replies.The Sun started reprinting the editorial annually at Christmas after 1924, when the paper's editor-in-chief, Frank Munsey, placed it as the first editorial on December 23. This practice continued on the 23rd or 24th of the month until the paper's bankruptcy in 1950.

"Is There a Santa Claus?" often appears in newspaper editorial sections during the Christmas and holiday season. It has become the most reprinted editorial in any newspaper in the English language, and has been translated into around 20 languages. Campbell describes it as living on as "enduring inspiration in American journalism." Journalist David W. Dunlap described "Yes, Virginia, there is a Santa Claus" as one of the most famous lines in American journalism, placing it after "Headless body in topless bar" and "Dewey Defeats Truman". William David Sloan, a journalism scholar, described the line as "perhaps America's most famous editorial quote" and the editorial as "the nation's best known."

== Adaptations and legacy ==
The 1921 book Is There a Santa Claus? was adapted from the editorial. The editorial became better known with the rise of mass media. The story of Virginia's inquiry and the response from The Sun was adapted in 1932 into an NBC-produced cantata, making it the only known editorial set to classical music. In the 1940s it was read yearly by actress Fay Bainter over the radio. The editorial has been adapted to film several times, including as a segment of the short film Santa Claus Story (1945).

Elizabeth Press published the 1972 children's book Yes, Virginia that illustrated the editorial and included a brief history of those involved. The fictionalized 1974 animated television special Yes, Virginia, There Is a Santa Claus aired on ABC. Animated by Bill Melendez, it won the 1975 Emmy Award for outstanding children's special.

In the 1989 drama Prancer, the letter is read and referenced multiple times, as it is the favorite piece of literature of the main character, whose belief in Santa Claus is vital to her. The 1991 live-action television film Yes, Virginia, There Is a Santa Claus starring Richard Thomas, Ed Asner, and Charles Bronson, was also based on the publication. The story was adapted into an eponymous 1996 holiday musical, with music and lyrics by David Kirchenbaum and book by Myles McDonnel.

The 2009 animated television special Yes, Virginia aired on CBS and featured actors including Neil Patrick Harris and Beatrice Miller. The special was written by the Macy's ad agency as part of their "Believe" Make-A-Wish fundraising campaign. A novelization based on the special was published the following year. Macy's later had the special adapted into a musical for students in third through sixth grade. The company gave schools the rights to perform the musical for free and awarded $1,000 grants to a hundred schools for staging the show.

The phrase "Yes, Virginia, there is (a) ..." has often been used to emphasize that "fantasies and myths are important" and can be "spiritually if not literally true".

== Analysis ==
The historian and journalist Bill Kovarik described the editorial as part of a broader "revival of the Christmas holiday" that took place during the late 19th century with the publication of various works such as Thomas Nast's art. Scholar Stephen Nissenbaum wrote that the editorial reflected popular theology of the late Victorian era and that its content echoed that of sermons on the existence of God. A 1914 editorial in The Outlook, building on The Sun, saw Santa Claus as a symbol of love, part of a child's developing image of God.

The editorial's success has been used to offer insights to writing. Upon the centenary of the editorial's publication in 1997, the journalist Eric Newton, who at the time was working at the Newseum, described the editorial as representative of the sort of "poetry" that newspapers should publish as editorials, while Geo Beach in the Editor & Publisher trade magazine described Church's writing as "brave" and showing that "love, hope, belief—all have a place on the editorial page". Beach also wrote that newspapers should not hold "anything back", as The Sun had done by publishing the editorial in September rather than in the Christmas season. In 2005, Campbell wrote that the editorial, particularly The Sun's reluctance to republish it, could offer insight into the broader state of American newspapers in the late 19th century.

Reception of the editorial has not been unanimously positive. As early as 1935, journalist Heywood Broun called the editorial a "phony piece of writing." Members of the Christian Reformed Church in North America in Lynden, Washington criticized it in 1951 for encouraging Virginia to think of her friends as liars. In 1997, the journalist Rick Horowitz wrote in the St. Louis Post-Dispatch that the editorial gave journalists an excuse to not write their own essays around Christmas: "they can just slap Francis Church's 'Yes, Virginia,' up there on the page and go straight to the office party."

== See also ==
- List of Christmas-themed literature

== Bibliography ==
- Bowler, Gerry, ed. (2000). "'Yes, Virginia, There Is a Santa Claus.'". The World Encyclopedia of Christmas. Toronto: McClelland & Stewart Limited. pp. 252–253. ISBN 978-0-7710-1531-1.
- Campbell, W. Joseph (2006). The Year That Defined American Journalism: 1897 and the Clash of Paradighms. Abingdon, Oxfordshire, UK: Routledge. doi:10.4324/9780203700495. ISBN 978-1-135-20505-8.
- Crump, William D. (2019). Happy Holidays—Animated! A Worldwide Encyclopedia of Christmas, Hanukkah, Kwanzaa and New Year's Cartoons on Television and Film. Jefferson, North Carolina: McFarland & Co. p. 349. ISBN 978-1-4766-7293-9.
- Forbes, Bruce David (October 10, 2007). Christmas: A Candid History. Oakland, California: University of California Press. doi:10.1525/9780520933729. ISBN 978-0-520-93372-9.
- Hirsch, Eric Donald; Kett, Joseph F.; Trefil, James S. (2002). The New Dictionary of Cultural Literacy. Boston: Houghton Mifflin Harcourt. ISBN 978-0-618-22647-4.
- Kovarik, Bill (2015). Revolutions in Communication: Media History from Gutenberg to the Digital Age. New York: Bloomsbury Publishing USA. ISBN 978-1-62892-479-4.
- Lovinger, Paul W. (2000). The Penguin Dictionary of American English Usage and Style. New York: Penguin Reference. ISBN 978-0-670-89166-5.
- Nissenbaum, Stephen (1997). The Battle For Christmas. New York: Vintage Books. p. 88. ISBN 978-0-679-74038-4.
- Rooney, Andy (2007). Common Nonsense. New York: PublicAffairs. ISBN 978-1-58648-617-4.
- Turner, Hy B. (1999). When Giants Ruled: The Story of Park Row, New York's Great Newspaper Street. New York: Fordham University Press. pp. 129–130. ISBN 978-0-8232-1943-8.
- Woolery, George W. (1989). Animated TV Specials: The Complete Directory to the First Twenty-Five Years, 1962–1987. Lanham, Maryland: Scarecrow Press. pp. 463–464. ISBN 978-0-8108-2198-9.
