= Madame de Mauves =

1874 novella by Henry James

- Author: Henry James
- Language: English
- Genre: Novella
- Publisher: The Galaxy
- Publication date: February–March 1874
- Publication place: United States
- Media type: Print
- Pages: 37

Madame de Mauves is a novella by Henry James, originally published in The Galaxy magazine in 1874. The story centers on the troubled marriage of a scrupulous American wife and a far from scrupulous French husband, and is told mostly from the point of view of a male friend of the wife. The tale reflects the intense interest James took in the "international theme," especially early in his career. One of the longest fictions he had yet attempted, the smoothly narrated story shows that James was rapidly maturing in style and technique.

== Plot summary ==
A wealthy American man named Longmore is introduced to his countrywoman Euphemia de Mauves, wife of the Comte Richard de Mauves. Longmore and Madame de Mauves become friends, and he visits her frequently in Paris. Superficially, Madam de Mauves leads a happy life with a wealthy and "irreproachably polite" husband, but Longmore soon becomes convinced that she harbours a deep sadness. It gradually becomes clear that the Comte is an unscrupulous and dissipated man who married his wife for her money alone. As a youth, Madame de Mauves had been naive and idealistic, believing that the Comte de Mauves' title guaranteed a fine character. The Comte, however, proved to have little regard for his wife, and had embarked on a series of extramarital affairs. Even his politeness "was hardly more than a form of luxurious egotism, like his fondness for cambric handkerchiefs.... In after years he was terribly polite to his wife." Madame de Mauves' faith in her ideals is destroyed, but she responds with stoic resignation.

Longmore falls in love with Madame de Mauves, but, understanding that he cannot be her lover, and believing that she desperately needs a friend, he tries to sublimate his love into friendship. This attitude is reinforced by Madame de Mauves, who welcomes his friendship, but is hostile to any sentiment on his part. However both the Comte de Mauves and his sister, the crass widow Madame de Clairin, hint that Longmore should woo Madame de Mauves. The Comte wishes her to take a lover so that he may be free to pursue his own affair.

As tensions mount, the Comte openly breaks with his wife, Madame de Clairin urges Longmore to woo Madame de Mauves, and then she tells Madame de Mauves what she has told Longmore. Longmore agonises over how to proceed; he finds it difficult even to decide to continue his daily visits: "His presence now might be simply a gratuitous cause of suffering; and yet his absence might seem to imply that it was in the power of circumstances to make them ashamed to meet each other's eyes." Eventually he visits Madame de Mauves, who rather cryptically asks him to confirm her very high opinion of him by doing the proper thing: "Don't disappoint me. If you don't understand me now, you will to-morrow, or very soon. When I said just now that I had a very high opinion of you, I meant it very seriously. It was not a vain compliment. I believe that there is no appeal one may make to your generosity which can remain long unanswered. If this were to happen,—if I were to find you selfish where I thought you generous, narrow where I thought you large, ... vulgar where I thought you rare,—I should think worse of human nature. I should suffer,—I should suffer keenly. I should say to myself in the dull days of the future, 'There was one man who might have done so and so; and he, too, failed.' But this shall not be. You have made too good an impression on me not to make the very best. If you wish to please me forever, there's a way."

After much reflection, Longmore concludes that she wishes him to voluntarily break off contact — to do so not because she has dismissed him, not because there has been a 'scene', and not with any promise of meeting again in future, but simply because it is the honourable thing to do. The next day Longmore leaves for America. At his last meeting with the Comte he receives the impression that the Comte may be starting to repent of his behaviour; Longmore feels threatened by this: "he felt that it would be far more tolerable in the future to think of his continued turpitude than of his repentance."

Longmore remains in love with Madame de Mauves, despite having had no contact with her. Two years later, he hears that the Comte has committed suicide. The Comte had indeed repented, and had begged his wife to forgive him, but Madame de Mauves had remained as stoically unforgiving as she had been stoic in her resignation: "[H]e fell madly in love with her now. He was the proudest man in France, but he had begged her on his knees to be readmitted to favor. All in vain! She was stone, she was ice, she was outraged virtue. People noticed a great change in him: he gave up society, ceased to care for anything, looked shockingly. One fine day they learned that he had blown out his brains."

Euphemia is now free, and Longmore's first instinct is to go to her. However he puts off leaving for Europe from day to day for several years, because "The truth is, that in the midst of all the ardent tenderness of his memory of Madame de Mauves, he has become conscious of a singular feeling,—a feeling for which awe would be hardly too strong a name."

== Themes ==
In this story James' international theme takes a tragic and even perverse turn, as the marriage of a somewhat puritanical American woman and an easy-living, pagan Frenchman leads to despair and suicide. Whether an affair between Longmore and Euphemia (suggested by the amoral Richard and his equally cynical sister Madame de Clairin) would have made any difference is doubtful, but things couldn't have turned out much worse under any circumstances.

Longmore is somewhat typical of James' male protagonists, hesitant about taking action and entering fully into life. Even at the end of the story he can't decide whether to return to Euphemia. This paralysis of the will affects many of James' central characters, but Longmore is extreme even by Jamesian standards in his uncertainty and indecision.

The final lesson seems to be that American idealism and European sophistication can make for a dangerous, even lethal mixture. James would write many more fictions about the clash of America and Europe, leading to the ultimate synthesis in The Golden Bowl. In that much later novel, a marriage similar to the one in Madame de Mauves is saved by the kind of careful diplomacy that neither spouse in the earlier story is capable of.

== Critical evaluation ==
Much critical dispute has arisen over Richard's suicide after Euphemia's refusal to reconcile with him. Some commentators find it frankly incredible that his wife's rebuff would drive Richard to self-destruction. Others maintain that such a man could easily sicken of life and decide to end it all, but have doubted that he could ever have repented and asked Euphemia's forgiveness in the first place.

Although the believability of the story's conclusion is somewhat in doubt, many critics agree that James narrates the tale in a more assured and masterful manner than he had demonstrated in any of his previous fictions. James' decade-long apprenticeship in short narrative was starting to pay off, and he would soon begin his productive career in the full-length novel.
