= Francis Pharcellus Church =

American publisher and editor (1839–1906)

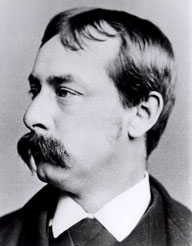
- Born: February 22, 1839; Rochester, New York, US
- Died: April 11, 1906 (aged 67); New York City, US
- Education: Columbia University (BA, MA)
- Occupations: Publisher, editor
- Spouse: Elizabeth Wickham (m. 1871)
- Relatives: William Conant Church (brother)

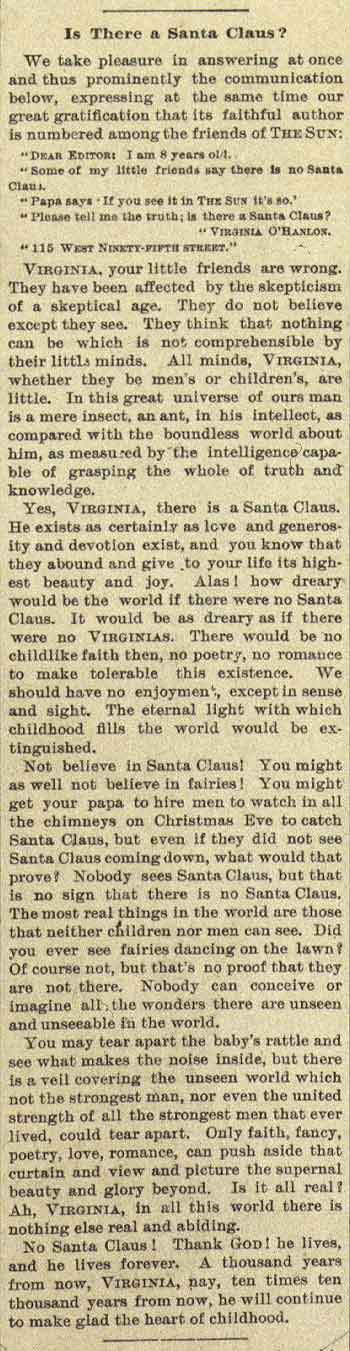
Church's Sun editorial of September 21, 1897, "Yes, Virginia, there is a Santa Claus

Francis Pharcellus Church (February 22, 1839 – April 11, 1906) was an American publisher and editor. In 1897, Church wrote the editorial "Yes, Virginia, there is a Santa Claus". Produced in response to eight-year-old Virginia O'Hanlon's letter asking whether Santa Claus was real, the widely republished editorial has become one of the most famous ever written.

Born in Rochester, New York, Church graduated from Columbia University and embarked on a career in journalism. With his brother, William Conant Church, Francis founded and edited several periodicals including The Army and Navy Journal, The Galaxy, and the Internal Revenue Record and Customs Journal. He was a war correspondent for The New York Times during the American Civil War. He worked at The Sun in the early 1860s and again from 1874 until his death, writing thousands of editorials.

Church died in New York City and was buried at Sleepy Hollow Cemetery.

== Early life and education ==
Francis "Frank" Pharcellus Church was born in Rochester on February 22, 1839, to Pharcellus Church, a Baptist minister, and Chara Emily Church (née Conant). He had three sisters; an older brother, William Conant Church; and a younger brother, John Adams Church. As a child, Francis looked up to William "as his 'big brother' and was his 'admiring satellite'." In 1848, the family moved to Boston, where Pharcellus preached at Bowdoin Square Baptist Church and edited the Watchman and Reflector, a weekly Baptist newspaper. In 1852, Pharcellus' health failed; he resigned his pastorship and moved the family to Chara's home in Vermont. The following year, the family moved a final time, to Brooklyn. Francis began to attend Manhattan's Columbia Grammar & Preparatory School, whose headmaster was Charles Anthon. His education was centered around math and foreign languages.

Francis Church matriculated at Columbia College in New York City, where he graduated with honors in 1859. He earned a Master of Arts two years later. Although Church had entered university studying law and divinity, and spent a time studying under the judge Hooper C. Van Vorst, he soon switched his focus completely to writing and had graduated Columbia studying journalism.

== Writing and publishing career ==
After graduation, Church found work at The New York Chronicle, which was published by his father and brother. For a time after William left to work at The Sun, Francis Church was the chief assistant at the Chronicle, but he eventually left to work at The Sun as well. In 1862, he covered the American Civil War for The New York Times.

In 1863, Church, his brother William, and others established The Army and Navy Journal to promote loyalty to the Union during the Civil War and report on military affairs. During the war, Church worked for the Journal as a war correspondent, and from 1863 to 1865, he was an editor and publisher of the Journal. He remained co-publisher until 1874.

In 1866, the brothers founded the Galaxy literary magazine as a competitor to The Atlantic Monthly; Church was a publisher for two years and an editor there until 1872 or 1878. The Dictionary of Literary Biography credits Francis with doing "most of the editorial work." As editors, the brothers became known for their heavy-handed style, for instance cutting major parts of Rebecca Harding Davis's Waiting for the Verdict when they serialized it. Supported by literary figures, notably Edmund Clarence Stedman, the brothers worked to attract the best authors possible to their publication, though they focused on New York authors and largely ignored the well-established literary society in New England. Stedman, while speaking about the editors in 1903, stated that the magazine focused on featuring authors from across the United States and did not focus on publishing works from popular authors.

They published the magazine fortnightly for a year, then switched to a monthly format. In 1870, Church proposed that Mark Twain contribute a "Memoranda" column in the magazine, a request Twain accepted; he edited the column from May 1870 to March 1871. Altogether, the magazine published the work of more than 600 authors, including Rebecca Harding Davis, Henry James, John William De Forest, Rose Terry Cooke, John Esten Cooke, and Constance Fenimore Woolson. The magazine's circulation peaked around 21,000 in 1871 and fell dramatically afterwards. The Galaxy merged with the Atlantic Monthly in 1878.

Church also managed the Internal Revenue Record and Customs Journal with his brother from 1870 to 1895. He was re-hired as a part-time editor and writer at The Sun in 1874. He started working full-time there after leaving The Galaxy. In this capacity, Church published thousands of editorials, most of which attracted little note. One of his more popular editorials was in response to a maid asking about etiquette, after which Church wrote a series of additional replies to letters asking for advice. He continued to work for The Sun until his death in 1906.

Edward Page Mitchell, The Sun's editor-in-chief, later said Church had "a knowledge of journalistic history and an insight into journalistic character that could hardly be expected of any but a major figure in the profession." Mitchell also considered Church "energetic and a brilliant conversationalist." An obituary published in The New York Times described Church as not being well known among literary circles because his reputation had been "merged" with that of The Sun, but among those who knew him he was "highly and justly esteemed." It said his editorial style specialized in treating theological topics "from a secular point of view." He disliked politics.

=== "Yes, Virginia" ===
In 1897, Mitchell gave Church a letter written to The Sun by eight-year-old Virginia O'Hanlon, who wanted to know whether there truly is a Santa Claus. In Church's 416-word response, he wrote that Santa exists "as certainly as love and generosity and devotion exist". "Yes, Virginia, there is a Santa Claus" became Church's best-known work and the most reprinted editorial in newspaper history.

Mitchell reported that Church, who was initially reluctant to write a response, produced it "in a short time" during an afternoon. Upon publication on September 21, 1897, journalist Charles Anderson Dana described Church's writing as "Real literature," and said, "Might be a good idea to reprint it every Christmas—yes, and even tell who wrote it!"

The editorial was first reprinted five years later to answer readers' demand for it. The Sun started reprinting the editorial annually in 1920 at Christmas, and continued until the paper's bankruptcy in 1950. Because The Sun traditionally did not byline their editorials, Church was not known to be the author until his death in 1906. The editorial is just one of two whose authorship The Sun disclosed.

The editorial, which has been described as "the most famous editorial in history", has been translated into 20 languages, set to music, and adapted into at least two movies. A book based on the editorial, Is there a Santa Claus?, was published in 1921.

== Personal life and death ==
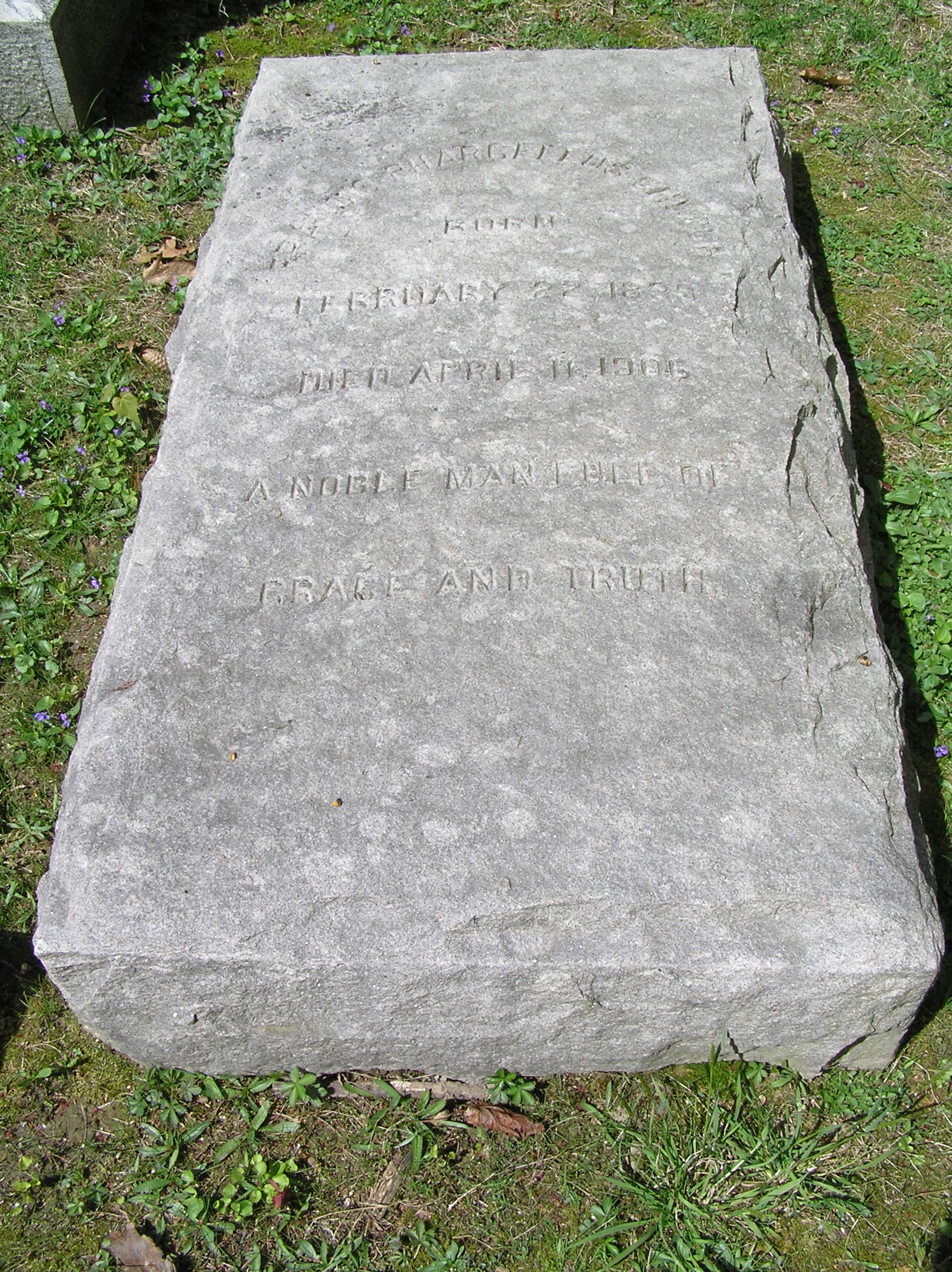
The monument of Francis Pharcellus Church in Sleepy Hollow Cemetery

In 1871, he married Elizabeth Wickham, who was from Philadelphia. In 1882 or 1883, Church moved from 107 East 35th Street to the Florence Apartment House, located at East 18th Street and East Union Place (now known as Park Avenue South). He and his wife lived there until 1890. They had no children.

He was a member of the Sons of the Revolution, the National Sculpture Society, and the Century Association.

Church died in New York City on April 11, 1906, at the age of 67, at his home on 46 East 30th Street. He had an unknown illness for several months before his death. He was buried in Sleepy Hollow Cemetery in Sleepy Hollow, New York.
