= Hooper C. Van Vorst =

American judge (1817–1889)

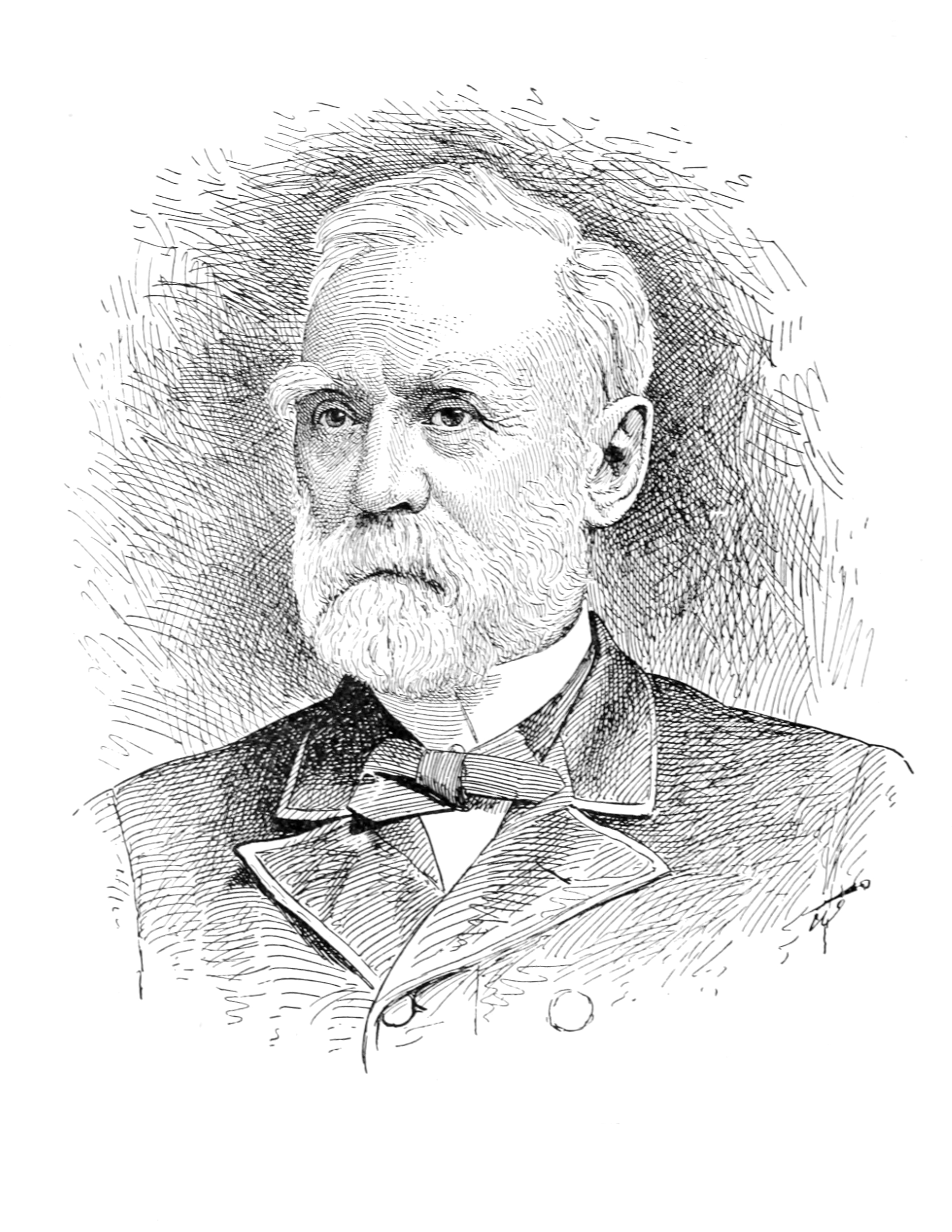

10th judge New York Court of Common Pleas
- In office 1868–1869
- Nominated by: Gov. Reuben Fenton

Superior Court of the City of New York
- In office 1871–1885

Personal details
- Born: December 3, 1817 Schenectady, New York
- Died: October 26, 1889 (aged 71) New York City
- Party: Republican
- Education: Union College

Hooper Cummings Van Vorst (1817–1889) was a judge in the New York City court system.

Van Vorst was born on December 3, 1817, in Schenectady, New York, to parents of Dutch extraction. He graduated from Union College in 1839.

In 1868, he was appointed to the New York Court of Common Pleas.

In 1871, he was appointed to a 14-year term as a judge on the Superior Court of the City of New York.

Van Vorst died in New York City on October 26, 1889.
