= Virginia O'Hanlon =

American teacher (1889–1971)

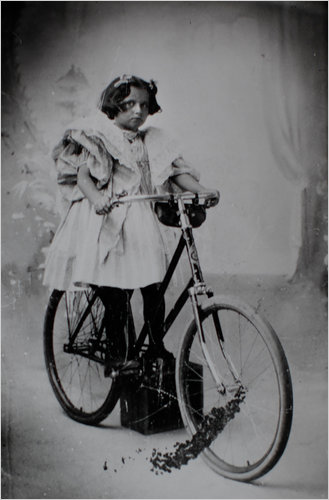
Virginia O'Hanlon (circa 1895)

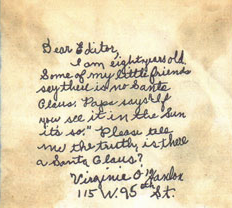
O'Hanlon's original 1897 letter

Laura Virginia O'Hanlon Douglas (July 20, 1889 – May 13, 1971) was an American educator best known for writing a letter as a child to the New York newspaper The Sun that inspired the 1897 editorial "Is There a Santa Claus?". The editorial, by Francis Pharcellus Church, contains the line "Yes, Virginia, there is a Santa Claus", and brought attention to O'Hanlon for the rest of her life. Historian Gerald Bowler called it "the most famous editorial in history."

== Early life ==
Laura Virginia O'Hanlon was born on July 20, 1889, in New York City, to Philip F. O'Hanlon, a surgeon who worked in a consulting capacity for the New York City Police Department, and Laura Virginia O'Hanlon née Plumb.

== "Is There a Santa Claus?" ==
In 1897, Virginia asked her father whether Santa Claus existed. His answer did not convince her, and she decided to pose the question to the New York newspaper The Sun. Sources conflict over whether her father suggested writing the letter or she elected to on her own. In her letter, Virginia wrote that her father had told her, "If you see it in The Sun it's so." O'Hanlon later told The Sun that her father thought the newspaper would be "too busy" to respond to her question and had said, "Write if you want to," but not to be disappointed if she did not get a response.

After sending the letter, she looked for, but did not expect, a response "[d]ay after day." O'Hanlon later said that she had waited for an answer to her letter for so long that she forgot about it. The response appeared in The Sun on September 21, 1897, as an anonymously published editorial, titled "Is There a Santa Claus?" The editorial, which was later revealed to have been written by Francis Pharcellus Church, became known especially for the line "Yes, Virginia, There is a Santa Claus." Described by Christmas historian Gerald Bowler as "the most famous editorial in history", it has been translated into 20 languages, set to music, and adapted into at least two movies.

O'Hanlon was informed of the editorial from a friend who called her father, describing the editorial as "the most wonderful piece of writing I ever saw." She later told The Sun "I think that I have never been so happy in my life" as when she read Church's response. O'Hanlon continued to say that while she was initially very proud of her role in the editorial's publication, she eventually came to understand that "the important thing was" Church's writing.

== Later life ==
O'Hanlon's involvement with the editorial continued to impact her through the rest of her life. In an interview later in life she credited it with shaping the direction of her life positively. O'Hanlon received mail about her letter throughout her life, particularly during the Christmas and holiday season, and would include a copy of the editorial in her replies. She also occasionally read the editorial as part of Christmas celebrations and spoke about it on request—for instance, delivering a lecture at Hunter College in 1933.

Around the Christmas season she was sometimes contacted by reporters asking for a brief comment on the editorial. O'Hanlon later told reporters when asked if she still believed in Santa Claus that "the verities of the editorial are just as true as they ever were." She once remarked on the cyclical nature of her popularity: "I am anonymous from January to November."

=== Career ===
O'Hanlon received a Bachelor of Arts from the Normal College of the City of New York in 1910 and a master's degree in education from Columbia University in 1911. She taught elementary school in the New York City public school system starting in 1912.

O'Hanlon was living with her parents by 1920. In 1930, she earned a doctorate in education from Fordham University; the title of her dissertation was "The Importance of Play". She continued to work in the New York City school system and was promoted to the role of junior principal in 1935, working at schools including PS Manhattan 31 and P.S. 401, and retired in 1959.

=== Personal life, death and legacy ===
O'Hanlon lived at 115 West 95th Street, where she had lived as a child, for most of her life. She married Edward Douglas in the mid-1910s. The couple's child, Laura Virginia, was born in 1915. Edward either died or deserted O'Hanlon shortly before their child was born. She kept her ex-husband's surname the rest of her life, styling herself as "Laura Virginia O'Hanlon Douglas."

After retiring in 1959, Douglas moved to North Chatham, New York, a small village near Albany, New York. Douglas died on May 13, 1971, at the age of 81, in a nursing home in Valatie, New York. She is buried at the Chatham Rural Cemetery in North Chatham.

A copy of the letter, hand-written by Virginia and believed by her family to be the original and returned to them by the newspaper, was authenticated in 1998 by Kathleen Guzman, an appraiser on the television program Antiques Roadshow. In 2007, the show appraised its value at around $50,000. As of 2015, the letter was held by Virginia's great-granddaughter.

As of 1997 there was a statue of Santa Claus in Valatie with a plaque dedicated to O'Hanlon. In 2009, the Virginia O'Hanlon Scholarship Fund was established at the Studio School, a private school that occupies O'Hanlon's childhood home. The school also added a commemorative plaque on the building.
