= The Examiner and Chronicle =

Baptist newspaper

The Examiner and Chronicle was a Baptist newspaper published in the United States from 1865 to 1913 under various names. It was consolidated from several other publications. At its peak, the paper was the largest Baptist publication by circulation.

== History ==
=== Predecessor publications ===
The Baptist Advocate was founded in New York City by a group of Baptists. It first published an issue on May 11, 1839. William H. Wyckoff edited the paper, which purchased the Gospel Witness six months later. Although with that purchase the Advocate had eliminated all competition, it was financially unsuccessful and the owners were forced to sell to James L. Thompson and a Mr. Wyckoff in 1842. S. S. Cutting edited the paper from 1844. The Advocate changed its name to The New York Recorder before it was sold to Lewis Colby and Joseph Ballard. Colby and Ballard in turn sold the paper to the educator Martin Brewer Anderson and James S. Dickerson in February 1850. Anderson sold the paper when he became president of the University of Rochester three years later, to L. F. Beecher. Ownership later passed to Andrew Ten Brook, who renamed the paper The New York Recorder and Register, absorbing The New York Baptist which had been formed in 1823 in Utica, New York.

The New York Chronicle was established either in 1840 or in 1849 by O. B. Judd as a monthly paper. Shortly the next year it switched to a weekly format. The paper was known for its support of the American Bible Society. It was purchased about three years later by J. S. Backus and by 1856 Pharcellus Church had bought the paper from Backus. Church combined the Chronicle with Philadelphia's Christian Chronicle in 1863.

=== Formation and history ===
Edward Bright and Sewell S. Cutting purchased The New York Recorder and Register. He renamed the publication The Examiner. At this point, it had a circulation of approximately 10,000. Cutting left the publication to accept a job at the University of Rochester, while Bright remained as editor. He oversaw a doubling of circulation in the first ten years, a which point The New York Chronicle was merged and the paper adopted its final name of The Examiner and Chronicle. In 1867 it expanded to six columns and eight pages, and two years later to seven columns. The paper absorbed The Christian Press in 1868 and The Outlook in 1875. Henry Clay Vedder, a prominent Baptist journalist, joined the paper's staff in 1876 as an editorial writer.

The New York Times profiled the paper in 1880 as "A Vigorous Baptist Paper", praising the efforts of Bright and describing it as "the organ" of the Baptists, noting that "it is wielded for good in every community where a Baptist church is to be found." Contributors to the paper included Francis Wayland, the president of Brown University. In 1883 the paper was described as having "the largest circulation of any Baptist newspaper in the world." By 1887 it had reverted to being known as simply The Examiner again. Bright died in 1894 and the paper continued to expand, purchasing The National Baptist that year, at which point H. L. Wayland joined its staff, and the following year The Christian Inquirer. In 1913 Publishers Weekly reported that the paper would be merged with The Watchman, a Bostonian Baptist publication.

In 1919 it was described as having been "the foremost force in American Baptist journalism."
