= The Sun (New York City) =

American daily newspaper (1833–1950)

- It Shines for All
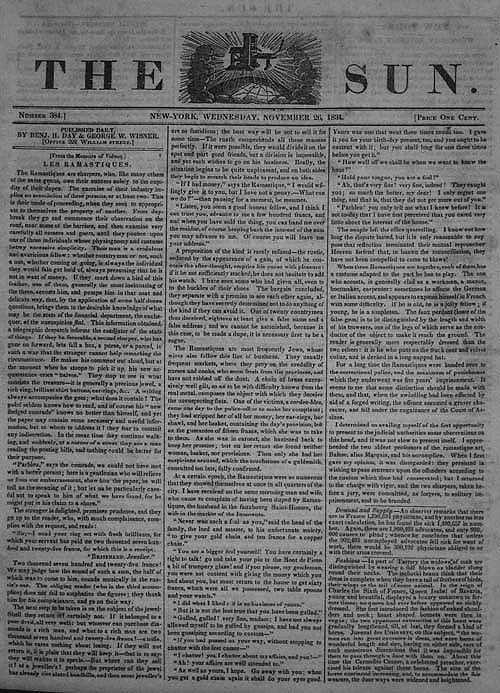
- The November 26, 1834, front page of The Sun
- Type: Daily newspaper
- Format: Tabloid
- Owner(s): Moses Yale (1835); Frank Munsey (1916)
- Editor: Benjamin Day (1833)
- Founded: 1833; 193 years ago
- Ceased publication: January 4, 1950
- Relaunched: The New York Sun (2002)
- Headquarters: Sun Building, Park Row; 150 Nassau Street; The Sun Building

The Sun was a New York newspaper published from 1833 until 1950. It was considered a serious paper, like the city's two more successful broadsheets, The New York Times and the New York Herald Tribune. The Sun was the first successful penny daily newspaper in the United States, and was for a time the most successful newspaper in the United States of America.

The paper was the first to hire reporters to go out and collect stories. Prior to this, newspapers dealt almost exclusively in articles about politics or reviews of books or the theater and, in the days before the organization of syndicates such as the Associated Press (AP) and United Press International (UPI), relied on items sent in by readers and unauthorized copies of stories from other newspapers. The Sun's focus on crime was the beginning of "the craft of reporting and storytelling". The paper had a central focus on crime news, in which it was a pioneer, and was the first journal to hire a police reporter. Its audience was primarily working class readers.

The Sun is well-known for publishing the Great Moon Hoax of 1835, as well as Francis Pharcellus Church's 1897 editorial containing the line "Yes, Virginia, there is a Santa Claus".

It merged with the New York World-Telegram in 1950.

== History ==
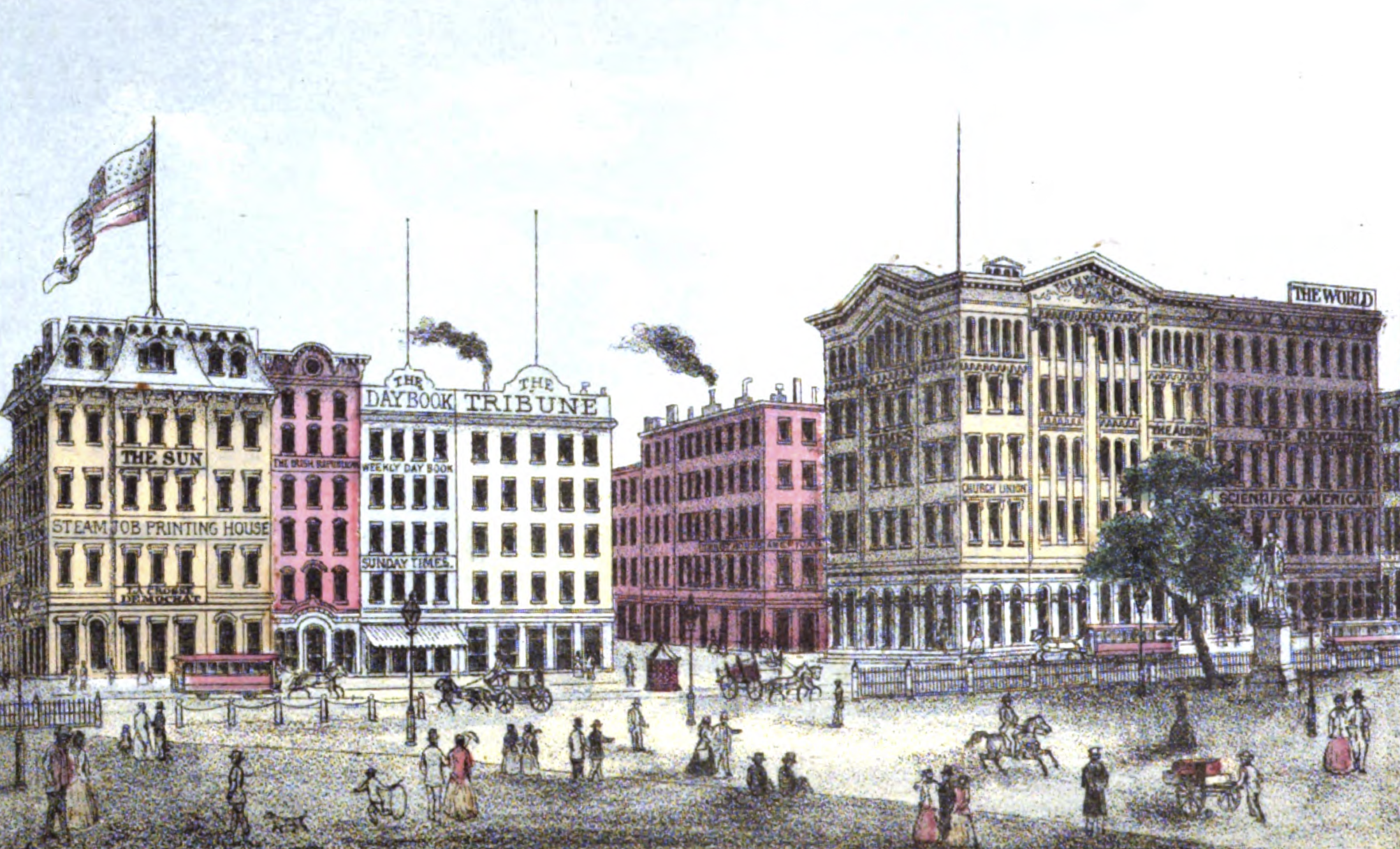
The Sun's new office on Printing House Square in the 1860s

The Sun began publication in New York on September 3, 1833, as a morning newspaper edited by Benjamin Day (1810–1889), with the slogan "It Shines for All". It cost only one penny (equivalent to 33¢ in 2025), was easy to carry, and had illustrations and crime reporting popular with working-class readers.

It inspired a new genre across the nation, known as the penny press, which made the news more accessible to low-income readers at a time when most papers cost five cents. The Sun was also the first newspaper to hire newspaper hawkers to sell it on the street, developing the trade of newsboys shouting headlines.

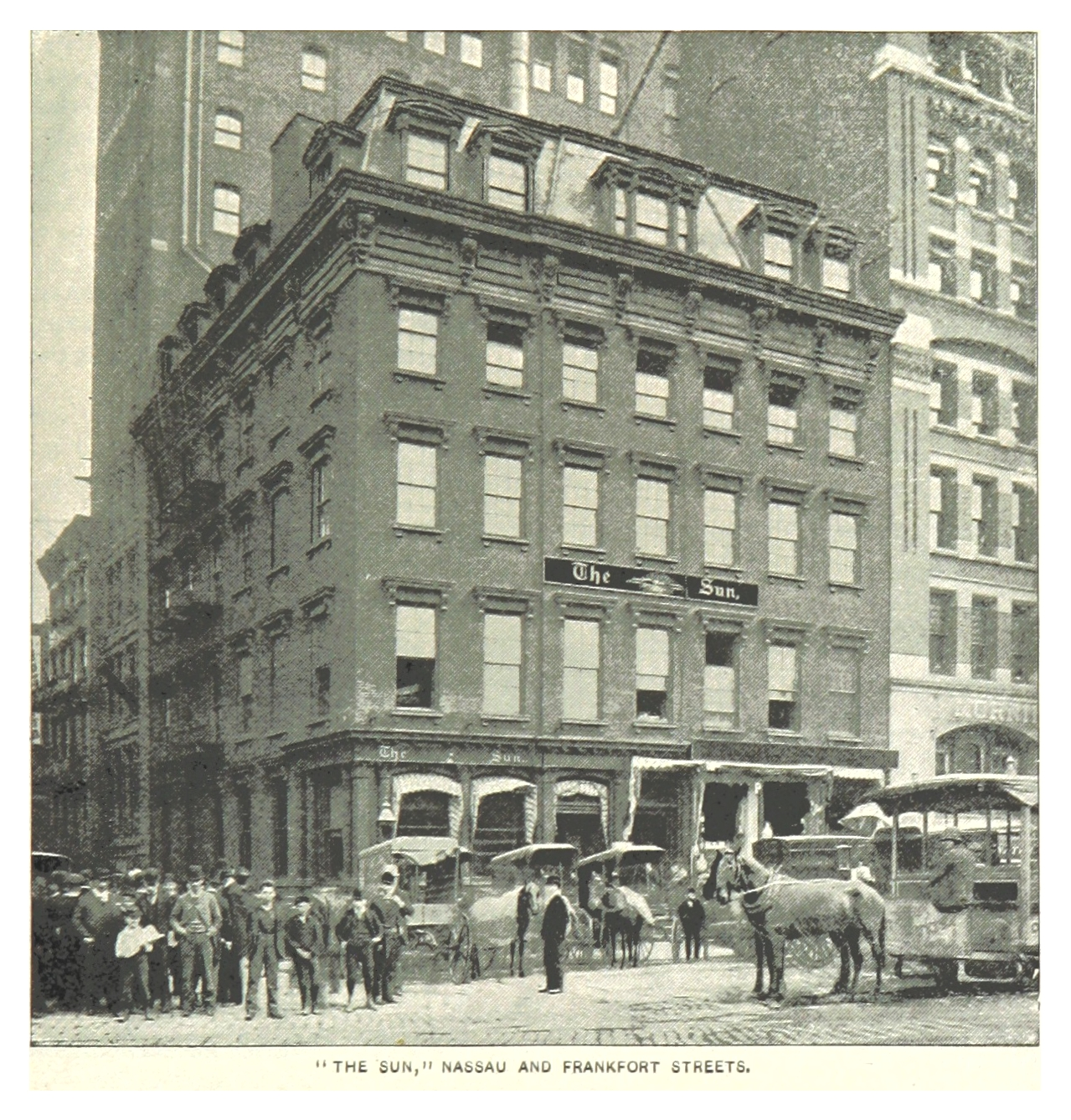
The offices of The Sun, 1893

The Sun was the first newspaper to report crimes and personal events such as suicides, deaths, and divorces. The paper had a focus on police reports and human-interest stories for the masses, which consisted of short descriptions of arrests, thefts, and violence. With their competitor the New York Herald, founded by James Gordon Bennett, they covered murder cases such as Helen Jewett's murder, the murder of John C. Colt, Samuel Colt's brother, and Mary Rogers's case near Sybil's Cave. The Sun and The Herald took sides in these cases, championing working class people over the traditional landed and mercantile elites which, during this era, held disproportionate power over the nation's politics and economy.

Benjamin Day's brother-in-law, Moses Yale Beach, joined the venture in 1834, became co-owner in 1835, and a few years later, became sole proprietor, bringing a number of innovations to the industry. It became the largest among the Gotham papers for 20 years, sometimes eclipsed by the New-York Tribune or the New York Herald.

The newspaper printed the first newspaper account of a suicide. This story was significant because it was the first about the death of an ordinary person. It changed journalism forever, making the newspaper an integral part of the community and the lives of the readers.

Day was the first to hire reporters to go out and collect stories. Prior to this, newspapers dealt almost exclusively in articles about politics or reviews of books or the theater and relied, in the days before the organization of syndicates such as the Associated Press (AP) and United Press International (UPI), on items sent in by readers and unauthorized copies of stories from other newspapers. The Sun's focus on crime was the beginning of "the craft of reporting and storytelling".

Crime news provided New Yorkers with information about how the city worked, dwelling on violations of justice, abuse of state power and corrupt schemes.

The Sun was also the first newspaper to show that a newspaper could be substantially supported by advertisements rather than subscription fees, and could be sold on the street instead of delivered to each subscriber. Prior to The Sun, printers produced newspapers, often at a loss, making their living selling printing services. Day and The Sun recognized that the masses were fast becoming literate, and demonstrated that a profit could be made selling to them.

The offices of The Sun were initially located on Printing House Square, now called Park Row, Manhattan, and was next to New York City Hall and New York City Police Department. It had a pigeon house built on the roof of its New York office at Nassau Street, receiving news from New York Harbor. They also later used horses, steamships, trains, and the telegraph, the Pony Express and Royal Mail Ships.

=== Later history ===
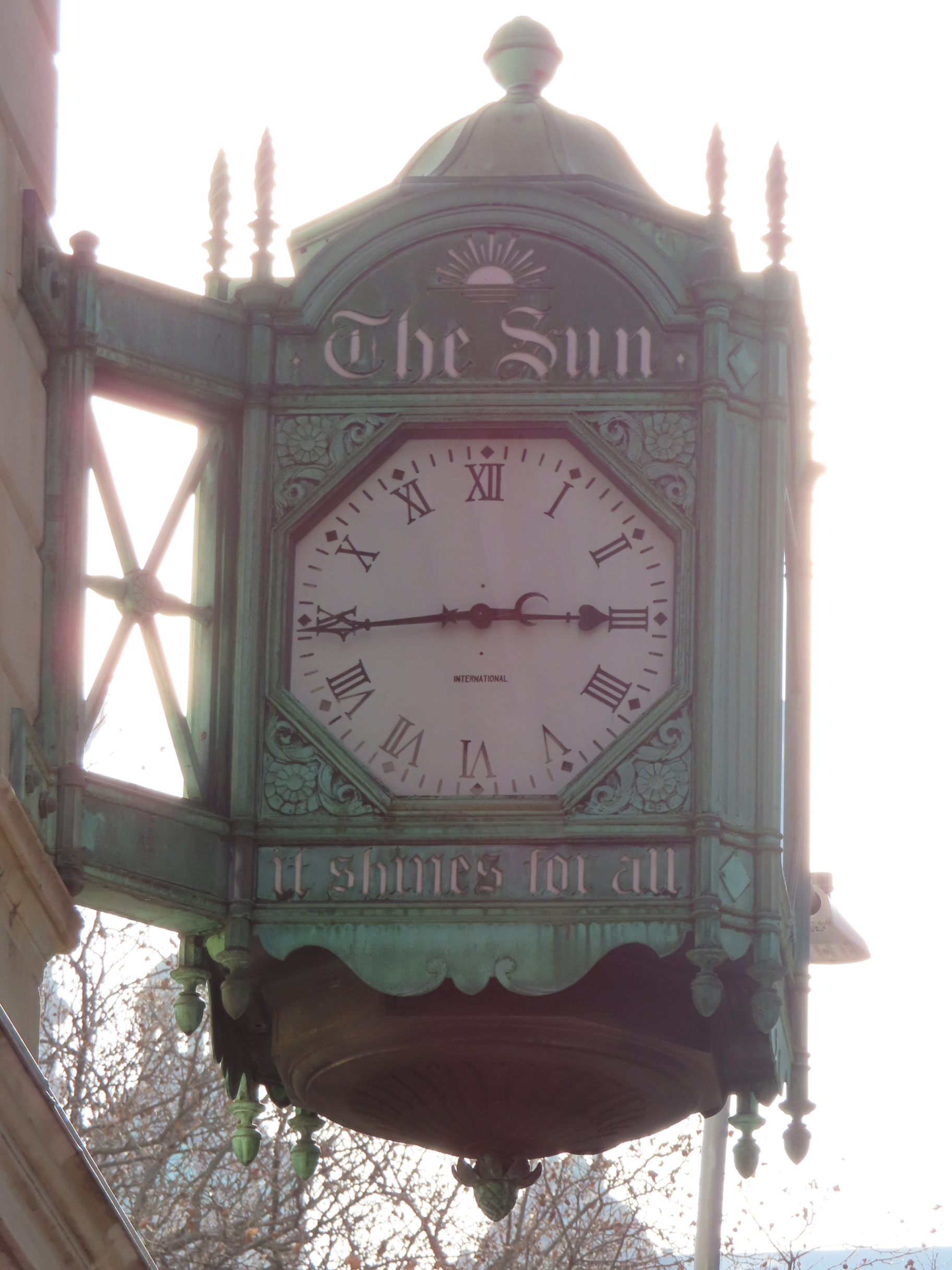
The clock of the "Sun Building" on Broadway, Manhattan, near Chambers Streets

Moses Yale Beach's sons, Alfred Ely Beach and Moses S. Beach, took over the paper following his retirement. He celebrated the event at his house on Chambers Street, along with the other editors of Gotham, with guests including Congressmen Horace Greeley and James Brooks, and Abraham Lincoln's Chairman Henry Jarvis Raymond.

In 1868, Moses S. Beach sold the newspaper to Charles A. Dana, the Assistant Secretary of War of Abraham Lincoln, and stayed a stockholder. In 1872 The Sun exposed the Crédit Mobilier Scandal, implicating a number of corrupt Congressmen and Vice President Schuyler Colfax in a corrupt scheme involving the construction of the Union Pacific Railroad, and in 1881 exposed the Star Route Scandal, implicating a number of high-profile politicians and businessmen in a scheme relating to the US Postal Service, resulting in number of trials and increasing public support for civil service reform.

An evening edition, known as The Evening Sun, was introduced in 1887. The newspaper magnate Frank Munsey bought both editions of the paper in 1916 and merged The Evening Sun with his New York Press. The morning edition of The Sun was merged for a time with Munsey's New York Herald as The Sun and New York Herald, but in 1920, Munsey separated them again, killed The Evening Sun, and switched The Sun to an evening publishing format.

From 1914 to 1919, The Sun moved its offices to 150 Nassau Street, one of the first skyscrapers made of steel, and one of the tallest in the city at the time. The tower was close to the New York Times Building, Woolworth Tower, and New York City Hall. In 1919, The Sun moved its offices to the A.T. Stewart Company Building, site of America's first department store, at 280 Broadway between Reade and Chambers Streets. 280 Broadway was renamed "The Sun Building" in 1928. A clock featuring The Sun's name and slogan was built at the corner with Broadway and Chambers Street.

Munsey died in 1925 with a fortune of about 20 million dollars, and was ranked as one of the most powerful media moguls of his time, along with William Randolph Hearst. He left the bulk of his estate, including The Sun, to the Metropolitan Museum of Art. The next year The Sun was sold to William Dewart, a longtime associate of Munsey's. Dewart's son Thomas later ran the paper.

In the 1940s, the newspaper was considered among the most conservative in New York City and was strongly opposed to the New Deal and labor unions. The Sun won a Pulitzer Prize in 1949 for an exposé of labor racketeering; it also published the early work of sportswriter W.C. Heinz.

It continued until January 4, 1950, when it merged with the New York World-Telegram to form a new paper called the New York World-Telegram and Sun. That paper continued for 16 years; in 1966, it joined with the New York Herald Tribune to briefly become part of the World Journal Tribune, preserving the names of three of the most historic city newspapers, which folded amid disputes with the unions representing its staff the following year.

== Milestones ==
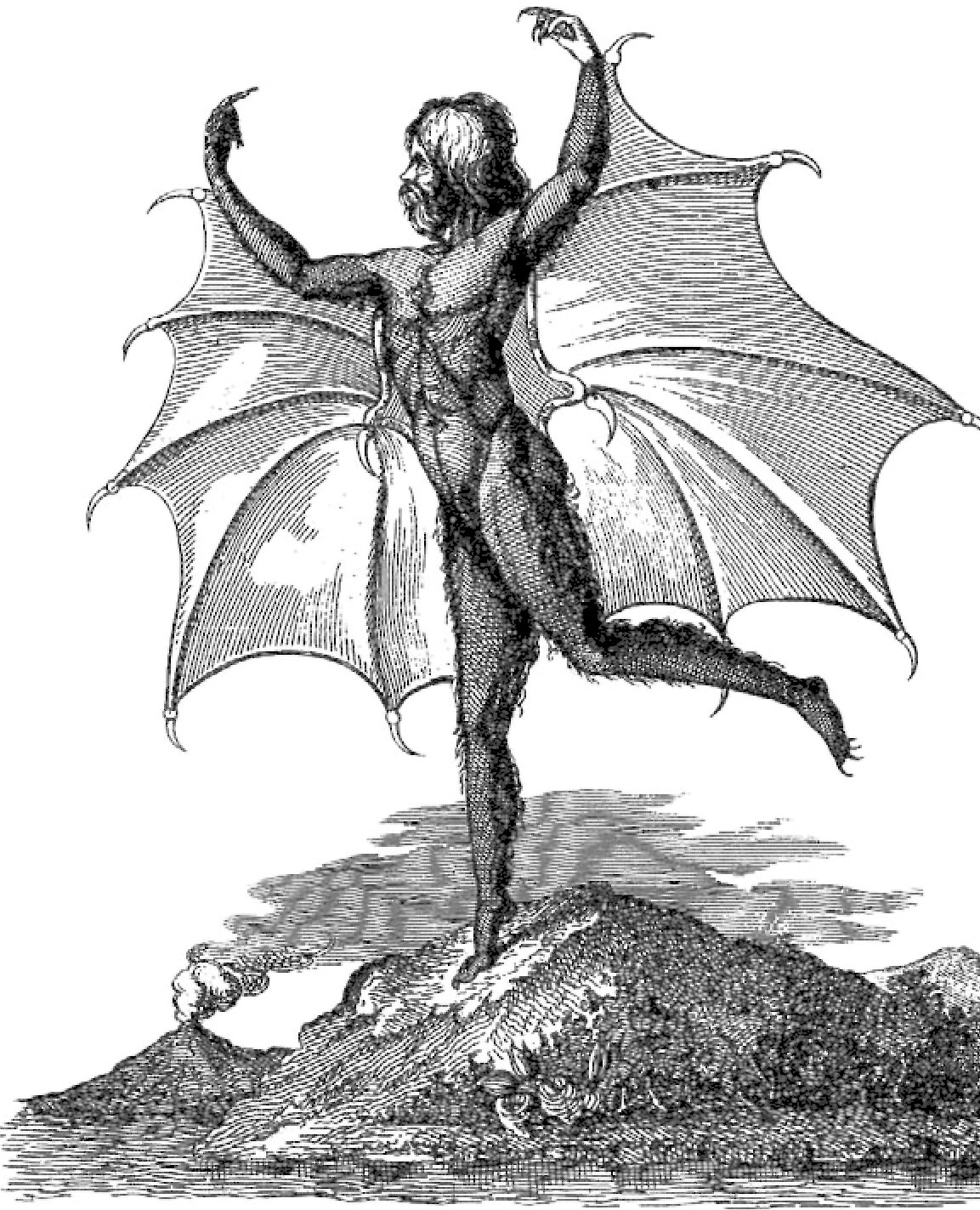
Bat-like figure of the Great Moon Hoax, published by the Sun

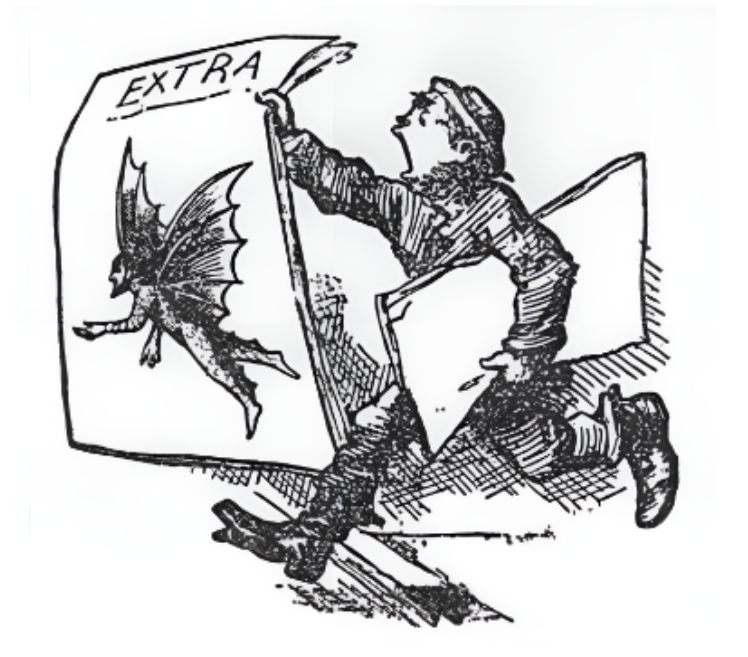
Newsboy showing a copy of the Great Moon Hoax of 1835

The Sun first gained notice for its central role in the Great Moon Hoax of 1835, a fabricated story of life and civilization on the Moon which the paper falsely attributed to British astronomer John Herschel and never retracted. The hoax featured man-bat creatures named the "Vespertilio-homo" that inhabited the moon and built temples. A Yale University delegation was sent to look after the article, and the whole story created much sensation at the time.

On April 13, 1844, The Sun published a story by Edgar Allan Poe now known as "The Balloon-Hoax", retracted two days after publication. The story told of an imagined Atlantic crossing by hot-air balloon.

Today the paper is best known for the 1897 editorial "Is There a Santa Claus?" (commonly referred to as "Yes, Virginia, There Is a Santa Claus"), written by Francis Pharcellus Church.

John B. Bogart, city editor of The Sun between 1873 and 1890, made what is perhaps the most frequently quoted definition of the journalistic endeavor: "When a dog bites a man, that is not news, because it happens so often. But if a man bites a dog, that is news." (The quotation is frequently attributed to Charles Dana, The Sun editor and part-owner between 1868 and his death in 1897.)

From 1912, Don Marquis wrote a regular column, 'The Sundial', for the Evening Sun. In 1916, he used this to introduce his characters Archy and Mehitabel.

In 1926, The Sun published a review by John Grierson of Robert Flaherty's film Moana, in which Grierson said the film had "documentary value". This is considered the origin of the term "documentary film".

The newspaper's editorial cartoonist, Rube Goldberg, received the 1948 Pulitzer Prize for Editorial Cartooning for his cartoon, Peace Today. In 1949, The Sun won the Pulitzer Prize for Local Reporting for a groundbreaking series of articles by Malcolm Johnson, "Crime on the Waterfront". The series served as the basis for the 1954 movie On the Waterfront.

The Sun's first female reporter was Emily Verdery Bettey, hired in 1868. Eleanor Hoyt Brainerd was hired as a reporter and fashion editor in the 1880s. Brainerd was one of the first women to become a professional editor, and perhaps the first full-time fashion editor in American newspaper history.

In 1881, the heroic legend of sheriff Bartholomew Masterson, known as "Bat Masterson", started from the coverage of a Sun reporter whom he had duped. He was a companion of Buffalo Bill, and fought at the Battle of Dodge City War, and was later the subject of a book titled Gunfighter in Gotham and the American TV series Bat Masterson.

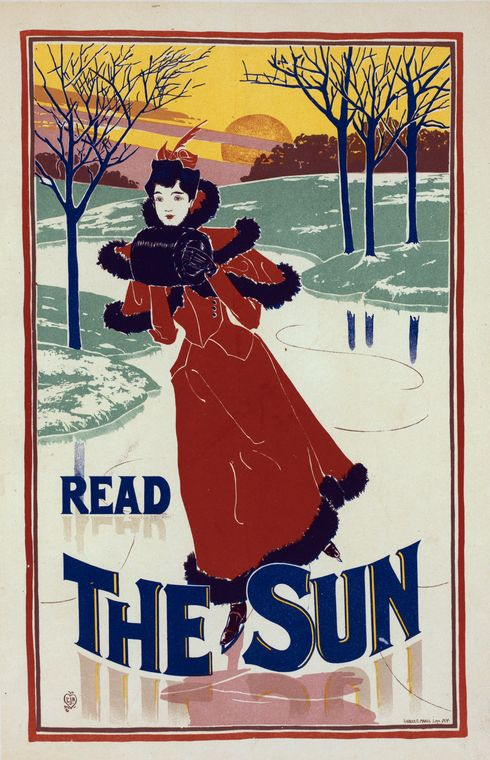
Advertising poster.
Louis Rhead, 1900

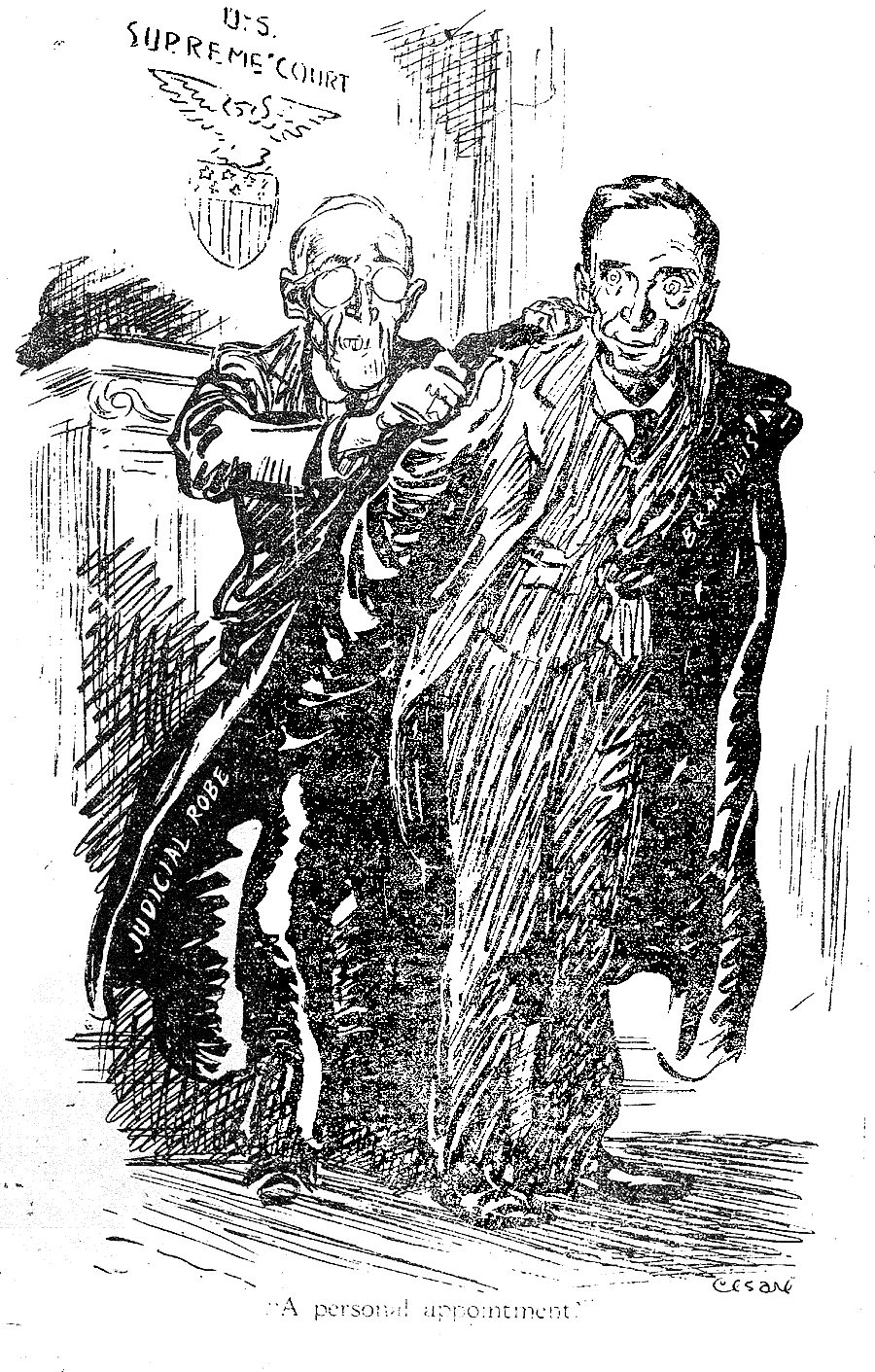
Louis Brandeis, political cartoon, January 31, 1916

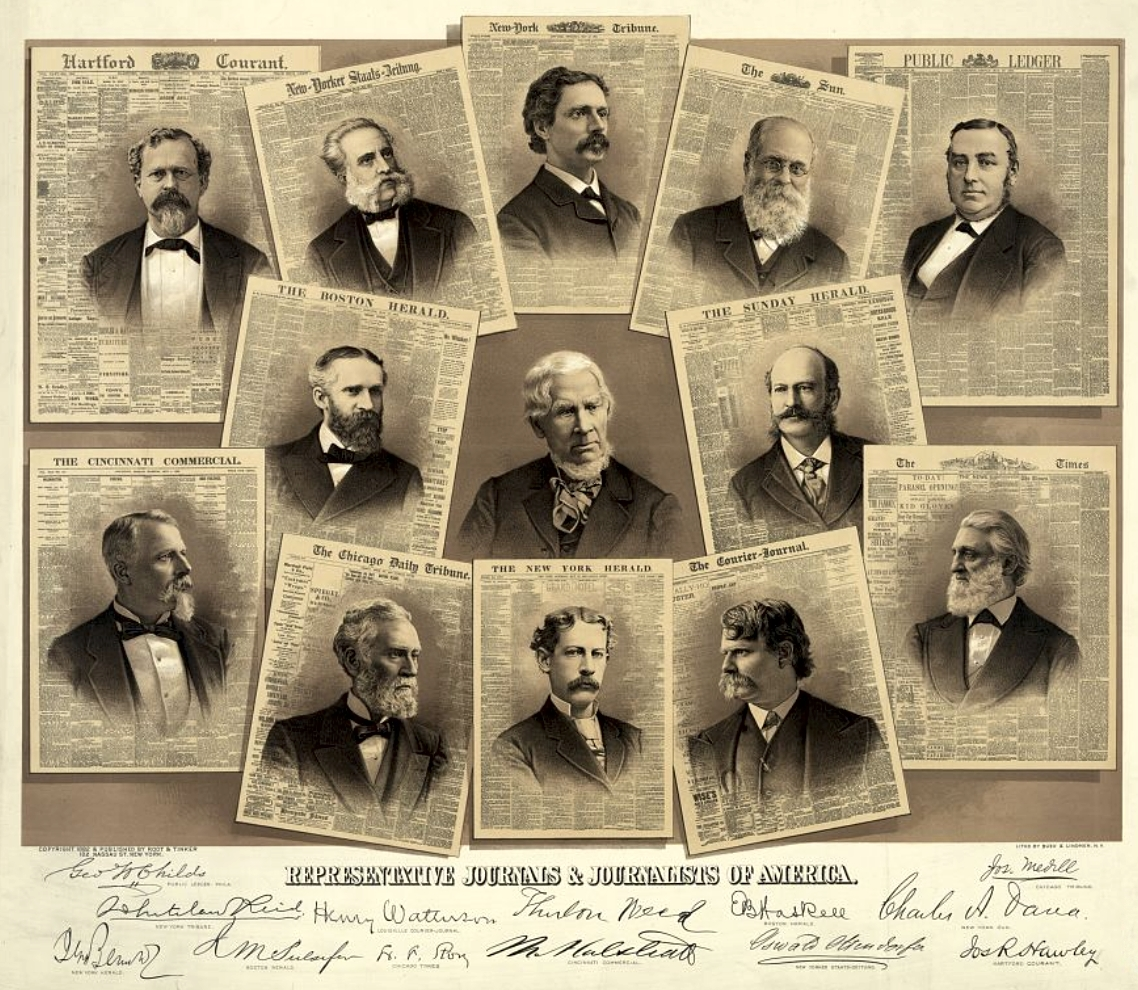
Representative journals, competitor James Gordon Bennett, 1882

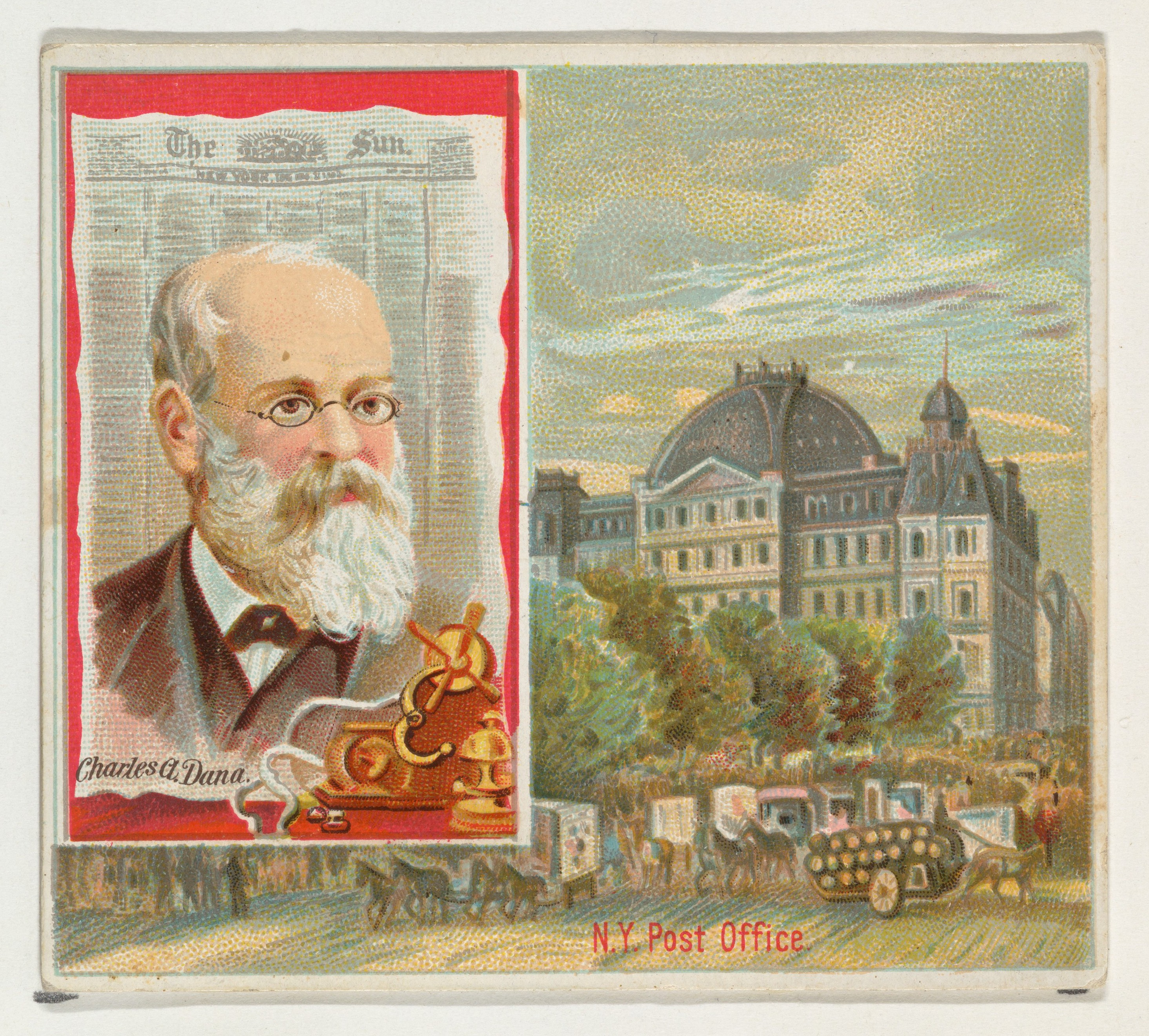
Charles A. Dana, from the American Editors series, 1887

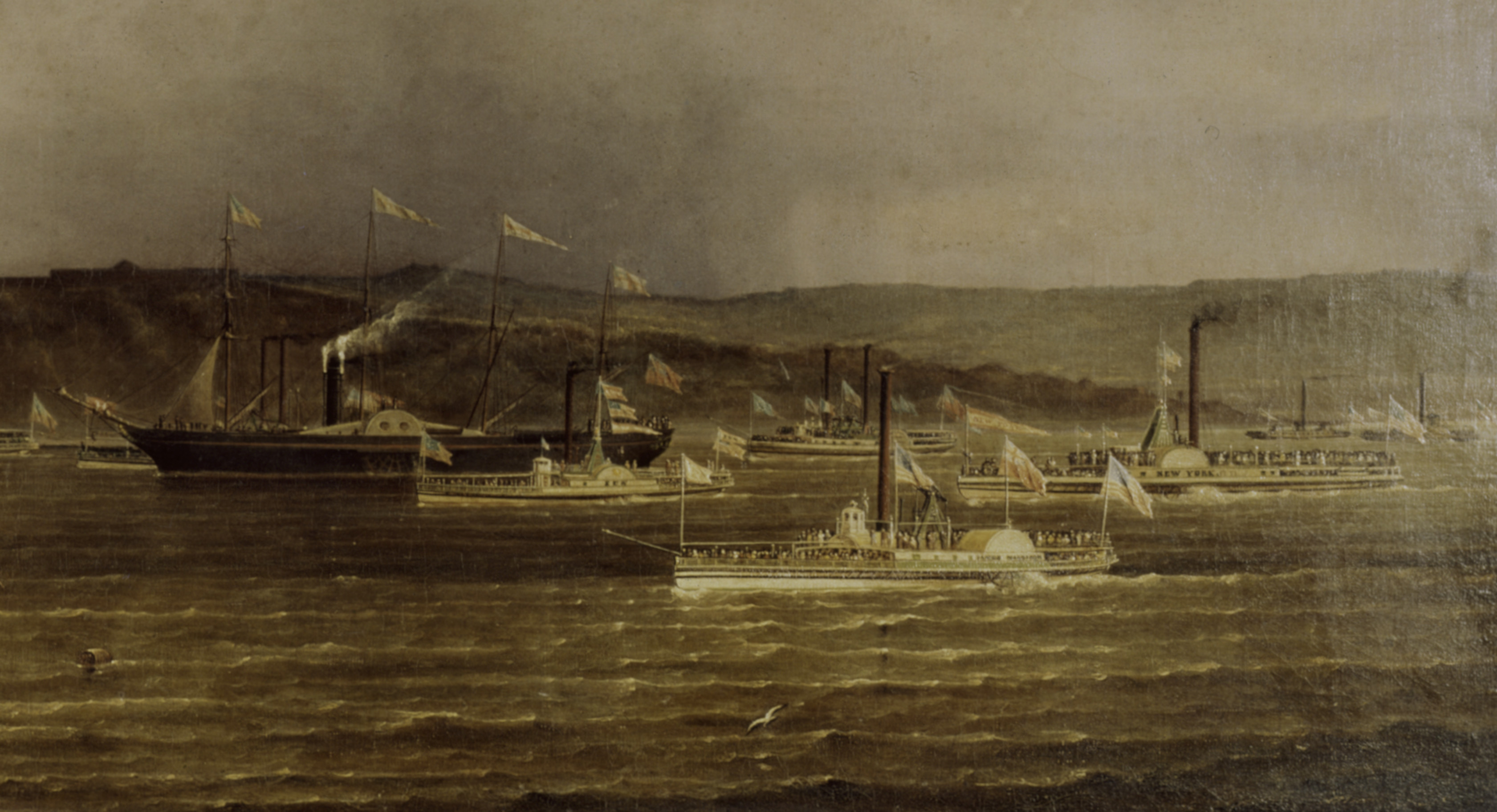
New York Harbor, receiving news from Europe, Great Western, 1838

== Legacy ==
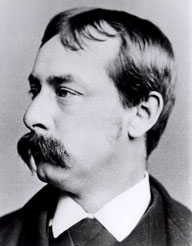
Francis Pharcellus Church, author of the famous 1897 Sun editorial which, in answer to a letter from eight-year-old Virginia O'Hanlon, contains the line "Yes, Virginia, there is a Santa Claus"

The film Deadline – U.S.A. (1952) is a story about the death of a New York newspaper called The Day, loosely based upon the Sun, which closed in 1950. The original Sun newspaper was edited by Benjamin Day, making the film's newspaper name a play on words (not to be confused with the real-life New London, Connecticut newspaper of the same name).

The masthead of the original Sun is visible in a montage of newspaper clippings in a scene of the 1972 film The Godfather. The newspaper's offices were a converted department store at 280 Broadway, between Chambers and Reade streets in lower Manhattan, now known as "The Sun Building" and famous for the clocks that bear the newspaper's masthead and motto. They were recognized as a New York City landmark in 1986. The building now houses the New York City Department of Buildings.

In the 1994 movie The Paper, a fictional tabloid newspaper based in New York City bore the same name and motto of The Sun, with a slightly different masthead.

In 2002, a new broadsheet was launched, styled The New York Sun, and bearing the old newspaper's masthead and motto. It was intended as a "conservative alternative" and local news-focused alternative to the more liberal The New York Times and other New York newspapers. It was published by Ronald Weintraub and edited by Seth Lipsky, and ceased publication on September 30, 2008. In 2022, it was revived as an online newspaper, under the ownership of Dovid Efune, while Lipsky remained editor.

The history of the New York Sun is extensively covered in the Pulitzer Prize-winning book Gotham: A History of New York City to 1898. Past reporters of the paper have included NYC Police Commissioner, Col. Arthur H. Woods, and NYC Fire Commissioner Robert Adamson.

== Journalists at The Sun ==
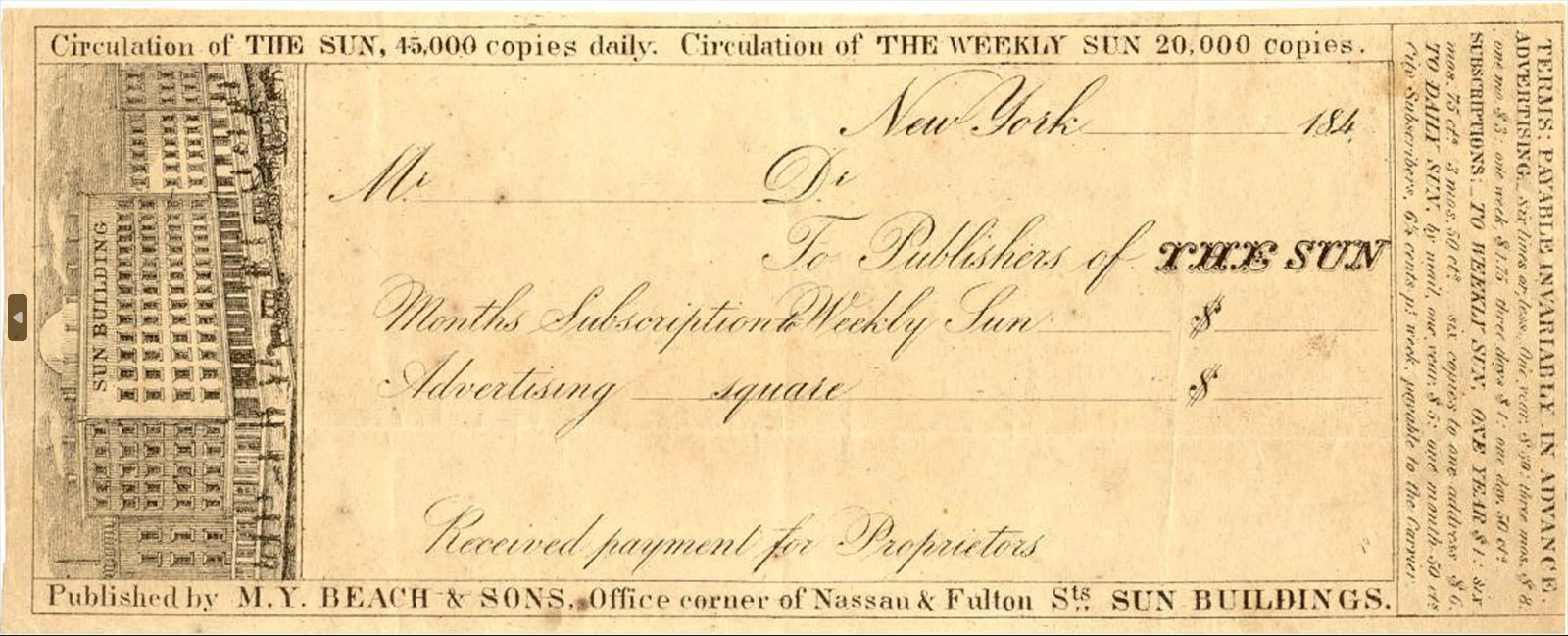
Subscription slip, the New York Sun, ca. 1845, featuring their offices on the left

- John A. Arneaux, reporter in 1884
- Moses Yale Beach, an early owner of the Sun
- Charles Anderson Dana, editor and part-owner of the Sun
- Paul Dana, editor, 1880–1897
- W. C. Heinz, war correspondent, sportswriter 1937–1950
- Bruno Lessing, reporter, 1888–1894
- Chester Sanders Lord, journalist and managing editor, 1873–1913
- Kenneth M. Swezey, radio/technology reporter, 1930s
- John Swinton, chief editorialist, 1875–1883 and 1892–1897

== Gallery ==
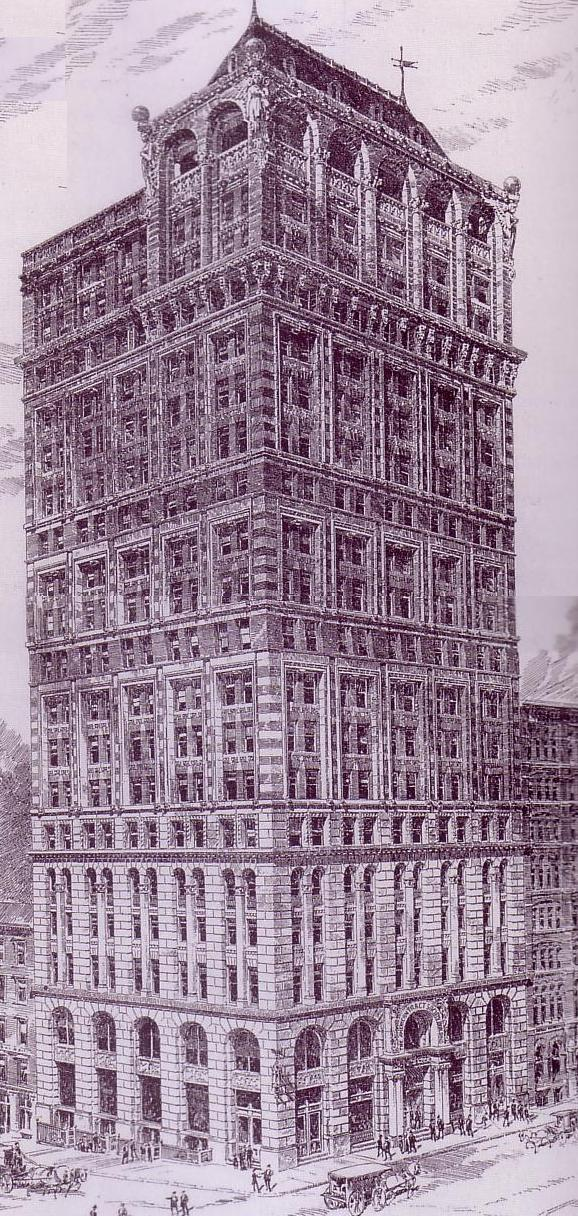
The Sun offices between 1914 and 1919 at 150 Nassau Street

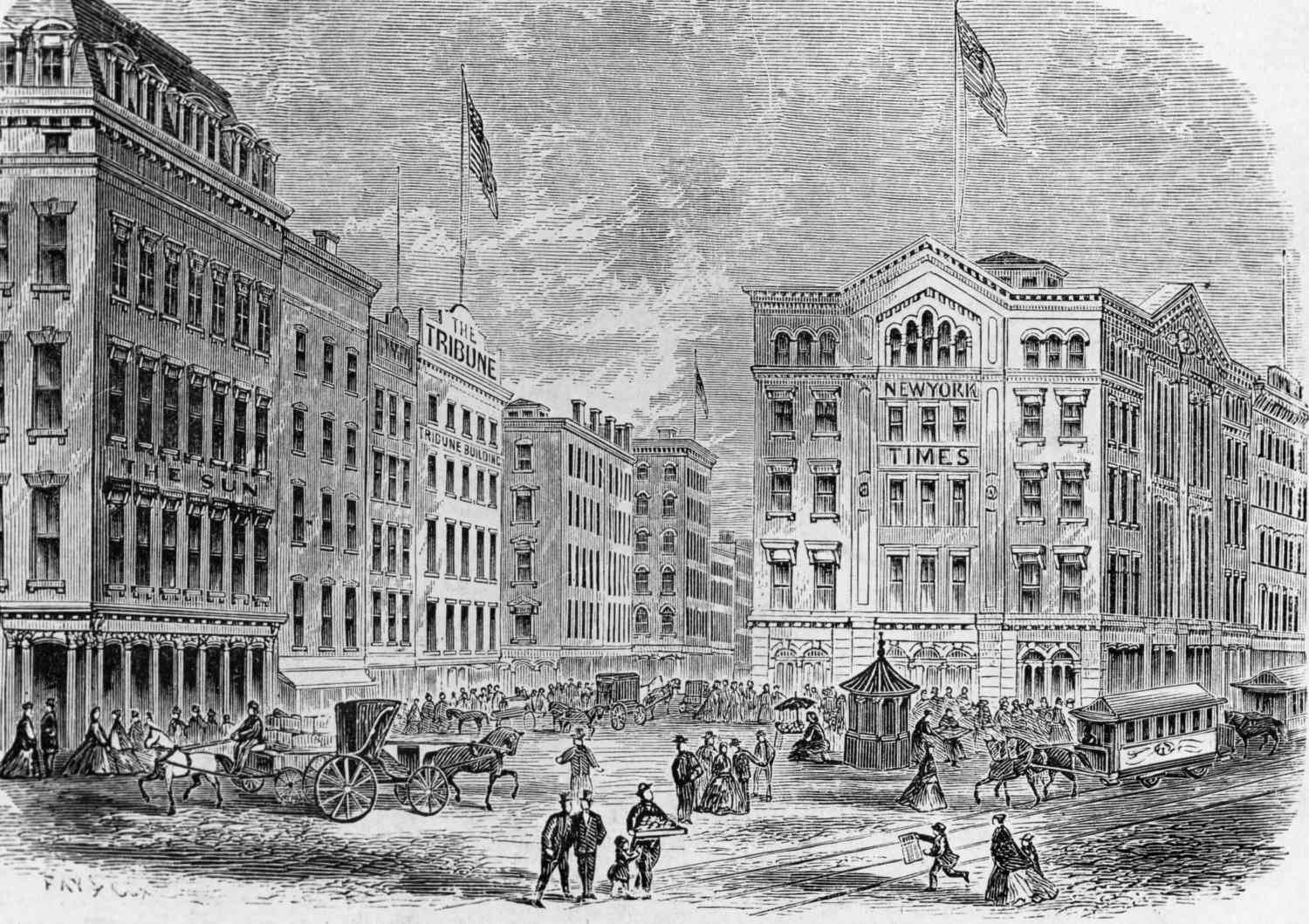
Newspaper Row, New York City; the Sun on the left

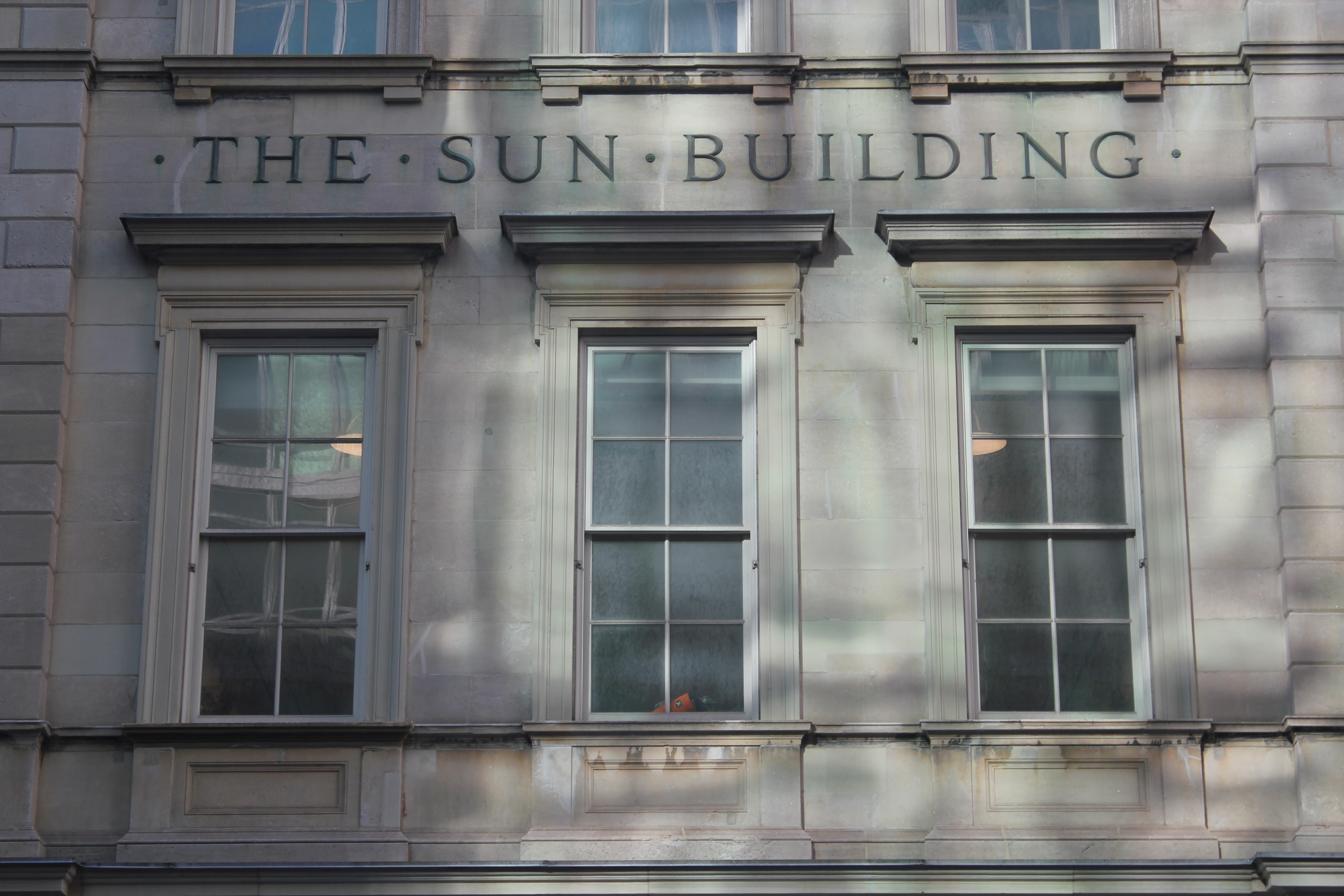
View of The Sun Building name on Broadway

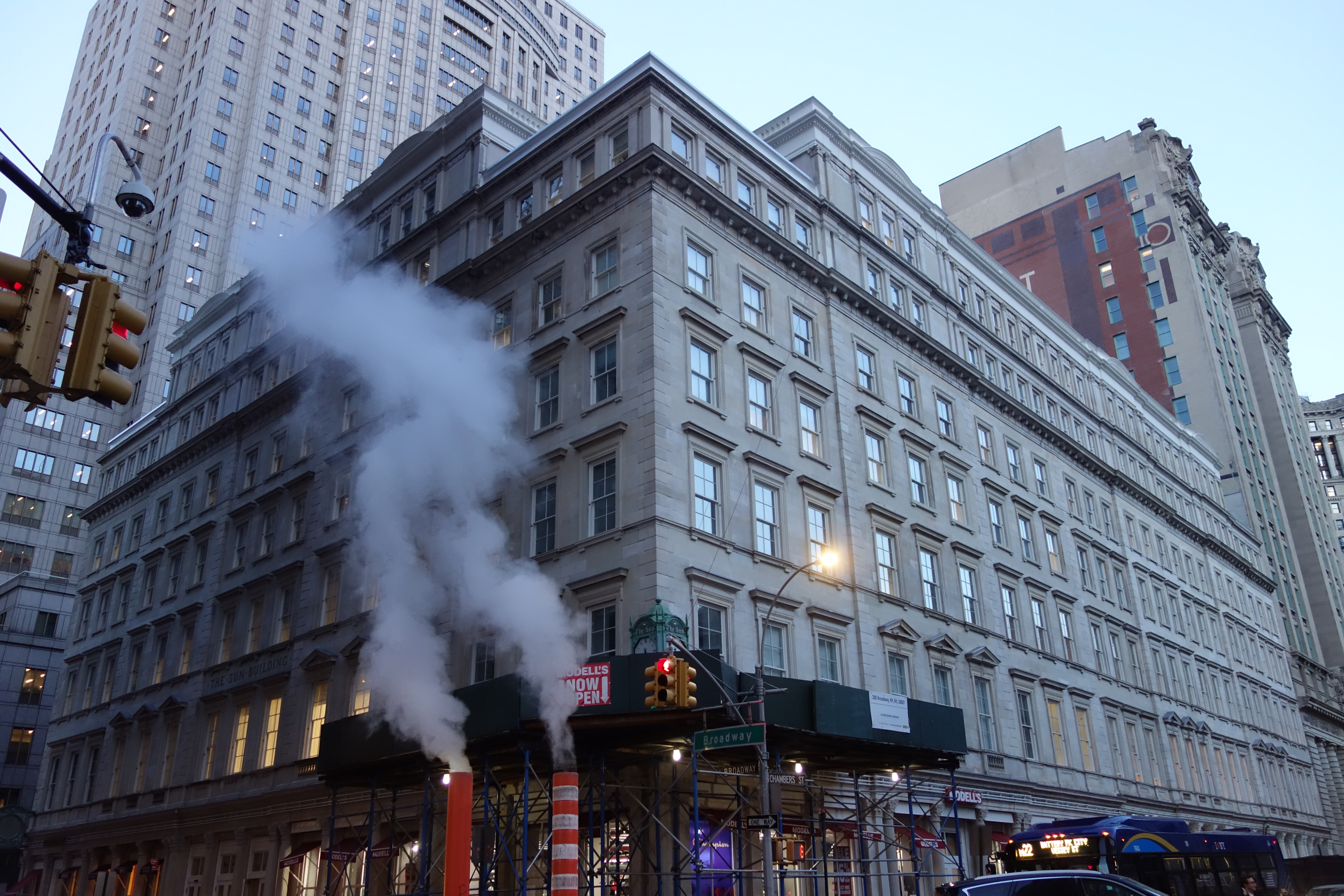
The "Sun Building" at 280 Broadway, from 1919 to 1950

== See also ==
- List of defunct American periodicals
