= Senator Rains =

Senator Rains or Raines may refer to:

- Emory Rains (1800–1878), Texas State Senate
- James S. Rains (1817–1880), Missouri State Senate
- Omer Rains (born 1941), California State Senate
- George Raines (1846–1908), New York State Senate
- John Raines (1840–1909), New York State Senate
