= 104th New York State Legislature =

New York state legislative session

←	103rd	105th	→
- New York State Capitol (2009)

Overview
- Legislative body: New York State Legislature
- Jurisdiction: New York, United States
- Term: January 1 – December 31, 1881

Senate
- Members: 32
- President: Lt. Gov. George G. Hoskins (R)
- Temporary President: William H. Robertson (R); Dennis McCarthy (R), from July 22
- Party control: Republican (25-7)

Assembly
- Members: 128
- Speaker: George H. Sharpe (R)
- Party control: Republican (81-47)

Sessions
- 1st: January 4 – July 23, 1881

The 104th New York State Legislature, consisting of the New York State Senate and the New York State Assembly, met from January 4 to July 23, 1881, during the second year of Alonzo B. Cornell's governorship, in Albany.

== Background ==
Under the provisions of the New York Constitution of 1846, 32 Senators and 128 assemblymen were elected in single-seat districts; senators for a two-year term, assemblymen for a one-year term. The senatorial districts were made up of entire counties, except New York County (seven districts) and Kings County (three districts). The Assembly districts were made up of entire towns, or city wards, forming a contiguous area, all within the same county.

At this time there were two major political parties: the Republican Party and the Democratic Party. The Republicans were split into two factions: the Stalwarts and the Half-Breeds. The Greenback Party also nominated a ticket.

== Elections ==
The 1880 New York state election was held on November 2. The only statewide elective office up for election was carried by a Republican. The approximate party strength at this election, as expressed by the vote for Chief Judge of the Court of Appeals, was: Republican 563,000; Democratic 518,000; and Greenback 13,000.

== Sessions ==
The Legislature met for the regular session at the State Capitol in Albany on January 4, 1881; and adjourned on July 23.

George H. Sharpe (R) was re-elected Speaker, with 80 votes against 45 for Erastus Brooks (D).

On January 18, the Legislature elected Thomas C. Platt (R) to succeed Francis Kernan (D) as U.S. Senator from New York, for a term beginning on March 4, 1881.

On March 24, President James A. Garfield (Half-Breed) nominated President pro tempore of the State Senate William H. Robertson (Half-Breed) for the office of Collector of the Port of New York. The two U.S. Senators from New York, Roscoe Conkling and Platt (both Stalwarts) openly opposed the nomination, causing deadlock in the Senate which was evenly divided with 37 Republicans, 37 Democrats and two Independents. The office of Collector of the Port of New York was the most profitable federal office in the United States, and Conkling insisted in having a Stalwart appointed, but Garfield did not budge.

On May 16, Conkling and Platt resigned in protest, leaving the Republicans in the minority in the U.S. Senate. Conkling believed that they would be re-elected by the New York State Legislature and would thus show Garfield that they were in a balance of power position.

On May 18, Robertson was confirmed by the U.S. Senate as Collector.

On May 31, the Legislature began the special elections to fill the two vacant seats in the U.S. Senate.

On July 16, Congressman Warner Miller was elected on the 48th ballot to succeed Platt.

On July 22, Congressman Elbridge G. Lapham was elected on the 56th ballot to succeed Conkling, thus ending 53 days of deadlock, the second longest in the history of the New York Legislature. After the election, Robertson resigned his seat in the State Senate, to accept the office of Collector, and Dennis McCarthy was elected president pro tempore.

== State Senate ==
=== Districts ===
- 1st District: Queens and Suffolk counties
- 2nd District: 1st, 2nd, 5th, 6th, 8th, 9th, 10th, 12th and 22nd Ward of the City of Brooklyn, and the towns of Flatbush, Gravesend and New Utrecht in Kings County
- 3rd District: 3rd, 4th, 7th, 11th, 13th, 19th, 20th, 21st and 23rd Ward of the City of Brooklyn
- 4th District: 14th, 15th, 16th, 17th, 18th, 24th and 25th Ward of the City of Brooklyn, and the towns of New Lots and Flatlands in Kings County
- 5th District: Richmond County and the 1st, 2nd, 3rd, 5th, 6th, 8th, 14th and parts of the 4th and 9th Ward of New York City
- 6th District: 7th, 11th, 13th and part of the 4th Ward of NYC
- 7th District: 10th, 17th and part of the 15th, 18th and 21st Ward of NYC
- 8th District: 16th and part of the 9th, 15th, 18th, 20th and 21st Ward of NYC
- 9th District: Part of the 18th, 19th and 21st Ward of NYC
- 10th District: Part of the 12th, 19th, 20th, 21st and 22nd Ward of NYC
- 11th District: 23rd and 24th, and part of the 12th, 20th and 22nd Ward of NYC
- 12th District: Rockland and Westchester counties
- 13th District: Orange and Sullivan counties
- 14th District: Greene, Schoharie and Ulster counties
- 15th District: Columbia, Dutchess and Putnam counties
- 16th District: Rensselaer and Washington counties
- 17th District: Albany County
- 18th District: Fulton, Hamilton, Montgomery, Saratoga and Schenectady counties
- 19th District: Clinton, Essex and Warren counties
- 20th District: Franklin, Lewis and St. Lawrence counties
- 21st District: Oswego and Jefferson counties
- 22nd District: Oneida County
- 23rd District: Herkimer, Madison and Otsego counties
- 24th District: Chenango, Delaware and Broome counties
- 25th District: Onondaga and Cortland counties
- 26th District: Cayuga, Seneca, Tompkins and Tioga counties
- 27th District: Allegany, Chemung and Steuben counties
- 28th District: Ontario, Schuyler, Wayne and Yates counties
- 29th District: Monroe and Orleans counties
- 30th District: Genesee, Livingston, Niagara and Wyoming counties
- 31st District: Erie County
- 32nd District: Cattaraugus and Chautauqua counties

Note: There are now 62 counties in the State of New York. The counties which are not mentioned in this list had not yet been established, or sufficiently organized, the area being included in one or more of the abovementioned counties.

=== Members ===
The asterisk (*) denotes members of the previous Legislature who continued in office as members of this Legislature.

District	Senator	Party	Notes
1st	John Birdsall*	Republican	
2nd	William H. Murtha*	Democrat	
3rd	Frederick A. Schroeder*	Republican	
4th	John C. Jacobs*	Democrat	
5th	Edward Hogan*	Democrat	
6th	Jacob Seebacher*	Democrat	
7th	Ferdinand Eidman*	Republican	
8th	Robert H. Strahan*	Republican	
9th	Francis M. Bixby*	Democrat	
10th	William W. Astor*	Republican	
11th	George H. Forster*	Republican	
12th	William H. Robertson*	Republican	President pro tempore; resigned after appointment as Collector of the Port of New York
13th	Edward M. Madden*	Republican	
14th	Charles A. Fowler*	Democrat	
15th	Stephen H. Wendover*	Republican	
16th	Isaac V. Baker Jr.*	Republican	
17th	Waters W. Braman*	Republican	
18th	Webster Wagner*	Republican	
19th	William W. Rockwell*	Republican	
20th	Dolphus S. Lynde*	Republican	
21st	Bradley Winslow*	Republican	
22nd	James Stevens*	Democrat	
23rd	Albert M. Mills*	Republican	
24th	Edwin G. Halbert*	Republican	
25th	Dennis McCarthy*	Republican	on July 22, elected president pro tempore
26th	William B. Woodin*	Republican	
27th	Ira Davenport*	Republican	
28th	George P. Lord*	Republican	
29th	Edmund L. Pitts*	Republican	
30th	James H. Loomis*	Republican	
31st	Benjamin H. Williams*	Republican	
32nd	Loren B. Sessions*	Republican	also Supervisor of the Town of Harmony

=== Employees ===
- Clerk: John W. Vrooman
- Sergeant-at-Arms: John W. Corning
- Doorkeeper: James G. Caw
- Stenographer: Hudson C. Tanner

== State Assembly ==
=== Assemblymen ===
The asterisk (*) denotes members of the previous Legislature who continued as members of this Legislature.

District		Assemblymen	Party	Notes
Albany	1st	Miner Gallup	Democrat	
Albany	2nd	Andrew S. Draper	Republican	unsuccessfully contested by Daniel Casey (D)
Albany	3rd	Aaron B. Pratt	Democrat	
Albany	4th	George Campbell	Republican	
Allegany		Samuel H. Morgan*	Republican	
Broome		L. Coe Young	Republican	
Cattaraugus	1st	Samuel H. Bradley	Republican	
Cattaraugus	2nd	Joseph M. Congdon*	Republican	
Cayuga	1st	Thomas Hunter	Republican	
Cayuga	2nd	Hector H. Tuthill*	Republican	
Chautauqua	1st	Albert B. Sheldon	Republican	
Chautauqua	2nd	Milton M. Fenner	Republican	
Chemung		Henry C. Hoffman*	Democrat	
Chenango		Solomon K. Bemiss	Republican	
Clinton		Shepard P. Bowen	Republican	
Columbia		John Elbert Gillette*	Republican	
Cortland		Alburtis A. Carley	Republican	
Delaware		William Lewis	Republican	
Dutchess	1st	Isaac S. Carpenter*	Republican	
Dutchess	2nd	James E. Dutcher	Republican	
Erie	1st	Jeremiah Higgins	Democrat	
Erie	2nd	Frank Sipp*	Republican	
Erie	3rd	Arthur W. Hickman	Republican	
Erie	4th	George Bingham	Republican	
Erie	5th	Harvey J. Hurd*	Republican	
Essex		James W. Sheehy	Republican	
Franklin		William D. Brennan*	Republican	died March 7, 1881
Franklin		Samuel A. Beman	Republican	elected to fill vacancy on April 5
Fulton and Hamilton		David A. Wells*	Republican	
Genesee		Joseph W. Holmes	Republican	
Greene		Orlando L. Newton	Democrat	
Herkimer		William D. Gorsline*	Republican	
Jefferson	1st	Charles R. Skinner*	Republican	on November 8, 1881, elected to the 47th U.S. Congress to fill vacancy, in place of Warner Miller
Jefferson	2nd	Henry Binninger	Republican	
Kings	1st	John Shanley*	Democrat	
Kings	2nd	John McTernan*	Democrat	
Kings	3rd	Lawrence J. Tormey*	Democrat	
Kings	4th	John M. Clancy*	Democrat	
Kings	5th	Thomas J. Sheridan*	Democrat	
Kings	6th	Patrick J. Tully*	Democrat	
Kings	7th	John Reitz	Republican	
Kings	8th	Moses Engle	Democrat	
Kings	9th	Charles H. Russell*	Republican	
Kings	10th	Richard J. Newman*	Democrat	
Kings	11th	William H. Waring	Republican	
Kings	12th	Jaques J. Stillwell	Democrat	
Lewis		Charles A. Chickering*	Republican	
Livingston		Kidder M. Scott	Republican	
Madison		David A. Jackson	Republican	
Monroe	1st	George Le Grand Seeley*	Republican	
Monroe	2nd	John Cowles	Republican	
Monroe	3rd	Frederick P. Root*	Republican	
Montgomery		Cornelius Van Buren	Republican	
New York	1st	Michael C. Murphy	Democrat	
New York	2nd	Constantine Donoho	Democrat	
New York	3rd	Thomas Smith Jr.	Democrat	
New York	4th	John Henry McCarthy*	Democrat	
New York	5th	Thomas Bogan	Democrat	
New York	6th	Matthew Patten	Democrat	
New York	7th	Isaac Israel Hayes*	Republican	died on December 17, 1881
New York	8th	John E. Brodsky*	Republican	
New York	9th	John W. Browning	Democrat	
New York	10th	Charles E. Brehm	Republican	
New York	11th	Robert Ray Hamilton	Republican	
New York	12th	Louis Cohen*	Democrat	
New York	13th	Arthur D. Williams	Republican	
New York	14th	John Murphy	Democrat	
New York	15th	Michael J. Dougherty*	Democrat	
New York	16th	Francis B. Spinola	Democrat	
New York	17th	James Fanning	Democrat	
New York	18th	Joseph P. McDonough	Democrat	
New York	19th	William B. Finley	Democrat	
New York	20th	Frederick Thilemann Jr.*	Democrat	
New York	21st	William J. Trimble	Republican	
New York	22nd	William S. Andrews	Democrat	
New York	23rd	Charles W. Dayton	Democrat	
New York	24th	William W. Niles	Democrat	
Niagara	1st	Elijah Adams Holt	Republican	
Niagara	2nd	James Low*	Republican	
Oneida	1st	James Armstrong	Republican	
Oneida	2nd	David G. Evans	Republican	
Oneida	3rd	Thomas D. Roberts	Republican	
Onondaga	1st	Thomas G. Alvord*	Republican	
Onondaga	2nd	Albert Howland*	Republican	
Onondaga	3rd	Henry L. Duguid*	Republican	
Ontario		John Raines	Republican	
Orange	1st	Joseph M. Dickey	Republican	
Orange	2nd	William Harvey Clark	Democrat	
Orleans		Marcus H. Phillips*	Republican	
Oswego	1st	Patrick W. Cullinan*	Republican	
Oswego	2nd	William H. Steele*	Republican	
Otsego	1st	J. Stanley Browne	Democrat	
Otsego	2nd	David Russell	Republican	
Putnam		Samuel H. Everett	Republican	
Queens	1st	Townsend D. Cock	Democrat	
Queens	2nd	George E. Bulmer	Democrat	
Rensselaer	1st	Charles E. Patterson	Democrat	
Rensselaer	2nd	Richard A. Derrick	Republican	
Rensselaer	3rd	Barnis C. Strait*	Democrat	
Richmond		Erastus Brooks	Democrat	Minority Leader
Rockland		John Cleary	Democrat	
St. Lawrence	1st	Daniel Peck*	Republican	
St. Lawrence	2nd	Worth Chamberlain*	Republican	
St. Lawrence	3rd	Ebenezer S. Crapser*	Republican	
Saratoga	1st	Benjamin F. Baker*	Republican	
Saratoga	2nd	Delcour S. Potter*	Republican	
Schenectady		George Lasher	Republican	
Schoharie		John J. Dominic	Democrat	
Schuyler		Lewis Beach*	Republican	
Seneca		Samuel R. Welles	Democrat	
Steuben	1st	Charles S. Longwell	Democrat	
Steuben	2nd	Russell M. Tuttle*	Republican	
Suffolk		Everett A. Carpenter*	Republican	
Sullivan		Edward H. Pinney	Democrat	
Tioga		Edward G. Nowlan*	Republican	
Tompkins		Truman Boardman	Republican	
Ulster	1st	George H. Sharpe*	Republican	re-elected Speaker
Ulster	2nd	Marius Turck	Republican	
Ulster	3rd	Thomas E. Benedict*	Democrat	
Warren		Benjamin C. Butler	Republican	
Washington	1st	Hiram Sisson*	Republican	
Washington	2nd	James E. Goodman	Republican	
Wayne	1st	Rowland Robinson	Republican	
Wayne	2nd	Addison W. Gates	Republican	
Westchester	1st	William F. Moller	Democrat	
Westchester	2nd	William H. Catlin*	Democrat	
Westchester	3rd	James W. Husted*	Republican	previously a member from Rockland Co.
Wyoming		George M. Palmer	Republican	
Yates		Asa P. Fish*	Republican	

=== Employees ===
- Clerk: Edward M. Johnson
- Sergeant-at-Arms: Sidney M. Robinson
- Doorkeeper: Henry Wheeler
- First Assistant Doorkeeper: Michael Maher
- Second Assistant Doorkeeper: John W. Wheeler
- Stenographer: Worden E. Payne

== Sources ==
- Civil List and Constitutional History of the Colony and State of New York compiled by Edgar Albert Werner (1884; see pg. 276 for Senate districts; pg. 291 for senators; pg. 298–304 for Assembly districts; and pg. 379f for assemblymen)
- THE NEW ASSEMBLY in NYT on November 4, 1880
- GEN. SHARPE THE SPEAKER in NYT on January 4, 1881
