= Senator Emerson =

Senator Emerson may refer to:

- Bill Emmerson (born 1945), California State Senate
- James A. Emerson (1865–1922), New York State Senate
- Lee E. Emerson (1898–1976), Vermont State Senate
- Louis W. Emerson (1857–1924), New York State Senate
- Robert L. Emerson (born 1948), Michigan State Senate
- William N. Emerson (1821–1891), New York State Senate
