= Joseph Congdon =

Joseph Congdon may refer to:

- Joseph Whipple Congdon, American botanist
- Joseph M. Congdon, American lawyer and politician from New York
