= George E. Williams =

George E. Williams may refer to:

- George E. Williams (geologist), Australian geologist
- George E. Williams (New Jersey politician), member of the New Jersey General Assembly
- George E. Williams (New York politician) (1828–1914), New York assemblyman, 1879
- George Ebenezer Williams (1783−1819), English organist and composer
- George Emlyn Williams (1905–1987), Welsh dramatist and actor

== See also ==
- George Williams (disambiguation)
