= William Woodin =

William Woodin may refer to:

- William H. Woodin (1868–1934), U.S. industrialist
- William B. Woodin (1824–1893), American lawyer and politician from New York
- W. Hugh Woodin (born 1955), American mathematician
