= Senator Lord =

Senator Lord may refer to:

- Bert Lord (1869–1939), New York State Senate
- David Lord (politician) (1934–2005), Iowa State Senate
- George P. Lord (1831–1917), New York State Senate
- Harry T. Lord (1863–1923), New Hampshire State Senate
- Jarvis Lord (1816–1887), New York State Senate
- Jim Lord (1948–2008), Minnesota State Senate
- Otis Lord (1812–1884), Massachusetts State Senate
- Simon Lord (1826–1893), Wisconsin State Senate
- William A. Lord (1849–1927), Vermont State Senate
- William Paine Lord (1838–1911), Oregon State Senate
