= Lewis Beach =

Lewis Beach may refer to:

- Lewis Beach (politician, born 1835) (1835 –1886), American politician, U.S. representative from New York
- Lewis Beach (politician, born 1828) (1828–1918), American farmer and politician, member of the New York State Assembly
- Lewis Beach (playwright) (1891–1947), American playwright and author

== See also ==
- Lew Beach, New York, a hamlet in the town of Rockland, New York, named for the U.S. representative
