= William H. Steele (New York politician) =

American politician

William Henry Steele (November 1, 1838 – September 21, 1911) was an American lawyer and politician from New York.

== Life ==
Steele was born on November 1, 1838, in Windham, New York, the son of Col. Stephen Steele and Lucy Buel. His grandfather was assemblyman Perez Steele.

Steele attended a private academy in Roxbury, Connecticut, from 1848 to 1849, the Delaware Literary Institute in Franklin, New York, from 1849 to 1854, and Yale College from 1854 to 1858. One of his Yale classmates was Chauncey Depew. He then worked as a private tutor in New York City and as a teacher in Camden and Williamstown, New York for a few years. In 1862, he began studying law under John Olney at Windham. He was admitted to the bar in 1863. In 1865, he became a member of the law firm Cowles & Steele in Roxbury. He practiced law for a short while in Valley Falls and Hart's Falls, followed by two years in Camden as a member of the law firm Cromwell & Steele. In 1869, he moved to Williamstown. In 1871, the firm became Cromwell, Steele & Conlan. He then gave most of his law practice to his partners and focused on insurance. After the firm was dissolved in 1873, he formed a banking partnership with J. F. Morse called W. H. Steele & Co. The firm was renamed Steele & Morse in 1874. In 1876, he resumed his law practice, practicing on his own.

In 1878, Steele was elected to the New York State Assembly as a Republican, representing the Oswego County 3rd District. He served in the Assembly in 1879, 1880, and 1881. In 1882, he ended his insurance business and took over the hardware business E. Dixon & Co., renaming the business W. H. Steele & Co. In 1887, he moved to Pulaski. In 1889, he settled in Oswego. He bought a store and farm in Altmar in 1897, although he continued to live in Oswego. He was a delegate and Second Vice President of the 1894 New York State Constitutional Convention. He worked on the revising and indexing the Convention's records, a task that occupied him until 1899 and produced five printed volumes with a total of six thousand pages. In 1896 and 1897, he assisted Commissioner Lyman organize the state's new Excise Department.

Steele was active in the Freemasons, organizing a lodge for them in Schagticoke. He also organized the first Order of the Eastern Star lodge outside of New York City. He was a Congregationalist. In 1866, he married Augusta Burnhans of Delhi. They had three children, although only one survived them, their daughter Mrs. W. F. Ballou.

Steele died in his room at the Altmar House in Altmar on September 21, 1911. He was buried in Riverside Cemetery in Oswego.

New York State Assembly
| Preceded by DeWitt C. Peck | New York State Assembly; Oswego County, 3rd District; 1879 | Succeeded by District Abolished |
| Preceded by George E. Williams | New York State Assembly; Oswego County, 2nd District; 1880–1881 | Succeeded by Byron Helm |
