= List of mayors of Rome, New York =

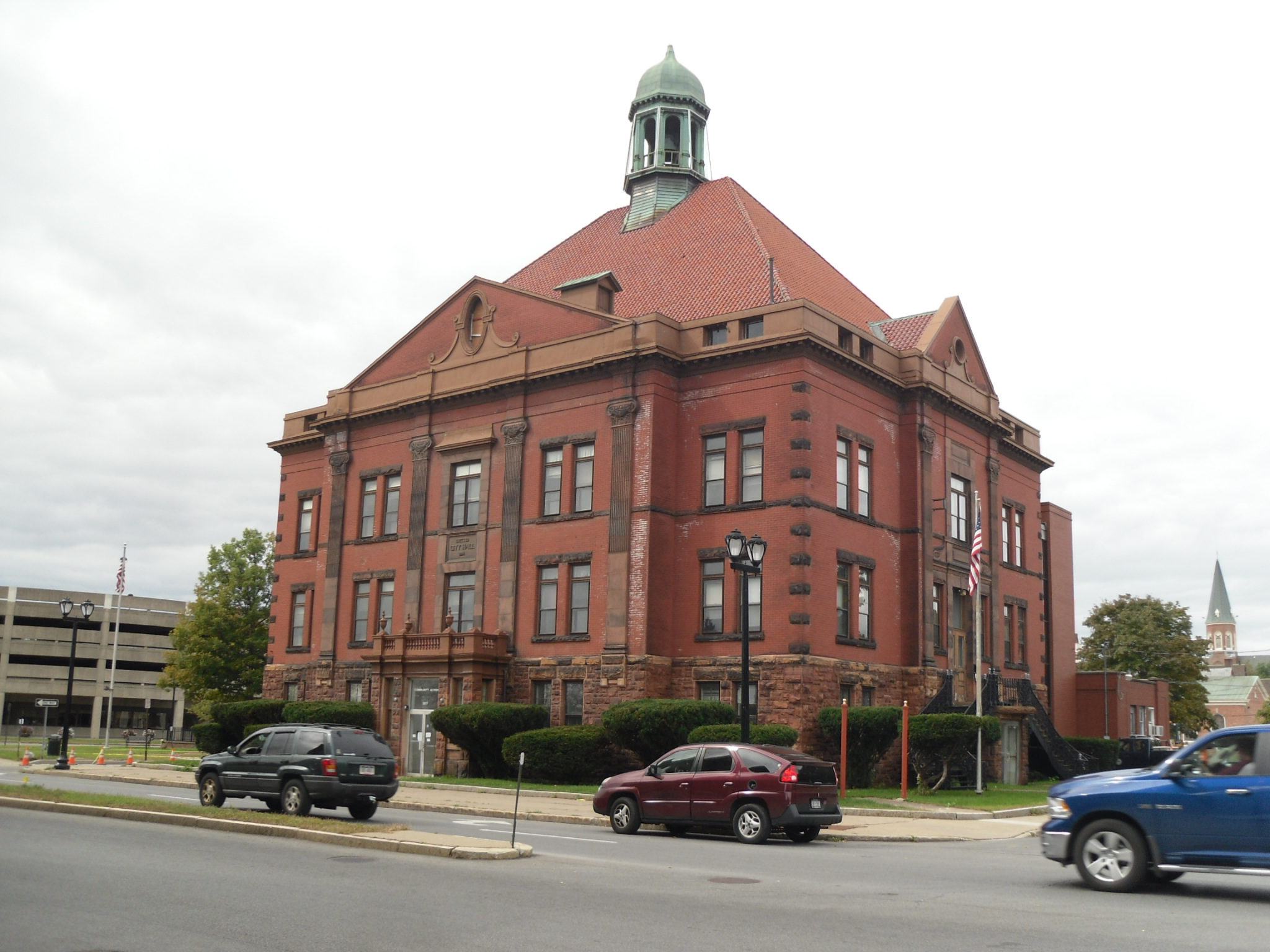
City hall building in Rome, New York (photo 2010)

The following is a list of mayors of the city of Rome, New York, United States.

- Calvert Comstock, 1870–1871
- George Merrill, 1872–1875
- Samuel B. Stevens, 1875–1877
- Edward L. Stevens, 1877–1878
- George Barnard, 1879–1881
- Edward Comstock, 1882–1883, 1885–1887
- Frederick E. Mitchell, 1883–1884
- James Stevens, 1887–1891
- E. Stuart Williams, 1891–1893
- Samuel Gillette, 1893–1895
- Wiley J. P. Kingsley, 1895–1899
- Abner S. White, 1899–1901
- Hedding A. Caswell, 1901–1904
- Thomas G. Nock, 1904–1906
- Albert R. Kessinger, 1906–1912
- Stuart E. Townsend, 1912–1914
- H. Clayton Midlam, 1914–1920
- G. Arthur Mickle, 1920–1922
- William B. Reid, 1922–1924, 1932–1934
- Fred L. Martin, 1924–1926
- Jeremiah H. Carroll, 1926–1928
- Arthur C. Tedd, 1928–1932, 1934–1936
- Ray Armstrong, 1936–1938
- E. Huntington Ethridge, 1938–1942
- Walter W. Abbott, 1942–1943
- John C. Schantz, 1944–1949
- Alfred M. Hoehn, 1950–1951
- David R. Townsend, 1952–1953
- Samuel Wardwell Jr., 1954–1955
- Joseph G. Herbst, 1956–1959
- Philip E. Tosti, 1959–1960
- Charles T. Lanigan, 1960–1962
- Lewis C. Wood, 1963–1954
- William A. Valentine, 1964–1980
- Carl J. Eilenberg, 1980–1992
- Joseph Griffo, 1992–2003
- John J. Mazzaferro, 2003–2004
- James F. Brown, 2004–2011
- Joseph R. Fusco Jr., 2011–2015
- Jacqueline M. Izzo, 2015–2023
- Jeffrey Lanigan, 2024–present

== See also ==
- History of Rome, New York
