= Mike Gormley =

Music executive, Journalist, Talent Manager and Broadcaster

- Born: John Michael Gormley; August 3, 1945 (age 81)
- Origin: Ottawa, Ontario, Canada
- Occupations: Music Executive, Journalist, Talent Manager and Broadcaster
- Years active: 1963–present
- Website: lapersdev.com

Mike Gormley (John Michael Gormley born August 3, 1945) is a Canadian-American music executive, journalist, talent manager and broadcaster. He is best known as music executive for A&M Records, Polygram Records, music journalist for the Detroit Free Press, the Ottawa Journal, the Chicago Sun-Times, Billboard Magazine, Variety Magazine, Creem Magazine, talent manager for artists including The Bangles, Oingo Boingo, Concrete Blonde, Jeff "Skunk" Baxter, soundtrack composers, and as a radio show and podcast broadcaster.

== Early life ==
Gormley was born in Ottawa, Ontario. He attended school in the San Francisco Bay Area. He returned to Ottawa to attend Algonquin College and to write for The Journal.

Gormley played drums with the rock band The Pharaohs, the first band in North America to play Beatle songs in a live set .

== Career ==
=== Journalism ===
Gormley was a weekly columnist and writer for The Ottawa Journal, covering The Byrds, Buffalo Springfield, The Everly Bros, among others.

He then moved to the United States and became Feature Writer for The Detroit Free Press The Detroit Free Press. On a freelance basis he was a music journalist for the Chicago Sun Times, Billboard Magazine, Variety Magazine, Creem Magazine and others.

Gormley was a writer for the daily newsletter published by editors of the Toronto Globe and Mail on behalf of Pierre Trudeau, then making his first run for head of the Liberal Party and Prime Minister of Canada.

=== Record executive and talent manager ===
Gormley was Director of Publicity, Mercury Records. Gormley was on the promo team for Bachman-Turner Overdrive, Rush and Rod Stewart.

As Phonogram Records director of publicity, Gormley hosted the reception given by the Canadian Consulate General and Phonogram Records to honor BTO on sales of over 1 million for their "Bachman-Turner Overdrive II" album.

In 1977, Gormley became public relations consultant to the Polygram Record Group, overseeing corporate pr for Phonogram which consisted of Mercury Records, Polydor, Phonodisc.

=== A&M Records ===
Gormley was the Vice President of Publicity and assistant to the chairman, Jerry Moss, of A&M Records, and became Vice President of Communications in 1980.

The position covered publicity, press and TV coverage and use of videos for cable and network TV. Gil Friesen, the President of A&M, was quoted as saying "Mike has distinguished himself under fire and established our publicity department as an important marketing force...".

In a Billboard story on Print and TV Interviews, Gormley was quoted as saying "Artists can be successful without press, but how long will their careers last? The image can make the career last."

With Atlantic Records' Paul Cooper, Gormley co-moderated a panel of publicists, including Norman Winter, Michael Gershman, Dennis Fine, Bob Jones, and Howard Bloom on the effects of Bad Press. Gormley has been a speaker on numerous panels including Billboard's International Talent Forum AGENDA.

In 1983 Gormley joined with Miles Copeland, then manager of the rock band The Police to form the management company LA Personal Direction (LAPD). Gormley managed pop and rock bands including the Bangles, Oingo Boingo, Concrete Blonde, Wall of Voodoo and launched Danny Elfman's film composing career.

As the first project in their soundtrack venture, James Newton Howard was set by Derek Power and Gormley to score Head Office, a Peter Guber-Jon Peters production via HBO Pictures in association with Silver Screen Partners.

Gormley ran his label Wildcat Records. In 1987, Gormley, Alan Somers and Miles Copeland formed the management company International Talent Bank, still continuing with their company LAPD. In 1996, Gormley was a speaker at Music West.

== Broadcasting ==
As radio show guest host and/or interviewer, Gormley's interviews include segment The Mike Gormley Show in The Jeremiah Show, hosted by Jeremiah D. Higgins, with Stewart Copeland, Aaron Zigman, Roxanne Seeman, Peter Asher, Stephen Kravit, Jeff "Skunk" Baxter and Quincy Coleman, and LA Talk Radio podcasts with Paul Zollo and Danny Goldberg.
