= New York Superintendent of State Prisons =

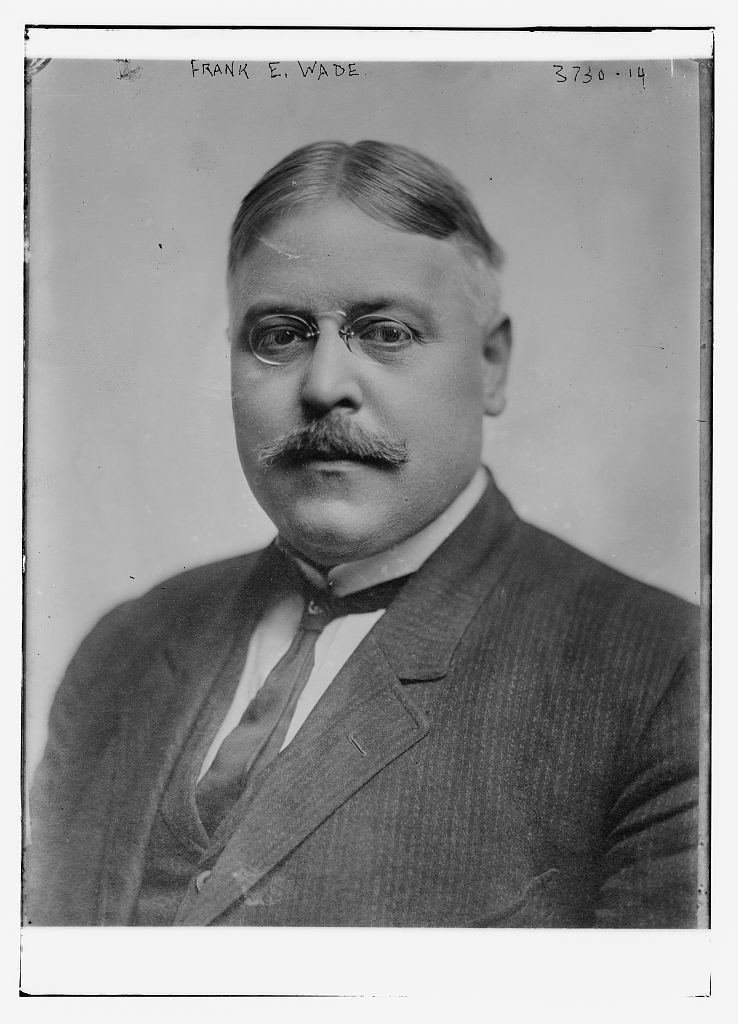
Frank E. Wade in 1916

The Superintendent of State Prisons was an officer of the New York State government, who was in charge of the administration of the state prisons. The office was created by a constitutional amendment ratified in 1876, to succeed the three statewide elective New York State Prison Inspectors. The Superintendent was appointed to a five-year term by the Governor of New York, and confirmed by the New York Senate.

== Office holders ==
- Louis D. Pilsbury 1877 to 1882.
- Isaac Volney Baker, Jr. (1843–1912) 1882 to 1887.
- Austin Lathrop. 1887 to 1898
- Cornelius V. Collins 1898 to 1911
- Joseph F. Scott (1860–1918) 1911 to 1913.
- John B. Riley 1913 to 1916.
- Frank Edward Wade (1864–1929) 1916 to ?.
- Charles F. Rattagan 1920.
