= Frank E. Wade (prison commissioner) =

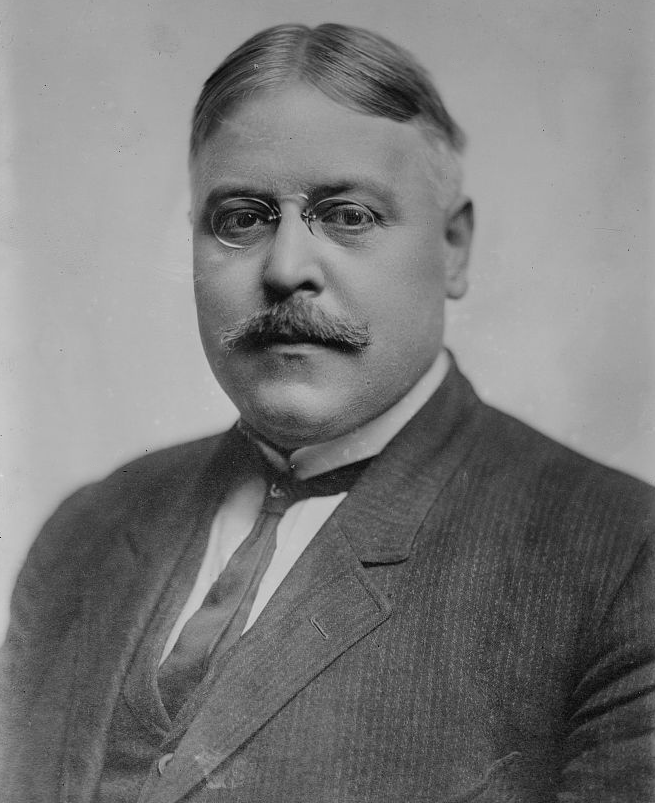

New York Superintendent of State Prisons
- In office 1916–1921
- Preceded by: John B. Riley

Personal details
- Born: December 14, 1865 Buffalo, New York, US
- Died: April 10, 1929 (aged 63) Buffalo, New York

Frank Edward Wade (December 14, 1865 – April 10, 1929) was an American lawyer who was president of the National Probation Association and in 1916 was appointed as the New York Superintendent of State Prisons.

== Biography ==
Wade was born December 14, 1864, in Buffalo, New York. He graduated from Cornell University in 1889, was admitted to the New York state bar in 1892, and began practicing law in Buffalo 1893.

He became the New York Superintendent of State Prisons in 1916 when he replaced John B. Riley who was charged with misconduct in office.

He was married to Grace A. Felton in 1898, and died in Buffalo on April 10, 1929.
