= George B. Sloan =

American politician

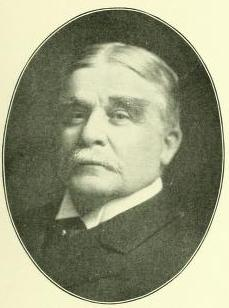
- George B. Sloan (1903)

Member of the New York State Senate
- In office 1886–1891
- Constituency: 21st District

Member of the New York State Assembly
- In office 1874, 1876–1877, 1879
- Constituency: 1st District

Personal details
- Born: George Beale Sloan; June 20, 1831 Oswego, New York
- Died: July 10, 1904 (aged 73) Oswego, New York
- Resting place: Riverside Cemetery
- Occupation: Politician, businessman, banker

George Beale Sloan (June 20, 1831 – July 10, 1904) was an American businessman, banker and politician.

== Life ==
George Beale Sloan was born in Oswego, New York, on June 20, 1831. From 1864 to 1884, he was co-owner of the firm of "Sloan & Irwin, flour commissioners" which held a large number of business interests. From 1884 until his death, he was President of the Second National Bank of Oswego.

He was a member of the New York State Assembly (Oswego Co., 1st D.) in 1874, 1876, 1877 and 1879, and was Speaker in 1877.

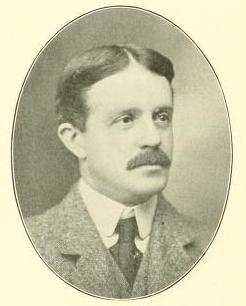
George B. Sloan Jr. (1903)

He was a member of the New York State Senate (21st D.) from 1886 to 1891, sitting in the 109th, 110th, 111th, 112th, 113th and 114th New York State Legislatures. He announced his retirement from politics on May 26, 1891.

In 1892, as a member of the Committee of the Detroit Deep Water Ways Convention in Washington, D.C., he gave his adverse opinion on the ruinously high import duty on Canadian barley.

Sloan was a presidential elector in 1896; and a delegate to the 1900 Republican National Convention.

He died in Oswego on July 10, 1904, and was buried at Riverside Cemetery.

His son George Beale Sloan Jr. committed suicide on July 10, 1914 (exactly 10 years after the death of his father), by jumping from a concrete bridge over Rye Lake at Kensico, New York.

New York State Assembly
Preceded by Daniel G. Fort	New York State Assembly; Oswego County, 1st District; 1874	Succeeded by Alanson S. Page
Preceded by Alanson S. Page	New York State Assembly; Oswego County, 1st District; 1876–1877	Succeeded by Charles North
Political offices
Preceded by James W. Husted	Speaker of the New York State Assembly; 1877	Succeeded by James W. Husted
New York State Assembly
Preceded by Charles North	New York State Assembly; Oswego County, 1st District; 1879	Succeeded by Patrick W. Cullinan
New York State Senate
Preceded by Frederick Lansing	New York State Senate; 21st District; 1886–1891	Succeeded by Joseph Mullin
