= James D. Warren =

American politician

James Dunlap Warren (January 12, 1823 – December 17, 1886) was an American newspaper publisher and politician from New York.

== Early life ==
Warren was born on January 12, 1823, in Bennington, New York, the son of Orsamus Warren (1800–1876) and Nancy (née Joslyn) Warren (1800–1843).

Warren moved to Wales with his family when he was two, later to Clarence. Growing up, he worked on the family farm and his father's store while attending school. When he was 20, he toured the South and spent a year in Natchez, Mississippi. After he returned North, he spent a few years working as a merchant and farmer in Clarence.

== Career ==
In 1854, he was elected County Treasurer of Erie County for a three-year term. He also served several terms as town supervisor and a few terms as clerk of the board of supervisors.

In 1861, Warren purchased the Buffalo Commercial Advertiser with Rufus Wheeler and Joseph Candee under the firm name Rufus Wheeler & Co. In 1862, Candee retired, James N. Matthews acquired an interest, and the firm was renamed Wheeler, Matthews & Warren. In 1865, Wheeler retired and Matthews became the chief editor of the newspaper. The new firm Matthews & Warren continued until 1877, when it was dissolved and Warren was left as the paper's sole proprietor for the rest of his life. After he died, his sons continued running the paper under the firm name James D. Warren's Sons. He was also president of White's Bank in Buffalo.

A member of the Republican Party since its inception, Warren became of the most outspoken Republicans in Buffalo. He was a delegate to nearly every state convention from 1871 to 1885 and served as Chairman of the New York Republican State Committee from 1883 to 1884. He was a delegate to the 1880 Republican National Convention, where he was one of the 306 delegates that supported General Grant through the entire convention. He was also a delegate to the 1884 Republican National Convention, where he supported Chester A. Arthur.

== Personal life ==
Warren was a Presbyterian. In 1845, he married Laura Love of Clarence. Their son was born in 1846. In 1853, Warren married his second wife, Mary Smith Mills, with whom he had three more children:

Warren died at his Buffalo home on December 17, 1886. He was buried in Forest Lawn Cemetery.

Party political offices
Preceded by B. Platt Carpenter	Chairman of the New York Republican State Committee; 1883–1884	Succeeded by Chester S. Cole
