= Edward Grosse =

Edward Grosse (January 16, 1845 – February 1, 1897) was a German-American journalist, lawyer, and politician from New York City.

== Life ==
Grosse was born on January 16, 1845, in Dresden, the Kingdom of Saxony, the son of Fredrick and Mary Grosse.

Grosse had a common school education, after which he spent five years as an apprentice in the printing trade and a year as a journeyman. He then worked as private secretary and stenographer for zoologist Alfred Brehm. He held that position for three years, accompanying Brehm on an expedition to the North Sea on behalf of the Berlin Aquarium. He also contributed to various periodicals during that time. He immigrated to America in 1869 and settled in New York City, where he initially worked as a printer. He then became a reporter for the German daily Arbeiter Union, and from 1872 to 1873 he was city editor of the Republican daily Oestliche Post. When the latter paper ended he worked as an editor for the New Yorker Presse and the New Yorker Staats-Zeitung.

During that time, Grosse began a clerkship in the law office of Henry Wahla, studying law in the day while working as an editor at night. He ultimately dropped his journalistic work and devoted himself full-time to studying the law, getting admitted to the bar in 1878. He then began working as a lawyer in New York City, with a law office at 25 Avenue A. In 1879, he was elected to the New York State Assembly as a Republican, representing the New York County 10th District. He served in the Assembly in 1880. A political independent, he wrote and advocated for bills to reduce New York City's elevated railway fare to five cents and to abolish cigar manufacturing in tenement houses.

In 1881, Grosse unsuccessfully ran again for the Assembly in the 10th District as an Independent Republican, losing to Republican candidate John C. Niglutsch. In 1888, he was appointed Deputy Assistant District Attorney under John R. Fellows. He resigned from the position in 1891 and returned to his private law practice at the Potter Building. In March 1894, President Grover Cleveland appointed him Collector of Internal Revenue for the Third District. The Senate confirmed the appointment in August 1894.

Despite Grosse's earlier allegiance to the Republican Party, by the end of his life he became among the best known German-American Democrats in New York City. An active political organizer, he was secretary of the German-American Cleveland Union during the 1892 United States presidential election. He was also a member of the German Press Club, the New York Press Club, the Beethnoven Maennerchor, and the German-American Reform Union.

Grosse died at home from heart disease on February 1, 1897. His funeral was held at the Beethoven Maennerchor, with floral arrangements provided by the German-American Reform Union, the Third District Internal Revenue office, and the Sheriff's office. Sheriff Edward J. H. Tamsen, Augustine A. Costello, Beethoven Maennerchor president John W. Fleck, and Dr. John Friedrich of the German Press Club spoke at the funeral, with Sheriff Tamsen delivering a eulogy in German. He was cremated at Fresh Pond Crematory.

New York State Assembly
Preceded by Ferdinand Eidman	New York State Assembly; New York County, 10th District; 1880	Succeeded by Charles E. Brehm
