= James H. Loomis =

American politician

James Hervey Loomis (June 4, 1823, Attica, Wyoming County, New York – November 3, 1914, Boonton, Morris County, New Jersey) was an American merchant, banker and politician from New York.

== Life ==
He was the son of Timothy Loomis and Sophronia (Collar) Loomis. He attended the common schools and Attica Academy. Then he engaged in the tanning and shoe business. On October 14, 1845, he married Janette Howe. In 1852, he opened a hardware store, and later also engaged in banking. On April 25, 1860, he married Harriet Ellinwood.

He was Supervisor of the Town of Attica for some time, and Assessor of Internal Revenue from 1869 to 1871.

He was a member of the New York State Senate (30th D.) from 1878 to 1881, sitting in the 101st, 102nd, 103rd and 104th New York State Legislatures.

He was buried at the Forest Hill Cemetery in Attica.

== Sources ==
- Civil List and Constitutional History of the Colony and State of New York compiled by Edgar Albert Werner (1884; pg. 291)
- The State Government for 1879 by Charles G. Shanks (Weed, Parsons & Co, Albany NY, 1879; pg. 70)
- JAMES H. LOOMIS DEAD In NYT on November 4, 1914

New York State Senate
Preceded by Abijah J. Wellman	New York State Senate; 30th District; 1878–1881	Succeeded by Timothy E. Ellsworth
