= Daniel W. Tallmadge =

American politician

Member of the New York State Assembly from the 9th district
- In office 1879–1880
- Preceded by: John H. Bergen
- Succeeded by: Charles Hazen Russell

Personal details
- Born: February 5, 1842 Malta, New York
- Died: November 14, 1894 (aged 52) Bensonhurst, Brooklyn, New York
- Party: Republican
- Occupation: Lawyer, civil servant, and politician

Daniel W. Tallmadge (February 5, 1842 – November 14, 1894) was an American attorney and politician from New York.

== Life ==
He was born on February 5, 1842, in Malta, New York, Saratoga County, New York.

He received his education at the public schools of Ballston, New York and at the Ballston Spa Institute. At the age of 18, he went to New York and was employed in a music publishing house. Three years afterward, in 1863, he entered into business with his father under the firm name Tallmadge & Son, the house conducting a large and extended business in nearly all parts of the Union.

In 1877, he was appointed to the Bureau of Assessments to the Tax Office and held that position until he took his seat in the Assembly. He was a member of the New York State Assembly (9th D.) in 1879 and 1880. His entrance into political service was undertaken from a desire mainly to effect some reform in the management of the Kings County charities system, and especially in that of the Lunatic Asylum.

During the Beecher-Tilton investigation, he was a member of the examining committee and clerk of the board.

Tallmadge is largely remembered for taking a libel suit to The New York World newspaper for a story written by pioneering female journalist Nellie Bly, which implicated him in a vote-buying scandal. Tallmadge cleared his name and won the suit to the tune of $20,000.

A descendant of Col. Benjamin Tallmadge, who was a Revolutionary soldier of distinction, and a Member of Congress for sixteen years, of James Tallmadge, Lieutenant-Governor of the State of New York in 1825, and of the Recorder of New York City, Frederick A. Tallmadge.

== Sources ==
New York State Senate
Preceded by John H. Bergen	New York State Assembly; 9th District; 1879–1880	Succeeded by Charles Hazen Russell
