= Edward Hogan (New York politician) =

American politician

Edward Hogan (November 6, 1834 in New York City – January 14, 1905 in Manhattan, NYC) was an American politician from New York.

== Life ==
He attended the public schools. He was Police Justice of the First District from 1864 to 1873.

He was a member of the New York State Senate from 1878 to 1881, sitting in the 101st, 102nd (both 4th D.), 103rd and 104th New York State Legislatures (both 5th D.).

He was a City Magistrate from 1899 until his death. He died at his residence at 325 West 101st Street, in Manhattan, on January 14, 1905, of pneumonia.

== Sources ==
- Civil List and Constitutional History of the Colony and State of New York compiled by Edgar Albert Werner (1884; pg. 290)
- The State Government for 1879 by Charles G. Shanks (Weed, Parsons & Co, Albany NY, 1879; pg. 50)
- Vote for Police Justice in NYT on December 3, 1863
- VACANCIES IN CITY COURTS in NYT on June 4, 1899
- MAGISTRATE HOGAN DEAD in NYT on January 15, 1905

New York State Senate
| Preceded by John Morrissey | New York State Senate; 4th District; 1878–1879 | Succeeded by John C. Jacobs |
| Preceded by Alfred Wagstaff Jr. | New York State Senate; 5th District; 1880–1881 | Succeeded by John G. Boyd |
