= Isaac V. Baker Jr. =

American politician

Isaac Volney Baker Jr.

New York Superintendent of State Prisons
- In office 1882–1887
- Preceded by: Louis D. Pilsbury
- Succeeded by: Austin Lathrop

Member of the New York State Assembly from the Washington County, 2nd district
- In office January 1, 1869 – December 31, 1871
- Preceded by: Nathaniel Daily
- Succeeded by: George W. L. Smith

Member of the New York State Assembly from the Washington County, 2nd district
- In office January 1, 1877 – December 31, 1877
- Preceded by: Henry G. Burleigh
- Succeeded by: George L. Terry

Member of the New York Senate from the 12th district
- In office January 1, 1872 – December 31, 1873
- Preceded by: Francis S. Thayer
- Succeeded by: Roswell A. Parmenter

Member of the New York Senate from the 16th district
- In office January 1, 1880 – December 31, 1881
- Preceded by: William W. Rockwell
- Succeeded by: Charles L. MacArthur

Personal details
- Born: August 15, 1843 Fort Ann, New York
- Died: December 14, 1912 (aged 69) Hudson Falls, New York
- Cause of death: Pneumonia
- Spouse: Laura Demis Clark (m. 1865)
- Parents: Isaac V. Baker (father); Laura Daley Comstock (mother)
- Education: North Granville Academy; Brooklyn Polytechnic and Collegiate Institute

Isaac Volney Baker Jr. (August 15, 1843, Comstock's Landing, Fort Ann, Washington County, New York – December 14, 1912 Hudson Falls, Washington Co., NY) was an American politician from New York.

== Life ==
He was the son of Isaac V. Baker (1813–1894) and Laura Daley (Comstock) Baker (1819–1877). He attended North Granville Academy, and Brooklyn Polytechnic and Collegiate Institute. Then he engaged in mercantile and agricultural pursuits, especially in breeding Merino sheep.

On September 14, 1865, he married Laura Demis Clark (1844–1930), and they had several children.

He was a member of the New York State Assembly (Washington Co., 2nd D.) in 1869, 1870 and 1871; of the New York State Senate (12th D.) in 1872 and 1873; again of the State Assembly in 1877; and again of the State Senate (16th D.) in 1880 and 1881.

He was New York Superintendent of State Prisons from 1882 to 1887. He was New York State Railroad Commissioner from 1887 to 1892.

He died of pneumonia on December 14, 1912, in Hudson Falls, New York, at age 69.

He was buried at the Baker Cemetery in Fort Ann.

== Sources ==
- Hough, Franklin Benjamin; Hutchins, Stephen C.; Werner, Edgar Albert (1870). The New York Civil List. pp. 511, 513.
- "The State Prisons" (PDF). New York Times. March 26, 1882.
- "Tricky Governor Hill" (PDF). New York Times. April 21, 1887.

New York State Assembly
Preceded by Nathaniel Daily	New York State Assembly; Washington County, 2nd District; 1869–1871	Succeeded by George W. L. Smith
Preceded by Henry G. Burleigh	New York State Assembly; Washington County, 2nd District; 1877	Succeeded by George L. Terry
New York State Senate
Preceded by Francis S. Thayer	New York State Senate; 12th District; 1872–1873	Succeeded by Roswell A. Parmenter
Preceded by William W. Rockwell	New York State Senate; 16th District; 1880–1881	Succeeded by Charles L. MacArthur
Government offices
Preceded by Louis D. Pilsbury	New York Superintendent of State Prisons; 1882–1887	Succeeded by Austin Lathrop
