= Stephen H. Wendover =

American politician

Stephen Henry Wendover
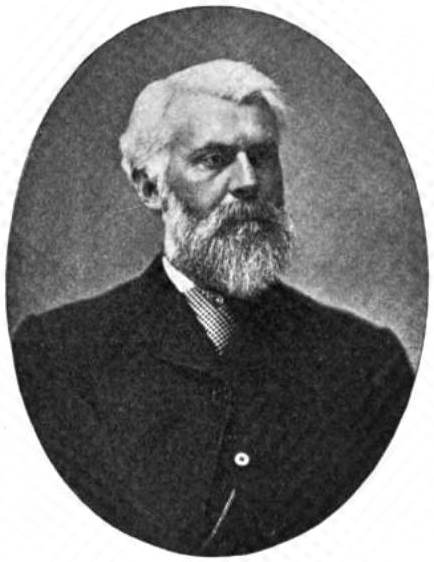
- Born: July 28, 1831; Stuyvesant, New York
- Died: March 16, 1889 (aged 57); Stuyvesant, New York

Stephen Henry Wendover (July 28, 1831 – March 16, 1889) was an American politician from New York. He was a member of the New York State Senate from 1878 to 1881.

== Biography ==
Stephen Henry Wendover was born in July 1831 in Stuyvesant, New York, to John Thompson Wendover (1800–1875) and Cynthia A. Van Slyck. (Note: Samuel R. Harlow and H. H. Boone state July 28, 1831 which gives an age of 57 years, 7 months, and 18 days. Charles G. Shanks states July 23, 1831. These two "Red Books" were published while Wendover was sitting in the Legislature, with info supplied by the members to the authors. The New York Times wrote that he died "in the fifty-eighth year of his age", but states no date. The Chatham Republican wrote in his obituary that "He was 59 years of age" without stating a date. The New York Genealogical and Biographical Record gives July 29, 1830 which gives an age of 58 years, 7 months, and 17 days. When his information was recorded for the American Civil War draft in 1863 he was asked what his age will be on July 1, 1863, and it was recorded as 31. This has him born in 1831. His tombstone lists 1830 as his year of birth.) His brother was Isaac Hutton Wendover (1833–1855).

Wendover attended the common schools and Kinderhook Academy. Following completion of his education, Wendover went to work in the commission and forwarding business, and later in farming. In 1853, he began to work at the National Union Bank of Kinderhook. On January 4, 1865, during the American Civil War, he was appointed to a committee to recruit men from Stuyvesant, New York.

By 1878 Wendover was a director of the National Union Bank of Kinderhook. Wendover was elected President of the bank in January 1879, to succeed William H. Tobey who had died in May 1878, and remained on this post until his own death. On May 13, 1880 a fire swept through the village of Stuyvesant; the destroyed properties included a residence owned by Wendover.

Wendover's tombstone

Wendover never married and he died on March 16, 1889, in Stuyvesant, New York, of Bright's disease. He was buried at the Mountain Home Cemetery in Kalamazoo, Michigan.

== Political career ==
Wendover was initially a member of the Whig Party but later joined the Republican Party when it was formed.

Wendover was a member of the New York State Assembly (Columbia Co., 2nd D.) in 1867 and 1868. He won his first election in November 1866 with a majority of 72. In 1867 he served on the committee of commerce and navigation as it investigated complaints about the ferry companies operating in the East River and North River of New York City. In 1868, he served on the Assembly Committee on Trade and Manufactures.

He was elected to the New York State Senate in 1877 with a majority of 1,684 over the Democratic candidate, Charles Wheaton. He was a member of the Senate from 1878 to 1881, sitting in the 101st, 102nd (both 11th D.), 103rd and 104th New York State Legislatures (both 15th D.). In 1878, he was appointed to the Senate committees on Railroads, Insurance, Banks and Grievances.

== Notes ==
New York State Assembly
Preceded by John W. Van Valkenburgh	New York State Assembly; Columbia County, 2nd District; 1867–1868	Succeeded by Moses Y. Tilden
New York State Senate
Preceded by B. Platt Carpenter	New York State Senate; 11th District; 1878–1879	Succeeded by George H. Forster
Preceded by Webster Wagner	New York State Senate; 15th District; 1880–1881	Succeeded by Homer A. Nelson
Business positions
Preceded by William Henry Tobey	Director, National Union Bank of Kinderhook; 1879–1889	Succeeded by James Bain
