= Charles H. Russell (Brooklyn) =

American politician (1845–1912)

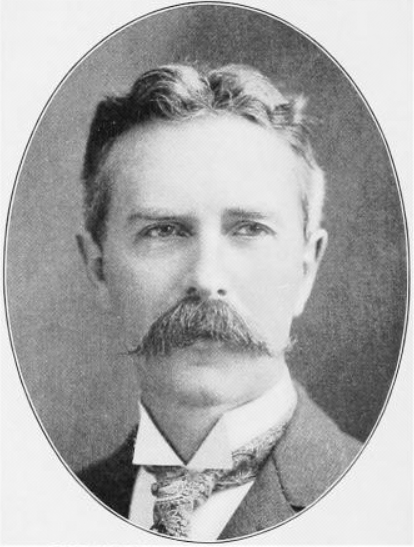

Member of the New York State Senate
- In office 1882–1883

Member of the New York State Assembly
- In office 1880–1881

Personal details
- Born: Charles Hazen Russell; July 11, 1845 Canton, New York, US
- Died: March 14, 1912 (aged 66) Manhattan, New York, US
- Resting place: Green-Wood Cemetery
- Party: Republican
- Spouses: Stella Goodrich (m. 1878; died 1901) Annah Ayres Linquist (m. 1906)
- Education: St. Lawrence University
- Occupation: Lawyer, politician
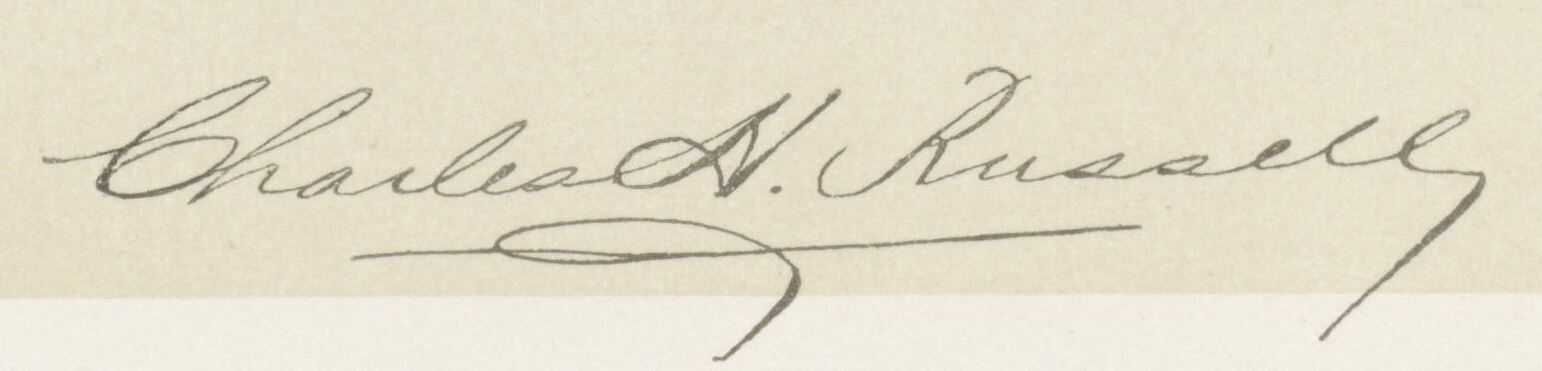
- Signature

Charles Hazen Russell (July 11, 1845 – March 14, 1912) was an American lawyer and politician from New York.

== Life ==
Charles H. Russell was born in Canton, New York on July 11, 1845, the son of Thomas Victor Russell (1817–1893) and Lucia Lavilla (Conkey) Russell. He attended Canton Academy and St. Lawrence University. Then he studied law in Philadelphia, was admitted to the bar 1877, and practiced in Brooklyn. On January 30, 1878, he married Stella Goodrich (1854–1901). She died on February 12, 1901.

He was a member of the New York State Assembly (Kings Co., 9th D.) in 1880 and 1881.

He was a member of the New York State Senate (3rd D.) in 1882 and 1883.

He was a presidential elector in 1900, voting for William McKinley and Theodore Roosevelt.

In 1906, he remarried to Annah Ayres Linquist.

Russell died at his home in Manhattan on March 14, 1912, and was buried at the Green-Wood Cemetery in Brooklyn.

New York Attorney General Leslie W. Russell (1840–1903) was his first cousin. Rev. Samuel Russell (1660–1731) was his great-great-great-grandfather.

== Sources ==
New York State Assembly
Preceded by Daniel W. Tallmadge	New York State Assembly; Kings County, 9th District; 1880–1881	Succeeded by James W. Monk
New York State Senate
Preceded by Frederick A. Schroeder	New York State Senate; 3rd District; 1882–1883	Succeeded by Albert Daggett
