= Philip Wissig =

American politician

Philip Wissig (March 28, 1848 – October 28, 1921) was a German-American hatter, saloon keeper and politician from New York.

== Life ==
Wissig was born on March 28, 1848, in Cologne, Rhine Province, Kingdom of Prussia. He immigrated to America in about 1868.

Wissig initially worked as a silk hatter in New York City. He served as president of the Hatters' Association for eight years. He later established a liquor saloon on 74 Stanton Street. During the Lexow Committee, it was revealed that a brothel keeper was renting the building from him and he had corrupt ties with the police.

In 1887, Wissig was elected to the New York State Assembly as a Democrat, representing the New York County 8th District. He served in the Assembly in 1888, 1890, and 1892. In the 1892 session, when the Assembly was voting for women's suffrage, Wissig spoke against it so vehemently and vulgarly, the Assembly quickly voted to expunge all record of the speech. The suffrage bill passed the Assembly 69-34, partially as a reaction to Wissig's speech. In response to the speech, Tammany Hall forced him to retire from his Tammany leadership position.

Wissig died in Lincoln Hospital from stomach cancer on October 28, 1921.

New York State Assembly
Preceded by Charles Smith (New York City)	New York State Assembly; New York County, 8th District; 1888	Succeeded by Charles Smith (New York City)
Preceded by Charles Smith (New York City)	New York State Assembly; New York County, 8th District; 1890	Succeeded by John E. Brodsky
Preceded by John E. Brodsky	New York State Assembly; New York County, 8th District; 1892	Succeeded by William H. Walker (New York City)
