= James Stevens (New York politician) =

American politician

President of the Village of Rome, New York
- In office 1867–1868
- Preceded by: George Barnard Jr.
- Succeeded by: Edward L. Stevens

Member of the New York State Assembly for Oneida County, 3rd District
- In office 1868–1869
- Preceded by: George H. Sanford
- Succeeded by: St. Pierre Jerred

Member of the New York State Senate for the 22nd District
- In office 1880–1881
- Preceded by: Dennis McCarthy
- Succeeded by: Robert H. Roberts

Mayor of Rome, New York
- In office 1887–1891
- Preceded by: Frederick E. Mitchell
- Succeeded by: E. Stuart Williams

Personal details
- Born: May 9, 1836 Rome, Oneida County, New York
- Died: June 14, 1912 (aged 76)
- Resting place: Rome Cemetery
- Party: Democratic
- Occupation: Politician

James Stevens (May 9, 1836 in Rome, Oneida County, New York – June 14, 1912) was an American politician from New York.

== Life ==
He was the son of Samuel B. Stevens (1805–1884) and Elizabeth (Tibbits) Stevens (1810–1896). He engaged in the forwarding business.

He was President of the Village of Rome from 1867 to 1868; a member of the New York State Assembly (Oneida Co., 3rd D.) in 1868 and 1869; a member of the New York State Senate (22nd D.) in 1880 and 1881; and Mayor of Rome from 1887 to 1891.

He died on June 14, 1912, and was buried at the Rome Cemetery.

== See also ==
- List of mayors of Rome, New York

== Sources ==
- Civil List and Constitutional History of the Colony and State of New York compiled by Edgar Albert Werner (1884; pg. 291 and 370)
- Life Sketches of the State Officers, Senators, and Members of the Assembly of the State of New York in 1868 by S. R. Harlow & S. C. Hutchins (pg. 359)
- Oneida County history
- List of Mayors at Rome NY official website
- Rome Cemetery transcriptions

New York State Assembly
Preceded by George H. Sanford	New York State Assembly; Oneida County, 3rd District; 1868–1869	Succeeded by St. Pierre Jerred
New York State Senate
Preceded by Dennis McCarthy	New York State Senate; 22nd District; 1880–1881	Succeeded by Robert H. Roberts
