= William H. Walker (New York City politician) =

American politician

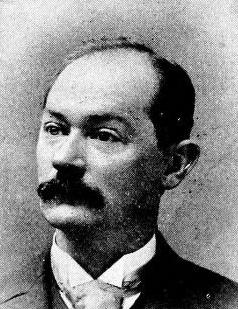
William H. Walker (1893)

William Henry Walker (January 1842 in Castlecomer, County Kilkenny, Ireland – May 15, 1916 in Manhattan, New York City) was an American politician in New York.

== Life ==
Descended from a Roman Catholic family who had emigrated from Yorkshire in the late 1700s to Castlecomer, County Kilkenny, Ireland, Walker attended the public schools in Dublin. One brother, John (1832–1901) was an architect and had been arrested in England for his Fenian activities in 1869. In 1870, before the death of his parents, John Walker (1797-1879) and Anne Dooley Walker (1799-1873), he emigrated to the United States and settled in New York City. He started as a carpenter - cabinetmaker and became a contractor, builder, and owner of a lumberyard; and entered politics as a Democrat. He married Ellen Ida Roon (Oct 1857 – Aug 19, 1917), daughter of an Irish American New York politician, James E. Roon (1828 – Dec 7, 1890).

He was a member of the Board of Aldermen from 1887 to 1890; and a member of the New York State Assembly in 1892 (New York Co., 9th D.) and 1893 (New York Co., 8th D.).

In 1902, he was appointed by Manhattan Borough President Jacob A. Cantor as Superintendent of Public Buildings. In 1907, he was removed from office by Borough President John F. Ahearn, but was re-instated by order of the New York Supreme Court in 1909.

He died on May 15, 1916, in the home which he built at 6 St. Luke's Place in Manhattan; and was buried in the Roon – Walker family plot at Calvary Cemetery in Queens.

His children were Dr. William H. Walker Jr (1879–1946), New York Mayor James John "Jimmy" Walker (1881–1946), George Francis Walker (1883–1932), and Anna Gertrude "Nan" Walker (1886–1962) (who married Luke A. Burke Jr, engineer and building contractor, 1885–1925).

== Sources ==
- "Castlecomer Connections, Exploring History Geography and Social Evolution in North Kilkenny Environs", by Tom Lyng, 1984, Wellbrook Press Ltd., Freshford, Co. Kilkenny, Ireland.
- 1880 U.S. Census for New York, page 2, Supervisor's District 1, Enumeration District 217. (Walker's age given as 38)
- New York State Legislative Souvenir for 1893 by Henry P. Phelps (pg. 63f)
- AHEARN REMOVES 3 BUREAU HEADS in NYT on May 16, 1907
- WILLIAM H. WALKER DEAD in NYT on May 16, 1916

New York State Assembly
Preceded by Wright Holcomb	New York State Assembly; New York County, 9th District; 1892	Succeeded by Walter W. Bahan
Preceded by Philip Wissig	New York State Assembly; New York County, 8th District; 1893	Succeeded by Thomas J. O'Donnell
