= Patrick W. Cullinan =

American politician

Patrick William Cullinan (June 26, 1851 – July 29, 1926) was an American lawyer and politician from New York.

== Life ==
Cullinan was born on June 26, 1851, in Oswego, New York. He was of Irish and Anglo-Irish parentage. He graduated from Oswego High School in 1869.

Cullinan entered Cornell University in 1869. He was the first president of the Cornell Baseball Team and was the class orator at his graduation in 1872. He then studied law and practiced in Oswego after he was admitted to the bar in 1875.

Cullinan was Oswego City Attorney from 1877 to 1878. In 1879, he was elected to the New York State Assembly as a Republican, representing the Oswego County 1st District. He served in the Assembly in 1880 and 1881.

While in the Assembly, Cullinan was involved in the struggle to elect new Senators following the resignation of Roscoe Conkling and Thomas C. Platt, with Cullinan supporting both men being returned to the Senate. He was also chairman of the Assembly Committee on General Laws and focused on codifying the state's general laws regarding corporations. In 1893, he was Chairman of the Republican State Convention. In 1896, when the State Excise Department was organized, he was appointed its General Counsel. He prepared the forms and blanks for the department, formulated legal methods to enforce the Liquor Tax Law, and secured a harmonious line of judicial decisions throughout the state. After Commissioner Henry H. Lyman died in 1901, Cullinan was appointed his replacement.

Cullinan served as Excise Commissioner until 1906. He was a delegate-at-large to the 1915 New York State Constitutional Convention. Following his retirement as Excise Commissioner, he formed a law partnership with Udelle Bartlett called Cullinan & Bartlett.

He organized the New York State Waterways Association and served as its first president from 1909 to 1910. He was an alternate delegate to the 1900, 1912, and 1920 Republican National Conventions and a delegate to the 1904 Republican National Convention.

Cullinan was a member of Alpha Delta Phi. In 1896, he married Katherine Washburn.

Cullinan died at home from apoplexy on July 29, 1926. He was buried in Riverside Cemetery.

New York State Assembly
Preceded by George B. Sloan	New York State Assembly; Oswego County, 1st District; 1880–1881	Succeeded by William A. Poucher
