= George H. Forster =

American politician (1838–1888)

George Henry Forster (June 20, 1838 – November 8, 1888) was an American lawyer and politician from New York. He was a member of the New York State Assembly and the New York State Senate.

== Early life ==
Forster was born on June 20, 1838, in Charlestown, now a part of Boston, Massachusetts. His parents were Henry Forster and Mary Taber (Swift) Forster. He received his early edition in the public schools of Charlestown.

Forster graduated from Harvard University with distinguished honors in 1857. He then worked for a railroad company and studied law for four years.

== Career ==
Forster was admitted to the bar in 1861 and practiced law in New York City. He eventually became a partner with the law firm renamed as Weeks, DeForest & Forster. His office was located at 58 Wall Street.

In 1874, he was an unsuccessful Republican candidate for Alderman at Large of New York City. Forster was elected to the New York State Assembly (Westchester Co., 1st D.) in 1876. In 1879, he was elected to the New York State Senate (11th D.), serving in 1880 and 1881. In 1881, he was an unsuccessful candidate for the district attorney of New York County.

In 1882, he left the Republican Party and joined Tammany Hall, with whom he was a local leader for the party. He ran for district attorney in 1884, but lost again. He was elected president of the Board of Aldermen of New York City in 1888 and died two days after his re-election.

== Personal life ==
In 1867, Forster married Constance Atherton, the daughter of Henry L. Atherton. They lived in Riverdale, which was then an area in the Town of Kingsbridge, in Westchester County. The area was annexed by New York City in 1874. The couple had two sons, including Henry Atherton Forster (1868-1932), who was a successful lawyer and historian from New York City.

Forster died of typhoid fever on November 8, 1888, at his home in Riverdale.

New York State Assembly
Preceded by Dennis R. Shiel	New York State Assembly; Westchester Co., 1st District; 1876	Succeeded by Ambrose H. Purdy
New York State Senate
Preceded by Stephen H. Wendover	New York State Senate; 11th District; 1880–1881	Succeeded by Frank P. Treanor
