= David H. Evans =

American politician

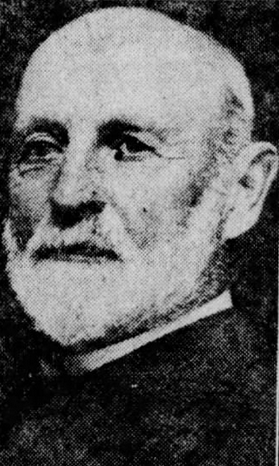

Member of the New York State Senate
- In office 1882–1883
- Preceded by: William B. Woodin
- Succeeded by: Edward S. Esty
- Constituency: 26th District

Member of the New York State Assembly
- In office 1879–1880
- Preceded by: Diedrich Willers Jr.
- Succeeded by: Samuel R. Welles
- Constituency: Seneca County

Personal details
- Born: December 7, 1837 Tyre, New York
- Died: February 24, 1920 (aged 82) Tyre, New York
- Party: Republican
- Spouse: Catherine (Stephens) Ransom (m. 1893)
- Occupation: Politician

David H. Evans (December 7, 1837 – February 24, 1920) was an American politician from New York.

== Life ==
Evans was born in Tyre, Seneca County, New York, the son of John G. Evans (1793–1877), and Mary (Hess) Evans (died 1875). He attended the common schools and Fort Plain Seminary. Then he taught school for some time, and worked on the family farm. On February 24, 1864, he married Catherine Wurts (1840–1885), and they had five children.

In politics, he was a Republican. He was a Justice of the Peace from 1866 to 1869; and Supervisor of the Town of Tyre in 1869, and from 1872 to 1877.

He was a member of the New York State Assembly (Seneca Co.) in 1879 and 1880.

He was a member of the New York State Senate (26th D.) in 1882 and 1883.

In 1893, he married Catherine (Stephens) Ransom.

He died on February 24, 1920, at the farm where he was born, located in the Town of Tyre, about four miles south-west of the Village of Savannah; and was buried at the Evans Corner Cemetery in Tyre.

New York State Assembly
Preceded by Diedrich Willers, Jr.	New York State Assembly; Seneca County; 1879–1880	Succeeded by Samuel R. Welles
New York State Senate
Preceded by William B. Woodin	New York State Senate; 26th District; 1882–1883	Succeeded by Edward S. Esty
