= Wright Holcomb =

American politician

Wright Holcomb (December 8, 1843 – March 27, 1896) was an American lawyer and politician from New York.

== Life ==
Holcomb was born on December 8, 1843, in Willsboro, New York, the son of merchant D. S. Holcomb. His namesake and father's cousin was New York Governor Silas Wright. His mother, a Cole, was a descendant of Plymouth Colony Governor William Bradford.

Holcomb attended the academy in Champlain. He began attending Dartmouth College in the fall of 1860, although he left in the summer of 1861. In 1863, he began studying law in Plattsburgh in the office of Judge Peter S. Palmer and Smith M. Weed. He was admitted to the bar in 1866, at which point he began practicing law in Plattsburgh for the next year. He also studied law in Albany Law School and was affiliated with Union College's class of 1866.

In 1867, Holcomb moved to New York City, where he was managing clerk in the office of corporation counsel John E. Delvin. He then returned to Plattsburgh and formed a partnership with Palmer & Weed, renamed Palmer, Weed & Holcomb. In 1875, he moved back to New York City and joined the law firm Matthew, Husted & Folly. After the firm was dissolved in 1878, he practiced alone until he organized a new firm known as Holcomb, Fitzgerald & Condon. After that firm was dissolved in 1891, he formed a new partnership with Daniel F. Martin. He later became senior member of the law firm Holcomb, Martin & Weil, which had offices at 49-51 Chambers Street.

In 1890, Holcomb was elected to the New York State Assembly as a Democrat, representing the New York County 9th District. He served in the Assembly in 1891. In the Assembly, he was chairman of a special committee on enumeration and apportionment, which investigated the recent federal census in New York City. He was a Tammany Democrat. He was a delegate to the 1894 New York State Constitutional Convention.

Holcomb was a Catholic. In 1868, he married Elizabeth Vilas of Ogdensburg. They had a son, Charles Spencer.

Holcomb died in St. Vincent's Hospital from Bright's disease on March 27, 1896. He was buried in Westport.

New York State Assembly
Preceded by John Martin	New York State Assembly; New York County, 9th District; 1891	Succeeded by William H. Walker
