= Roswell A. Parmenter =

American politician

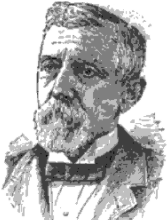
- Born: September 20, 1821; Pittstown, New York, U.S.
- Died: February 1, 1904 (aged 82); Troy, New York, U.S.
- Political party: Democratic
- Parent(s): Azel Fiske Parmenter; Lavina Ray

Roswell A. Parmenter (September 20, 1821 – February 1, 1904) was an American lawyer and politician from New York.

== Life ==
Roswell A. Parmenter was born in Pittstown, New York, on September 20, 1821, the son of Dr. Azel Fiske Parmenter (born 1786) and Lavina (Ray) Parmenter. He studied law, was admitted to the bar, and practiced in Troy.

Parmenter was City Attorney of Troy from 1853 to 1854, and from 1871 to 1883.

Parmenter was a member of the New York State Senate (12th D.) in 1874 and 1875.

At the New York state election, 1881, he ran on the Democratic ticket for New York Attorney General, but was defeated by Republican Leslie W. Russell.

Parmenter was Corporation Counsel of Troy from 1886 to 1890.

Parmenter died in Troy on February 1, 1904, at the age of 82.

== Sources ==
- Life Sketches of Government Officers and Members of the Legislature of the State of New York in 1875 by W. H. McElroy and Alexander McBride (pg. 93ff) [e-book]
- Courts and Lawyers of New York: A History, 1609-1925 by Alden Chester & Edwin Melvin Williams (Vol. I; pg. 1065)

New York State Senate
Preceded by Isaac V. Baker Jr.	New York State Senate; 12th District; 1874–1875	Succeeded by Thomas Coleman
