= Joseph F. Scott (New York official) =

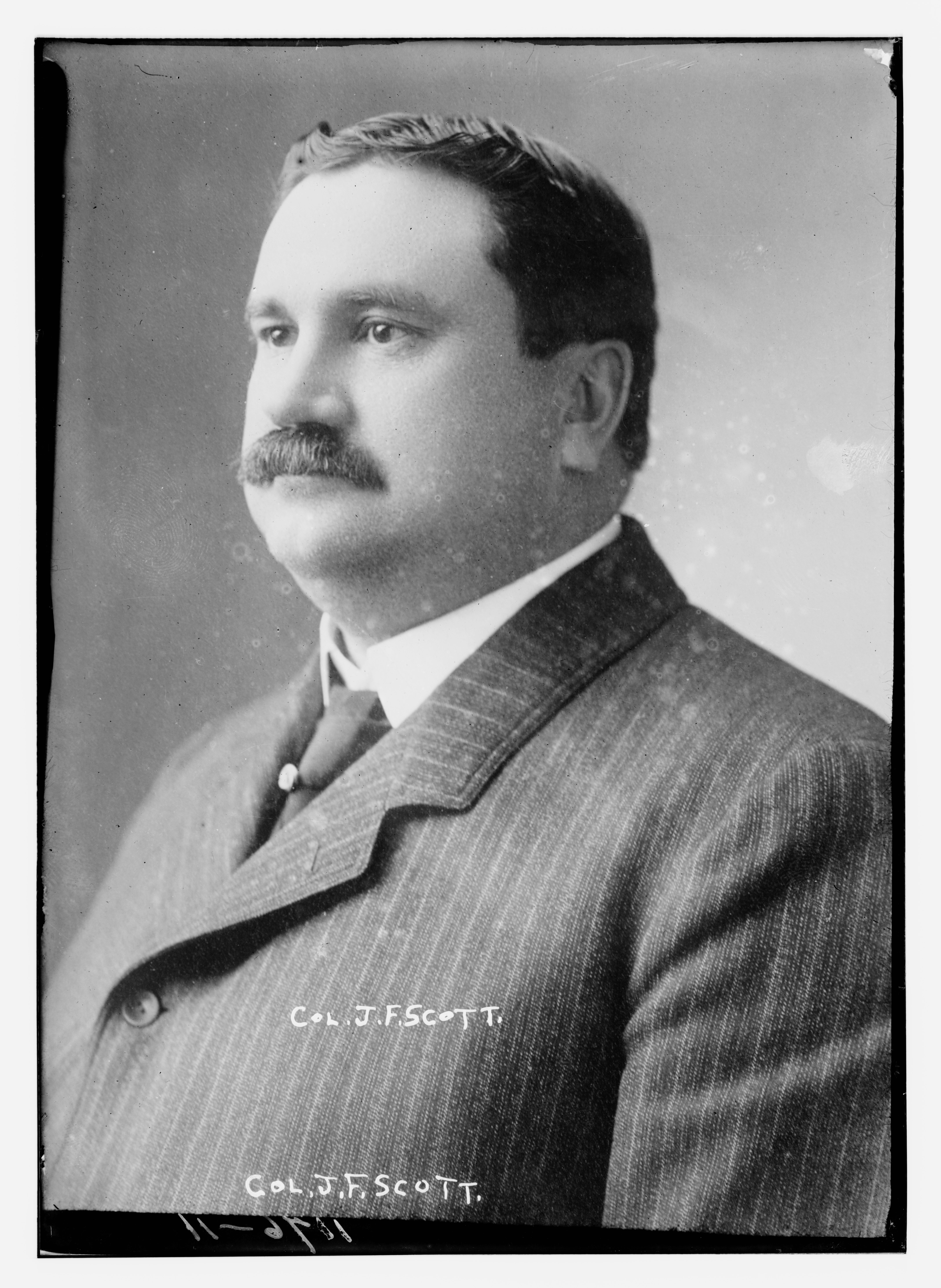
Col. Joseph F. Scott

Colonel Joseph F. Scott (1860 – December 7, 1918) was the New York Superintendent of State Prisons until 1913. He was president of the National Prison Association.

== Biography ==
He was born in 1860 in Craftsbury, Vermont. He attended the State Normal School in Johnstown, Vermont. He served as the superintendent of the Elmira Reformatory starting in 1900 when he replaced Frank W. Robertson. The same year he was elected as the president of the National Prison Association.

He was appointed the New York Superintendent of State Prisons until he was forced out of office by governor William Sulzer in 1913 on charges of non feasance and neglect of duty. He was replaced by John B. Riley.

He died on December 7, 1918, in Denver, Colorado.
