= 103rd New York State Legislature =

New York state legislative session

| ← | 102nd | 104th | → |
- New York State Capitol (2009)

Overview
- Legislative body: New York State Legislature
- Jurisdiction: New York, United States
- Term: January 1 – December 31, 1880

Senate
- Members: 32
- President: Lt. Gov. George G. Hoskins (R)
- Temporary President: William H. Robertson (R)
- Party control: Republican (25-7)

Assembly
- Members: 128
- Speaker: George H. Sharpe (R)
- Party control: Republican (93-35)

Sessions
- 1st: January 6 – May 27, 1880

The 103rd New York State Legislature, consisting of the New York State Senate and the New York State Assembly, met from January 6 to May 27, 1880, during the 1st year of Alonzo B. Cornell's governorship, in Albany.

== Background ==
Under the provisions of the New York Constitution of 1846, 32 Senators and 128 assemblymen were elected in single-seat districts; senators for a two-year term, assemblymen for a one-year term. The senatorial districts were made up of entire counties, except New York County (seven districts) and Kings County (three districts). The Assembly districts were made up of entire towns, or city wards, forming a contiguous area, all within the same county.

On April 23, 1879, the Legislature re-apportioned the Senate districts; and the Assembly seats per county. Columbia, Delaware, Madison, Oneida, Ontario and Oswego counties lost one seat each; Kings and New York counties gained three seats each.

At this time there were two major political parties: the Republican Party and the Democratic Party. Tammany Hall Boss John Kelly engaged in a fierce struggle against the Democratic majority led by Samuel J. Tilden and Lucius Robinson, and ran as a "spoiler candidate" to defeat Gov. Robinson who ran for re-election.

The Prohibition Party, the Greenback Party, the Socialist Labor Party of America, the "Working Men" and the "Jeffersonian Democrats" also nominated tickets.

== Elections ==
The 1879 New York state election was held on November 4. Republicans Alonzo B. Cornell and George G. Hoskins were elected Governor and Lieutenant Governor. Of the other five statewide elective office up for election, four were carried by the Republicans, and one by a Democrat. The approximate party strength at this election, as expressed by the vote for Governor, was: Republican 419,000; Democratic 376,000; Tammany Hall 78,000; Greenback 20,000; and Prohibition 4,500.

== Sessions ==
The Legislature met for the regular session at the State Capitol in Albany on January 6, 1880; and adjourned on May 27.

George H. Sharpe (R) was elected Speaker with 90 votes against 33 for John Shanley (D).

William H. Robertson was re-elected President pro tempore of the State Senate.

On April 6, the Legislature re-elected Superintendent of Public Instruction Neil Gilmour to a third term of three years.

== State Senate ==
=== Districts ===
- 1st District: Queens and Suffolk counties
- 2nd District: 1st, 2nd, 5th, 6th, 8th, 9th, 10th, 12th and 22nd Ward of the City of Brooklyn, and the towns of Flatbush, Gravesend and New Utrecht in Kings County
- 3rd District: 3rd, 4th, 7th, 11th, 13th, 19th, 20th, 21st and 23rd Ward of the City of Brooklyn
- 4th District: 14th, 15th, 16th, 17th, 18th, 24th and 25th Ward of the City of Brooklyn, and the towns of New Lots and Flatlands in Kings County
- 5th District: Richmond County and the 1st, 2nd, 3rd, 5th, 6th, 8th, 14th and parts of the 4th and 9th Ward of New York City
- 6th District: 7th, 11th, 13th and part of the 4th Ward of NYC
- 7th District: 10th, 17th and part of the 15th, 18th and 21st Ward of NYC
- 8th District: 16th and part of the 9th, 15th, 18th, 20th and 21st Ward of NYC
- 9th District: Part of the 18th, 19th and 21st Ward of NYC
- 10th District: Part of the 12th, 19th, 20th, 21st and 22nd Ward of NYC
- 11th District: 23rd and 24th, and part of the 12th, 20th and 22nd Ward of NYC
- 12th District: Rockland and Westchester counties
- 13th District: Orange and Sullivan counties
- 14th District: Greene, Schoharie and Ulster counties
- 15th District: Columbia, Dutchess and Putnam counties
- 16th District: Rensselaer and Washington counties
- 17th District: Albany County
- 18th District: Fulton, Hamilton, Montgomery, Saratoga and Schenectady counties
- 19th District: Clinton, Essex and Warren counties
- 20th District: Franklin, Lewis and St. Lawrence counties
- 21st District: Oswego and Jefferson counties
- 22nd District: Oneida County
- 23rd District: Herkimer, Madison and Otsego counties
- 24th District: Chenango, Delaware and Broome counties
- 25th District: Onondaga and Cortland counties
- 26th District: Cayuga, Seneca, Tompkins and Tioga counties
- 27th District: Allegany, Chemung and Steuben counties
- 28th District: Ontario, Schuyler, Wayne and Yates counties
- 29th District: Monroe and Orleans counties
- 30th District: Genesee, Livingston, Niagara and Wyoming counties
- 31st District: Erie County
- 32nd District: Cattaraugus and Chautauqua counties

Note: There are now 62 counties in the State of New York. The counties which are not mentioned in this list had not yet been established, or sufficiently organized, the area being included in one or more of the abovementioned counties.

=== Members ===
The asterisk (*) denotes members of the previous Legislature who continued in office as members of this Legislature. Jacob Seebacher, Ferdinand Eidman, Robert H. Strahan and Waters W. Braman changed from the Assembly to the Senate.

| District | Senator | Party | Notes |
|---|---|---|---|
| 1st | John Birdsall | Republican | |
| 2nd | William H. Murtha | Democrat | |
| 3rd | Frederick A. Schroeder | Republican | |
| 4th | John C. Jacobs* | Democrat | re-elected |
| 5th | Edward Hogan* | Democrat | re-elected |
| 6th | Jacob Seebacher* | Democrat | |
| 7th | Ferdinand Eidman* | Republican | |
| 8th | Robert H. Strahan* | Republican | unsuccessfully contested by John W. Browning (D) |
| 9th | Francis M. Bixby | Democrat | |
| 10th | William W. Astor | Republican | |
| 11th | George H. Forster | Republican | |
| 12th | William H. Robertson* | Republican | re-elected; re-elected President pro tempore |
| 13th | Edward M. Madden | Republican | |
| 14th | Charles A. Fowler | Democrat | |
| 15th | Stephen H. Wendover* | Republican | re-elected |
| 16th | Isaac V. Baker Jr. | Republican | |
| 17th | Waters W. Braman* | Republican | |
| 18th | Webster Wagner* | Republican | re-elected |
| 19th | William W. Rockwell* | Republican | re-elected |
| 20th | Dolphus S. Lynde* | Republican | re-elected |
| 21st | Bradley Winslow | Republican | |
| 22nd | James Stevens | Democrat | |
| 23rd | Albert M. Mills | Republican | |
| 24th | Edwin G. Halbert* | Republican | re-elected |
| 25th | Dennis McCarthy* | Republican | re-elected |
| 26th | William B. Woodin | Republican | |
| 27th | Ira Davenport* | Republican | re-elected |
| 28th | George P. Lord | Republican | |
| 29th | Edmund L. Pitts | Republican | |
| 30th | James H. Loomis* | Republican | re-elected |
| 31st | Benjamin H. Williams | Republican | |
| 32nd | Loren B. Sessions* | Republican | re-elected; also Supervisor of the Town of Harmony |

=== Employees ===
- Clerk: John W. Vrooman
- Sergeant-at-Arms: John W. Corning
- Doorkeeper: James G. Caw
- Stenographer: Hudson C. Tanner

== State Assembly ==
=== Assemblymen ===
The asterisk (*) denotes members of the previous Legislature who continued as members of this Legislature.

Party affiliations follow the vote for Speaker.

| District | | Assemblymen | Party | Notes |
|---|---|---|---|---|
| Albany | 1st | William H. Slingerland | Republican | |
| Albany | 2nd | Hiram Griggs* | Republican | |
| Albany | 3rd | Ignatius Wiley | Democrat | |
| Albany | 4th | Joseph Hynes | Democrat | contested; seat vacated on March 11 |
| Albany | 4th | Thomas Liddle | Republican | seated on March 11 |
| Allegany | | Samuel H. Morgan | Republican | |
| Broome | | Alexander E. Andrews | Republican | |
| Cattaraugus | 1st | Zenas G. Bullock | Republican | |
| Cattaraugus | 2nd | Joseph M. Congdon | Republican | |
| Cayuga | 1st | Harvey D. Ferris | Republican | |
| Cayuga | 2nd | Hector H. Tuthill | Republican | |
| Chautauqua | 1st | Charles P. Ingersoll* | Republican | |
| Chautauqua | 2nd | Smith Clark | Republican | |
| Chemung | | Henry C. Hoffman | Democrat | |
| Chenango | | Oscar H. Curtis* | Republican | |
| Clinton | | William P. Mooers* | Republican | |
| Columbia | | John Elbert Gillette | Republican | |
| Cortland | | Samuel A. Childs | Republican | |
| Delaware | | Robert Beates | Republican | |
| Dutchess | 1st | Isaac S. Carpenter | Republican | |
| Dutchess | 2nd | Cornelius Pitcher* | Republican | |
| Erie | 1st | Jules O'Brien | Republican | unsuccessfully contested by John McLaughlin |
| Erie | 2nd | Frank Sipp | Republican | |
| Erie | 3rd | James Ash | Republican | |
| Erie | 4th | James A. Roberts* | Republican | |
| Erie | 5th | Harvey J. Hurd* | Republican | |
| Essex | | Warren French Weston* | Republican | |
| Franklin | | William D. Brennan* | Republican | |
| Fulton and Hamilton | | David A. Wells | Republican | |
| Genesee | | John Sanders* | Republican | |
| Greene | | Albert Parker | Democrat | |
| Herkimer | | William D. Gorsline | Republican | |
| Jefferson | 1st | Charles R. Skinner* | Republican | |
| Jefferson | 2nd | John D. Ellis | Democrat | |
| Kings | 1st | John Shanley | Democrat | |
| Kings | 2nd | John McTernan | Democrat | |
| Kings | 3rd | Lawrence J. Tormey | Democrat | |
| Kings | 4th | John M. Clancy* | Democrat | |
| Kings | 5th | Thomas J. Sheridan* | Democrat | |
| Kings | 6th | Patrick J. Tully | Democrat | |
| Kings | 7th | George Wren | Republican | |
| Kings | 8th | David Lindsay | Republican | |
| Kings | 9th | Charles H. Russell | Republican | |
| Kings | 10th | Richard J. Newman | Democrat | |
| Kings | 11th | Daniel W. Tallmadge* | Republican | |
| Kings | 12th | Erastus D. Benedict | Democrat | |
| Lewis | | Charles A. Chickering* | Republican | |
| Livingston | | Archibald Kennedy | Republican | |
| Madison | | Gerrit Smith Miller | Republican | |
| Monroe | 1st | George Le Grand Seeley | Republican | |
| Monroe | 2nd | Charles S. Baker* | Republican | |
| Monroe | 3rd | Frederick P. Root | Republican | |
| Montgomery | | John Warner* | Republican | |
| New York | 1st | James Fitzgerald | Democrat | |
| New York | 2nd | Thomas P. Walsh | Democrat | |
| New York | 3rd | George P. Gibbs | Democrat | |
| New York | 4th | John Henry McCarthy | Democrat | |
| New York | 5th | Warren C. Bennett | Democrat | |
| New York | 6th | Patrick O'Connor | Democrat | |
| New York | 7th | Isaac Israel Hayes* | Republican | |
| New York | 8th | John E. Brodsky | Republican | |
| New York | 9th | George B. Deane, Sr.* | Republican | |
| New York | 10th | Edward Grosse | Republican | |
| New York | 11th | James M. Varnum* | Republican | |
| New York | 12th | Louis Cohen | Democrat | |
| New York | 13th | Charles Holland Duell | Republican | |
| New York | 14th | James J. Costello | Democrat | |
| New York | 15th | Michael J. Dougherty* | Democrat | |
| New York | 16th | Edward P. Hagan* | Democrat | |
| New York | 17th | Frank P. Treanor | Democrat | |
| New York | 18th | William Cushing | Democrat | |
| New York | 19th | Joseph J. McAvoy | Democrat | |
| New York | 20th | Frederick Thilemann Jr. | Democrat | |
| New York | 21st | Edward Mitchell | Republican | |
| New York | 22nd | John T. McDonald | Democrat | |
| New York | 23rd | Nathaniel B. Terpeny | Democrat | |
| New York | 24th | James L. Wells* | Republican | previously a member from Westchester Co. |
| Niagara | 1st | Thomas N. Van Valkenburgh* | Republican | |
| Niagara | 2nd | James Low* | Republican | |
| Oneida | 1st | Henry J. Cookinham | Republican | |
| Oneida | 2nd | James A. Douglass | Republican | |
| Oneida | 3rd | David Gray | Republican | |
| Onondaga | 1st | Thomas G. Alvord* | Republican | |
| Onondaga | 2nd | Albert Howland | Republican | |
| Onondaga | 3rd | Henry L. Duguid* | Republican | |
| Ontario | | Charles R. Case* | Republican | |
| Orange | 1st | Morgan Shuit* | Republican | |
| Orange | 2nd | James E. Waterbury | Republican | |
| Orleans | | Marcus H. Phillips | Republican | |
| Oswego | 1st | Patrick W. Cullinan | Republican | |
| Oswego | 2nd | William H. Steele* | Republican | |
| Otsego | 1st | Azro Chase* | Republican | |
| Otsego | 2nd | Nathan Bridges* | Republican | |
| Putnam | | George McCabe | Republican | |
| Queens | 1st | William J. Youngs* | Republican | |
| Queens | 2nd | B. Valentine Clowes | Republican | |
| Rensselaer | 1st | La Mott W. Rhodes | Democrat | |
| Rensselaer | 2nd | Albert C. Comstock | Republican | |
| Rensselaer | 3rd | Barnis C. Strait | Democrat | |
| Richmond | | Oliver Fiske | Republican | |
| Rockland | | James W. Husted* | Republican | |
| St. Lawrence | 1st | Daniel Peck* | Republican | |
| St. Lawrence | 2nd | Worth Chamberlain | Republican | |
| St. Lawrence | 3rd | Ebenezer S. Crapser | Republican | |
| Saratoga | 1st | Benjamin F. Baker | Republican | |
| Saratoga | 2nd | Delcour S. Potter | Republican | |
| Schenectady | | Arthur D. Mead | Democrat | |
| Schoharie | | Robert Grant Havens | Democrat | |
| Schuyler | | Lewis Beach | Republican | |
| Seneca | | David H. Evans* | Republican | |
| Steuben | 1st | John W. Davis | Republican | |
| Steuben | 2nd | Russell M. Tuttle | Republican | |
| Suffolk | | Everett A. Carpenter | Republican | |
| Sullivan | | Alpheus Potts | Republican | |
| Tioga | | Edward G. Nowlan | Republican | |
| Tompkins | | Charles M. Titus* | Republican | |
| Ulster | 1st | George H. Sharpe* | Republican | elected Speaker |
| Ulster | 2nd | Peter D. Lefever | Republican | |
| Ulster | 3rd | Thomas E. Benedict | Democrat | |
| Warren | | Henry P. Gwinup | Democrat | |
| Washington | 1st | Hiram Sisson | Republican | |
| Washington | 2nd | George L. Terry* | Republican | |
| Wayne | 1st | Alfred P. Crafts | Republican | |
| Wayne | 2nd | Jefferson Sherman* | Republican | |
| Westchester | 1st | David Ogden Bradley* | Republican | |
| Westchester | 2nd | William H. Catlin | Democrat | |
| Westchester | 3rd | David W. Travis* | Republican | |
| Wyoming | | Orange L. Tozier* | Republican | |
| Yates | | Asa P. Fish | Republican | |

=== Employees ===
- Clerk: Edward M. Johnson
- Sergeant-at-Arms: Sidney M. Robinson
- Doorkeeper: Henry Wheeler
- First Assistant Doorkeeper: Michael Maher
- Second Assistant Doorkeeper: John W. Wheeler
- Assistant Doorkeeper: John Christie
- Stenographer: Worden E. Payne

== Sources ==
- Civil List and Constitutional History of the Colony and State of New York compiled by Edgar Albert Werner (1884; see pg. 276 for Senate districts; pg. 291 for senators; pg. 298–304 for Assembly districts; and pg. 379 for assemblymen)
- Journal of the Assembly (103rd Session) (1880)
