= William H. Murtha =

American politician

William H. Murtha (January 3, 1841, in Brooklyn, Kings County, New York – April 15, 1891, in Brooklyn, Kings Co., NY) was an American merchant and politician from New York.

== Life ==
He was born on January 3, 1841, in Brooklyn, New York, to James Murtha.

He began studying law but abandoned his studies in 1859 and became a merchant.

Murtha was a member of the highly rated amateur Enterprise Club of Brooklyn baseball team, which played in the early pre-professional years. He married and had two children, Regina Murtha and Rene Murtha.

At the beginning of the American Civil War, he was appointed as a clerk in the mustering bureau at the Brooklyn Navy Yard, but retired to establish a coal yard and made a fortune out of this business.

He was a member of the Board of Education of Brooklyn from 1869 to 1872; an Alderman in 1877; and a member of the New York State Senate (2nd D.) in 1880 and 1881. He was elected Register of Brooklyn in 1885.

He died on April 15, 1891, at his home at 132 Joralemon Street, in Brooklyn, of pneumonia.

== Sources ==
- Civil List and Constitutional History of the Colony and State of New York compiled by Edgar Albert Werner (1884; pg. 291)
- BREWSTER—DOUGHERTY in NYT on November 23, 1892 [his daughter's second wedding]

New York State Senate
Preceded by James F. Pierce	New York State Senate; 2nd District; 1880–1881	Succeeded by John J. Kiernan
