= Charles R. Skinner =

American politician

Charles Rufus Skinner
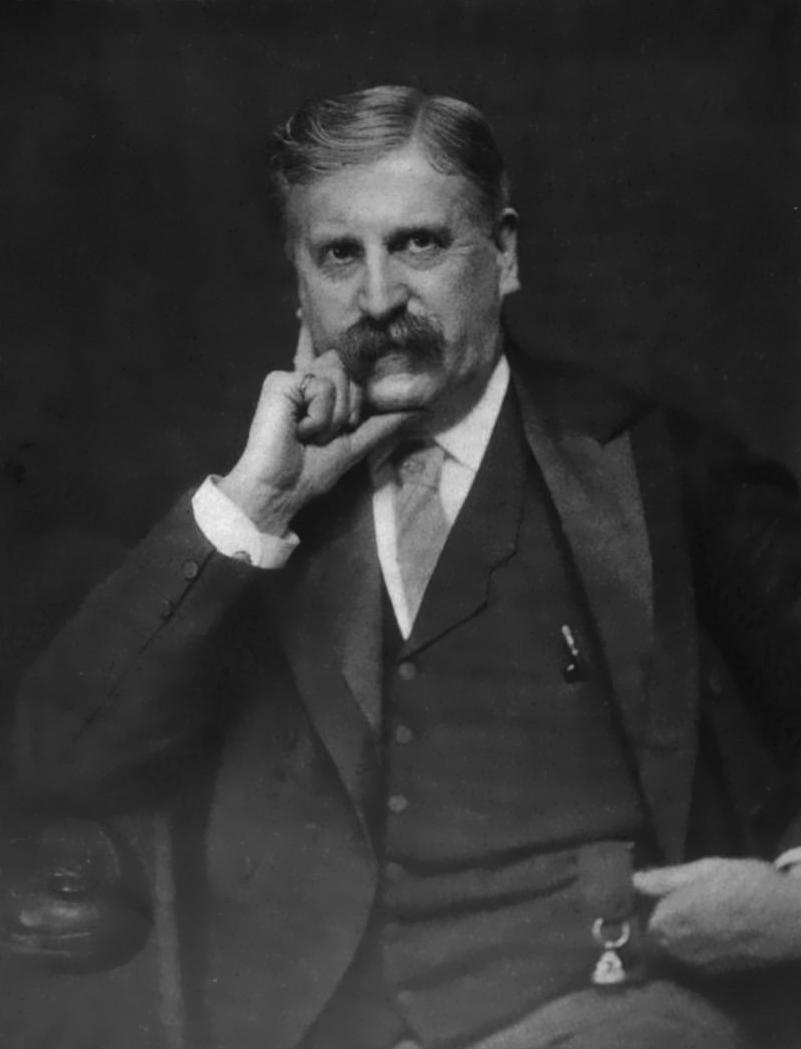
- Skinner in 1902

Member of the U.S. House of Representatives from New York's 22nd district
- In office November 8, 1881 – March 3, 1885
- Preceded by: Warner Miller
- Succeeded by: Abraham X. Parker

Member of the New York State Assembly for Jefferson County, 1st District
- In office January 1, 1877 – November 8, 1881
- Preceded by: Lotus Ingalls
- Succeeded by: Isaac L. Hunt, Jr.

Personal details
- Born: August 4, 1844 Union Square, Mexico, New York, U.S.
- Died: June 30, 1928 (aged 83) Pelham Manor, New York, U.S.
- Resting place: Brookside Cemetery, Watertown, New York, U.S.
- Party: Republican
- Parent: Avery Skinner (father)
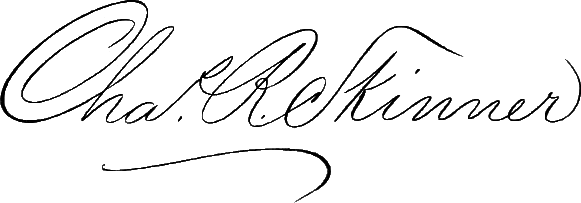
- Signature

Charles Rufus Skinner (August 4, 1844 – June 30, 1928) was a U.S. Representative from New York.

== Life ==
Skinner was born in Union Square (a hamlet now called Maple View) in the Town of Mexico, Oswego County, New York, the son of State Senator Avery Skinner (1796–1876) and Charlotte Prior (Stebbins) Skinner (1802–1888). He attended the common schools and Clinton Liberal Institute, and graduated from Mexico Academy, New York, in 1866. He taught in the common schools. He was editor of the Watertown Daily Times in 1870–1874. He served as member of the board of education of Watertown, New York from 1875 to 1884. He was a member of the New York State Assembly (Jefferson Co., 1st D.) in 1877, 1878, 1879, 1880 and 1881.

Skinner was elected as a Republican to the 47th United States Congress, to fill the vacancy caused by the election of Warner Miller to the U.S. Senate; and was re-elected to the 48th United States Congress, holding office from November 8, 1881, to March 3, 1885.

He served as member of the Board of Visitors to the United States Military Academy at West Point in 1884. He was editor of the Watertown Daily Republican 1885–1886. City editor of the Watertown Daily Times 1886. Deputy State superintendent of public instruction in 1886–1892. Supervisor of teachers' training classes and teachers' institutes in the State department of public instruction 1892–1895, and he was the Chairman of the Executive Committee at the State Normal College at Albany in 1894. State superintendent of public instruction in 1895–1904.

Skinner was elected president of the National Education Association in 1897. He served as assistant appraiser of merchandise for the port of New York in 1906–1911. Librarian of the State assembly in 1913 and 1914 and served as legislative librarian in 1915–1925. He died from pneumonia at his son's home in Pelham Manor, New York on June 30, 1928. His remains were cremated, and the ashes interred in Brookside Cemetery, Watertown, New York.

== Involvement with William McKinley ==
Skinner served in Congress with fellow Republican William McKinley, who was later to be elected president in 1896 and 1900. On September 6, 1901, Skinner was attending the Pan-American Exposition in Buffalo, New York to hear President McKinley give a speech about reciprocity. Skinner was a witness when after the President's speech, Leon Czolgosz approached the President, and shot him twice. McKinley died of his wounds on September 14, 1901, becoming the third President to be assassinated after Abraham Lincoln in 1865 and James Garfield in 1881.

Skinner previously lived in Washington D.C. in 1882, and had been asked to attend the execution of Garfield's assassin, Charles Guiteau, but was unable to attend due to the illness of his daughter. He was invited to Czolgosz's execution by the warden of Auburn Prison, and attended as one of only twelve "official" witnesses to the execution as required by New York law.

Less than two months after shooting McKinley, Czolgosz was executed on October 29, 1901, in Auburn Prison. Czolgosz was executed in the electric chair, an early usage of this new form of execution. Thomas Edison later re-enacted the execution in one of his earliest moving pictures.

In 1919, Skinner wrote an account of his experiences with McKinley, and of the events which occurred on the day of the execution of Czolgosz. The account appeared in State Service Magazine, and was entitled "Story of McKinley's Assassination". The article documents Czolgosz's last words:

"The reason I killed the President was because he was an enemy of he good people-for the benefit of the working man. That's all there is about it – I'm awful sorry I couldn't see my father. I am not sorry for my crime."

Skinner also was the author of the following books:

- Skinner, Charles R. "How Congress Acted Forty Years Ago: Reminiscences of a Member From New York State". State Service (N.Y.) 8 (December 1924): 104–10.
- ———. Manual of Patriotism, for Use in the Public Schools of the State of New York. [Albany, N.Y.: Brandow Printing Company], 1900.
- ———. Protection Patriotism Prosperity; A Safe Trinity. Washington: [Government Printing Office], 1884.
- ———. Speeches of Hon. Charles R. Skinner, of New York, in the House of Representatives. Washington: [Government Printing Office], 1884.
- ———, comp. The Bright Side: Little Excursions into the Field of Optimism. New York: F. D. Beattys & Co., [1909]. Reprint, Great Neck, N.Y.: Granger Book Co., 1979.
- ———, comp. Governors of New York from 1777 to 1920. Albany: J.B. Lyon Co., printers, 1919.
- ———, ed. Arbor Day Manual; An Aid in Preparing Programs for Arbor Day Exercises. Albany: Weed, Parsons and Company, 1890. Reprint, Freeport, N.Y.: Books for Libraries Press, [1971].
- ———, ed. Watertown, N.Y. A History of its Settlement and Progress, with a Description of its Commercial Advantages, as a Manufacturing Point. Watertown, N.Y.: Watertown Manufacturers Aid Association, 1876.

== Sources ==
- United States Congress. "Charles R. Skinner (id: S000467)". Biographical Directory of the United States Congress.

New York State Assembly
Preceded by Lotus Ingalls	New York State Assembly; Jefferson County, 1st District; 1877–1881	Succeeded by Isaac L. Hunt, Jr.
U.S. House of Representatives
Preceded by Warner Miller	Member of the U.S. House of Representatives from New York's 22nd congressional district 1881–1885	Succeeded by Abraham X. Parker
