= B. Platt Carpenter =

American politician (1837–1921)

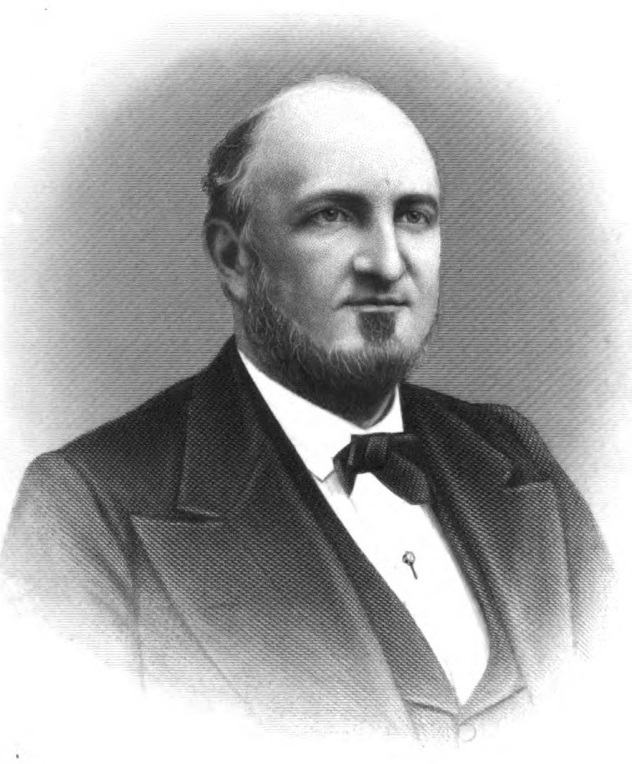

6th Governor of the Montana Territory
- In office December 16, 1884 – July 13, 1885
- Appointed by: Chester A. Arthur
- Preceded by: John Schuyler Crosby
- Succeeded by: Samuel Thomas Hauser

Chair of the New York Republican State Committee
- In office 1881–1882
- Preceded by: Chester A. Arthur
- Succeeded by: James D. Warren

Member of the New York State Senate from the 11th district
- In office 1876–1877
- Preceded by: Benjamin Ray
- Succeeded by: Stephen H. Wendover

Personal details
- Born: May 14, 1837 Stanford, New York, U.S.
- Died: December 24, 1921 (aged 84) Chula Vista, California, U.S.
- Resting place: Poughkeepsie Rural Cemetery; Poughkeepsie, New York, U.S.
- Party: Republican
- Spouse: Esther Thorn
- Profession: Attorney

Benjamin Platt Carpenter (May 14, 1837 – December 24, 1921) was an American lawyer and politician from New York and Montana. He was governor of the Montana Territory from 1884 to 1885.

== Biography ==
Carpenter was born in Stanford, Dutchess County, New York. He graduated from Union College in 1857, and studied law. He was admitted to the bar and practiced in Poughkeepsie, New York. On November 24, 1860, he married Esther Thorn, and they had three children.

Carpenter was District Attorney of Dutchess County from 1864 to 1869; a delegate to the New York State Constitutional Convention of 1867-68; a delegate to the 1868 and 1884 Republican National Conventions; a member of the New York State Senate (11th D.) in 1876 and 1877; and Judge of the Dutchess County Court from 1878 to 1882.

At the New York state election, 1882, he ran for Lieutenant Governor of New York on the Republican ticket with Charles J. Folger, but they were heavily defeated by Democrats Grover Cleveland and David B. Hill.

In December 1884, he was appointed by President Chester A. Arthur as Governor of the Montana Territory, and on December 31, 1884, he left Poughkeepsie for Helena, Montana. After a short tenure, he was removed from office by the new Democratic President, Grover Cleveland, but he stayed in Montana, and was a delegate to the Montana State Constitutional Convention of 1889.

On December 24, 1921, Carpenter died in Chula Vista, San Diego County, California. He was buried at Poughkeepsie Rural Cemetery.

His brother Jacob B. Carpenter (1826–1894) was Mayor of Poughkeepsie in 1875.

== Sources ==
- Jacob B. Carpenter His brother's obit in NYT on April 10, 1894
- The Bockée Family (Boucquet) 1641-1897 by Martha Bockée Flint (page 93)
- MONTANA TAKE WARNING; DON'T MAKE B. PLATT CARPENTER A SENATOR in NYT on December 4, 1889 (recalling the story of the 1882 New York state nominations)

New York State Senate
Preceded by Benjamin Ray	New York State Senate; 11th District; 1876–1877	Succeeded by Stephen H. Wendover
Party political offices
Preceded by Chester A. Arthur	Chairman of the New York State Republican Committee; 1881–1882	Succeeded by James D. Warren
Political offices
Preceded by John Schuyler Crosby	Territorial Governor of Montana; 1884–1885	Succeeded by Samuel Thomas Hauser
