= John E. Brodsky =

American politician

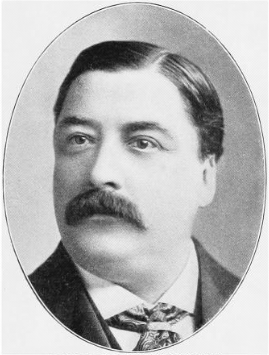

Member of the New York State Assembly
- In office 1880–1882, 1891
- Constituency: New York County 8th District

Personal details
- Born: John Ernst Brodsky; May 30, 1855 New York, New York, US
- Died: December 26, 1910 (aged 55) New York, New York, US
- Party: Republican; Democratic
- Spouse: Bertha Hartwig
- Children: 2
- Education: Columbia Law School
- Occupation: Lawyer, politician

John Ernst Brodsky (May 30, 1855 – December 26, 1910) was an American lawyer and politician from New York.

== Life ==
Brodsky was born on May 30, 1855, in New York City. His father John Brodsky was a stave maker who had immigrated from Beroun, now in the Czech Republic, and had married a German.

Brodsky attended Columbia Law School and graduated in 1876. He was admitted to the bar upon graduating. He worked first as a law clerk, then as a lawyer as a member of the law firm Johnson, Tilton, and Brodsky. He later moved to Harlem and practiced law with his brother F. W. Brodsky. They had a law office in the Emigrant Savings Bank.

In 1879, Brodsky was elected to the New York State Assembly as a Republican, representing the New York County 8th District. He served in the Assembly in 1880, 1881, 1882, and 1891. While in the Assembly he introduced and pushed for a bill for the consolidation of Manhattan and Brooklyn. In the 1882 United States House of Representatives election he was the Republican candidate for New York's 7th congressional district; he lost to William Dorsheimer. He was expelled from the Republican Party in 1896, and became a Democrat.

Brodsky was married to Bertha Hartwig. They had two daughters.

Brodsky died of dropsy in the German Hospital on December 26, 1910.

New York State Assembly
Preceded by Daniel Patterson (New York politician)	New York State Assembly; New York County, 8th District; 1880–1882	Succeeded by George H. Werfelman
Preceded by Philip Wissig	New York State Assembly; New York County, 8th District; 1891	Succeeded by Philip Wissig
