= Thomas Murphy (Collector) =

Irish-American businessman and politician (1821–1901)

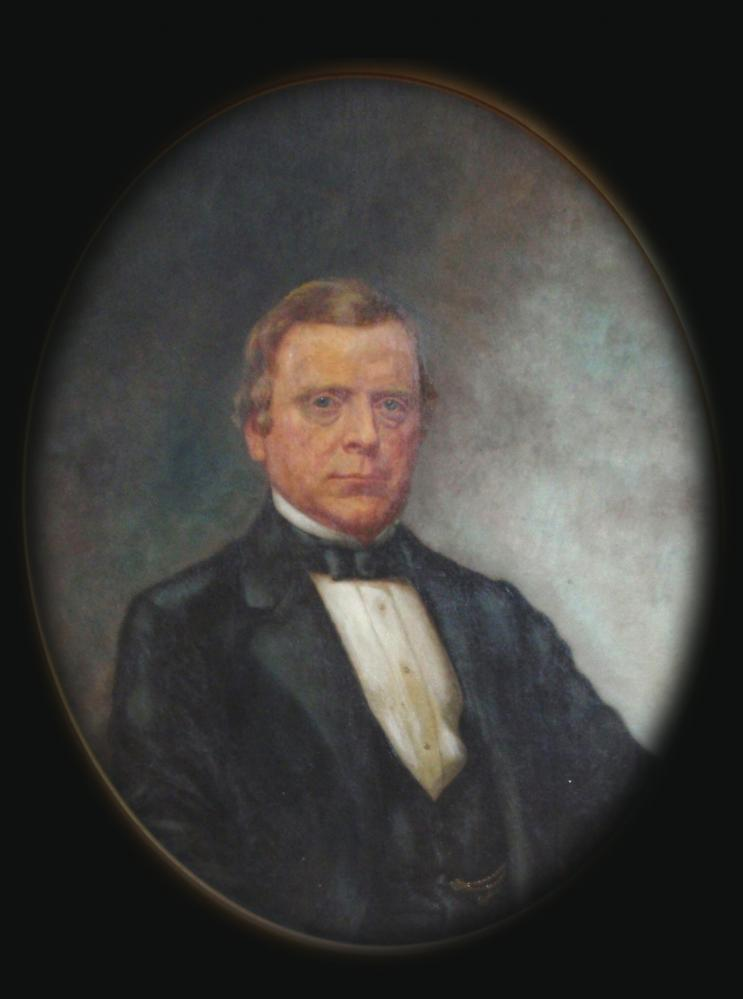
- Murphy, Collector of the Port of New York

Collector of the Port of New York
- In office 1870–1871
- Preceded by: Moses H. Grinnell
- Succeeded by: Chester A. Arthur

Member of the New York Senate from the 7th district
- In office 1879–1879
- Preceded by: John Morrissey
- Succeeded by: Ferdinand Eidman

Member of the New York Senate from the 7th district
- In office 1866–1867
- Preceded by: Thomas C. Fields
- Succeeded by: John J. Bradley

Personal details
- Born: 1821 Ireland
- Died: August 17, 1901 (aged 79–80)
- Resting place: Woodlawn Cemetery, The Bronx, New York City
- Party: Republican
- Spouse: Mary Gibbs (m. 1848; died 1897)
- Children: 5, including Edgar Gibbs Murphy
- Occupation: Businessman, politician

Thomas Murphy (1821 – August 17, 1901) was an Irish-American businessman and politician from New York City. He served as a member of the New York State Senate for a total of three terms (1866–1867 and 1879) and as the Collector of the Port of New York from 1870 to 1871. He was a prominent figure in the Republican political machine run by U.S. Senator Roscoe Conkling.

== Early life ==
Murphy was born in Ireland in 1821. He emigrated to the United States as a young man and entered the fur business. He became interested in politics, joining first the Whig Party and later the Republicans.

In 1848, he married Mary Gibbs (died 1897), and they had five children. Their son, Edgar Gibbs Murphy, became well known as a champion pigeon-shooter. Another son, Thomas Vinton Murphy, married Cora Howarth. They had a business running munitions and a gambling house in the 1880s.

== Political career ==
Murphy made his fortune selling equipment to the Union Army during the American Civil War, and soon thereafter became involved with the Republican political machine run by Roscoe Conkling.

He was a member of the New York State Senate (7th District) in 1866 and 1867.

=== Collector of the Port of New York ===
In 1870, Conkling asked President Ulysses S. Grant to appoint Murphy to the office of Collector of the Port of New York. Murphy antagonized other New York Republican factions by firing their members from Custom House jobs and replacing them with men loyal to Conkling. Murphy became sufficiently unpopular that Grant was forced to replace him, appointing Murphy's friend, Chester A. Arthur, to the post in his place.

=== Later political career ===
After his removal, Murphy ran for Congress from New York's 9th congressional district but was defeated. He was elected again as a member of the State Senate in 1879.

== Later life and death ==
Murphy eventually owned a horse farm in Deal, New Jersey. He died at his home on August 17, 1901, of kidney disease. His funeral was held at St. Patrick's Cathedral in New York. He was buried at Woodlawn Cemetery in the Bronx.

New York State Senate
| Preceded by Thomas C. Fields | New York State Senate; 7th District; 1866–1867 | Succeeded by John J. Bradley |
| Preceded by John Morrissey | New York State Senate; 7th District; 1879 | Succeeded by Ferdinand Eidman |
Government offices
| Preceded by Moses H. Grinnell | Collector of the Port of New York; 1870–1871 | Succeeded by Chester A. Arthur |
