= Walter W. Bahan =

American lawyer and politician (1860–1916)

Walter Watkins Bahan (November 6, 1860 – March 11, 1916) was an American lawyer and politician from New York City.

== Life ==
Bahan was born on November 6, 1860, in New York City, New York, the son of Thomas W. Bahan and Mary Jane Watkins. His father was a prominent Greenwich Village physician and surgeon who was active in relief works in the Parks Barracks during the American Civil War.

Bahan began attending the New York University School of Law in 1883 and graduated from there with an LL.B. in 1885. He then began working as a lawyer and real estate broker. In 1892, he was elected to the New York State Assembly as a Democrat, representing the New York County 9th District. He served in the Assembly in 1893. In the Assembly, he submitted bills to prevent the use of barbed wire in division fences, amend the Penal Code in relation to publishing libelous material, and amending the Penal Code to provide a person inducing another to commit a crime may not plead that the act was performed to obtain evidence of a person's criminal character with reference to conviction.

Bahan later moved to Queens and established a home and law office in Flushing, and then to Long Island City. He continued to work as a lawyer until a few days before his death. In 1884, he married Janet F. Halliday. They had one daughter, Mrs. Janet M. Lovey.

Bahan died at his home in Richmond Hill on March 11, 1916. He was buried in Green-Wood Cemetery.

New York State Assembly
Preceded by William H. Walker	New York State Assembly; New York County, 9th District; 1893	Succeeded by John F. McDermott
