= William W. Rockwell =

American politician

William W. Rockwell (July 21, 1824 –January 9, 1894) was an American politician from New York.

== Life ==
Born in Hadley, Saratoga County, New York, he attended the common schools, and graduated from Bennington Academy.

He was Supervisor of the Town of Hadley in 1846 and 1847; and a member of the New York State Assembly (Saratoga Co., 2nd D.) in 1849. Afterwards he became a merchant in Glens Falls.

He was a member of the New York State Senate from 1878 to 1881, sitting in the 101st, 102nd (both 16th D.), 103rd and 104th New York State Legislatures (both 19th D.).

He died of heart disease in his home in Glens Falls at the age of 69, after two years of ill health.

== Sources ==
- Civil List and Constitutional History of the Colony and State of New York compiled by Edgar Albert Werner (1884; pg. 291 and 355)
- The State Government for 1879 by Charles G. Shanks (Weed, Parsons & Co, Albany NY, 1879; pg. 59)
- History of Hadley, NY

New York State Assembly
Preceded by George Payn	New York State Assembly; Saratoga County, 2nd District; 1849	Succeeded by Frederick J. Wing
New York State Senate
Preceded by Franklin W. Tobey	New York State Senate; 16th District; 1878–1879	Succeeded by Isaac V. Baker, Jr.
Preceded by Alexander T. Goodwin	New York State Senate; 19th District; 1880–1881	Succeeded by Shepard B. Bowen
