= Ferdinand Eidman =

American politician and printer (1842–1910)

Collector of Internal Revenue for the Third District of New York
- In office 1897–1901

Collector of Internal Revenue for the Third District of New York
- In office 1889–1893

Coroner of New York City
- Incumbent
- Assumed office 1885

Member of the New York Senate from the 7th district
- In office 1880–1881
- Preceded by: Thomas Murphy
- Succeeded by: James Daly

Member of the New York State Assembly from the New York County, 10th district
- In office 1879–1879
- Preceded by: Joseph P. Strack
- Succeeded by: Edward Grosse

Personal details
- Born: December 1, 1842 Worms, Grand Duchy of Hesse
- Died: May 5, 1910 (aged 67) Manhattan, New York City, New York, U.S.
- Resting place: Lutheran All Faiths Cemetery
- Party: Republican
- Spouse: Mary Germann (m. 1865)
- Children: Several
- Occupation: Lithographic printer, politician

Military service
- Allegiance: United States
- Battles/wars: American Civil War

Ferdinand Eidman (December 1, 1842 – May 5, 1910) was an American printer and politician from New York. He served in the New York State Assembly in 1879 and in the New York State Senate from 1880 to 1881.

== Early life and military service ==
Eidman was born on December 1, 1842, in Worms, then in the Grand Duchy of Hesse (now in Rhineland-Palatinate, Germany). He attended the common schools in Germany and then emigrated to the United States, settling in New York City.

He became a lithographic printer. He fought in the American Civil War.

In 1865, he married Mary Germann, and they had several children.

== Political career ==
Eidman was a member of the New York State Assembly (New York County, 10th District) in 1879.

He was a member of the New York State Senate (7th District) in 1880 and 1881.

In 1885, he was elected Coroner of New York City.

He served as Collector of Internal Revenue for the Third District of New York during the Benjamin Harrison administration (1889–1893). He was again appointed to this office by President William McKinley in 1897.

== Death ==
Eidman died on May 5, 1910, at his home at 51 Seventh Street in Manhattan, New York City, of diabetes. He was 67 years old. He was buried at the Lutheran All Faiths Cemetery.

New York State Assembly
Preceded by Joseph P. Strack	New York State Assembly; New York County, 10th District; 1879	Succeeded by Edward Grosse
New York State Senate
Preceded by Thomas Murphy	New York State Senate; 7th District; 1880–1881	Succeeded by James Daly
