= Senator Ray =

Senator Ray may refer to:

- Benjamin Ray (1819–?), New York State Senate
- Bill Ray (politician) (1922–2013), Alaska State Senate
- James B. Ray (1794–1848), Indiana State Senate
- Lyman Beecher Ray (1831–1916), Illinois State Senate
- Patricia Torres Ray (born 1964), Minnesota State Senate
- Roy Ray (born 1939), Ohio State Senate
- William McCrary Ray II (born 1963), Georgia State Senate
- Kevin Raye (born 1961), Maine State Senate
