= Jeremiah Higgins =

American radio host and entertainment executive

Jeremiah D. Higgins
- Born: October 8, 1970 (age 55)
- Education: USC School of Cinematic Arts
- Occupations: Radio host, producer, hospitality consultant
- Known for: Host of The Jeremiah Show
- Website: thejeremiahshow.com

Jeremiah D. Higgins is an American radio host, executive producer, and hospitality consultant. He is the creator and host of The Jeremiah Show, a talk show featuring interviews with individuals in entertainment, hospitality, and the music industry. In addition to working in media, Higgins is involved in restaurant development and consulting.

== Early life and education ==
Higgins grew up in Priest River (Idaho), and graduated from Priest River Lamanna High School (PRLHS) in 1989. From 1998 to 2000, he attended the University of Southern California School of Cinematic Arts.

== Career ==
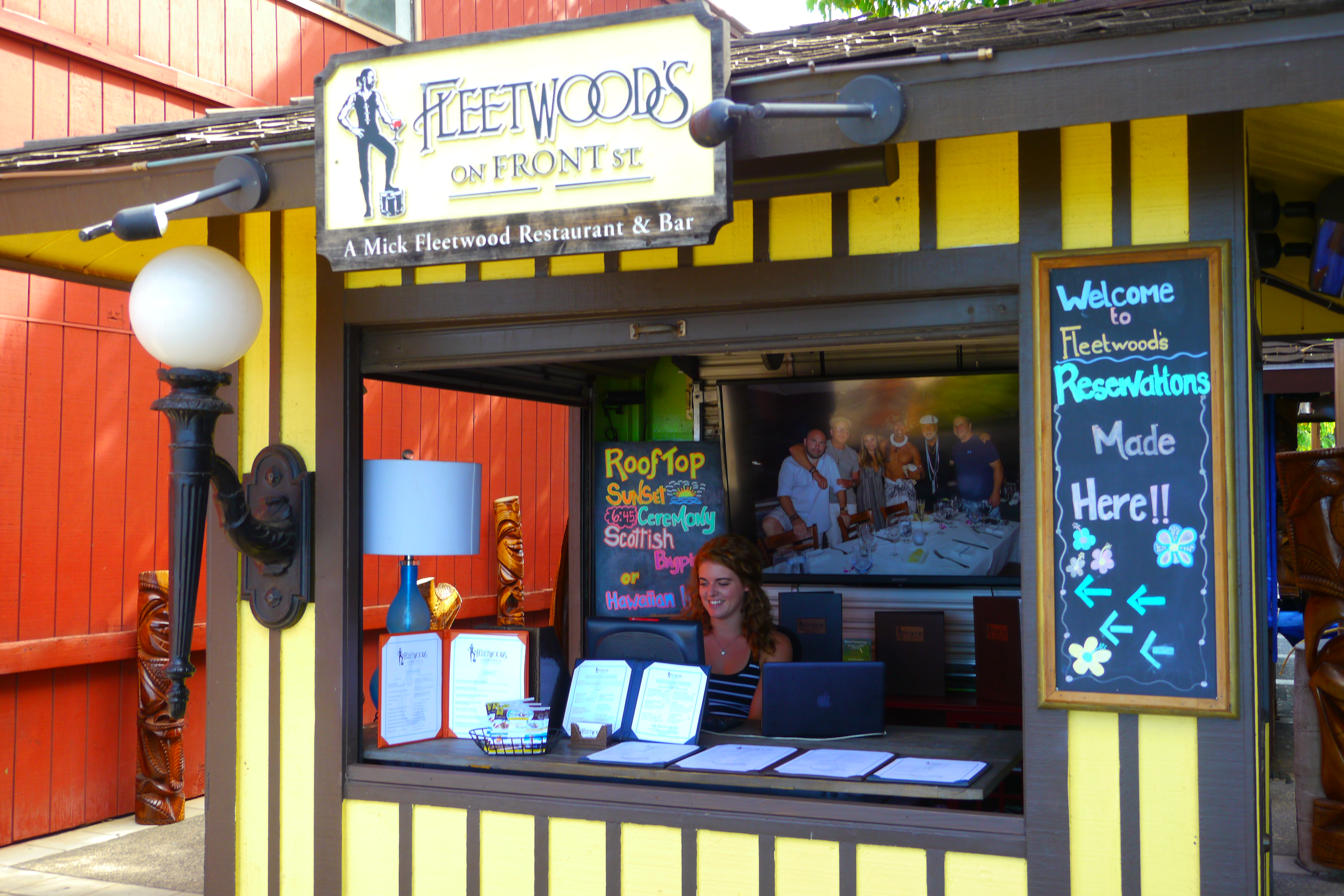
Fleetwood's On Front Street in Lahaina, Maui, Hawaii.

=== Hospitality ===
Through his company, HJL Hospitality, Higgins worked on the development and management of more than 200 music venues, hotels, nightclubs, restaurants, bars and retail stores. A few of the diverse building projects include Santa Monica Seafood’s retail stores, The Landsby Hotel, the Pueblo Bonito Hotel, and The Cabo Wave Hotel in Cabo San Lucas, Mexico.

In 2012, Higgins led the team that opened Fleetwood’s on Front St. in Lahaina, Maui. He became a business partner in the restaurant alongside Mick Fleetwood of Fleetwood Mac, Steven Tyler of Aerosmith and Sammy Hagar of Van Halen.

In a 2015 article by ''Restaurant Business Online'', Higgins offered cost-saving strategies for restaurant operators, emphasizing inventory control and staff engagement.

Higgins has also been active in community relief efforts. In 2018, following the devastating Montecito mudslides in Santa Barbara County, he organized volunteer support and media outreach to assist local businesses and displaced residents.

=== The Jeremiah Show ===
In 2015, Higgins launched The Jeremiah Show, which initially focused on the hospitality industry before expanding to feature interviews with figures from the music, film, business, and culinary sectors.

By 2025, the program had entered its 19th season with over 1400 episodes. It broadcasts weekly from Evolve Entertainment Network Studios in Los Angeles and Radio Evolve Studios in Santa Barbara, affiliated with the Santa Barbara News-Press and The New York Times.

Notable guests on The Jeremiah Show have included John Cleese, Yue-Sai Kan, Dennis Miller, Anne Heche, Jon Lovitz, Mariel Hemingway, Rosanna Arquette, Danny Trejo, Michael McDonald, Chris Hillman, Jeff "Skunk" Baxter, Girl Named Tom, as well as renowned chefs such as Nini Nguyen and William Eick.

Higgins is the founder and programming director of the Evolve Entertainment Network, which produces and syndicates original shows focused on lifestyle, music, and culture.

==== The Mike Gormley Show ====
Hosted by Mike Gormley, a Canadian-American music executive and former A&M Records and Billboard professional.

==== The Kimi Kato Show ====
Hosted by Kimi Kato and co-hosted by Higgins, the show explores Japanese culture, music, and seasonal themes.

==== The Arwen Lewis Show ====
Hosted and produced by Arwen Lewis, the show features musicians from indie and classic rock genres.
