= George P. Lord =

American politician

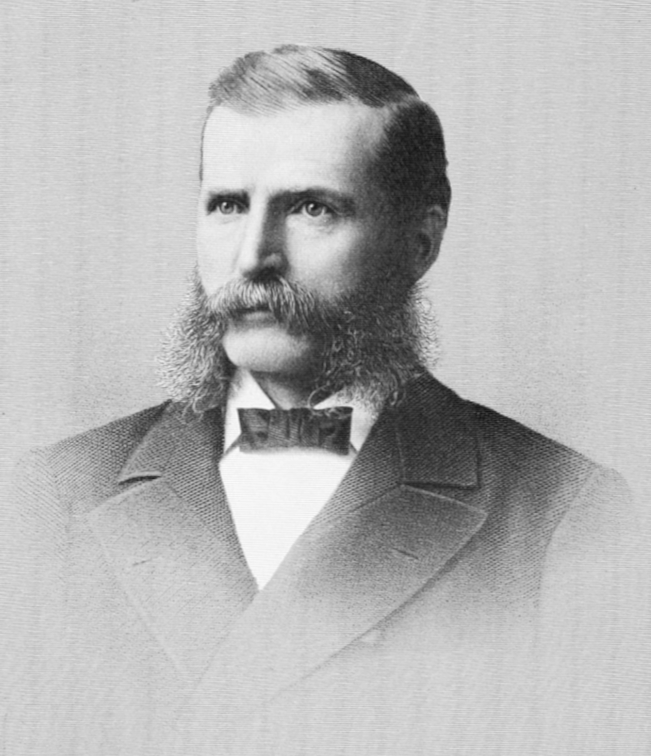

Member of the New York State Senate
- In office 1880–1883
- Constituency: 28th District

Member of the New York State Assembly
- In office 1871–1872

Personal details
- Born: July 25, 1831 Barrington, New York, US
- Died: July 11, 1917 (aged 85) Dundee, New York, US
- Spouse: Eliza Ann Bunce
- Education: Genesee Wesleyan Seminary; Hobart College
- Occupation: Merchant, banker, politician

George P. Lord (July 25, 1831 – July 11, 1917) was an American merchant, banker and politician from New York.

== Life ==
He was born on July 25, 1831, in Barrington, Yates County, New York, the son of Benjamin M. Lord and Elizabeth (Fleming) Lord. He graduated from Genesee Wesleyan Seminary, and in 1856 from Hobart College. Then he went to the Minnesota Territory and engaged in surveying and teaching. In 1859, he returned to Yates County, and married Eliza Ann Bunce (1838–1898). He taught school, engaged in farming, and was County School Commissioner from 1861 to 1866.

He was a member of the New York State Assembly (Yates Co.) in 1871 and 1872.

In 1878, he became a partner in a grain, malt and coal business.

He was a member of the New York State Senate (28th D.) from 1880 to 1883, sitting in the 103rd, 104th, 105th and 106th New York State Legislatures.

In 1891, he was elected President of the Dundee State Bank.

On January 20, 1896, he was appointed as a member of the New York State Civil Service Commission, and remained in office until 1899.

He died on July 11, 1917, at his home in Dundee, New York, of a stroke.

New York State Assembly
Preceded by William T. Remer	New York State Assembly; Yates County; 1871–1872	Succeeded by Morris B. Flinn
New York State Senate
Preceded by George Raines	New York State Senate; 28th District; 1880–1883	Succeeded by Thomas Robinson
