= George Raines =

American politician (1846–1908)

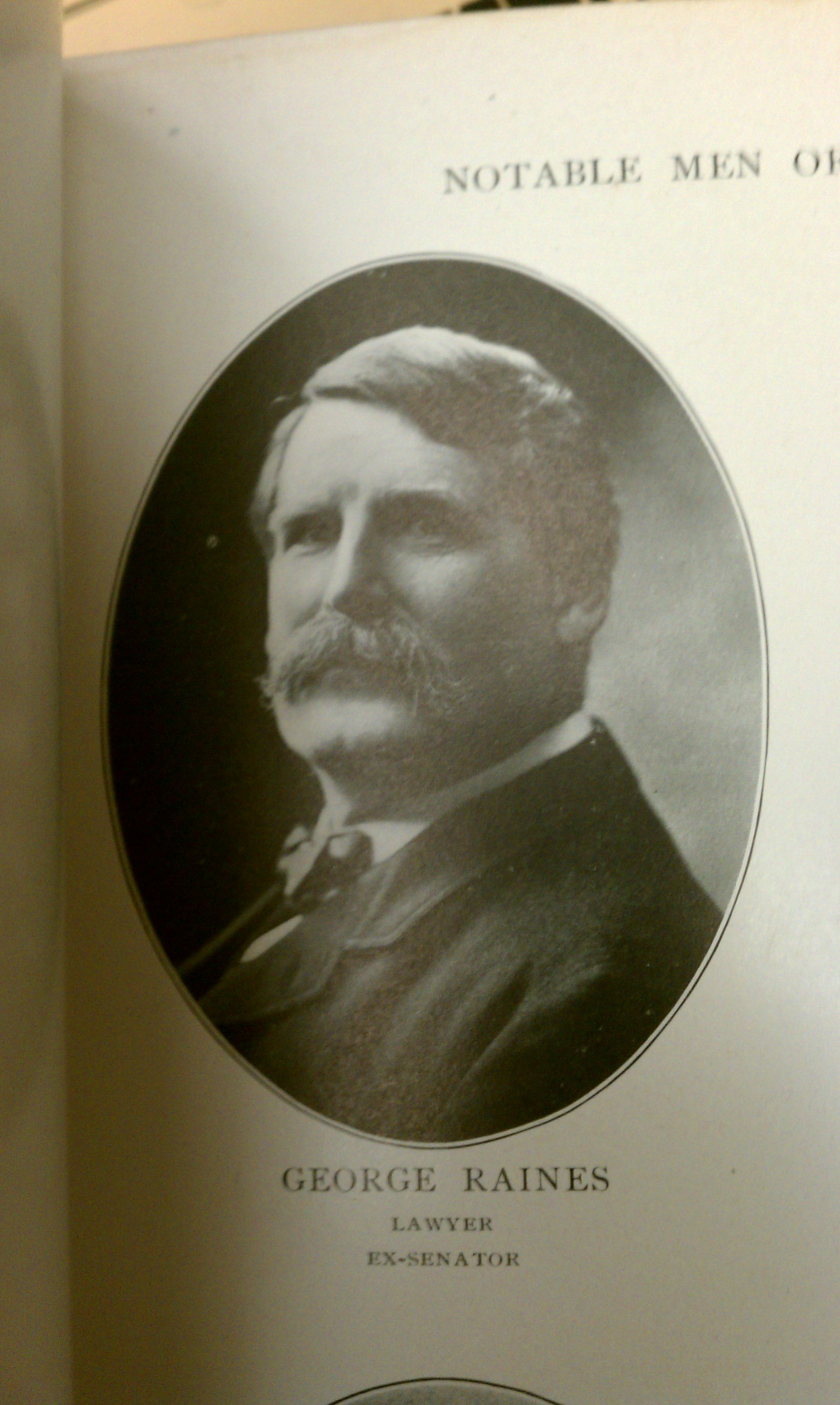
George Raines - Notable Men of Rochester and Vicinity XIX and XX

George Raines (November 10, 1846 – November 27, 1908) was an American lawyer and politician from New York.

== Life ==
He was in Pultneyville, New York to Rev. John Raines and Mary (Remington) Raines. He attended the common schools and Elmira Free Academy, and graduated from the University of Rochester in 1866. Then he studied law, was admitted to the bar in December 1867, and practiced in Rochester.

He entered politics as a Republican, joined the Liberal Republicans in 1872, and then remained a Democrat.

He was District Attorney of Monroe County from 1872 to 1877; and a member of the New York State Senate (28th D.) in 1878 and 1879.

He died in Rochester, New York and was buried at the Mount Hope Cemetery.

Congressman John Raines and State Treasurer Thomas Raines were his brothers.

New York State Senate
Preceded by William N. Emerson	New York State Senate; 28th District; 1878–1879	Succeeded by George P. Lord
