= William B. Woodin =

American politician

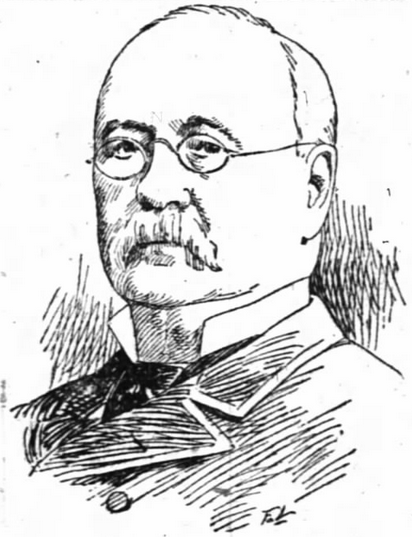

Member of the New York State Senate
- In office 1870–1877
- Preceded by: Stephen K. Williams
- Succeeded by: Theodore M. Pomeroy
- Constituency: 25th District
- In office 1880–1881
- Preceded by: Edwin Hicks
- Succeeded by: David H. Evans
- Constituency: 26th District

Member of the New York State Assembly
- In office 1855–1855
- Preceded by: Mathias Hutchinson
- Succeeded by: Tolbert Powers
- Constituency: Cayuga County, 3rd District

Personal details
- Born: September 25, 1824 Genoa, New York, US
- Died: November 1, 1893 (aged 69) Auburn, New York, US
- Resting place: Fort Hill Cemetery
- Party: Republican
- Occupation: Lawyer, politician

William B. Woodin (September 25, 1824 – November 1, 1893) was an American lawyer and politician from New York.

== Life ==
Woodin was born in Genoa, New York on September 25, 1824. He attended the district schools, Moravia Academy, and Cortland Academy in Homer. Then he studied law, was admitted to the bar, and commenced practice in Aurora. He was a member of the New York State Assembly (Cayuga Co., 3rd D.) in 1855. After his election as Surrogate, he removed to the county seat Auburn.

Woodin was Surrogate of Cayuga County from 1860 to 1871; and a member of the New York State Senate (25th D.) from 1870 to 1877, sitting in the 93rd, 94th, 95th, 96th, 97th, 98th, 99th and 100th New York State Legislatures. In 1877, he was accused of having taken bribes from William M. Tweed, but a State Senate investigation concluded that he was innocent. Nevertheless, Woodin declined to run for re-election.

Woodin was again a member of the State Senate (26th D.) in 1880 and 1881. He was a delegate to the 1880 Republican National Convention where he opposed Roscoe Conkling's plan to nominate Ulysses S. Grant for a third term. In 1882, Woodin abandoned the Republican candidate for Governor, Charles J. Folger, and supported Democrat Grover Cleveland instead.

Woodin was buried at the Fort Hill Cemetery in Auburn.

== Sources ==
- The New York Civil List compiled by Franklin Benjamin Hough, Stephen C. Hutchins and Edgar Albert Werner (1867; pg. 430)
- The New York Civil List compiled by Franklin Benjamin Hough, Stephen C. Hutchins and Edgar Albert Werner (1870; pg. 444 and 479)
- Life Sketches of Executive Officers, and Members of the Legislature of the State of New York, Vol. III by H. H. Boone & Theodore P. Cook (1870; pg. 141f)
- EX-SENATOR WOODIN DEAD in NYT on November 2, 1893

New York State Assembly
Preceded by Mathias Hutchinson	New York State Assembly; Cayuga County, 3rd District; 1855	Succeeded by Tolbert Powers
New York State Senate
Preceded by Stephen K. Williams	New York State Senate; 25th District; 1870–1877	Succeeded by Theodore M. Pomeroy
Preceded by Edwin Hicks	New York State Senate; 26th District; 1880–1881	Succeeded by David H. Evans
