= Joseph M. Congdon =

American politician

Joseph Miller Congdon (January 12, 1846 – September 15, 1907) was an American lawyer and politician from New York.

== Life ==
Congdon was born on January 12, 1846, in Napoli, New York, the son of William H. K. Congdon and Elizabeth Miller.

Congdon grew up on his father's farm and worked on the farm until he was fifteen, when he began attending the Randolph Academy under Samuel G. Love. When he was sixteen he started teaching in the winter while attending the academy in the spring and fall. In 1864, he moved to Oil City and worked on the oil wells for about two years during the rise and fall of Pithole. In 1868, he began studying law in East Randolph with Jenkins & Goodwill. He also studied law in Albany Law School. He finished his studies there in 1870 and was admitted to the bar later that year. In 1871, he formed a partnership in East Randolph with his brother Benjamin F. called Congdon & Congdon. In 1873, he began practicing law in Fredonia with his father-in-law Merrill T. Jenkins. In 1875, he moved to Gowanda and practiced law there. In 1877, he engaged in the oil business near Bradford, Pennsylvania, and drilled fourteen wells.

In 1879, Congdon was elected to the New York State Assembly as a Republican, representing the Cattaraugus County 2nd District. He served in the Assembly in 1880 and 1881. In the Assembly, he was interested in the codification of law, and while chairman of the judiciary committee in his second term he introduced and successfully passed penal and criminal codes. His efforts led to a friendship with David Dudley Field that lasted until Field's death. He lived in Buffalo from 1882 to 1884, although afterwards he returned to Gowanda. He later formed a law firm called J. M. & G. M. Congdon with his son Glenn. In 1895, he was elected to a three year term as district attorney of Cattaraugus County, which began in 1896. He was elected to a second term as district attorney. He spent the last few years of his life in Vermont, where he looked after certain financial matters related to the tanning business of A. C. Fisher.

Congdon was a charter member of the local lodge of the Ancient Order of United Workmen and a member of the Freemasons and the Knights of the Maccabees. In 1871, he married Alice M. Jenkins. Their children were Mrs. Alford Patridge, Glenn M., Robert E., and Walter B.

Congdon died in a train accident that killed 24 people four miles north of Canaan, New Hampshire, on September 15, 1907. He was buried in Pine Hill Cemetery in Gowanda.

New York State Assembly
Preceded by Simeon V. Pool	New York State Assembly; Cattaraugus County, 2nd District; 1880–1881	Succeeded by Milton M. Fenner
