= William N. Emerson =

American politician (1821–1891)

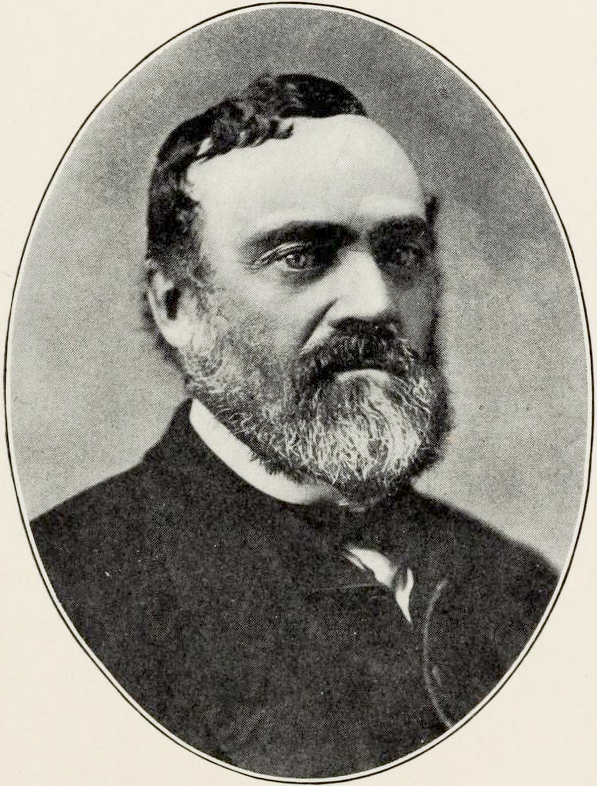
- Emerson in a 1902 publication

Member of the New York Senate from the 28th district
- In office 1876–1877
- Preceded by: Jarvis Lord
- Succeeded by: George Raines

Personal details
- Born: William Norman Emerson; September 29, 1821 Otsego County, New York, U.S.
- Died: June 2, 1891 (aged 69) Knoxville, Tennessee, U.S.
- Party: Free Soil; Republican
- Spouse: Sarah Lovejoy Smith (m. 1849)
- Children: 3
- Occupation: Politician; businessman; bank president

William Norman Emerson (September 29, 1821 – June 2, 1891) was an American politician from New York. He served in the New York State Senate, representing the 28th district, from 1876 to 1877.

== Early life ==
William Norman Emerson was born on September 29, 1821, in Otsego County, New York, to Sarah (née Olin) and Jazaniah Emerson. He was educated at Cooperstown Academy and at Hartwick and Hamilton from 1832 to 1836.

== Career ==
Emerson lived in Allegany County, New York, for a time before moving to Rochester in 1857. He engaged in mercantile business and worked in real estate in Rochester. He served as the first vice president of the East Side Savings Bank and later served as its president from 1875 to 1876.

Early in life, he was a member of the Free Soil Party. He later joined the Republican Party. He was a member of the Allegany County Board of Supervisors. He was a candidate for the New York State Assembly in 1854, but was defeated by 17 votes. He was a member of the board of alderman in Rochester from 1864 to 1865. He was elected to the New York State Senate, representing the 28th district, as a Republican with a plurality of 1,554 votes, defeating Alexander B. Lamberton (Democrat) and M. O. Randall (Populist). He succeeded Jarvis Lord and served from 1876 to 1877. In 1877, he proposed legislation in the senate for any women with the same qualifications as a man to be elected to any office of school administration. The legislation passed the senate and assembly, but was vetoed by Governor Lucius Robinson. He was re-nominated by the Republican Party for re-election in 1877.

== Personal life ==
Emerson married Sarah Lovejoy Smith, daughter of judge Willard H. Smith, on May 10, 1849. They had three children, Mary Johnson, Willard J. and Frank W.

Emerson died on June 2, 1891, in Knoxville, Tennessee.

New York State Senate
Preceded by Jarvis Lord	New York State Senate; 28th District; 1876–1877	Succeeded by George Raines
