= Lewis Beach (politician, born 1828) =

American farmer and politician (1828–1918)

Lewis Beach (January 5, 1828 – July 30, 1918) was an American farmer and politician from New York.

== Life ==
Beach was born on January 5, 1828, in Tyrone, New York, the son of Obadiah Beach and Mary Lang.

Beach initially worked on a farm and a clerk in a dry goods store. In 1853, he moved to Wisconsin and settled had a farm near Janesville. In September 1861, after the American Civil War broke out, he enlisted in Company A of the 13th Wisconsin Infantry Regiment. He fought in the War with them until November 1864, when he suffered poor health and returned to Tyrone.

After returning to Tyrone, Beach lived with his father until the latter's death. He mostly lived in Tyrone as a farmer for the rest of his life, although he lived in Polk County, Iowa in 1871 and 1872. He served as town supervisor for Tyrone for eight terms, from 1874 to 1891.

In 1879, Beach was elected to the New York State Assembly as a Republican, representing Schuyler County. He served in the Assembly in 1880 and 1881.

In 1869, Beach married Adelia Willis. Their two sons were Philip L. and Charles W. He was a member of the Grand Army of the Republic and was a Freemason for 51 years. He was a member of the Presbyterian Church.

Beach died at his son Charles' home west of Watkins Glen on July 30, 1918. He was buried in Tyrone Cemetery.

New York State Assembly
Preceded by Abram V. Mekeel	New York State Assembly; Schuyler County; 1880-1881	Succeeded by Minor T. Jones
