= George E. Williams (New York politician) =

American politician

George E. Williams (28 February 1828 – 31 October 1914) was an American newspaper publisher and politician from New York.

== Life ==
He was born on February 28, 1828, in Clay, Onondaga County, New York. He attended the public schools, and for six months the Clinton Liberal Institute. In 1851, he became the editor and publisher of the Phoenix Gazette, a Whig-leaning newspaper. Two years later he moved to Fulton, in Oswego County, and published there the Oswego County Gazette. Williams and his paper joined the Republican cause in 1855. In 1858, the paper was merged with Richard K. Sanford's Fulton Patriot to become the Fulton Patriot and Gazette. From 1865 to 1867, Williams traveled about Louisiana and Alabama, to get a picture of the South after the American Civil War. After his return he established the Fulton Times, an independent newspaper which he published until 1881.

Williams joined the Greenback Party in 1878, and in November of that year was elected to the New York State Assembly. He polled 40 votes more than his Republican opponent. He was a member of the 102nd New York State Legislature in 1879.

New York State Assembly
| Preceded by George M. Case | New York State Assembly; Oswego County, 2nd District; 1879 | Succeeded by William H. Steele |
