= Members of the Board of Regents of the University of the State of New York =

Overview of the Board of Regents of the University of the State of New York

== List of regents ==
=== Ex officio members who served from May 1, 1784 founding to April 13, 1787 reconfiguration ===
- George Clinton, Governor
- Pierre Van Cortlandt, Lieutenant Governor
- James Duane, Mayor of New York City
- Johannes Jacobse Beeckman, Mayor of Albany, until September 29, 1786
- Egbert Benson, Attorney General
- John Morin Scott, secretary of state, until September 14, 1784
- Lewis Allaire Scott, secretary of state, from October 23, 1784
- John Hathorn, Speaker, until October 12, 1784
- David Gelston, Speaker, October 12, 1784, to January 12, 1786
- John Lansing Jr., Speaker, January 12, 1786 to January 12, 1787; Mayor of Albany, January 12, 1787
- Richard Varick, Speaker, January 12, 1787
- Abraham Yates, President Pro Tempore of the NYS Senate, from October 18

=== Regents appointed on May 1, 1784 who served until the April 13, 1787 reconfiguration ===
- Henry Brockholst Livingston
- Robert Harpur
- Walter Livingston
- Christopher Yates
- Anthony Hoffman
- Cornelius Humfrey
- Lewis Morris
- Philip Pell
- Henry Wisner
- John Haring
- Christopher Tappen
- James Clinton
- Christopher P. Yates
- James Livingston
- Abraham Bancker
- John C. Dongan
- Matthew Clarkson
- Rutger Van Brunt
- James Townsend
- Thomas Lawrence
- Ezra L'Hommedieu
- Caleb Smith
- John Williams
- John McCrea

=== Regents added on November 12, 1784 who served until the April 13, 1787 reconfiguration ===
- John Jay
- Samuel Provost
- John Henry Livingston
- Rev. John Rodgers
- John Mason
- John Gano
- John Daniel Gros
- Johan Ch. Kunze
- Joseph Delaplain
- Gershom Seixas
- Alexander Hamilton
- John Laurance
- John Rutherford
- Morgan Lewis
- Leonard Lispenard
- John Cochran
- Charles McKnight
- Thomas Jones
- Malachi Trent
- Nicholas Romain
- Peter W. Yates
- Matthew Vischer
- Hunlock Woodruff
- George J. L. Doll
- John Vanderbilt
- Thomas Romain
- Samuel Buel
- Gilbert Livingston
- Nathan Kerr
- Ebenezer Lockwood
- John Lloyd Jr.
- Hermanus Garrison
- Ebenezer Russell

=== Regents Sworn In from April 13, 1787 to 1904 reconfiguration ===
Notes: Ex officio tenures are not mentioned if the officeholder was a full member at the same time.

| Regent | Entered office | Notes | Left office | Notes |
|---|---|---|---|---|
| Egbert Benson | April 13, 1787 | previously ex officio member | 1802 | resigned |
| Matthew Clarkson | April 13, 1787 | re-appointed | April 25, 1825 | died |
| George Clinton | April 13, 1787 | ex officio as governor | June 30, 1795 | term ended |
| John Jay | April 13, 1787 | re-appointed | 1790 | resigned |
| John Jay | July 1, 1795 | ex officio as governor | June 30, 1801 | term ended |
| Nathan Kerr | April 13, 1787 | re-appointed; AKA Nathan Carr | December 21, 1804 | died |
| Andrew King | April 13, 1787 | | November 16, 1815 | died |
| Ezra L'Hommedieu | April 13, 1787 | re-appointed | September 27, 1811 | died |
| William Linn | April 13, 1787 | AKA William Lynn | January 8, 1808 | died |
| James Livingston | April 13, 1787 | re-appointed | 1797 | resigned |
| John McDonald | April 13, 1787 | | 1796 | resigned |
| Benjamin Moore | April 13, 1787 | | 1802 | resigned |
| Lewis Morris | April 13, 1787 | re-appointed | January 22, 1798 | died |
| John Rogers | April 13, 1787 | re-appointed | May 7, 1811 | died |
| Dirck Romeyn | April 13, 1787 | | 1796 | resigned |
| Ebenezer Russell | April 13, 1787 | re-appointed | February 25, 1813 | resigned |
| Philip Schuyler | April 13, 1787 | | November 18, 1804 | died |
| Peter Silvester | April 13, 1787 | AKA Peter Sylvester | October 15, 1808 | died |
| Jonathan G. Tompkins | April 13, 1787 | AKA Jonathan G. Thompkins | 1808 | resigned |
| Pierre Van Cortlandt | April 13, 1787 | ex officio as lieutenant governor | June 30, 1795 | term ended |
| Friedrich Wilhelm von Steuben | April 13, 1787 | AKA Frederick William de Steuben | November 28, 1794 | died |
| Eilardus Westerlo | April 13, 1787 | | December 26, 1790 | died |
| Gulian Verplanck | March 30, 1790 | replaced John Jay | November 20, 1799 | died |
| Zephaniah Platt | January 15, 1791 | replaced Eilardus Westerlo | September 12, 1807 | died |
| James Watson | January 28, 1795 | replaced Friedrich Wilhelm von Steuben | May 15, 1806 | died |
| Stephen Van Rensselaer | July 1, 1795 | ex officio as lieutenant governor | June 30, 1801 | term ended |
| James Cochran | February 18, 1796 | replaced Dirck Romeyn | 1820 | resigned |
| Rev. Jonas Coe | March 24, 1796 | replaced John McDonald | | declined to take office |
| Abraham Van Vechten | January 11, 1797 | replaced James Livingston | 1823 | resigned |
| Rev. Thomas Ellison | February 28, 1797 | replaced Jonas Coe | April 26, 1802 | died |
| Simeon De Witt | March 13, 1798 | replaced Lewis Morris | December 3, 1834 | died |
| James Kent | February 8, 1800 | replaced Gulian Verplanck | April 1, 1816 | vacated |
| George Clinton | July 1, 1801 | ex officio as governor | June 30, 1804 | term ended |
| Jeremiah Van Rensselaer | July 1, 1801 | ex officio as lieutenant governor | June 30, 1804 | term ended |
| John Tayler | February 1, 1802 | replaced Egbert Benson | March 19, 1829 | died |
| Henry Rutgers | February 15, 1802 | replaced Benjamin Moore | 1826 | resigned |
| Charles Selden | February 18, 1803 | replaced Thomas Ellison | 1816 | vacated |
| Morgan Lewis | July 1, 1804 | ex officio as governor | June 30, 1807 | term ended |
| John Broome | July 1, 1804 | ex officio as lieutenant governor | August 8, 1810 | died |
| Ambrose Spencer | January 28, 1805 | replaced Philip Schuyler | 1816 | vacated |
| Lucas Elmendorf | January 28, 1805 | replaced Nathan Kerr | 1822 | vacated |
| Elisha Jenkins | February 11, 1807 | replaced James Watson | May 18, 1848 | died |
| Daniel D. Tompkins | July 1, 1807 | ex officio as governor | February 24, 1817 | resigned |
| DeWitt Clinton | February 11, 1808 | replaced William Linn | 1825 | resigned |
| DeWitt Clinton | January 1, 1825 | ex officio as governor | February 11, 1828 | died |
| Peter Gansevoort | February 11, 1808 | replaced Zephaniah Platt | July 2, 1812 | died |
| Alexander Sheldon | February 11, 1808 | replaced Jonathan G. Tompkins | 1816 | vacated |
| Nathan Smith | January 31, 1809 | replaced Peter Silvester | 1822 | vacated |
| Solomon Southwick | February 28, 1812 | replaced Ezra L'Hommedieu | 1823 | resigned |
| Joseph C. Yates | February 28, 1812 | replaced John Rogers | 1833 | resigned |
| Smith Thompson | March 8, 1813 | replaced Peter Gansevoort | 1819 | resigned |
| John Woodworth | March 8, 1813 | replaced Ebenezer Russell | 1822 | resigned |
| Martin Van Buren | March 4, 1816 | replaced Andrew King | 1829 | resigned |
| John De Witt | January 28, 1817 | replaced Alexander Sheldon | 1823 | resigned |
| Nathan Williams | January 28, 1817 | replaced Ambrose Spencer | 1824 | vacated |
| John Lansing Jr. | January 28, 1817 | replaced James Kent | December 12, 1829 | disappeared |
| Samuel Young | January 28, 1817 | replaced Charles Selden | 1835 | resigned |
| Philetus Swift | February 1817 | ex officio as acting lieutenant governor | June 30, 1817 | term ended |
| Stephen Van Rensselaer | March 16, 1819 | replaced Smith Thompson | January 26, 1839 | died |
| William A. Duer | February 1, 1820 | replaced James Cochran | 1824 | vacated |
| Harmanus Bleecker | February 7, 1822 | replaced Nathan Smith | 1834 | resigned |
| James Thompson | February 7, 1822 | replaced Lucas Elmendorf | 1845 | died |
| Erastus Root | January 1, 1823 | ex officio as lieutenant governor | December 31, 1824 | term ended |
| Samuel A. Talcott | February 15, 1823 | replaced John Woodworth | 1829 | resigned |
| James King | February 15, 1823 | replaced Abraham Van Vechten | 1841 | died |
| Peter Wendell | February 15, 1823 | replaced Solomon Southwick | 1849 | died |
| William L. Marcy | April 9, 1823 | replaced John De Witt | 1828 | resigned |
| Robert Troup | February 13, 1824 | replaced William A. Duer | 1827 | resigned |
| Peter B. Porter | February 13, 1824 | replaced Nathan Williams | 1830 | resigned |
| James Tallmadge Jr. | January 1, 1825 | ex officio as lieutenant governor | December 31, 1826 | term ended |
| John Greig | January 12, 1825 | replaced DeWitt Clinton | April 9, 1858 | died |
| Jesse Buel | January 26, 1826 | replaced Henry Rutgers | October 8, 1839 | died |
| Gulian C. Verplanck | January 26, 1826 | replaced Matthew Clarkson | March 18, 1870 | died |
| Nathaniel Pitcher | January 1, 1827 | ex officio as lieutenant governor | February 11, 1828 | became Governor |
| Nathaniel Pitcher | February 11, 1828 | ex officio as governor | December 31, 1828 | term ended |
| Edward P. Livingston | February 20, 1827 | replaced Robert Troup | 1831 | resigned |
| Edward P. Livingston | January 1, 1831 | ex officio as lieutenant governor | December 31, 1832 | term ended |
| Peter R. Livingston | February 1828 | ex officio as acting lieutenant governor | October 17, 1828 | successor elected |
| Benjamin F. Butler | February 29, 1828 | replaced William L. Marcy | 1832 | resigned |
| Charles Dayan | October 17, 1828 | ex officio as acting lieutenant governor | December 31, 1828 | term ended |
| Enos T. Throop | January 1, 1829 | ex officio as lieutenant governor | March 12, 1829 | became Governor |
| Enos T. Throop | March 12, 1829 | ex officio as governor | December 31, 1832 | term ended |
| Charles Stebbins | March 1829 | ex officio as acting lieutenant governor | December 31, 1829 | term ended |
| Gerrit Y. Lansing | March 31, 1829 | replaced Martin Van Buren | January 3, 1862 | died |
| John Keyes Paige | March 31, 1829 | replaced Samuel A. Talcott | 1857 | died |
| John Sudam | March 31, 1829 | replaced John Tayler | April 13, 1835 | died |
| William M. Oliver | January 5, 1830 | ex officio as acting lieutenant governor | December 31, 1830 | term ended |
| John P. Cushman | April 2, 1830 | replaced John Lansing Jr. | 1834 | resigned |
| John Tracy | April 2, 1830 | replaced Peter B. Porter | 1833 | resigned |
| John Tracy | January 1, 1833 | ex officio as lieutenant governor | December 31, 1838 | term ended |
| John Adams Dix | March 23, 1831 | replaced Edward P. Livingston | 1846 | resigned |
| John L. Viele | February 6, 1832 | replaced Benjamin F. Butler | October 19, 1832 | died |
| William L. Marcy | January 1, 1833 | ex officio as governor | December 31, 1838 | term ended |
| William Campbell | February 5, 1833 | replaced John Tracy | October 27, 1844 | died |
| Erastus Corning | February 5, 1833 | replaced John L. Viele | April 9, 1872 | died |
| Prosper M. Wetmore | April 4, 1833 | replaced Joseph C. Yates | March 16, 1876 | died |
| James McKown | April 17, 1834 | replaced Harmanus Bleecker | 1847 | died |
| John Lorimer Graham | April 17, 1834 | replaced John P. Cushman | 1864 | resigned |
| Amasa J. Parker | January 20, 1835 | replaced Simeon De Witt | 1844 | resigned |
| John McLean Jr. | April 8, 1835 | replaced Samuel Young | December 5, 1858 | died |
| Washington Irving | May 9, 1835 | replaced John Sudam | 1842 | resigned |
| William H. Seward | January 1, 1839 | ex officio as governor | December 31, 1842 | term ended |
| Luther Bradish | January 1, 1839 | ex officio as lieutenant governor | December 31, 1842 | term ended |
| Joseph Russell | February 18, 1839 | replaced Stephen Van Rensselaer | 1844 | resigned |
| John C. Spencer | February 28, 1840 | replaced Jesse Buel | 1844 | vacated |
| Gideon Hawley | February 1, 1842 | replaced James King | July 17, 1870 | died |
| David Buel | March 24, 1842 | replaced Washington Irving | August 16, 1860 | died |
| Samuel Young | April 8, 1842 | ex officio as secretary of state | February 8, 1845 | successor elected |
| William C. Bouck | January 1, 1843 | ex officio as governor | December 31, 1844 | term ended |
| Daniel S. Dickinson | January 1, 1843 | ex officio as lieutenant governor | December 31, 1844 | term ended |
| James S. Wadsworth | May 4, 1844 | replaced Amasa J. Parker | May 8, 1864 | died |
| John V. L. Pruyn | May 4, 1844 | replaced John C. Spencer | November 21, 1877 | died |
| Silas Wright | January 1, 1845 | ex officio as governor | December 31, 1846 | term ended |
| Addison Gardiner | January 1, 1845 | ex officio as lieutenant governor | June 1847 | resigned |
| William C. Bouck | February 3, 1845 | replaced Joseph Russell | 1847 | vacated |
| Martin Van Buren | February 3, 1845 | replaced William Campbell | 1845 | resigned |
| Nathaniel S. Benton | February 8, 1845 | ex officio as secretary of state | December 31, 1847 | term ended |
| Jabez D. Hammond | May 10, 1845 | replaced Martin Van Buren | August 18, 1855 | died |
| John L. O'Sullivan | February 2, 1846 | replaced John Adams Dix | 1855 | resigned |
| Robert Campbell | February 2, 1846 | replaced James Thompson | July 16, 1870 | died |
| John Young | January 1, 1847 | ex officio as governor | December 31, 1848 | term ended |
| Rev. Samuel Luckey D.D. | May 6, 1847 | replaced William C. Bouck | October 11, 1869 | died |
| Albert Lester | July 1847 | ex officio as acting lieutenant governor | December 31, 1847 | term ended |
| Robert G. Rankin | September 27, 1847 | replaced James McKown | August 29, 1878 | died |
| Hamilton Fish | January 1, 1848 | ex officio as lieutenant governor | December 31, 1848 | term ended |
| Hamilton Fish | January 1, 1849 | ex officio as governor | December 31, 1850 | term ended |
| Christopher Morgan | January 1, 1848 | ex officio as secretary of state | December 31, 1851 | term ended |
| George W. Patterson | January 1, 1849 | ex officio as lieutenant governor | December 31, 1850 | term ended |
| Philip S. Van Rensselaer | February 6, 1849 | replaced Elisha Jenkins | 1856 | resigned |
| Washington Hunt | January 1, 1851 | ex officio as governor | December 31, 1852 | term ended |
| Sanford E. Church | January 1, 1851 | ex officio as lieutenant governor | December 31, 1854 | term ended |
| John N. Campbell | March 18, 1851 | replaced Peter Wendell | March 27, 1864 | died |
| Henry S. Randall | January 1, 1852 | ex officio as secretary of state | December 31, 1853 | term ended |
| Horatio Seymour | January 1, 1853 | ex officio as governor | December 31, 1854 | term ended |
| Elias W. Leavenworth | January 1, 1854 | ex officio as secretary of state | December 31, 1855 | term ended |
| Victor M. Rice | March 30, 1854 | ex officio as superintendent of public instruction | April 7, 1857 | successor elected |
| Myron H. Clark | January 1, 1855 | ex officio as governor | December 31, 1856 | term ended |
| Henry J. Raymond | January 1, 1855 | ex officio as lieutenant governor | December 31, 1856 | term ended |
| Erastus C. Benedict | March 21, 1855 | replaced John L. O'Sullivan | October 22, 1880 | died |
| Joel T. Headley | January 1, 1856 | ex officio as secretary of state | December 31, 1857 | term ended |
| George W. Clinton | March 6, 1856 | replaced Jabez D. Hammond | September 7, 1885 | died |
| Robert Kelly | March 6, 1856 | replaced Philip S. Van Rensselaer | 1856 | died |
| John A. King | January 1, 1857 | ex officio as governor | December 31, 1858 | term ended |
| Henry R. Selden | January 1, 1857 | ex officio as lieutenant governor | December 31, 1858 | term ended |
| Rev. Isaac Parks D.D. | April 7, 1857 | replaced Robert Kelly | April 15, 1869 | died |
| Henry H. Van Dyck | April 7, 1857 | ex officio as superintendent of public instruction | April 16, 1861 | resigned |
| Gideon J. Tucker | January 1, 1858 | ex officio as secretary of state | December 31, 1859 | term ended |
| Lorenzo Burrows | February 16, 1858 | replaced John Keyes Paige | March 6, 1885 | died |
| William Cullen Bryant | April 15, 1858 | replaced John Greig | | declined to take office |
| Edwin D. Morgan | January 1, 1859 | ex officio as governor | December 31, 1862 | term ended |
| Rev. George B. Cheever D.D. | March 29, 1859 | replaced William Cullen Bryant | 1861 | vacated |
| Robert S. Hale | March 29, 1859 | replaced John McLean Jr. | December 14, 1881 | died |
| David R. Floyd-Jones | January 1, 1860 | ex officio as secretary of state | December 31, 1861 | term ended |
| J. Carson Brevoort | February 5, 1861 | replaced George B. Cheever | 1885 | resigned |
| Elias W. Leavenworth | February 5, 1861 | replaced David Buel | November 25, 1887 | died |
| Emerson W. Keyes | April 16, 1861 | ex officio as acting superintendent of public instruction | January 30, 1862 | successor elected |
| Horatio Ballard | January 1, 1862 | ex officio as secretary of state | December 31, 1863 | term ended |
| George R. Perkins | January 30, 1862 | replaced Gerrit Y. Lansing | August 22, 1876 | died |
| Victor M. Rice | January 30, 1862 | ex officio as superintendent of public instruction | April 7, 1868 | term ended |
| Horatio Seymour | January 1, 1863 | ex officio as governor | December 31, 1864 | term ended |
| David R. Floyd-Jones | January 1, 1863 | ex officio as lieutenant governor | December 31, 1864 | term ended |
| Chauncey M. Depew | January 1, 1864 | ex officio as secretary of state | December 31, 1865 | term ended |
| George William Curtis | April 12, 1864 | replaced John Lorimer Graham | August 31, 1892 | died |
| Alexander S. Johnson | April 12, 1864 | replaced John N. Campbell | December 1873 | resigned |
| Thomas G. Alvord | January 1, 1865 | ex officio as lieutenant governor | December 31, 1866 | term ended |
| Reuben Fenton | January 1, 1865 | ex officio as governor | December 31, 1868 | term ended |
| William H. Goodwin | January 24, 1865 | replaced James S. Wadsworth | February 17, 1876 | died |
| Francis C. Barlow | January 1, 1866 | ex officio as secretary of state | December 31, 1867 | term ended |
| Stewart L. Woodford | January 1, 1867 | ex officio as lieutenant governor | December 31, 1868 | term ended |
| Homer A. Nelson | January 1, 1868 | ex officio as secretary of state | December 31, 1871 | term ended |
| Abram B. Weaver | April 7, 1868 | ex officio as superintendent of public instruction | April 7, 1874 | term ended |
| John T. Hoffman | January 1, 1869 | ex officio as governor | December 31, 1872 | term ended |
| Allen C. Beach | January 1, 1869 | ex officio as lieutenant governor | December 31, 1872 | term ended |
| John Augustus Griswold | April 29, 1869 | replaced Isaac Parks | October 31, 1872 | died |
| Francis Kernan | February 10, 1870 | replaced Samuel Luckey | September 7, 1892 | died |
| Oswald Ottendorfer | April 14, 1870 | replaced Gulian C. Verplanck | 1873 | resigned |
| John L. Lewis | February 8, 1871 | replaced Gideon Hawley | 1890 | died |
| Horatio G. Warner | February 8, 1871 | replaced Robert Campbell | February 12, 1876 | died |
| G. Hilton Scribner | January 1, 1872 | ex officio as secretary of state | December 31, 1873 | term ended |
| Henry R. Pierson | April 24, 1872 | replaced Erastus Corning | January 1, 1890 | died |
| John Adams Dix | January 1, 1873 | ex officio as governor | December 31, 1874 | term ended |
| John C. Robinson | January 1, 1873 | ex officio as lieutenant governor | December 31, 1874 | term ended |
| Martin I. Townsend | April 24, 1873 | replaced John Augustus Griswold | March 8, 1903 | died |
| James W. Booth | May 14, 1873 | replaced Oswald Ottendorfer | September 14, 1876 | died |
| Diedrich Willers Jr. | January 1, 1874 | ex officio as secretary of state | December 31, 1875 | term ended |
| Anson Judd Upson | February 11, 1874 | replaced Alexander S. Johnson | June 15, 1902 | died |
| Neil Gilmour | April 7, 1874 | ex officio as superintendent of public instruction | April 7, 1883 | term ended |
| Samuel J. Tilden | January 1, 1875 | ex officio as governor | December 31, 1876 | term ended |
| William Dorsheimer | January 1, 1875 | ex officio as lieutenant governor | December 31, 1879 | term ended |
| John Bigelow | January 1, 1876 | ex officio as secretary of state | December 31, 1877 | term ended |
| Augustus C. George | March 9, 1876 | replaced William H. Goodwin | 1877 | resigned |
| William L. Bostwick | March 9, 1876 | replaced Horatio G. Warner | September 22, 1896 | died |
| John Adams Dix | March 29, 1876 | replaced Prosper M. Wetmore | 1877 | resigned |
| Lucius Robinson | January 1, 1877 | ex officio as governor | December 31, 1879 | term ended |
| Chauncey M. Depew | January 31, 1877 | replaced James W. Booth | March 31, 1904 | legislated out of office |
| Charles E. Fitch | January 31, 1877 | replaced George R. Perkins | March 31, 1904 | legislated out of office |
| Orris H. Warren | April 11, 1877 | replaced Augustus C. George | November 23, 1901 | died |
| Allen C. Beach | January 1, 1878 | ex officio as secretary of state | December 31, 1879 | term ended |
| Leslie W. Russell | January 17, 1878 | replaced John V. L. Pruyn | September 1891 | resigned |
| Whitelaw Reid | January 17, 1878 | replaced John Adams Dix | March 31, 1904 | legislated out of office |
| Charles Emory Smith | January 22, 1879 | replaced Robert G. Rankin | 1880 | resigned |
| Alonzo B. Cornell | January 1, 1880 | ex officio as governor | December 31, 1882 | term ended |
| George G. Hoskins | January 1, 1880 | ex officio as lieutenant governor | December 31, 1882 | term ended |
| Joseph B. Carr | January 1, 1880 | ex officio as secretary of state | December 31, 1885 | term ended |
| William H. Watson | February 2, 1881 | replaced Erastus C. Benedict | March 31, 1904 | legislated out of office |
| Henry E. Turner | February 2, 1881 | replaced Charles Emory Smith | March 31, 1904 | legislated out of office |
| Grover Cleveland | January 1, 1883 | ex officio as governor | January 6, 1865 | resigned |
| David B. Hill | January 1, 1883 | ex officio as lieutenant governor | January 6, 1885 | became Governor |
| David B. Hill | January 6, 1885 | ex officio as governor | December 31, 1891 | term ended |
| St. Clair McKelway | January 10, 1883 | replaced Robert S. Hale | March 31, 1904 | legislated out of office |
| William B. Ruggles | April 7, 1883 | ex officio as superintendent of public instruction | January 1, 1886 | resigned |
| Dennis McCarthy | January 6, 1885 | ex officio as acting lieutenant governor | December 31, 1885 | term ended |
| Hamilton Harris | March 18, 1885 | replaced J. Carson Brevoort | December 14, 1900 | died |
| Daniel Beach | March 18, 1885 | replaced Lorenzo Burrows | March 31, 1904 | legislated out of office |
| James E. Morrison | January 1, 1886 | ex officio as acting superintendent of public instruction | April 7, 1886 | term ended |
| Frederick Cook | January 1, 1886 | ex officio as secretary of state | December 31, 1889 | term ended |
| Edward F. Jones | January 1, 1886 | ex officio as lieutenant governor | December 31, 1891 | term ended |
| Willard A. Cobb | February 2, 1886 | replaced George W. Clinton | 1895 | resigned |
| Andrew S. Draper | April 7, 1886 | ex officio as superintendent of public instruction | April 7, 1892 | term ended |
| Carroll E. Smith | January 24, 1888 | replaced Elias W. Leavenworth | August 21, 1903 | died |
| Frank Rice | January 1, 1890 | ex officio as secretary of state | December 31, 1893 | term ended |
| Pliny T. Sexton | April 15, 1890 | replaced John L. Lewis | March 31, 1904 | legislated out of office |
| T. Guilford Smith | April 15, 1890 | replaced Henry R. Pierson | March 31, 1904 | legislated out of office |
| Roswell P. Flower | January 1, 1892 | ex officio as governor | December 31, 1894 | term ended |
| William F. Sheehan | January 1, 1892 | ex officio as lieutenant governor | December 31, 1894 | term ended |
| William Croswell Doane | February 10, 1892 | replaced Leslie W. Russell | March 31, 1904 | legislated out of office |
| James F. Crooker | April 7, 1892 | ex officio as superintendent of public instruction | April 7, 1895 | term ended |
| Francis McNeirny | April 10, 1893 | replaced Francis Kernan | January 2, 1894 | died |
| Lewis A. Stimson | April 10, 1893 | replaced George William Curtis | March 31, 1904 | legislated out of office |
| John Palmer | January 1, 1894 | ex officio as secretary of state | December 31, 1898 | term ended |
| Sylvester Malone | March 29, 1894 | replaced Francis McNeirny | December 29, 1899 | died |
| Levi P. Morton | January 1, 1895 | ex officio as governor | December 31, 1896 | term ended |
| Charles T. Saxton | January 1, 1895 | ex officio as lieutenant governor | December 31, 1896 | term ended |
| Charles R. Skinner | April 7, 1895 | ex officio as superintendent of public instruction | March 31, 1904 | legislated out of office |
| Albert Vander Veer | February 13, 1895 | replaced Willard A. Cobb | March 31, 1904 | legislated out of office |
| Frank S. Black | January 1, 1897 | ex officio as governor | December 31, 1898 | term ended |
| Timothy L. Woodruff | January 1, 1897 | ex officio as lieutenant governor | December 31, 1902 | term ended |
| Chester S. Lord | January 20, 1897 | replaced William L. Bostwick | March 31, 1904 | legislated out of office |
| Theodore Roosevelt | January 1, 1899 | ex officio as governor | December 31, 1900 | term ended |
| John T. McDonough | January 1, 1899 | ex officio as secretary of state | December 31, 1902 | term ended |
| Thomas A. Hendrick | April 3, 1900 | replaced Sylvester Malone | 1904 | resigned |
| Benjamin B. Odell Jr. | January 1, 1901 | ex officio as governor | March 31, 1904 | legislated out of office |
| Robert C. Pruyn | February 13, 1901 | replaced Hamilton Harris | March 31, 1904 | legislated out of office |
| William Nottingham | February 27, 1902 | replaced Orris H. Warren | March 31, 1904 | legislated out of office |
| Frank W. Higgins | January 1, 1903 | ex officio as lieutenant governor | March 31, 1904 | legislated out of office |
| John F. O'Brien | January 1, 1903 | ex officio as secretary of state | March 31, 1904 | legislated out of office |
| Charles A. Gardiner | January 21, 1903 | replaced Anson Judd Upson | March 31, 1904 | legislated out of office |
| Charles Spencer Francis | April 22, 1903 | replaced Martin I. Townsend | March 31, 1904 | legislated out of office |
| Eugene A. Philbin | March 2, 1904 | replaced Carroll E. Smith | March 31, 1904 | legislated out of office |
| Edward Lauterbach | March 2, 1904 | replaced Thomas A. Hendrick | March 31, 1904 | legislated out of office |

=== Regents Sworn in Since the April 1, 1904 reconfiguration ===
| Regent | Entered office | Notes | Left office | Notes | Judicial District |
|---|---|---|---|---|---|
| Eugene A. Philbin | April 1, 1904 | appointed to serve 5 years | April 17, 1913 | resigned | 1st |
| St. Clair McKelway | April 1, 1904 | appointed to serve 2 years | July 16, 1915 | died | 2nd |
| Charles Spencer Francis | April 1, 1904 | appointed to serve 11 years | April 20, 1906 | resigned | 3rd |
| Albert Vander Veer | April 1, 1904 | appointed to serve 1 year | April 1, 1905 | term ended | 3rd |
| Albert Vander Veer | April 25, 1906 | replaced Charles Spencer Francis | February 9, 1927 | term ended | 3rd |
| William Nottingham | April 1, 1904 | appointed to serve 3 years | January 23, 1921 | died | 5th |
| Daniel Beach | April 1, 1904 | appointed to serve 4 years | February 22, 1913 | died | 6th |
| Pliny T. Sexton | April 1, 1904 | appointed to serve 10 years | September 5, 1924 | died | 7th |
| T. Guilford Smith | April 1, 1904 | appointed to serve 8 years | February 21, 1912 | died | 8th |
| Charles A. Gardiner | April 1, 1904 | appointed to serve 6 years | April 23, 1909 | died | At Large Seat 1 |
| Edward Lauterbach | April 1, 1904 | appointed to serve 7 years | March 31, 1911 | term ended | At Large Seat 2 |
| Whitelaw Reid | April 1, 1904 | appointed to serve 9 years | December 15, 1912 | died | At Large Seat 3 |
| Lucian L. Shedden | April 1, 1905 | replaced Albert Vander Veer | January 17, 1912 | died | 4th |
| Francis M. Carpenter | April 1, 1909 | seat added | May 12, 1919 | died | 9th |
| Chester S. Lord | April 28, 1909 | replaced Charles A. Gardiner | August 1, 1933 | died | At Large Seat 1 |
| Abram I. Elkus | April 1, 1911 | replaced Edward Lauterbach | November 24, 1919 | resigned | At Large Seat 2 |
| Lucius N. Littauer | February 14, 1912 | replaced Lucian L. Shedden | February 26, 1914 | resigned | 4th |
| Adelbert Moot | April 1, 1912 | replaced T. Guilford Smith | September 12, 1929 | died | 8th |
| Charles B. Alexander | February 12, 1913 | replaced Whitelaw Reid | February 7, 1927 | died | At Large Seat 3 |
| Andrew J. Shipman | May 1913 | replaced Eugene A. Philbin | October 17, 1915 | died | 1st |
| John D. Moore | March 26, 1913 | replaced Daniel Beach | March 31, 1919 | term ended | 6th |
| Walter Guest Kellogg | March 10, 1914 | replaced Lucius N. Littauer | October 17, 1929 | resigned | 4th |
| William Berri | February 8, 1916 | replaced St. Clair McKelway | April 19, 1917 | died | 2nd |
| James Byrne | February 8, 1916 | replaced Andrew J. Shipman | July 30, 1937 | Resigned | 1st |
| Herbert L. Bridgman | May 2, 1917 | replaced William Berri | September 24, 1924 | died | 2nd |
| Thomas J. Mangan | April 1, 1919 | replaced John Moore | May 19, 1947 | term ended | 6th |
| William J. Wallin | February 12, 1920 | replaced Francis M. Carpenter | March 31, 1957 | retired | 9th |
| William A. Bondy | February 12, 1920 | replaced Abram I. Elkus | March 31, 1935 | term ended | At Large Seat 2 |
| William P. Baker | February 9, 1921 | replaced William Nottingham | January 8, 1930 | died | 5th |
| Robert W. Higbie | February 11, 1925 | replaced Herbert L. Bridgman | June 20, 1936 | died | 2nd |
| Roland B. Woodward | February 11, 1925 | replaced Pliny T. Sexton | December 27, 1946 | died | 7th |
| Florence Gibb Pratt | March 17, 1929 | replaced Charles B. Alexander; First woman regent | January 2, 1935 | died | At Large Seat 3 |
| William Leland Thompson | February 9, 1927 | Replaced Albert Vander Veer | March 31, 1951 | term ended | 3rd |
| John Lord O'Brian | February 12, 1930 | replaced Adelbert Mort | October 21, 1946 | resigned | 8th |
| Grant C. Madill | February 12, 1930 | replaced Walter Guest Kellogg | March 26, 1943 | resigned | 4th |
| George Hopkins Bond | April 1, 1930 | replaced William P. Baker | February 5, 1953 | resigned | 5th |
| Owen D. Young | February 14, 1934 | replaced Chester S. Lord | March 31, 1946 | term ended | At Large Seat 1 |
| Susan Brandeis Gilbert | February 13, 1935 | replaced Florence Gibb Pratt | March 31, 1949 | term ended | At Large Seat 3 |
| Christopher C. Mollenhauer | April 1, 1935 | replaced William Bondy | March 31, 1947 | term ended | At Large Seat 2 |
| George J. Ryan | February 10, 1937 | replaced Robert W. Higbie | March 31, 1941 | term ended | 2nd |
| Gordon Knox Bell | February 9, 1938 | replaced James Byrne | April 1, 1944 | term ended | 1st |
| W. Kingsland Macy | April 1, 1941 | replaced George J. Ryan | March 31, 1948 | new seat created | 2nd |
| W. Kingsland Macy | March 31, 1948 | seat added | March 31, 1953 | term ended | 10th |
| John P. Myers | February 9, 1944 | replaced Grant C. Madill | March 31, 1957 | year of his 70th birthday | 4th |
| Stanley Brady | April 1, 1944 | replaced Gordon Knox Bell | December 31, 1948 | resigned | 1st |
| Edward R. Eastman | April 1, 1946 | replaced Owen D. Young | March 31, 1956 | year of his 70th birthday | At Large Seat 1 |
| Welles V. Moot | February 12, 1947 | replaced John Lord O'Brian | March 31, 1956 | year of his 70th birthday | 8th |
| Caroline Werner Gannett | February 12, 1947 | replaced Roland B. Woodward | March 31, 1964 | resigned | 7th |
| Roger W. Straus | April 1, 1947 | replaced Christopher C. Mollenhauer | July 28, 1957 | died | At Large Seat 2 |
| George L. Hinman | February 11, 1948 | replaced Thomas J. Mangan | September 13, 1950 | resigned | 6th |
| Dominick F. Maurillo | March 3, 1948 | replaced W. Kingsland Macy | September 7, 1962 | resigned | 2nd |
| John F. Brosnan | February 9, 1949 | Replaced Stanley Brady | April 1, 1961 | year of his 70th birthday | 1st |
| Jacob L. Holtzmann | April 1, 1949 | replaced Susan Brandeis Gilbert | March 31, 1958 | year of his 70th birthday | At Large Seat 3 |
| Edgar W. Couper | February 14, 1951 | replaced George L. Hinman | April 1, 1968 | retired | 6th |
| Alexander J. Allan Jr. | February 14, 1951 | replaced William Leland Thompson | April 1, 1978 | term ended | 3rd |
| Elwyn L. Smith | February 25, 1953 | replaced George Hopkins Bond | April 1, 1954 | term ended | 5th |
| Cornelius W. Wickersham | April 1, 1953 | seat added | March 31, 1955 | year of his 70th birthday | 10th |
| Thad L. Collum | April 1, 1954 | replaced Elwyn L. Smith | January 31, 1967 | term ended | 5th |
| George L. Hubbell Jr. | April 1, 1955 | replaced Cornelius W. Wickersham | March 31, 1965 | year of his 70th birthday | 10th |
| T. Norman Hurd | April 1, 1956 | replaced Edward R. Eastman | December 12, 1958 | resigned | At Large Seat 1 |
| Charles W. Millard Jr. | April 1, 1956 | replaced Welles V. Moot | March 31, 1974 | year of his 70th birthday | 8th |
| Chester H. Lang | April 1, 1957 | replaced John P. Myers | June 15, 1961 | died | 4th |
| Everett J. Penny | April 1957 | replaced William J. Wallin | March 31, 1974 | year of his 70th birthday | 9th |
| Carl H. Pforzheimer Jr. | February 12, 1958 | replaced Roger W. Straus | March 31, 1978 | year of his 70th birthday | At Large Seat 2 |
| Edward M. M. Warburg | April 1, 1958 | replaced Jacob L. Holtzmann | March 31, 1975 | term ended | At Large Seat 3 |
| J. Carlton Corwith | February 3, 1959 | replaced T. Norman Hurd | December 7, 1966 | died | At Large Seat 1 |
| Allen D. Marshall | February 6, 1961 | replaced Chester H. Lang | March 31, 1965 | term ended | 4th |
| Joseph W. McGovern | February 7, 1961 | replaced John F. Brosnan | March 31, 1975 | resigned | 1st |
| Joseph T. King | February 4, 1963 | seat added | March 1, 1974 | resigned | 11th |
| Joseph T. King | March 31, 1974 | replaced Max J. Rubin | March 31, 1976 | retired | At Large Seat 4 |
| Paul R. Falco | April 3, 1963 | replaced Dominick F. Maurillo | May 1, 1963 | died | 2nd |
| Joseph C. Indelicato | February 4, 1964 | replaced Paul Falco | March 31, 1977 | resigned | 2nd |
| Helen B. Power | April 1, 1964 | replaced Caroline Werner Gannett | March 10, 1975 | resigned | 7th |
| Francis W. McGinley | March 30, 1965 | replaced Allen D Marshall | March 31, 1976 | year of his 70th birthday | 4th |
| John I. Snyder | April 1, 1965 | replaced George L. Hubboll Jr. | March 31, 1966 | term ended | 10th |
| George D. Weinstein | June 23, 1965 | replaced John I. Snyder | March 5, 1969 | died | 10th |
| Max J. Rubin | June 23, 1965 | seat added | June 3, 1973 | resigned | At Large Seat 4 |
| Kenneth B. Clark | February 8, 1966 | replaced J. Carlton Corwith; first African-American regent | March 31, 1986 | term ended | At Large Seat 1 |
| Stephen Kemp Bailey | February 21, 1967 | replaced Thad Collum | April 30, 1973 | resigned | 5th |
| Harold E. Newcomb | February 3, 1969 | replaced Edward Couper | March 31, 1982 | year of his 70th birthday | 6th |
| Theodore Michael Black | April 23, 1969 | replaced George D. Weinstein | April 1, 1980 | retired | 10th |
| Willard A. Genrich | April 1, 1973 | replaced Charles W. Millard Jr. | March 31, 1995 | Removed by legislature | 8th |
| Emlyn I. Griffith | May 23, 1973 | replaced Stephen Kemp Bailey | March 31, 1996 | retired | 5th |
| Genevieve Sanchez Klein | March 26, 1974 | replaced Joseph T. King | April 1, 1977 | term ended | 11th |
| William Jovanovich | March 31, 1974 | replaced Everett J. Penny | March 31, 1977 | resigned | 9th |
| Mary Alice Kendall | April 1, 1975 | replaced Helen B. Power; nomination was contested | March 31, 1983 | term ended | 7th |
| Louis E. Yavner | April 1, 1975 | Edward M. M. Warburg; nomination was contested | March 31, 1981 | resigned | At Large Seat 3 |
| Laura Bradley Chodos | April 1, 1976 | replaced Francis W. McGinley | March 31, 1993 | term ended | 4th |
| Joseph R. Bongiorno | April 1, 1977 | replaced Joseph C. Indelicato | May 3, 1980 | died | 2nd |
| Martin C. Barell | April 1, 1976 | replaced Joseph W. King | January 13, 1993 | died | At Large Seat 4 |
| Louise P. Matteoni | March 31, 1977 | replaced Genevieve Sanchez Klein | March 31, 1998 | term ended | 11th |
| Jorge L. Batista | April 1, 1975 | replaced Joseph W. McGovern; nomination was contested | March 1, 1983 | term ended | 1st |
| Jorge L. Batista | April 1, 1983 | seat added | March 31, 1998 | term ended | 12th |
| J. Edward Meyer | March 8, 1977 | replaced William Jovanovich; longest serving regent | March 31, 2000 | retired | 9th |
| Arlene B. Reed-Delaney | April 5, 1978 | replaced Alexander J. Allan Jr.; First African-American woman | September 30, 1980 | resigned | 3rd |
| R. Carlos Carballada | April 5, 1978 | replaced Carl H. Pforzheimer Jr | March 31, 1999 | term ended | At Large Seat 2 |
| Floyd S. Linton | April 1, 1980 | replaced Theodore Michael Black | March 31, 1995 | Removed by legislature | 10th |
| Mimi Levin Lieber | May 19, 1981 | replaced Louis E. Yavner | March 31, 1995 | term ended | At Large Seat 3 |
| Shirley C. Brown | May 19, 1981 | replaced Arlene B. Reed-Delaney | July 20, 1995 | resigned | 3rd |
| Salvatore J. Sclafani | May 19, 1981 | replaced Joseph R. Bongiorno | March 31, 1988 | term ended | 2nd |
| Adelaide L. Sanford | March 25, 1986 | replaced Kenneth B. Clark | March 31, 2007 | retired | At Large Seat 1 |
| Thomas Frey | April 1, 1983 | replaced Mary Alice Kendall | December 31, 1987 | resigned | 7th |
| Norma Gluck | March 31, 1983 | seat added (district reconfigured) | March 31, 1997 | term ended | 1st |
| Robert M. Best | April 1, 1982 | replaced Harold Newcomb | January 8, 1984 | resigned | Binghamton |
| Walter Cooper | April 1, 1988 | replaced Thomas Frey | March 31, 1997 | retired | 7th |
| Gerald J. Lustig | April 1, 1988 | replaced Salvatore J. Sclafani | February 11, 1991 | died | 2nd |
| Carl T. Hayden | March 31, 1990 | replaced James McCabe, Sr. | March 31, 2002 | retired | 6th |
| Diane O’Neill McGivern | March 31, 1991 | replaced Gerald J. Lustig | March 31, 2005 | retired | 2nd |
| Saul B. Cohen | March 1, 1993 | replaced Martin C. Barell | December 1, 2010 | retired | At Large Seat 4 |
| James C. Dawson | March 1, 1993 | Laura Bradley Chodos | March 31, 2015 | term ended | 4th |
| Robert M. Bennett | April 1, 1995 | replaced William Genrich | March 31, 2015 | term ended | 8th |
| Robert M. Johnson | April 1, 1995 | replaced Floyd S. Linton | May 15, 2004 | resigned | 10th |
| Peter M. Pryor | April 1, 1996 | replaced Shirley C. Brown | March 31, 1999 | retired | 3rd |
| Anthony S. Bottar | April 5, 1996 | replaced Emlyn Griffith | March 31, 2016 | term ended | 5th |
| Merryl Tisch | April 1, 1996 | replaced Mimi Levin Lieber | March 31, 2016 | retired | At Large Seat 3 |
| Harold O. Levy | April 1, 1997 | replaced Norma Gluck | January 1, 2000 | resigned | 1st |
| Ena L. Farley | April 1, 1997 | replaced Walter Cooper | March 31, 2002 | term ended | 7th |
| Geraldine D. Chapey | April 1, 1998 | replaced Louise Matteoni | November 1, 2014 | resigned | 11th |
| Ricardo E. Oquendo | April 1, 1998 | replaced Jorge L. Batista | March 31, 2000 | resigned | 12th |
| Arnold B. Gardner | April 1, 1999 | replaced R. Carlos Carballada | March 31, 2009 | term ended | At Large Seat 2 |
| Eleanor Powell Bartlett | April 1, 1999 | replaced Peter M. Pryor | July 15, 2000 | resigned | 3rd |
| Charlotte K. Frank | April 1, 2000 | replaced Harold O. Levy | March 31, 2002 | term ended | 1st |
| Harry Phillips III | April 1, 2000 | replaced J. Edward Meyer | March 31, 2014 | retired | 9th |
| Lorraine Cortes-Vazquez | April 1, 2001 | replaced Ricardo E. Oquendo | December 31, 2007 | resigned | 12th |
| Joseph E. Bowman | April 1, 2001 | replaced Eleanor Powell Bartlett | June 15, 2010 | resigned | 3rd |
| Milton L. Cofield | April 1, 2002 | replaced Ena L. Farley | March 31, 2011 | term ended | 7th |
| James R. Tallon Jr. | April 1, 2002 | replaced Carl Hayden | March 31, 2017 | term ended | 6th |
| Judith O. Rubin | April 1, 2002 | replaced Charlotte K. Frank | December 31, 2003 | resigned | 1st |
| John Brademas | April 1, 2004 | replaced Judith O. Rubin | March 31, 2007 | term ended | 1st |
| Carol Bellamy | April 1, 2005 | replaced Diane O’Neill McGivern | February 2006 (?) | resigned | 2nd |
| Roger B. Tilles | April 1, 2005 | replaced Robert M. Johnson | March 31, 2025 | term ended | 10th |
| Karen Brooks Hopkins | April 1, 2006 | replaced Carol Bellamy | March 31, 2011 | term ended | 2nd |
| Charles R. Bendit | April 1, 2007 | replaced John Brademas | April 1, 2016 | resigned | 1st |
| Natalie Gomez-Velez | April 1, 2007 | replaced Lorraine Cortes-Vazquez | March 31, 2008 | term ended | 12th |
| Lester W. Young Jr. | May 6, 2008 | replaced Adelaide L. Sanford | March 31, 2030 | currently serving | At Large Seat 1 |
| Betty A. Rosa | April 1, 2008 | replaced Natalie Gomez-Hopkins | August 1, 2020 | resigned | 12th |
| Christine D. Cea | April 1, 2009 | seat added | March 31, 2029 | currently serving | 13th |
| Wade S. Norwood | April 1, 2009 | replaced Arnold B. Gardner | March 31, 2029 | currently serving | At Large Seat 2 |
| James O. Jackson | April 1, 2011 | replaced Joseph E. Bowman | March 10, 2014 | resigned | 3rd |
| Kathleen M. Cashin | April 1, 2011 | replaced Karen Brooks Hopkins | March 31, 2025 | term ended | 2nd |
| James Edward Cottrell | April 1, 2011 | replaced Saul B. Cohen | | term ended | At Large Seat 4 |
| T. Andrew Brown | April 1, 2012 | replaced Milton L. Cofield | March 31, 2022 | resigned | 7th |
| Josephine Finn | March 11, 2014 | replaced James O. Jackson | March 31, 2024 | term ended | 3rd |
| Judith Chin | March 10, 2015 | replaced Geraldine Chapey; first Asian-American regent | March 31, 2028 | currently serving | 11th |
| Beverly L. Ouderkirk | March 10, 2015 | replaced James C. Dawson | March 29, 2022 | died | 4th |
| Catherine Collins | March 10, 2015 | replaced Robert Bennett | March 31, 2025 | term ended | 8th |
| Judith Johnson | April 1, 2015 | replaced Henry Phillips III | October 23, 2019 | died | 9th |
| Nan Eileen Mead | March 8, 2016 | replaced Charles R. Bendit | March 31, 2022 | term ended | 1st |
| Elizabeth Smith Hakanson | April 1, 2016 | replaced Anthony Bottar | March 31, 2026 | term ended | 5th |
| Luis O. Reyes | April 1, 2016 | replaced Meryl Tisch | | | At Large Seat 3 |
| Susan W. Mittler | April 1, 2017 | replaced James Tallon Jr. | March 21, 2027 | currently serving | 6th |
| Frances Wills | April 1, 2020 | replaced Judith Johnson | March 31, 2030 | currently serving | 9th |
| Ruth B Turner | March 2, 2021 | replaced T. Andrew Brown | January 4, 2023 | resigned | 7th |
| Aramina Vega Ferrer | March 2, 2001 | replaced Betty A. Rosa | March 31, 2028 | currently serving | 12th |
| Shino Tanikawa | March 31, 2022 | replaced Nan Eileen Mead | March 31, 2027 | currently serving | 1st |
| Roger Catania | June 2, 2022 | replaced Beverly L. Ouderkirk | March 31, 2030 | currently serving | 4th |
| Adrian I. Hale | March 1, 2023 | replaced Ruth B. Turner | March 1, 2027 | currently serving | 7th |
| Brian Krist | March 4, 2025 | | March 31, 2029 | currently serving | At Large |
| Janice Weinman Shorenstein | February 25, 2026 | | March 31, 2031 | currently serving | At Large |
| Hasoni L. Pratts | March 1, 2024 | replaced Kathleen M. Cashin | March 31, 2030 | currently serving | 2nd |
| Seema Rivera | April 1, 2024 | replace Josephine Finn | March 31, 2029 | currently serving | 3rd |
| Patrick A. Mannion | March 1, 2024 | replaced Elizabeth S. Hakanson | March 31, 2029 | currently serving | 5th |
| Keith B. Wiley | March 1, 2025 | replaced Catherine Collins | March 31, 2030 | currently serving | 8th |
| Felicia Thomas-Williams | March 1, 2025 | replaced Roger B. Tilles | March 31, 2030 | currently serving | 10th |

== Chancellors ==
- George Clinton, 1784–1785, 1787–1795
- John Jay, 1796–1801
- George Clinton, 1801–1804
- Morgan Lewis, 1805–1807
- Daniel D. Tompkins, 1808–1817
- John Tayler, 1817–1829
- Simeon De Witt, 1829–1834
- Stephen Van Rensselaer, 1835–1839
- James King, 1839–1841
- Peter Wendell, 1842–1849
- Gerrit Y. Lansing, 1849–1862
- John V. L. Pruyn, 1862–1877
- Erastus C. Benedict, 1878–1880
- Henry R. Pierson, 1881–1890
- George William Curtis, 1890–1892
- Anson Judd Upson, 1892–1902
- William Croswell Doane, 1902–1904
- Whitelaw Reid, 1904–1912
- St. Clair McKelway, 1913–1915
- Pliny T. Sexton, 1915–1921
- Albert Vander Veer, 1921
- Chester S. Lord, 1921–1933
- James Byrne, 1933–1937
- Thomas J. Mangan, 1937–1945
- William John Wallin, 1945–1950
- John Platt Myers, 1951–1957
- Roger Straus, 1957
- John F. Brosnan, 1957–1961
- Edgar W. Couper, 1961–1968
- Joseph W. McGovern, 1968–1975
- Theodore M. Black, 1975–1980
- Willard A. Genrich, 1980–1985
- Martin C. Barell, 1985–1992
- R. Carlos Carballada, 1991–1995
- Carl T. Hayden, 1995–2002
- Robert M. Bennett, 2002–2009
- Merryl Tisch, 2009–2016 (first female chancellor)
- Betty A. Rosa 2016–2020 (first Latina/Hispanic chancellor)
- T. Andrew Brown 2020–2021
- Lester W. Young Jr. 2021–present
