= James Cottrell =

James Cottrell may refer to:

- James Edward Cottrell, American anesthesiologist
- James L. F. Cottrell, U.S. representative from Alabama
- Jim Cottrell, American football linebacker
