= James Edward Cottrell =

American neuroanesthesiologist

- Born: James Edward Cottrell; West Virginia, U.S.
- Education: M.D. West Virginia University; B.S. Morris Harvey College
- Known for: Neuroanesthesiology
- Spouse: Joseph Lovett

James Edward Cottrell is the Chair Emeritus, Department of Anesthesiology at SUNY Downstate Medical Center in New York City. He serves as a member of the New York State Board of Regents and is an avid collector of contemporary fine art.

Dr. Cottrell helped to found the subspecialty of neuroanesthesiology, a field of medicine that has refined and expanded clinical practice and increased patient safety.

== Honors ==
- 2016 Leadership Award from the Arthur Ashe Institute for Urban Health
- 2010 Elite Distinguished Service Award from the American Society of Anesthesiologists
- 2007 Rovenstine Lecturer, American Society of Anesthesiologists
- 2005 Fellow, Royal College of Anaesthetists
- 2003 President, American Society of Anesthesiologists
- 2003 Honorary Member, German Society of Anaesthesiology and Intensive Care Medicine
- 1993 Honorary Member, Belgian Society for Anaesthesia and Reanimation
- 1988 Editor-in-Chief, Journal of Neurosurgical Anesthesiology

== Community service ==
- 2001 Vice Chairman, Board of Directors, Doctors of the World
- 1989 Chairman and Founding Member, AIDS Action Foundation
- Board of Directors, God's Love We Deliver

== Books ==
- "Cottrell and Patel's Neuroanesthesia" (with Sulpicio Soriano, 520 pages, Elsevier, 7th edition 2024, ISBN 0323932738)
- "Anesthesia without Fear: The Informed Consumer's Guide to Safe Surgery and Chronic Pain Relief" (with Stephanie Golden, 364 pages, Good Outcomes Press, 1st edition 2022, ISBN 979-8218075682)
- "Cottrell and Patel's Neuroanesthesia" (with Piyush Patel MD, 520 pages, Elsevier, 6th edition 2016, ISBN 0323359442)
- "Handbook of Neuroanesthesia" (with Philippa Newfield, 480 pages, Lippincott Williams & Wilkins, 5th edition, 2012, ISBN 1605479659)
- "Cottrell and Young's Neuroanesthesia" (with William L. Young, 480 pages, Mosby-Year Book, 5th edition, 2010, ISBN 0323059082)
- "Anesthesia and Neurosurgery" (with William L. Young, Elsevier, 5th edition, 2009)
- "Handbook of Neuroanesthesia" (with Philippa Newfield, 448 pages, Lippincott Williams & Wilkins, 4th edition, 2006, ISBN 0781762456)
- "Anesthesia and Neurosurgery" (with David S. Smith, 860 pages, Mosby-Year Book, 4th edition, 2001, ISBN 0815103212)
- "Under the Mask" (with Stephanie Golden, 294 pages, Rutgers University Press, 1st edition, 2001, ISBN 081352878X)
- "Handbook of Neuroanesthesia" (with Paul Henry Young & John A. Mcculloch, 431 pages, Lippincott Williams & Wilkins, 3rd edition, 1999, ISBN 0781716071)
- "Anesthesia and Neurosurgery" (with David S. Smith, 798 pages, Mosby-Year Book, 3rd edition, 1994, ISBN 0801665736)
- "Handbook of Neuroanesthesia" (with Philippa Newfield, 458 pages, Lippincott Williams & Wilkins, 2nd edition, 1991, ISBN 0316604712)
- "Anesthesia and Neurosurgery" (with Herman Turndorf, 530 pages, Mosby-Year Book, 2nd edition, 1986, ISBN 0801611636)
- "Handbook of Neuroanesthesia" (with Philippa Newfield, 437 pages, Little, Brown and Company, 1st edition, 1983, ISBN 0316604704)
- "Occupational Hazards to Operating and Recovery Room Personnel. International Anesthesiology Clinics. Vol. 19, No. 4 (Winter)." (183 pages, Little, Brown, and Company, 1981)
- "Anesthesia and Neurosurgery" (with Herman Turndorf, 443 pages, Mosby-Year Book, 1st edition, 1980, ISBN 0801610362)

== Publications ==
- Tsokas, P; Hsieh, C; Grau-Perales, A; Tcherepanov, A; Kwok, L; Rodriguez-Valencia, LM; Cano, DA; Allen, KD; Smith, H; Kubayeva, S; Wei, BJ; Sabzanov, S; Flores-Obando, RE; Ghosh, S; Bergold, PJ; Rudy, J; Cottrell, JE; Fenton, AA; Sacktor, TC (2026). "PKMζ-PKCι/λ double-knockout demonstrates atypical PKC is crucial for the persistence of hippocampal LTP and spatial memory". eLife. 1. doi:10.7554/eLife.110499.1.
- Tsokas, P; Hsieh, C; Yao, Y; Lesburguères, E; Wallace, ECJ; Tcherepanov, A; Jothianandan, J; Hartley, BR; Pan, L; Rivard, B; Farese, RV; Sajan, MP; Bergold, PJ; Hernández, AI; Cottrell, JE; Shouval, HZ; Fenton, AA; Sacktor, TC (2016). "Compensation for PKMζ in long-term potentiation and spatial long-term memory in mutant mice". eLife. 5 e14846. doi:10.7554/eLife.14846. PMC 4869915. PMID 27187150.
- Tsokas, P; Hsieh, C; Flores-Obando, R; Bernabo, M; Tcherepanov, A; Hernández, A; Thomas, C; Bergold, P; Cottrell, J; Sacktor, T (2024). "KIBRA anchoring the action of PKM∂ maintains the persistence of memory". Science Advances. 10 (26) eadl0030. doi:10.1126/sciadv.adl0030. PMC 11204205. PMID 38924398.
- Liu, J; Lin, D; Yau, A; Cottrell, JE; Kass, IS (2023). "Early-life propofol exposure does not affect later-life GABAergic inhibition, seizure induction, or social behavior". IBRO Neuroscience Reports. 14: 483–493. doi:10.1016/j.ibneur.2023.05.007. PMC 10220478. PMID 37252630.
- Lin, D; Liu, J; Florveus, A; Ganesan, V; Cottrell, JE; Kass, IS (2021). "Exposure to Sevoflurane, But Not Ketamine, During Early-life Brain Development has Long-Lasting Effects on GABAA Receptor Mediated Inhibitory Neurotransmission". Neuroscience. 472: 116–127. doi:10.1016/j.neuroscience.2021.08.001. PMID 34384844. S2CID 236955015.
- Cottrell, JE; Hartung, J. (2020). "Anesthesia and Cognitive Outcome in Elderly Patients: A Narrative Viewpoint". Journal of Neurosurgical Anesthesiology. 32 (1): 9–17. doi:10.1097/ANA.0000000000000640. PMC 6919225. PMID 31490337.
- Tsokas, P; Rivard, B; Hsieh, C; Cottrell, JE; Fenton, AA; Sacktor, TC (2019). "Antisense Oligodeoxynucleotide Perfusion Blocks Gene Expression of Synaptic Plasticity-Related Proteins without Inducing Compensation in Hippocampal Slices". Bio Protoc. 9 (19). doi:10.21769/BioProtoc.3387. PMC 6892586. PMID 31803793.
- Hsieh, C; Tsokas, P; Grau-Perales, A; Lesburguères, E; Bukai, J; Khanna, K; Chorny, J; Chung, A; Jou, C; Burghardt, NS; Denny, CA; Flores-Obando, RE; Hartley, BR; Valencia, LM; Hernández, AI; Bergold, PJ; Cottrell, JE; Alarcon, JM; Fenton, AA; Sacktor, TC (2020). "Persistent increases of PKMζ in memory-activated neurons trace LTP maintenance during spacial long-term memory storage". The European Journal of Neuroscience. 54 (8): 6795–6814. bioRxiv 10.1101/2020.02.05.936146. doi:10.1111/ejn.15137. PMC 8333175. PMID 33540466.
- Cottrell, James E. (2018). "Succinylcholine and Intracranial Pressure". Anesthesiology. 129 (6): 1159–1162. doi:10.1097/ALN.0000000000002429. PMID 30222601. S2CID 52291879.
- Lin, D; Liu, J; Hu, Z; Cottrell, JE; Kass, IS (2018). "Neonatal anesthesia exposure impacts brain microRNAs and their associated neurodevelopmental processes". Sci. Rep. 8 (1): 10656. Bibcode:2018NatSR...810656L. doi:10.1038/s41598-018-28874-0. PMC 6045579. PMID 30006558.
- Hsieh, C; Tsokas, P; Serrano, P; Hernández, AI; Tian, D; Cottrell, JE; Shouval, HZ; Fenton, AA; Sacktor, TC (2017). "Persistent increased PKMζ in long-term and remote spatial memory". Neurobiol. Learn. Mem. 138: 135–144. doi:10.1016/j.nlm.2016.07.008. PMC 5501180. PMID 27417578.
- Cottrell, JE; Hartung, J. (2016). "Ketamine versus Special K: a double-edged sword". Anesthesia and Analgesia. 122 (3): 586. doi:10.1213/ANE.0000000000001151. PMID 26836133.
- Lin, Daisy; Liu, Jinyang; Kramberg, Lea; Ruggiero, Andrea; Cottrell, James; Kass, Ira (2016). "Early-life single-episode sevoflurane exposure impairs social behavior and cognition later in life". Brain and Behavior. 6 (9): e00514. doi:10.1002/brb3.514. PMC 5036436. PMID 27688943.
- Wang, J; Meng, F; Cottrell, JE; Sacktor, TC; Kass, IS (2012). "Metabotropic actions of the volatile anesthetic sevoflurane increase PKM synthesis and induce immediate preconditioning protection of rat hippocampal slices". The Journal of Physiology. 590 (16): 4093–107. doi:10.1113/jphysiol.2012.233965. PMC 3476650. PMID 22674720.
- Popp, SS; Lei, B; Kelemen, E; Cottrell, JE; Kass, IS (2011). "Intravenous antiarrhythmic doses of lidocaine increase the survival rate of CA1 pyramidal neurons and improve cognitive outcome after transient global cerebral ischemia in rats". Neuroscience. 192: 537–549. doi:10.1016/j.neuroscience.2011.06.086. PMID 21777661. S2CID 43126163.
- Charchaflieh, J; Cottrell, JE; Kass, IS (2011). "Posthypoxic Moderate Hypothermia Improves Electrophysiological Recovery in the Rat Hippocampal Slice". Journal of Neurosurgical Anesthesiology. 23 (2): 146–9. doi:10.1097/ANA.0b013e31820592d1. PMID 21270645. S2CID 34762387.
- Lei, B; Popp, S; Cottrell, JE; Kass, IS (2009). "Effects of Midazolam on Brain Injury After Transient Focal Cerebral Ischemia in Rats". Journal of Neurosurgical Anesthesiology. 21 (2): 131–139. doi:10.1097/ANA.0b013e318191697a. PMID 19295392. S2CID 20204461.
- Wang, J; Cottrell, JE; Kass, IS (2009). "Effects of desflurane and propofol on electrophysiological parameters during and recovery after hypoxia in rat hippocampal slice CA1 pyramidal cells". Neuroscience. 160 (1): 140–148. doi:10.1016/j.neuroscience.2009.02.027. PMID 19236906. S2CID 33221488.
- Matei, G; Pavlik, R; McCadden, T; Cottrell, JE; Kass, IS (2002). "Sevoflurane Improves Electrophysiological Recovery of Rat Hippocampal Slice CA1 Pyramidal Neurons after Hypoxia". Journal of Neurosurgical Anesthesiology. 14 (4): 293–298. doi:10.1097/00008506-200210000-00004. PMID 12357086. S2CID 20172950.
- Lei, B; Cottrell, JE; Kass, IS (2001). "Neuroprotective effect of low-dose lidocaine in a rat model of transient focal cerebral ischemia". Anesthesiology. 95 (2): 445–51. doi:10.1097/00000542-200108000-00029. PMID 11506119. S2CID 14340688.
- Amorim, P; Cottrell, JE; Kass, IS (1999). "Effect of Small Changes in Temperature on CA1 Pyramidal Cells from Rat Hippocampal Slices during Hypoxia: Implications about the Mechanism of Hypothermic Protection Against Neuronal Damage". Brain Research. 844 (1–2): 143–149. doi:10.1016/s0006-8993(99)01944-7. PMID 10536270. S2CID 45268119.
- Wang, T; Susman, K; Wang, J; Cottrell, JE; Kass, IS (1999). "Thiopental Attenuates the Hypoxic Changes of Electrophysiology, Biochemistry, and Morphology in Rat Hippocampal Slice CA-1 Pyramidal Cells". Stroke. 30 (11): 2400–2407. doi:10.1161/01.str.30.11.2400. PMID 10548677.
- Charchaflieh, J; Cottrell, JE; Kass, IS (1998). "The Effect of Fentanyl on Electrophysiologic Recovery of CA1 Pyramidal Cells from Anoxia in the Rat Hippocampal Slice". Anesthesia and Analgesia. 87 (1): 68–71. doi:10.1097/00000539-199807000-00015. PMID 9661548. S2CID 542816.
- Amadeu, ME; Abramowicz, AE; Chambers, G; Cottrell, JE; Kass, IS (1998). "Etomidate Does Not Alter Recovery after Anoxia of Evoked Population from the CA1 Region of Rat Hippocampal Slices". Anesthesiology. 88 (5): 1274–1280. doi:10.1097/00000542-199805000-00019. PMID 9605688. S2CID 42126136.
- Amorim, P; Chambers, G; Cottrell, JE; Kass, IS (1997). "Nitrous Oxide Impairs Electrophysiological Recovery After Anoxia in Rat Hippocampal Slices". Anesthesiology. 87 (3): 642–651. doi:10.1097/00000542-199709000-00026. PMID 9316971. S2CID 25777558.
- Amorim, P; Chambers, G; Cottrell, JE; Kass, IS (1995). "Propofol Reduces Neuronal Transmission Damage and Attenuates the Changes in Ca, K and Na During Hyperthermic Anoxia in the Rat Hippocampal Slice". Anesthesiology. 83 (6): 1254–1265. doi:10.1097/00000542-199512000-00016. PMID 8533918. S2CID 12256521.
- Fried, E; Amorim, P; Chambers, G; Cottrell, JE; Kass, IS (1995). "The Importance of Sodium for Anoxic Damage in Rat Hippocompal Slices: Mechanisms of Protection by Lidocaine". Journal of Physiology. 2. 489 (Pt 2): 557–565. doi:10.1113/jphysiol.1995.sp021072. PMC 1156779. PMID 8847647.
- Kass, IS; Abramowicz, AE; Cottrell, JE; Chambers, G (1992). "The Barbiturate Thiopental Reduces ATP Levels During Anoxia But Improves Electrophysiological Recovery and Ionic Homeostasis in the Rat Hippocampal Slice". Neuroscience. 3. 49 (3): 537–543. doi:10.1016/0306-4522(92)90224-p. PMID 1501765. S2CID 24776654.
- Abramowicz, AE; Kass, IS; Chambers, G; Cottrell, JE (1991). "Midazolam Improves Electrophysiologic Recovery after Anoxia and Reduces the Changes in ATP Levels and Calcium Influx During Anoxia in the Rat Hippocampal Slice". Anesthesiology. 75 (6): 669–672. doi:10.1097/00000542-199106000-00021. PMID 2042764.
- Van Aken, H; Cottrell, JE; Anger, C; Puchstein, C (1989). "Treatment of Intraoperative Hypertensive Emergencies in Patients with Intracranial Disease. A Symposium: Acute Blood Pressure and the Brain". American Journal of Cardiology. 63 (6): 43C–47C. doi:10.1016/0002-9149(89)90406-2. PMID 2643855.
- Acosta, D; Kass, IS; Cottrell, JE; Chambers, G (1987). "The Effect of Alpha-tocopherol and Free Radicals on Anoxic Damage in the Rat Hippocampal Slice". Experimental Neurology. 97 (3): 161–166. doi:10.1016/0014-4886(87)90117-8. PMID 3622713. S2CID 54329571.
- Hartung, J; Cottrell, JE (1987). "Nitrous Oxide Reduces Thiopental-induced Prolongation of Survival in Hypoxic and Anoxic Mice". Anesthesia & Analgesia. 66 (1): 47–52. doi:10.1213/00000539-198701000-00008. PMID 3800018. S2CID 21931568.
- Giffin, JP; Hartung, J; Cottrell, JE; Capuano, C; Shwiry, B (1985). "Effect of Vecuronium on Intracranial Pressure, Mean Arterial Pressure, and Heart Rate in Cats". Br J Anaesth. 64 (4): 1001–1004. doi:10.1093/bja/58.4.441. PMID 2869775.
- Giffin, JP; Hartung, J; Cottrell, JE; Litwak, B; Capuano, C (1985). "Intracranial Pressure, Mean Arterial Pressure, and Heart Rate after Rapid Paralysis with Atracurium in Cats". Can Anaesth Soc J. 32 (6): 618–621. doi:10.1007/BF03011408. PMID 3841020.
- Cottrell, C; Giffin, JP; Hartung, J; Shwiry, B (1984). "Intracranial Pressure During Tetrodotoxin-induced Hypotension". Anesthesia & Analgesia. 63 (11): 1005–1009. doi:10.1213/00000539-198411000-00008. PMID 6496969. S2CID 28105262.
- Giffin, JP; Cottrell, JE; Shwiry, B; Hartung, J; Epstein, J; Lim, K (1984). "Intracranial Pressure, Mean Arterial Pressure, and Heart Rate Following Midazolam or Thiopental in Humans with Brain Tumors". Anesthesiology. 60 (5): 491–494. doi:10.1097/00000542-198405000-00021. PMID 6370042.
- Giffin, JP; Cottrell, JE; Hartung, J; Shwiry, B (1983). "Intracranial Pressure During Nifedipine-induced hypotension". Anesthesia & Analgesia. 52 (12): 1078–1080. PMID 6650891.
- Cottrell, JE; Hartung, JE; Giffin, JP; Shwiry, B (1983). "Intracranial and Hemodynamic Changes after Succinylcholine Administration in Cats". Anesthesia & Analgesia. 62 (11): 1006–1009. doi:10.1213/00000539-198311000-00009. PMID 6625204. S2CID 26163360.
- Casthely, PA; Lear, S; Cottrell, JE; Lear, E (1982). "Intrapulmonary Shunting During Anesthesia and Induced Hypotension". Anesthesia & Analgesia. 3. 61 (3): 231–235. doi:10.1213/00000539-198203000-00002. PMID 6802027.
- Cottrell, JE; Patel, KP; Casthely, PA; Marlin, A; Turndorf, H (1981). "Cerebrospinal fluid cyanide after nitroprusside infusion in man". Can Anaesth Soc J. 3. 28 (3): 228–231. doi:10.1007/BF03005505. PMID 7237215.
- Cottrell, JE; Gupta, B; Rappaport, H; Flamm, E (1980). "Intracranial Pressure During Nitroglycerin-induced Hypotension". Journal of Neurosurgery. 53 (3): 309–311. doi:10.3171/jns.1980.53.3.0309. PMID 6775054.
- Cottrell, JE; Casthely, PA; Brodie, JD; Patel, K; Klein, A; Turndorf, H (1979). "Prevention of Nitroprusside-induced Cyanide Toxicity with Hydroxocobalamin". N Engl J Med. 298 (15): 809–811. doi:10.1056/NEJM197804132981502. PMID 634316.
- Cottrell, JE; Patel, KP; Ransohoff, JR; Turndorf, H (1978). "Intracranial Pressure Changes Induced by Sodium Nitroprusside in Patients with Intracranial Mass Lesions". Journal of Neurosurgery. 48 (3): 324–31. doi:10.3171/jns.1978.48.3.0329. PMID 632856.
- Cottrell, JE; Robustelli, A; Post, K; Turndorf, H (1977). "Furosemide and Mannitol-induced Changes in Intracranial Pressure and Serum Osmolality and Electrolytes". Anesthesiology. 56 (1): 359–362. doi:10.1097/00000542-197707000-00006. PMID 869246.
- Cottrell, JE; Wolfson, B; Siker, ES (1978). "Changes in airway resistance following droperidol, hydroxyzine, and diazepam in normal volunteers". Anesthesia & Analgesia. 55 (1): 18–21. PMID 1108707.

== Art ==
Dr. Cottrell and his partner, Joseph Lovett, began collecting art in the 1970s and have built an exceptional collection of contemporary art. Their collection has a particular depth because they build relationships with artists and stick with them as their work develops. "As collectors, they're very involved in getting to know the artists they collect," says Orlando Museum of Art curator Hansen Mulford. In 2001 they were listed among Art & Antiques Top 100 Collectors.

Cottrell has served on the Director's Council of the Whitney Museum of American Art and on the Prix Marcel Duchamp and Guerlain Drawing Prize Selection Committees.

In 2021 a major gift from Dr. James Cottrell and Mr. Joseph Lovett of over 200 artworks was announced by Grey Art Gallery at New York University. A named Cottrell-Lovett Gallery and the creation of the Cottrell-Lovett Study Center were included in the announcement.
