= John Daniel Gros =

German-American Theologian

John Daniel Gros (or Gross) (1738 [older sources give 1737] in Webenheim, near Zweibrücken – 25 May 1812 in Canajoharie, New York) was a German-born clergyman of the Reformed Church who came to the United States.

== Biography ==
He was educated and the University of Marburg and the University of Heidelberg. He emigrated to the United States in 1764. During the American Revolution, he was exposed to many perils as pastor of churches on the frontier: in Pennsylvania, Kingston, New York and at Sand Hill. As a chaplain, he was present at the battles of Oriskany, Sharon and Johnstown. He moved to New York City once the revolution was over. There he was professor of German in Columbia University from 1784 to 1795, and professor of moral philosophy from 1787 to 1795. He was a regent of New York University in 1784, and a trustee of Columbia in 1787.

He became wealthy by buying soldiers' land warrants. The last ten years of his life were spent on a farm. The degree of S.T.D. was conferred on him by Columbia in 1789. He published Natural Principles of Rectitude (New York, 1795).
