= Mosby (imprint) =

US academic publisher of textbooks and academic journals

- Parent company: Elsevier
- Founded: 1906
- Country of origin: United States
- Headquarters location: Maryland Heights, Missouri
- Publication types: Books, academic journals
- Nonfiction topics: Health
- Official website: store.elsevier.com/Mosby/IMP_17/

Mosby is an academic publisher of textbooks and academic journals based in the United States.

The C.V. Mosby Company was incorporated in 1906 in St. Louis, Missouri.

Formerly independent, C.V. Mosby, Inc. was acquired by Times Mirror in 1967. In 1989, Times Mirror merged C.V. Mosby with Year Book Medical Publishers, Wolfe Publishing Ltd. and PSG Publishing Company.

Harcourt General acquired Mosby in 1998. The company was purchased by Reed Elsevier in 2001, and the company became an imprint of Elsevier.

== See also ==
- Category:Mosby academic journals
