= Board of Regents of the University of the State of New York =

Educational agency in New York State

The Board of Regents of the University of the State of New York is responsible for the general supervision of all educational activities within New York State, presiding over the University of the State of New York and the New York State Education Department.

== History ==
The board was established by statute on May 1, 1784. The members were divided into five classes: 1) ex officio members including the Governor of New York, the Lieutenant Governor of New York, the Secretary of State of New York, the New York Attorney General, and the Speaker of the New York State Assembly, the Mayor of New York City, the Mayor of Albany, New York, 2) two people from each of the then twelve existing counties, 3) one representative of each religious denomination in the state, chosen by their congregation, 4) founders of any college or school in the state (and their heirs or successors), and 5) representatives from selected colleges.

The regents were spread across the state and getting a necessary quorum proved difficult given the size of the state and travel demands. On November 26, 1784, 33 additional members were appointed, twenty of them from New York City and affiliated with King's College (now known as Columbia University). This arrangement also proved ineffective, so on April 13, 1787, the legislature legislated the existing regents out of office, and a new set of regents was appointed: the governor and the lieutenant governor continued as ex officio members, and 19 regents were appointed for life. This legislation also shifted the regents' focus from Columbia to schools, colleges, and universities across the state. On April 8, 1842, the secretary of state was added again as an ex officio member, and on March 30, 1854, the superintendent of public instruction. Vacancies were filled by joint ballot of the state legislature.

The regents were made a constitutional body, no longer defined by statute, in 1894. In 1904, the board was reorganized again and the ex officio members were legislated out. The offices of superintendent of public instruction and secretary of the board of regents were abolished and the duties of both transferred to the commissioner of education, who "serves at the pleasure" of the board of regents. The regents continued to be elected by joint ballot of the legislature. Eleven of the sitting 19 regents were chosen by the legislature to continue in office, and were classified to serve for different term lengths, so that every year one seat came up for election, for a full term. The number of board members was reduced to eight, one regent per New York State Judicial District (based on the 1876 Act establishing the districts.), plus three "at large" members.

1. New York (Manhattan) and Bronx (Bronx) Counties
2. Kings (Brooklyn), Nassau, Queens, Richmond (Staten Island), Suffolk (Long Island), Dutchess, Orange, Putnam, Rockland, Westchester (Yonkers) Counties (Hudson Valley)
3. Albany (Albany), Columbia, Greene, Rensselaer, Schoharie, Sullivan, Ulster Counties (Capital District)
4. Clinton, Essex, Franklin, Fulton, Hamilton, Montgomery, St. Lawrence, Saratoga, Schenectady, Warren, Washington Counties (North Country)
5. Herkimer, Jefferson, Lewis, Oneida, Onondaga (Syracuse), Oswego Counties (Central Region)
6. Broome (Binghamton), Chemung, Chenango, Cortland, Delaware, Madison, Otsego, Schuyler, Tioga, Tompkins Counties (Southern Tier)
7. Cayuga, Livingston, Monroe (Rochester), Ontario, Seneca, Steuben, Wayne, Yates Counties (Finger Lakes)
8. Allegany, Cattaraugus, Chautauqua, Erie (Buffalo), Genesee, Niagara, Orleans, Wyoming Counties (Western Region)

New regents members have been sworn in as districts were added and reconfigured.

- 1909: Francis M. Carpenter sworn in as the first regent from District 9 (Dutchess, Orange, Putnam, Rockland, and Westchester Counties)
- 1948: Cornelius W. Wickersham sworn in as the first regent from District 10 (Suffolk County)
- 1963: Joseph T. King sworn in as the first regent from District 11 (Queens)
- 1965: Max J. Rubin sworn in as the first 4th at-large member
- 1983: Jorge L. Batista sworn in as the first regent from District 12 (Bronx) and Norma Gluck was sworn in as the new District 1 regent
- 2009: Christine D. Cea sworn in as the first regent from District 13 (Staten Island)

Section 202 of the education laws of 1945 established that a regent could not serve past April 1 in the year following their 70th birthday or be a "trustee, president, principal, or any other officer of an institution belonged to the university." If either event occurred, the regent was expected to resign from the board. This restriction was lifted in 1986 with the passage of a New York State law banning mandatory retirement ages in most sectors.

Currently, 17 members serve, representing each of the 13 judicial districts plus 4 at-large members. Regents currently serve for a term of five years. The Regents have never received a salary and only their travel expenses are reimbursed.

== Responsibilities ==
The Board of Regents is responsible for overseeing education in the state of New York.

List of Members of the Board of Regents of the University of the State of New York
