= Albert Vander Veer =

American surgeon and educator (1841–1929)

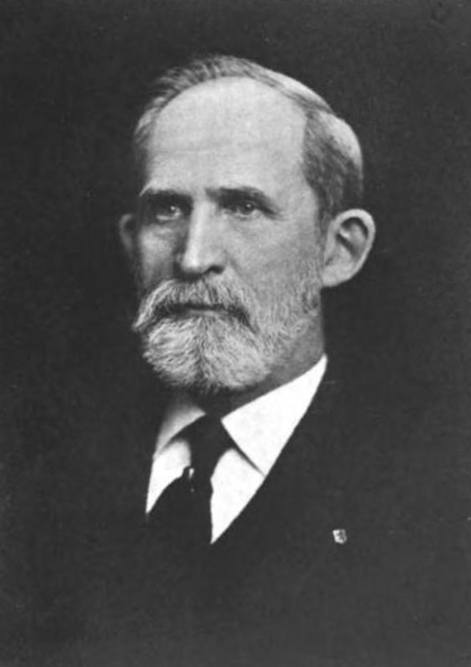
- Born: July 10, 1841; Root, New York, U.S.
- Died: December 19, 1929 (aged 88); Albany, New York, U.S.
- Education: Albany Medical College
- Alma mater: National Medical College (MD)
- Occupations: Surgeon; educator

Albert Vander Veer (July 10, 1841 – December 19, 1929) was a pioneering American surgeon, credited with performing the first thyroidectomy.

== Early life ==
Albert Vander Veer was born on July 10, 1841, in Root, New York, the son of Abraham Harris Vander Veer and Sarah Martin. After attending Union Free School, schools in Palatine and Canajoharie, and the Canajoharie Academy, he began to study medicine under the direction of Dr. Simeon Snow, of Currytown, New York, and later under Dr. John Swinburne, a physician and surgeon of renown in Albany.

In 1861 he attended a full course of lectures at Albany Medical College, and in 1862 a second course at the National Medical College, medical department, Columbian University, now the George Washington University, from which he was graduated in December 1862 with a M.D.

== Career ==
In May 1862, Vander Veer enlisted in the United States Medical Corps, one of the original One Hundred Medical Cadets called to service by the Surgeon General of the United States army, they having studied medicine two years and attended one full course of lectures and passing a satisfactory examination, to act as interns in the military hospitals. After taking the examination he was assigned to Columbia College Hospital, and was soon informed by Dr. Crosby, surgeon-in-charge, that if they (he and two or three other cadets) would arise early and attend to all their dressings they could have from 2 to 8 in which to attend lectures, graduate, and get their diplomas.

After passing a New York state examination he was commissioned in December 1862, assistant surgeon of the 66th New York Infantry Regiment, and ordered to join his regiment at Falmouth, Virginia. Soon after he was detailed as assistant to one of the chief operators at brigade hospital, Third Brigade, First Division, Second Army Corps, Army of the Potomac. In June 1864, on the recommendation of every officer in the regiment, he was appointed by Surgeon-General Quackenbush and New York Governor Horatio Seymour, surgeon in charge of the regiment, with the rank of major. Soon after he was appointed one of the surgeons of the First Division Hospital, Second Army Corps, and placed in charge of an operating table. Here he gained his first actual experience in operative surgery that was henceforth to be his specialty. He was with his regiment in all their battles after the first Fredericksburg except Ream's Station, when ill, up to the surrender at Appomattox. At that historic event he had the pleasure of witnessing the meeting between General Ulysses S. Grant and General Robert E. Lee. He was mustered out of the service in September 1865.

After attending a full course of lectures at the College of Physicians and Surgeons of New York, he returned to Albany in May 1866 and entered upon the practice of his profession.

In 1893, Veer was part of the executive committee for the first Pan-American Medical Congress. He served as member and president of the Albany County Medical Society, the Medical Society of the State of New York the American Association of Obstetricians and Gynecologists, and the American Medical Association (AMA), becoming president of the AMA in 1915. He was a delegate to the International Medical Congress, held at Copenhagen in 1884, and was elected honorary president of the Fifteenth International Medical Congress held at Lisbon in 1906, having been appointed one of the commissioners from the United States government.

In July 1905, he was elected president of the American Surgical Association, having been a fellow since 1882, a member of the nominating committee, of the council, and twice president. In 1909 he was appointed by the United States government delegate to the International Medical Congress meeting at Budapest, but was unable to attend owing to the illness of his wife.

He is the author of:

- "Cleft Palate and Hair Lip" in Wood's Reference Hand Book of Medical Science
- "History of General Surgery" in Encyclopedia Americana
- "Injuries and Diseases of Abdomen" in International Encyclopedia of Surgery

as well as numerous articles in the leading medical journals at home and abroad.

In 1867 he was attending surgeon to the Albany Hospital Dispensary as assistant to Dr. Alden March; 1869, attending surgeon (with exception 1874-75, while abroad studying) until 1904, when appointed surgeon-in-chief; 1873 to 1903, attending surgeon St. Peter's Hospital; 1898 onward, attending surgeon South End Dispensary; consulting surgeon New York State Hospital for Crippled and Ruptured Children, West Haverstraw, New York; consulting surgeon Benedictine Hospital, Kingston, New York; consulting surgeon Champlain Valley Hospital, Plattsburgh, New York.

Vander Veer filled the following important chairs at Albany Medical College: 1869-1874, chair of general and special anatomy; 1875–1882, chair of didactic, abdominal and clinical surgery; 1882 onward, chair of surgery; dean from 1896 to 1904. Vander Veer applied in Albany the first plaster of paris jacket for curvature of the spine; performed the first Bigelow's operation for litholapaxy; first Kernochan's operation for removal of infra orbital nerve and Meckel's ganglia, reporting a number of cases.

In 1895 he was elected a regent of the University of the State of New York, serving for six years; then by act of legislature the board was changed, he drawing the shortest period of one year; re-elected in 1902 a third time for a full term, the first regent to be elected three times by the legislature. At the expiration of this term he was elected for a full term of twelve years, being the only instance of any regent being elected a fourth time. In 1915 he was elected vice-chancellor of the board. On May 27, 1921, he was elected chancellor, but by reason of impaired hearing, resigned on September 22, 1921.

He was a trustee of the National Savings Bank many years; resigning January 1, 1910; trustee of Albany Cemetery Association, and president of the Holland Society of New York. While vice-president of the latter society he, with other members of Albany, entertained the officers of the "Van Speyk" when visiting this country, received from Queen Wilhelmina of the Netherlands the order and decoration of Oranje Nassau. He was a life member of the New York Historical Society. Through his own military service as an officer in the Civil War he became a companion of the Military Order of the Loyal Legion and Grand Army of the Republic.

He was a member of Philip Livingston Chapter, Sons of the American Revolution, the Albany Institute and Historical and Art Society, and of Albany social clubs — Fort Orange and University. In his nearly fifty years of professional life, Vander Veer received the following awards:

- Albany Medical College conferred an honorary degree of M.D.
- Williams and Hamilton College conferred an A.M. (1882)
- Union College (now University) Ph.D. (1883)
- Columbian University (now George Washington University, Washington, D.C.) in 1904 conferred LL.D.

== Personal life and family ==
On June 5, 1867, Vander Veer married Margaret E. Snow, daughter of Dr. Simeon Snow, of Currytown. They had six children, three of whom survived into adulthood and became doctors. His brother-in-law, Norman Snow, was also a doctor.

Abraham Harris Vander Veer (1804–1888)	Sarah Martin	Simeon Snow (1803–1865)
Norman Leslie Snow (1838–1885)
Albert Vander Veer (1841–1929)
Charles Anson (1868–1883)	Margaret Snow (1869–1873)	Edgar Albert	James Newell

Margaret Dievendorf (1811–1884)
Margaret E Snow (1845–1914)
Albert, Jr.	Garrett (1885–1900)

Vander Veer died at his home in Albany on December 19, 1929.
