= Herbert Lawrence Bridgman =

American journalist (1844–1924)

Bridgman in 1910

Herbert Lawrence Bridgman (May 30, 1844 in Amherst, Massachusetts– September 24, 1924) was an American explorer and journalist described as the "Ulysses of journalists" for his work organizing the Robert Peary expedition to the North Pole.

Peary sent Bridgman the code cable "Sun" (meaning "We have reached the world's end"). In 1894, Bridgman led the relief expedition after Peary when he was lost in the Arctic.

Bridgman died at sea on board the USS Newport. He bequeathed his estate to the University of the State of New York at the expiration of the life of his widow, Helen Bartlett Bridgman. The Regent Bridgman Scholarship is named in his honor.

Bridgman had been a member of the Peary Arctic Club; Cape Bridgman in Greenland was named after him by Robert Peary.
