= 107th New York State Legislature =

New York state legislative session

←	106th	108th	→
- New York State Capitol (2009)

Overview
- Legislative body: New York State Legislature
- Jurisdiction: New York, United States
- Term: January 1 – December 31, 1884

Senate
- Members: 32
- President: Lt. Gov. David B. Hill (D)
- Temporary President: Dennis McCarthy (R)
- Party control: Republican (19-13)

Assembly
- Members: 128
- Speaker: Titus Sheard (R)
- Party control: Republican (72-56)

Sessions
- 1st: January 1 – May 16, 1884

The 107th New York State Legislature, consisting of the New York State Senate and the New York State Assembly, met from January 1 to May 16, 1884, during the second year of Grover Cleveland's governorship, in Albany.

== Background ==
Under the provisions of the New York Constitution of 1846, 32 Senators and 128 assemblymen were elected in single-seat districts; senators for a two-year term, assemblymen for a one-year term. The senatorial districts were made up of entire counties, except New York County (seven districts) and Kings County (three districts). The Assembly districts were made up of entire towns, or city wards, forming a contiguous area, all within the same county.

At this time there were two major political parties: the Democratic Party and the Republican Party. In New York City the Democrats were split into three factions: Tammany Hall, "Irving Hall" and the "County Democrats". The Prohibition Party and the Greenback Party also nominated tickets.

== Elections ==
The 1883 New York state election was held on November 6. Of the five statewide elective offices up for election, four were carried by the Democrats, and one by a Republican. The approximate party strength at this election was: Democratic 446,000; Republican 430,000; Prohibition 18,000; and Greenback 7,000.

== Sessions ==
The Legislature met for the regular session at the State Capitol in Albany on January 1, 1884; and adjourned on May 16.

Titus Sheard (R) was elected Speaker against Frank Rice (D).

Dennis McCarthy (R) was elected president pro tempore of the State Senate.

== State Senate ==
=== Districts ===
- 1st District: Queens and Suffolk counties
- 2nd District: 1st, 2nd, 5th, 6th, 8th, 9th, 10th, 12th and 22nd Ward of the City of Brooklyn, and the towns of Flatbush, Gravesend and New Utrecht in Kings County
- 3rd District: 3rd, 4th, 7th, 11th, 13th, 19th, 20th, 21st and 23rd Ward of the City of Brooklyn
- 4th District: 14th, 15th, 16th, 17th, 18th, 24th and 25th Ward of the City of Brooklyn, and the towns of New Lots and Flatlands in Kings County
- 5th District: Richmond County and the 1st, 2nd, 3rd, 5th, 6th, 8th, 14th and parts of the 4th and 9th Ward of New York City
- 6th District: 7th, 11th, 13th and part of the 4th Ward of NYC
- 7th District: 10th, 17th and part of the 15th, 18th and 21st Ward of NYC
- 8th District: 16th and part of the 9th, 15th, 18th, 20th and 21st Ward of NYC
- 9th District: Part of the 18th, 19th and 21st Ward of NYC
- 10th District: Part of the 12th, 19th, 20th, 21st and 22nd Ward of NYC
- 11th District: 23rd and 24th, and part of the 12th, 20th and 22nd Ward of NYC
- 12th District: Rockland and Westchester counties
- 13th District: Orange and Sullivan counties
- 14th District: Greene, Schoharie and Ulster counties
- 15th District: Columbia, Dutchess and Putnam counties
- 16th District: Rensselaer and Washington counties
- 17th District: Albany County
- 18th District: Fulton, Hamilton, Montgomery, Saratoga and Schenectady counties
- 19th District: Clinton, Essex and Warren counties
- 20th District: Franklin, Lewis and St. Lawrence counties
- 21st District: Oswego and Jefferson counties
- 22nd District: Oneida County
- 23rd District: Herkimer, Madison and Otsego counties
- 24th District: Chenango, Delaware and Broome counties
- 25th District: Onondaga and Cortland counties
- 26th District: Cayuga, Seneca, Tompkins and Tioga counties
- 27th District: Allegany, Chemung and Steuben counties
- 28th District: Ontario, Schuyler, Wayne and Yates counties
- 29th District: Monroe and Orleans counties
- 30th District: Genesee, Livingston, Niagara and Wyoming counties
- 31st District: Erie County
- 32nd District: Cattaraugus and Chautauqua counties

Note: There are now 62 counties in the State of New York. The counties which are not mentioned in this list had not yet been established, or sufficiently organized, the area being included in one or more of the abovementioned counties.

=== Members ===
The asterisk (*) denotes members of the previous Legislature who continued in office as members of this Legislature. Michael C. Murphy and Timothy J. Campbell changed from the Assembly to the Senate.

District	Senator	Party	Notes
1st	James Otis	Republican	
2nd	John J. Kiernan*	Democrat	re-elected
3rd	Albert Daggett	Republican	
4th	John C. Jacobs*	Democrat	re-elected
5th	Michael C. Murphy*	County/Irv. H. Dem.	
6th	Timothy J. Campbell*	County/Irv. H. Dem.	
7th	James Daly*	County Dem.	re-elected
8th	Frederick S. Gibbs	Republican	
9th	John J. Cullen	Tammany Dem.	
10th	J. Hampden Robb	Democrat	
11th	George W. Plunkitt	Tammany Dem.	
12th	Henry C. Nelson*	Democrat	re-elected
13th	Henry R. Low	Republican	
14th	John Van Schaick	Democrat	
15th	Thomas Newbold	Democrat	
16th	Albert C. Comstock	Republican	
17th	John B. Thacher	Democrat	
18th	James Arkell	Republican	
19th	Shepard P. Bowen*	Republican	re-elected
20th	John I. Gilbert	Republican	
21st	Frederick Lansing*	Republican	re-elected
22nd	Henry J. Coggeshall	Republican	
23rd	Andrew Davidson	Republican	
24th	Edward B. Thomas*	Republican	re-elected
25th	Dennis McCarthy*	Republican	re-elected; elected president pro tempore
26th	Edward S. Esty	Republican	
27th	J. Sloat Fassett	Republican	
28th	Thomas Robinson	Republican	
29th	Charles S. Baker	Republican	on November 4, 1884, elected to the 49th U.S. Congress
30th	Timothy E. Ellsworth*	Republican	re-elected
31st	Robert C. Titus*	Democrat	re-elected
32nd	Commodore P. Vedder	Republican	

=== Employees ===
- Clerk: John W. Vrooman
- Sergeant-at-Arms: George A. Goss
- Doorkeeper: David W. Bogert
- Stenographer: Hudson C. Tanner
- Postmaster: A. E. Darrow
- Janitor: A. L. Neidick
- Chaplain: S. V. Leech

== State Assembly ==
=== Assemblymen ===
The asterisk (*) denotes members of the previous Legislature who continued as members of this Legislature.

District		Assemblymen	Party	Notes
Albany	1st	John Zimmerman	Rep./Citizens	
Albany	2nd	Hiram Becker	Republican	
Albany	3rd	Edward A. Maher*	Democrat	
Albany	4th	James Forsyth Jr.	Republican	
Allegany		Charles S. Hall*	Republican	
Broome		William H. Olin	Republican	
Cattaraugus	1st	Frederick W. Kruse	Republican	
Cattaraugus	2nd	Eugene A. Nash	Republican	
Cayuga	1st	Willoughby B. Priddy	Republican	
Cayuga	2nd	William Howland*	Republican	
Chautauqua	1st	Dana P. Horton	Republican	
Chautauqua	2nd	Oscar F. Price*	Republican	
Chemung		Jonas S. Van Duzer	Republican	
Chenango		Charles W. Brown	Democrat	
Clinton		William E. Smith	Democrat	
Columbia		Gilbert A. Deane	Republican	
Cortland		A. Judson Kneeland	Republican	
Delaware		Silas S. Cartwright	Republican	
Dutchess	1st	James Kent Jr.	Republican	
Dutchess	2nd	Edward B. Osborne	Democrat	
Erie	1st	Cornelius Donohue*	Democrat	
Erie	2nd	Frank Sipp	Republican	
Erie	3rd	George Clinton	Republican	
Erie	4th	Timothy W. Jackson*	Democrat	
Erie	5th	David J. Wilcox*	Democrat	
Essex		Nathaniel C. Boynton*	Republican	
Franklin		William T. O'Neil*	Republican	
Fulton and Hamilton		Linn L. Boyce	Republican	
Genesee		Lucien R. Bailey	Republican	
Greene		Bradley S. McCabe	Democrat	
Herkimer		Titus Sheard	Republican	elected Speaker
Jefferson	1st	Isaac L. Hunt Jr.*	Republican	
Jefferson	2nd	Eli J. Seeber	Republican	
Kings	1st	Michael E. Butler*	Democrat	
Kings	2nd	Richard Nagle	Democrat	
Kings	3rd	Peter J. Kelly	Democrat	
Kings	4th	Patrick Burns*	Democrat	
Kings	5th	Michael J. Coffey	Democrat	
Kings	6th	Thomas F. Farrell	Democrat	
Kings	7th	George H. Lindsay*	Democrat	
Kings	8th	George H. Nason	Republican	
Kings	9th	Alfred Hodges*	Republican	
Kings	10th	James Taylor*	Republican	
Kings	11th	Henry Heath	Republican	
Kings	12th	Mortimer C. Earl*	Democrat	
Lewis		Charles M. Allen	Democrat	
Livingston		Kidder M. Scott*	Republican	
Madison		Edward F. Haskell	Republican	
Monroe	1st	Walter S. Hubbell	Republican	
Monroe	2nd	Charles R. Pratt	Republican	
Monroe	3rd	Philip Garbutt	Republican	
Montgomery		Martin Walrath Jr.	Democrat	
New York	1st	Patrick H. Duffy	County/Irv. H. Dem.	
New York	2nd	James Oliver	County/Irv. H. Dem.	
New York	3rd	John C. Brogan	Tam./Irv. H. Dem.	
New York	4th	Patrick H. Roche*	Irving H. Dem.	
New York	5th	Dominick F. Mullaney*	Tammany Dem.	
New York	6th	Peter Henry Jobes	County/Irv. H. Dem.	
New York	7th	Lucas L. Van Allen*	Republican	
New York	8th	Charles Smith	Republican	
New York	9th	Frederick B. House*	Republican	
New York	10th	Charles A. Binder	Republican	
New York	11th	Walter Howe*	Republican	
New York	12th	Solomon D. Rosenthal	County/Irv. H. Dem.	
New York	13th	Isaac Dayton	Republican	
New York	14th	John E. Donnelly	Tammany Dem.	
New York	15th	James F. Higgins*	County Dem.	
New York	16th	Peter F. Murray	County/Irv. H. Dem.	
New York	17th	Richard J. Lewis	Republican	
New York	18th	Thomas Murphy	Irving H. Dem.	
New York	19th	Dow S. Kittle	Republican	
New York	20th	James Haggerty*	Tammany Dem.	
New York	21st	Theodore Roosevelt*	Republican	Chairman of Affairs of Cities
New York	22nd	John T. McDonald	Tammany Dem.	
New York	23rd	Daniel M. Van Cott	Democrat	
New York	24th	John J. Clarke*	Tam./Irv. H. Dem.	
Niagara	1st	Jacob A. Driess	Democrat	
Niagara	2nd	Thomas Vincent Welch*	Democrat	
Oneida	1st	Joseph Joyce	Labor Reform/Rep.	
Oneida	2nd	Joseph Ackroyd	Democrat	
Oneida	3rd	T. James Owens	Republican	
Onondaga	1st	James Geddes*	Republican	
Onondaga	2nd	Francis Hendricks	Republican	
Onondaga	3rd	Conrad Shoemaker	Republican	
Ontario		Frank Rice*	Democrat	Minority Leader
Orange	1st	J. Chauncey Odell*	Democrat	
Orange	2nd	Jacob H. Dimmick*	Democrat	
Orleans		J. Marshall Dibble	Republican	
Oswego	1st	DeWitt C. Littlejohn	Republican	
Oswego	2nd	Gouverneur M. Sweet	Republican	
Otsego	1st	William Caryl Ely*	Democrat	
Otsego	2nd	Hartford D. Nelson*	Democrat	
Putnam		Henry D. Clapp	Republican	
Queens	1st	Louis K. Church*	Democrat	
Queens	2nd	Edward A. Darragh	Democrat	
Rensselaer	1st	James P. Hooley	Dem./Labor Reform	
Rensselaer	2nd	Sylvanus D. Locke	Republican	
Rensselaer	3rd	William T. Miles	Democrat	
Richmond		Edward A. Moore	Democrat	
Rockland		John W. Felter	Democrat	
St. Lawrence	1st	N. Martin Curtis	Republican	
St. Lawrence	2nd	Morell D. Beckwith*	Republican	
St. Lawrence	3rd	George Z. Erwin*	Republican	
Saratoga	1st	Daniel C. Briggs	Republican	
Saratoga	2nd	Thomas Noxon	Republican	
Schenectady		John W. Vedder	Republican	
Schoharie		James H. Brown	Democrat	
Schuyler		J. Franklin Barnes	Democrat	
Seneca		George W. Jones	Republican	
Steuben	1st	George E. Whiteman	Democrat	
Steuben	2nd	Andrew B. Craig*	Democrat	
Suffolk		Simeon S. Hawkins	Republican	
Sullivan		George B. Childs*	Democrat	
Tioga		Charles F. Barager	Republican	
Tompkins		John E. Cady*	Democrat	
Ulster	1st	Thomas H. Tremper*	Republican	
Ulster	2nd	Gilbert D. B. Hasbrouck	Republican	
Ulster	3rd	George R. Johnson	Democrat	
Warren		Lorenzo R. Locke*	Republican	
Washington	1st	Daniel M. Westfall	Republican	
Washington	2nd	Charles K. Baker	Republican	
Wayne	1st	Ammon S. Farnum	Republican	
Wayne	2nd	Silas S. Pierson	Republican	
Westchester	1st	Norton P. Otis	Republican	
Westchester	2nd	Samuel W. Johnson*	Democrat	
Westchester	3rd	James W. Husted	Republican	
Wyoming		George M. Palmer	Republican	
Yates		Henry C. Harpending	Democrat	

=== Employees ===
- Clerk: Charles A. Chickering
- Sergeant-at-Arms: Henry Wheeler
- Doorkeeper: Michael Maher
- First Assistant Doorkeeper: James Robinson
- Second Assistant Doorkeeper: John P. Earl
- Stenographer: Emory P. Close

== Sources ==
- Civil List and Constitutional History of the Colony and State of New York compiled by Edgar Albert Werner (1884; see pg. 276 for Senate districts; pg. 291 for senators; pg. 298–304 for Assembly districts; and pg. 382 for assemblymen)
- Biographical sketches of the members of the Legislature in The Evening Journal Almanac (1884)
- MR. SHEARD TO BE SPEAKER in NYT on January 1, 1884
- THE LEGISLATURE OF 1884 in NYT on January 2, 1884
