= Thomas Vincent Welch =

American politician (1850–1903)

Member of the New York State Assembly
- In office January 1, 1882 – December 31, 1884
- Preceded by: James Low
- Succeeded by: Walter P. Horne

Superintendent of the State Reservation at Niagara
- In office 1885–1903

Supervisor of the Town of Niagara
- In office 1877–1878

Personal details
- Born: October 1, 1850 Camillus, New York
- Died: October 20, 1903 (aged 53) Niagara Falls, New York
- Party: Democrat (1882–1903)
- Spouse: Anna Gill
- Occupation: Statesman, conservationist, civil servant

Thomas Vincent Welch (October 1, 1850 – October 20, 1903) was a New York State Assemblyman and served as the first Superintendent of the New York State Reservation at Niagara, holding the post for 18 years. As a member of the New York State Assembly, Welch was a key player in the efforts to acquire the lands adjoining Niagara Falls, and to make them free for all to view.

Niagara Falls, New York was not always as we know it today. In the mid-19th century, heavy industries and mills crowded the shoreline near the falls, in order to take advantage of free power. These mills charged fees for visitors to view the falls, which were largely obstructed. A group of concerned citizens, politicians, and architects - including T.V.Welch - started the "Free Niagara" movement. When the bill making Niagara Falls free was signed on April 30, 1885, it was the culmination of a campaign in the New York State Legislature spearheaded by Thomas V. Welch. His efforts, and those of everyone involved, are documented in a pamphlet entitled How Niagara Was Made Free, which was published by the Niagara Frontier Historical Society, and in the annals of New York State.

== Early life ==
Plaque dedicated to T.V. Welch at Niagara Falls

Thomas Vincent Welch was born in Camillus, New York (near Syracuse), the third of six children of Thomas and Honora (Holland) Welch, both Irish immigrants (from Kilmeena and Aghagower, respectively, both in County Mayo). His parents originally immigrated to Canada and were married in Cornville, Ontario on Aug.31, 1842 and later moved to Onondaga County. Sometime after his birth in 1850, his parents moved to the Niagara Falls area along with his two brothers - Edward and John. A sister born in 1848, Honora, died when she was eight months old. Once in the Niagara Falls area, however, his parents had two more children, Ellen in 1852 and Anne in 1856.

He was educated in the public schools in Niagara Falls and at an early age was employed at the New York Central Railroad Company as timekeeper in the shops in the village of Niagara Falls. In 1873 he was promoted to be freight agent of the Central Railroad there, a position he occupied for three years. In 1876 he left the railroad and went into the mercantile business.

== Welch & Ryan - mercantile business ==
On April 12, 1876 – the same day that Welch was elected Supervisor of the Town of Niagara – he and his partner Michael Ryan announced the opening of a new dry goods store on Falls St., the first door east of the Spencer House. The firm of Welch & Ryan sold cloth (including fine cloth such as cashmere and silks), clothing, coats, carpets, underwear and hosiery, and furs among other items. Throughout the 1880s, Welch & Ryan would periodically report on new seasonal items being stocked for the season such as spring carpets or Jersey Coats, even reporting when they had returned from shopping expeditions in New York City.

From 1883 to 1885 we know that Welch was very busy with the Niagara Park Bill, the stumping for votes for the Bill and of course his work in Albany, but Welch kept his ownership in the Welch & Ryan business. On Sept. 15, 1888 however an announcement ran stating the business would become H.E. Slocum & Co., with the retirement of Michael Ryan. The business would close and reopen on Oct. 6, 1888 under the new name. In 1874 Welch's new partner, Humphrey Elias Slocum, had married Frances Marion Binkley of Niagara Falls and moved on April 12, 1875 to Geneva, Ontario County, NY. as a partner in his brothers' dry goods business under the name John N. Slocum & Brother and hence had experience in the dry goods business. T.V. Welch remained a partner in the H.E. Slocum & Co. business.

== Political career ==
In public affairs, from 1873 to 1874 he was clerk of the village of Niagara Falls, and in 1875–6 he was a village trustee. In 1876, 1877 and 1878 he was elected Supervisor of the town of Niagara and in the latter year he was chosen as chairman of the Board of Supervisors of the county of Niagara.

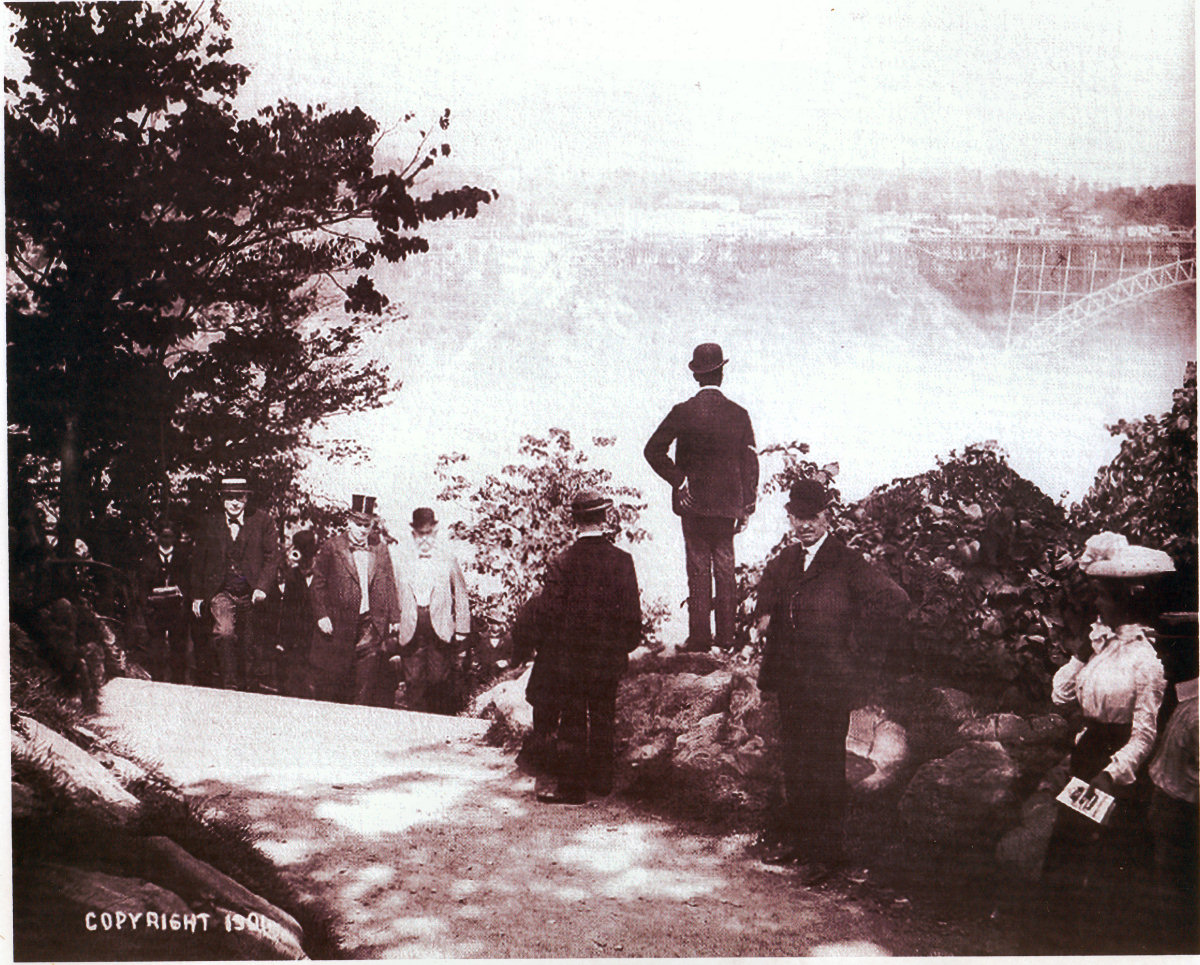
Thomas Vincent Welch and President William McKinley at Niagara Falls on Sept.6, 1901. Roughly 4 hours later McKinley was assassinated.

In the town election on April 11, 1876, Welch ran for Supervisor of the Town of Niagara against O.W. Cutler, the incumbent. In an election during which "…nearly all of the voters of the town came out…", the result saw Welch win the election with 294 of 1,110 votes, against the incumbent who received 213 votes. The election of Welch prompted the editors of the Niagara Falls Gazette to write:

In the election of Thos. V. Welch, the town has secured a Supervisor who, we venture to say, will make an honorable record, who will be prompt and exact in handling the public funds, and who will be fair and impartial in the Board of Supervisors. He is a strictly temperate young man, belongs to no rabble, and has an excellent reputation to be maintained.

Welch went on to meet these expectations, and was re-elected in 1877 and 1878. In 1878 Welch was further chosen as chairman of the Board of Supervisors for the County of Niagara.

After four years as Supervisor in Niagara, Welch made the decision to run for New York State Assembly in the New York state election, 1880 held on Nov. 2, 1880, he was not however the successful candidate

On October 22, 1881 in Olcott, NY, William Samways, Konrad Fink and Wm. Vaney from Niagara were delegates to the Democratic Convention for the Second Assembly District of Niagara County and nominated Thomas V. Welch as its candidate for Assembly by acclamation. The Suspension Bridge Journal noted that:

(Welch) deserves it. He is recognized all over the district as an able, capable and deserving man, who has filled all positions of trust to which he has been called with credit to himself and with usefulness to the public. Above all he has been with, of, and for the people of this town in the struggle to prevent the usurpation of their rights in this police matter. As one of the trustees of the village of Niagara Falls he stood up manfully against the demands of the pseudo police commissioners and by the firmness of himself and his associates the rights of the people were vindicated in Judge Barker's court, and his election to the Legislature would be such a popular rebuke to the concoctors of this mischievous legislation as they deserve.

The New York state election, 1881 held on November 8, saw "…the greatest victory ever won by the Democrats of Niagara." with every Democratic candidate elected by "decisive majorities". Thomas V. Welch was elected in a majority to Member of the New York State Assembly from Niagara, second district and would go on to serve in the 105th, 106th and 107th New York State Legislatures.

1882 would be a very busy year for Welch as he left for Albany on New Year's Day, 1882 the year would see him working on an insurance corruption committee, as well as bills varying from water commissioners and the railway act to the repeal of a police act and voting for women's suffrage.

Just two weeks into his term, he was made a member of the Democratic Caucus Committee and on January 24, 1882 spoke for the first time in the New York State Assembly, working to bring the Assembly to order. The Saratoga Journal reported he "spoke with force, made a favorable impression and commanded the attention of the house." Welch moved for instant rejection of a proposition from Tammany Hall members and throughout 1882 would push back against the Tammany members in Assembly.

On March 2, 1882 Welch introduced his first bill, a brief bill that would create an independent board of Water Commissioners, elected at a separate election in June of each year, as well as a clause that prohibited the increase of bonded indebtedness of the village of Suspension Bridge, Niagara County. This bill passed and by June 3, 1882 the papers were notifying electors of an election for the Water Commissioners on June 6. Welch proved himself to be a strong believer in democracy with his speech on April 13, 1882 concerning the Railroad Commission Bill. The bill was intended to enable the appointment of three commissioners for the railway commission, however the Republican and Tammany assemblymen were pushing for the power of appointment to be given to Governor Alonzo B. Cornell, whereas the Democrats were looking for the commission to be elected by the people. Welch's speech was printed in its entirety in the Saturday Suspension Bridge Journal, which showed his strong belief in the electoral system and the power of the people:

I believe that the people can choose three men who will discharge their duties faithfully according to the provisions of the bill. If as the gentleman from Onondaga (Thomas G. Alvord) says they cannot be trusted to do this, then our experiment of a government by the people is a failure and we should return quickly to a monachial system, where the ruler appoints every officer from the prime minister down to a justice of the peace, and be governed again as Russia and Ireland are governed to-day...

On Wednesday, April 19, 1882, Welch's Railroad Commission bill amendment passed in the Assembly, thanks in part to several Republican members voting with the amendment. Welch saw his bill repealing the police law pass on May 3, 1882, he sponsored a bill to change the boundaries of the Village of Niagara Falls, and on May 20, 1882 voted in favour of a women's suffrage bill Welch was also part of an Assembly Committee investigating the receiverships of insolvent insurance companies in the State, along with Alfred C. Chapin, James Haggerty (Chairman of Grievances), Benjamin F. Baker and George Z. Erwin.

Following Grover Cleveland's election, Thomas V. was regarded as the most likely appointee for U.S. Collector of Customs at the then Port of Suspension Bridge, for many years the most powerful and most remunerative position in that part of the country.

== Superintendent of the State Reservation at Niagara ==
Grover Cleveland came to office in 1885, at the peak of the Free Niagara movement, and the unanimous choice (of the Niagara Reservation Commission) of Welch becoming the Superintendent of the parks resulted in him accepting that post.

On Sept.6, 1901, T.V.Welch, in his role as Superintendent of the Niagara Reservation, welcomed President William McKinley to the Park, and toured through the Park with him on foot. Four hours later, President McKinley was assassinated at the Pan-American Exhibition in Buffalo, NY.

In 1902 after 17 years of outstanding service, the Commission presented him with a sterling silver "loving cup" and parchment, in recognition of his service to the State.

Sterling silver cup given to T.V.Welch

Mr. Welch played an important part in the incorporation of the city of Niagara Falls. He was a member of the charter committee, and, with Hon. W. Caryl Ely, was in Albany when Governor Roswell P. Flower signed the Niagara Falls city charter bill, March 17, 1892, in fact Governor Flower was ready to sign the bill the day before, but Mr. Welch requested that he hold off until the next day, St. Patrick's Day. He procured the pen with which the governor signed the bill.

Mr. Welch also had a leading part in the organization of the Niagara Falls Power Company.

Mr. Welch was the first president of the Memorial Hospital Association and active in its affairs for many years. He was a member of a great many civic societies and organizations. He was prominently identified with a number of organizations of St. Mary's Church, and a trustee of Niagara University.

He was vice-president of the Niagara Frontier Historical Society at the time of his death, was also a member of the Niagara Frontier Land Marks Association, and had served two terms as president of the Civic Club, as president of the Niagara County Pioneer Association, of the Shakespeare Club, and was an honorary member of the Niagara County Farmers Club.

Thomas V. Welch was married to Anna Gill at Belfast, New York on October 21, 1902.

== Death and legacy ==
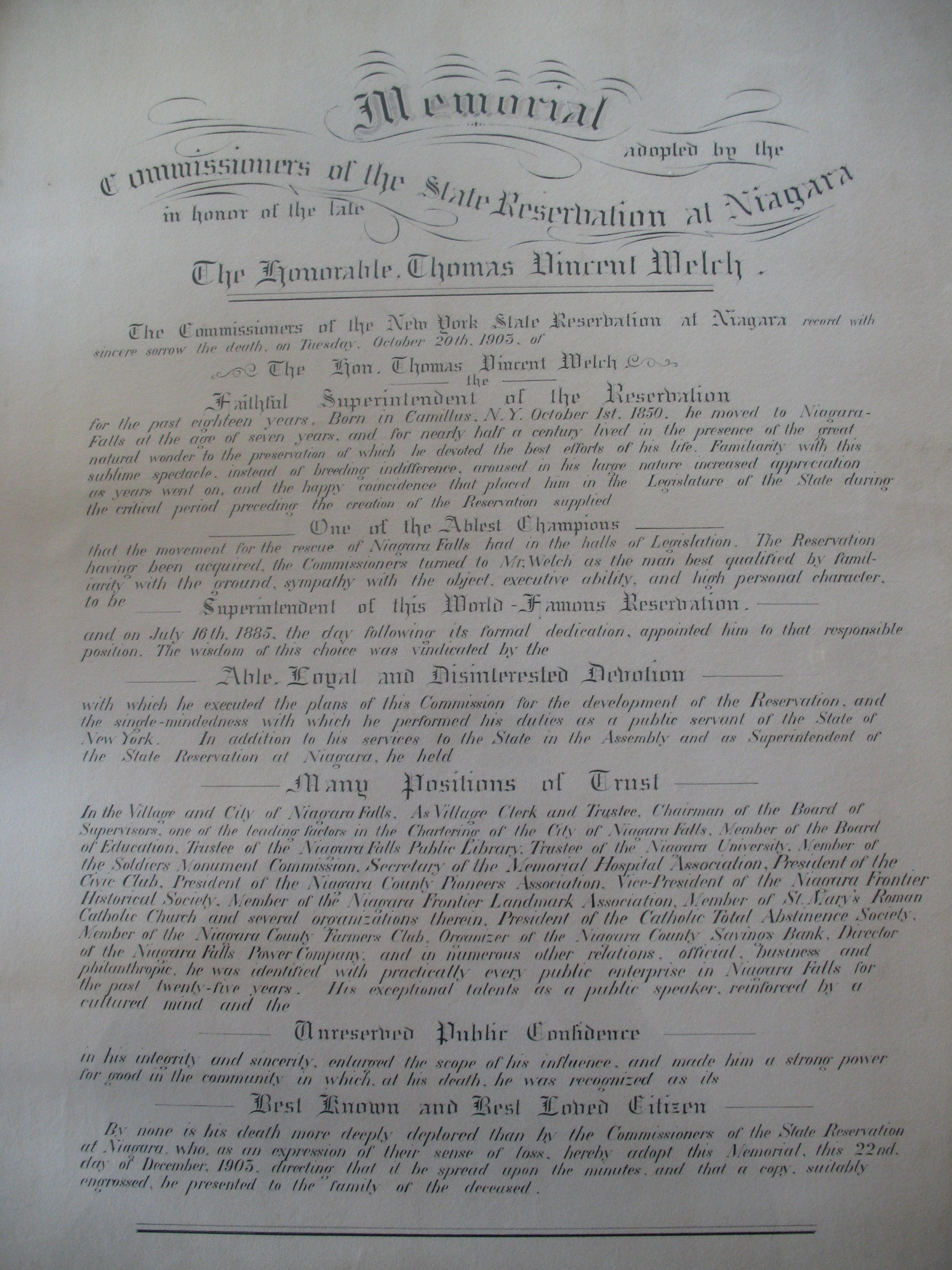
Memorial parchment given to the Welch family

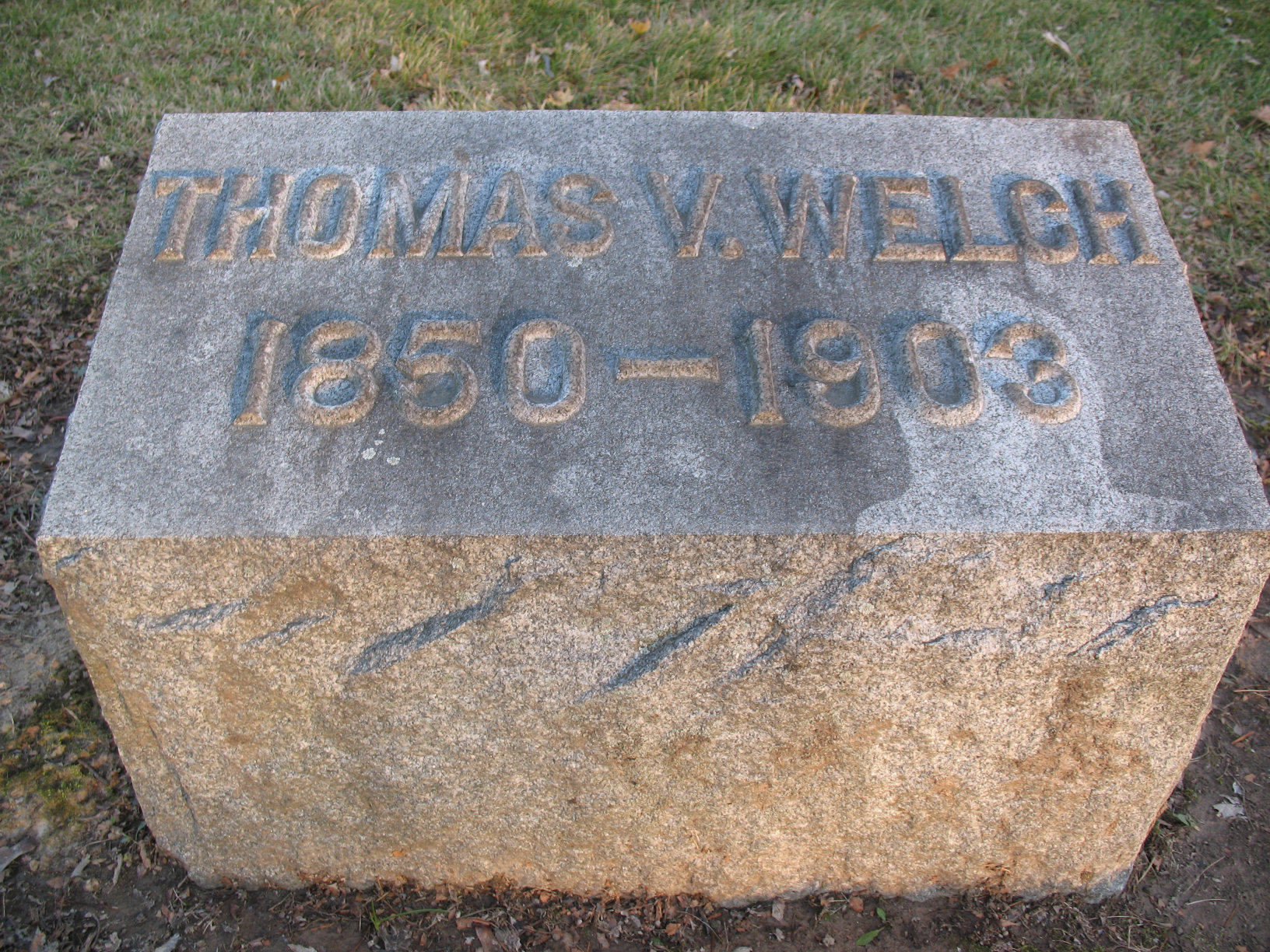
The grave of T.V.Welch at the Gate of Heaven Cemetery in Lewiston, NY

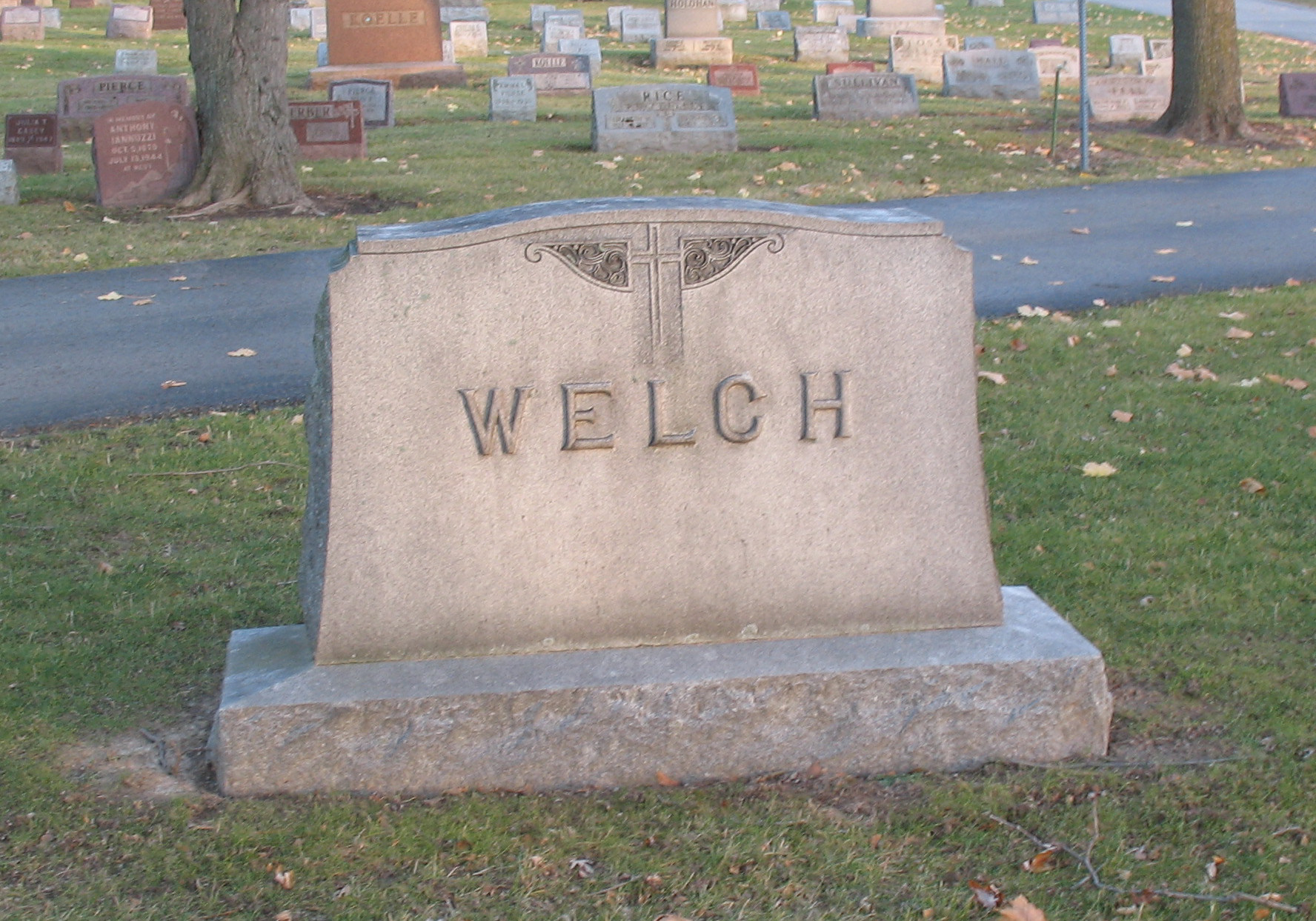
The Welch Family marker at the Gate of Heaven Cemetery in Lewiston, NY

Just one year after his marriage, T.V.Welch died from an attack of typhoid fever, aged 53. At the time of his death, Thomas Vincent Welch was recognized at the "best known and best loved citizen" of Niagara Falls, as stated by the Commissioners of the State Reservation at Niagara, who adopted a memorial in their minutes on December 22, 1903 and provided a copy of those minutes to the family of T.V. Welch, pictured to the right. The document reads, in part:

In addition to his services to the State in the Assembly and as Superintendent of the State Reservation at Niagara, he held many positions of trust in the Village and City of Niagara Falls...he was identified with practically every public enterprise in Niagara Falls for the past twenty-five years. His exceptional talents as a public speaker, reinforced by a cultured mind and the unreserved public confidence in his integrity and sincerity, enlarged the scope of his influence, and made him a strong power for good in the community which, at his death, he was recognized as its best known and best loved citizen. By none his death more deeply deplored than by the Commissioners of the State Reservation at Niagara, who, as an expression of their sense of loss, hereby adopt this Memorial, this 22nd day of December, 1903, directing that it be spread upon the minutes, and that a copy, suitably engrossed, be presented to the family of the deceased.

T.V.Welch was originally buried in the cemetery of St.Mary's of the Cataract in Niagara Falls. On May 11, 1936 his remains were moved, along with others, to the Gate of Heaven Cemetery in Lewiston, New York. His remains rest with those of his family at the South East corner of Section 3 of the cemetery.

On July 15, 2010, a 125th Anniversary celebration was held and the plaque dedicated to T.V.Welch (pictured at the top of this article) was placed on a new stone in the Heritage Park, a new section of the Niagara Falls State Park.

== Published works ==
- Full scanned text of How Niagara Was Made Free by T.V.Welch, Buffalo Historical Society Publications
- Speech of the Hon.Thomas V. Welch in the Assembly of New York, Friday, March 2, 1883. Full text scanned by Internet Archive.

New York State Assembly
Preceded by James Low	New York State Assembly; Niagara County, 2nd District; 1882–1884	Succeeded by Walter P. Horne
