= John E. Smith (New York politician) =

American politician

John E Smith
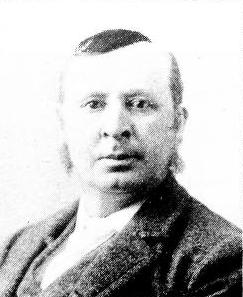
- Smith in 1893

Member of the New York Senate from the 23rd district
- In office 1892–1893
- In office 1886–1887

Personal details
- Born: August 4, 1843 Nelson, New York, U.S.
- Died: 1907 (aged 63–64)
- Education: Albany Law School
- Occupation: Politician, judge

John E. Smith (August 4, 1843 Nelson, Madison County, New York – 1907) was an American politician from New York.

== Life ==
Smith attended the district schools and Cazenovia Seminary, graduated from Albany Law School in 1867, was admitted to the bar the same year, and practiced in Morrisville.

Smith was district attorney of Madison County from 1878 to 1880, and in 1882; a member of the New York State Senate (23rd D.) in 1886 and 1887; and assistant United States Attorney for the Northern District of New York from July 1889 to July 1891.

On October 9, 1891, Smith was nominated on the 937th ballot by the Republican 23rd senatorial district convention, defeating the incumbent Titus Sheard, and was again a member of the State Senate in 1892 and 1893.

In March 1899, Smith was appointed as judge of Madison County, to fill a vacancy.

Smith is buried in the Morrisville Rural Cemetery.

== Sources ==
- The New York Red Book compiled by Edgar L. Murlin (published by James B. Lyon, Albany NY, 1897; pg. 403f)
- New York State Legislative Souvenir for 1893 with Portraits of the Members of Both Houses by Henry P. Phelps (pg. 19)
- PLATT CARRIES HIS POINT in NYT on October 10, 1891
- Bio transcribed from Our County and Its People: a Descriptive and Biographical Record of Madison County, New York by (1899)

New York State Senate
Preceded by Andrew Davidson	New York State Senate; 23rd District; 1886–1887	Succeeded by Frank B. Arnold
Preceded by Titus Sheard	New York State Senate; 23rd District; 1892–1893	Succeeded by Henry J. Coggeshall
