= John C. Jacobs =

American politician (1838–1894)

John C. Jacobs (December 16, 1838 Lancaster County, Pennsylvania – September 22, 1894 Atlantic City, Atlantic County, New Jersey) was an American politician from New York.

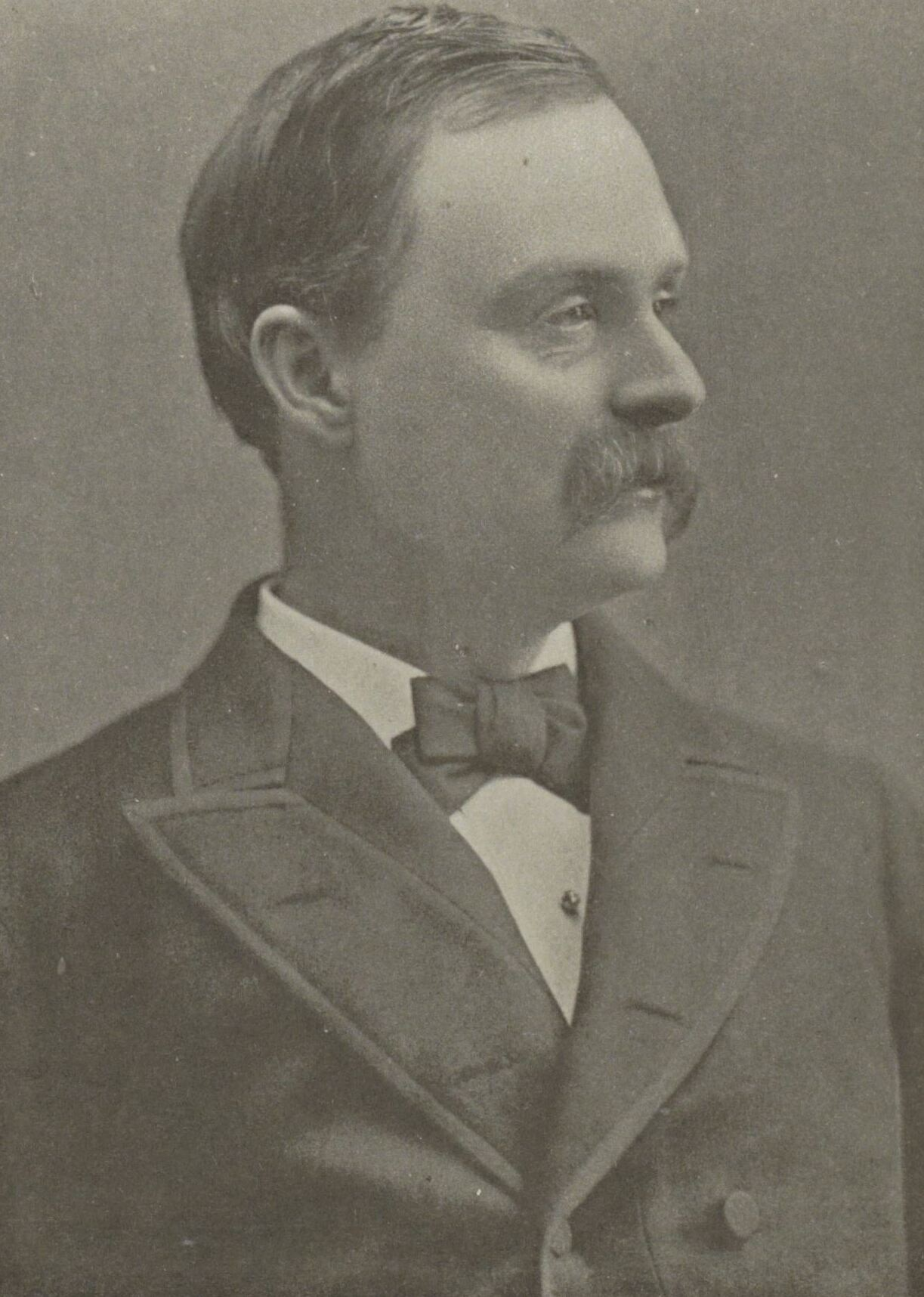
John C. Jacobs

== Life ==
In 1857, he became a reporter for the New York Express, was the paper's correspondent in Albany, New York, and was its war correspondent, accompanying the Peninsular Campaign. In 1865, he transferred to the New York World.

He was a Democratic member of the New York State Assembly (Kings Co., 9th D.) in 1867, 1868, 1869, 1870, 1871, 1872 and 1873. He was Chairman of the Committee on Ways and Means, participated in the corrupt proceedings of the Tweed Ring, and received bribes, for example a check for 2200 USD in June 1870.

He was a member of the New York State Senate from 1874 to 1885, sitting in the 97th, 98th, 99th, 100th, 101st, 102nd, 103rd, 104th, 105th, 106th, 107th and 108th New York State Legislatures. He was a delegate to the 1876 Democratic National Convention.

He was Chairman of the Democratic state convention in 1879 and was proposed as a compromise candidate for Governor, attempting to unite the Democratic Party which was split into factions led by Gov. Lucius Robinson and Tammany leader John Kelly. The Tammany followers had him nominated "by acclamation", but Jacobs declined. Later Robinson was nominated by the Democrats, and Kelly ran as an Independent, leading to the election of Republican Alonzo B. Cornell with fewer votes than Robinson and Kelly together.

In 1882, the Democrats achieved a small majority in the State Senate which had 17 Democratic and 15 Republican members. On January 2, 14 of the Democratic senators met in caucus and nominated Jacobs for President pro tem. The other three senators were absent, following instructions from Tammany Hall leader John Kelly, who objected to Jacobs. On January 3, the State Senate convened and, on motion of Jacobs, suspended Rule 3 which gave the Lieutenant Governor the right to appoint the standing committees. Thereafter, the elections of the Clerk and the President pro tempore of the State Senate were deadlocked, with the majority of the Democrats holding on to Jacobs, the Tammany men voting for John G. Boyd, and the Republicans for Dennis McCarthy. Thus the senate could not be organized, although the Lieutenant Governor presided, but after the suspension of Rule 3 no committees could be appointed, and all legislative work was blocked. The deadlock was broken on February 15 when the Republicans and the Tammany men voted to restore Rule 3, and rumors of a bargain appeared. On February 20, John W. Vrooman, the Republican Clerk of the previous year, was re-elected by the Republicans and the Tammany men. On February 21, Lt. Gov. George G. Hoskins announced the members of the committees, giving 5 out of 15 chairmanships to the three Tammany men, and no President pro tempore was chosen for this session.

On January 11, 1883, Jacobs was elected President pro tempore of the State Senate for the 106th Session.

On October 20, 1886, he married Rosalia Marie Sanger. He was again a member of the State Senate (2nd D.) in 1890 and 1891.

In 1892 he removed to Atlantic City, NJ, because of his failing health, and died there from Bright's disease.

After his death, it was alleged that 17-year-old William Warren was his son with an unknown mother.

== Sources ==
- Life Sketches of State Officers, Senators, and Members of Assembly in the State of New York in 1867 by S. R. Harlow and H. H. Boone (pages 280f; Weed, Parsons & Co., Albany NY, 1867)
- The New York Red Book (J.B. Lyon Co., 1977) (lists Jacobs for 1883 as President pro tem)
- The bribes paid by the Tweed Ring, in NYT on October 29, 1873
- "The John C. Jacobs Incident" at the Dem. State Convention, in NYT on September 12, 1879
- Jacobs nominated in Dem. caucus, in NYT on January 3, 1882
- The senate convenes, in NYT on January 4, 1882
- Still deadlocked, in NYT on January 26, 1882
- Speaker elected but senate still deadlocked, in NYT on February 3, 1882
- Rule 3 restored, in NYT on February 16, 1882
- Vrooman elected clerk, in NYT on February 21, 1882
- Committees announced by Lt. Gov., in NYT on February 22, 1882
- The "bargain", in NYT on February 24, 1882
- Marriage notice, in NYT on October 22, 1886
- Obit in NYT on September 23, 1894
- The alleged son, in NYT on December 25, 1894

New York State Assembly
Preceded by new district	New York State Assembly; Kings County, 9th District; 1867–1873	Succeeded by John McGroarty
New York State Senate
Preceded by Henry C. Murphy	New York State Senate; 3rd District; 1874–1879	Succeeded by Frederick A. Schroeder
Preceded by Edward Hogan	New York State Senate; 4th District; 1880–1885	Succeeded by Jacob Worth
Preceded by James F. Pierce	New York State Senate; 2nd District; 1890–1891	Succeeded by John McCarty
