= William Howland (American politician) =

American politician

William Howland (1823–1905) was a reformer and merchant in Sherwood, New York. He served in the 106th and 107th New York State Legislatures.

== Biography ==
William Penn Howland was born in 1823 to Slocum and Hannah Tallcot Howland, who were prominent in the Society of Friends. His sister Emily Howland and daughter Isabel Howland were strong supporters of women's rights. His father left a large inheritance in 1881 and he was able to invest in business. He went on to serve in the 106th and 107th New York State Assemblies where he championed woman's rights.

New York State Assembly
Preceded by William Leslie Noyes	New York State Assembly; Cayuga County, 2nd District; 1883–1884	Succeeded by Michael B. Van Buskirk
