= Titus Sheard =

American politician (1841–1904)

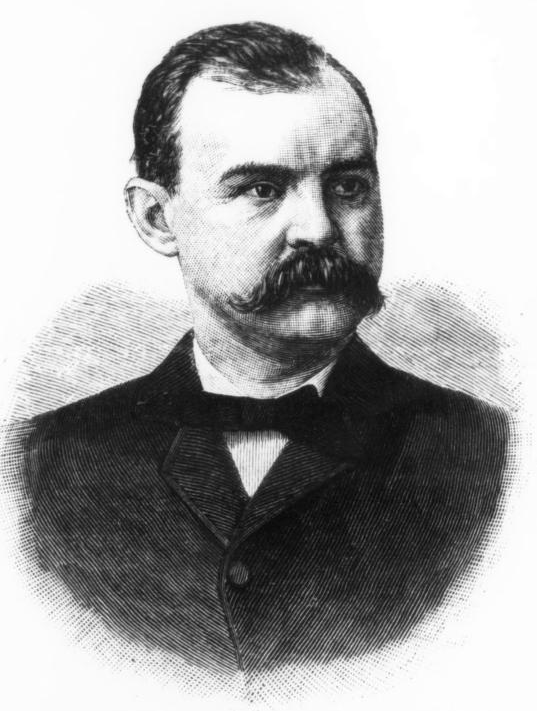
- Sketch of Sheard in an 1884 newspaper

Member of the New York Senate from the 23rd district
- In office 1890–1891
- Preceded by: Frank B. Arnold
- Succeeded by: John E. Smith

Personal details
- Born: October 4, 1841 Batley, West Riding of Yorkshire, England
- Died: April 13, 1904 (aged 62) Little Falls, New York, U.S.
- Party: Republican
- Spouse: Helen M. Waite (m. 1863)
- Children: 2
- Occupation: Businessman; politician

Titus Sheard (October 4, 1841 – April 13, 1904) was an American businessman and politician. He served as a member of the New York State Assembly from 1878 to 1879, and in 1884. He also served as a member of the New York State Senate from 1890 to 1891.

== Early life ==
Titus Sheard was born on October 4, 1841, in Batley, West Riding of Yorkshire, England. After his parents died, he came to the United States in 1856, and settled first in Mottville, New York, later in Little Falls.

== Career ==
In Little Falls, Sheard began working at a wool factory, and in 1864 became sole owner of the Eagle Knitting Mill, and in 1876 he organized the Little Falls Knitting Mill Company and he was elected president.

He was a member of the New York State Assembly, representing Herkimer County, in 1878, 1879 and 1884, and was elected Speaker in 1884 after defeating Theodore Roosevelt in the Republican assemblymen's caucus. He was a delegate to the 1884 Republican National Convention.

He was a member of the New York State Senate (23rd D.) in 1890 and 1891. He lost in his quest for renomination in the Republican State Convention at Utica, New York in October 1891 as the candidate of the Miller faction, when his adversary John E. Smith, the candidate of the Platt faction, was nominated on the 937th ballot.

Sheard served as president of the Utica Herald Company for one term.

== Personal life ==
On July 22, 1863, Sheard married Helen M. Waite, daughter of Emily C. (née Tucker) and Lorenzo D. Waite, of Little Falls. They had two daughters, Edith Isabel and Martha Talbot. He was a member of Little Falls Methodist Church and was superintendent of its sunday school for 25 years. He traveled extensively, including to Asia and Africa.

Sheard died on April 13, 1904, at his home in Little Falls.

New York State Assembly
| Preceded by Myron A. McKee | New York State Assembly; Herkimer County; 1878–1879 | Succeeded by William D. Gorsline |
| Preceded by George W. Smith | New York State Assembly; Herkimer County; 1884 | Succeeded by John M. Budlong |
Political offices
| Preceded by Alfred C. Chapin | Speaker of the New York State Assembly; 1884 | Succeeded by George Z. Erwin |
New York State Senate
| Preceded by Frank B. Arnold | New York State Senate; 23rd District; 1890–1891 | Succeeded by John E. Smith |
