= Sumner Baldwin =

American politician

Sumner Baldwin (March 8, 1833, in Ithaca, Tompkins County, New York – January 26, 1903) was an American merchant, banker and politician from New York State.

== Life ==
In 1856, he removed to Wellsville, and became a partner in his brother's grocery store. In 1866, the brothers sold the store, and engaged in tanning instead. In 1869, they sold the tanning plant, and opened the Bank of Wellsville.

In politics, he was a Republican. He was Supervisor of the Town of Wellsville for seven years.

He was a member of the New York State Assembly (Allegany Co.) in 1876 and 1877.

He was a member of the New York State Senate (27th D.) in 1882 and 1883.

== Sources ==
- Civil List and Constitutional History of the Colony and State of New York compiled by Edgar Albert Werner (1884; pg. 291 and 375f)
- Sketches of the Members of the Legislatures in The Evening Journal Almanac (1883)
- Allegany County and Its People by John Stearns Minard (e-book)

New York State Assembly
Preceded by Orrin T. Stacy	New York State Assembly; Allegany County; 1876–1877	Succeeded by Hiram H. Wakely
New York State Senate
Preceded by Ira Davenport	New York State Senate; 27th District; 1882–1883	Succeeded by J. Sloat Fassett
