= John J. Kiernan =

American politician

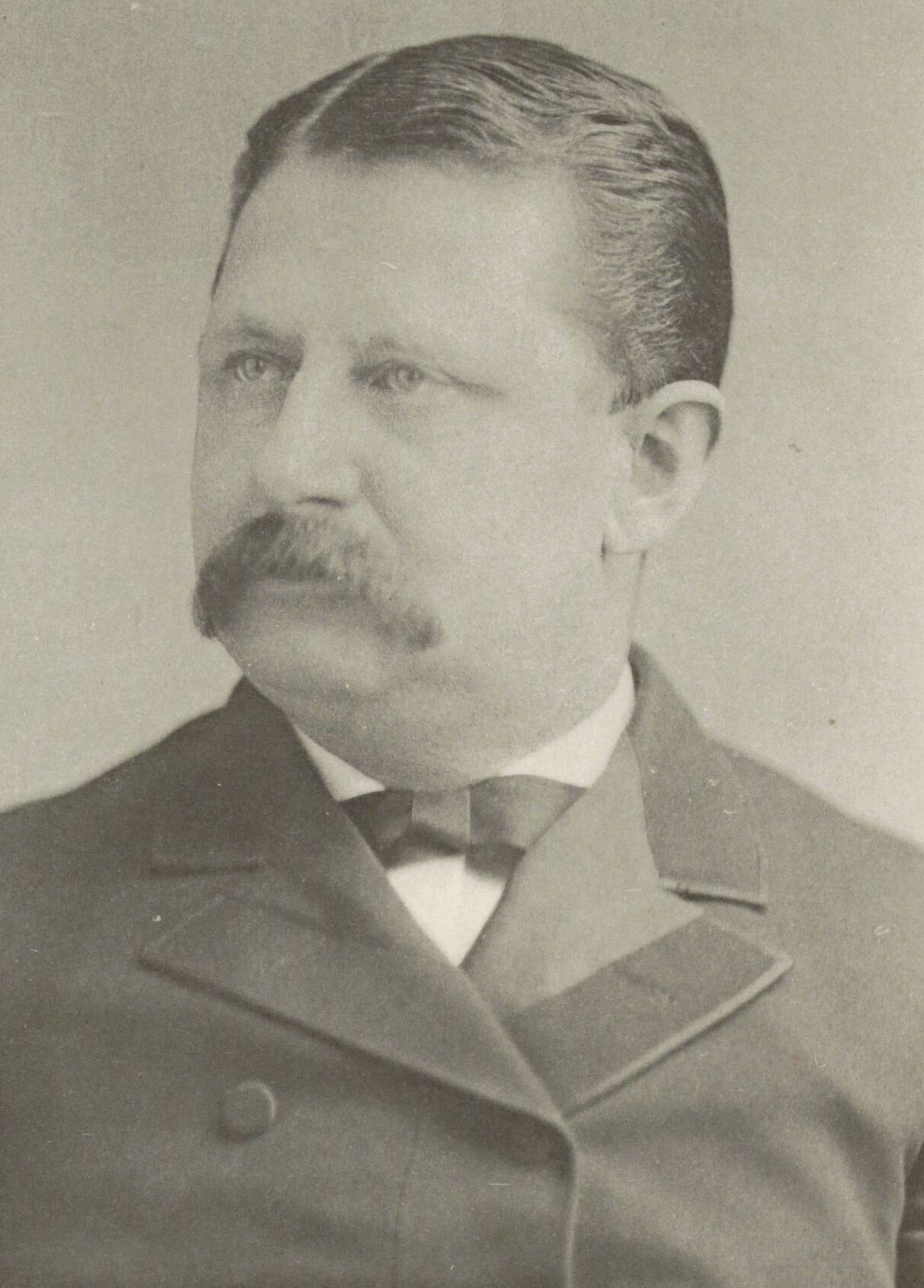

Member of the New York State Senate
- In office 1882–1885

Personal details
- Born: February 1, 1847 Brooklyn, Kings County, New York, U.S.
- Died: November 29, 1893 (aged 46) New York, U.S.
- Occupation: Politician, financial news publisher
- Known for: Founder of Kiernan Wall Street Financial News Bureau; early employer of Dow and Jones
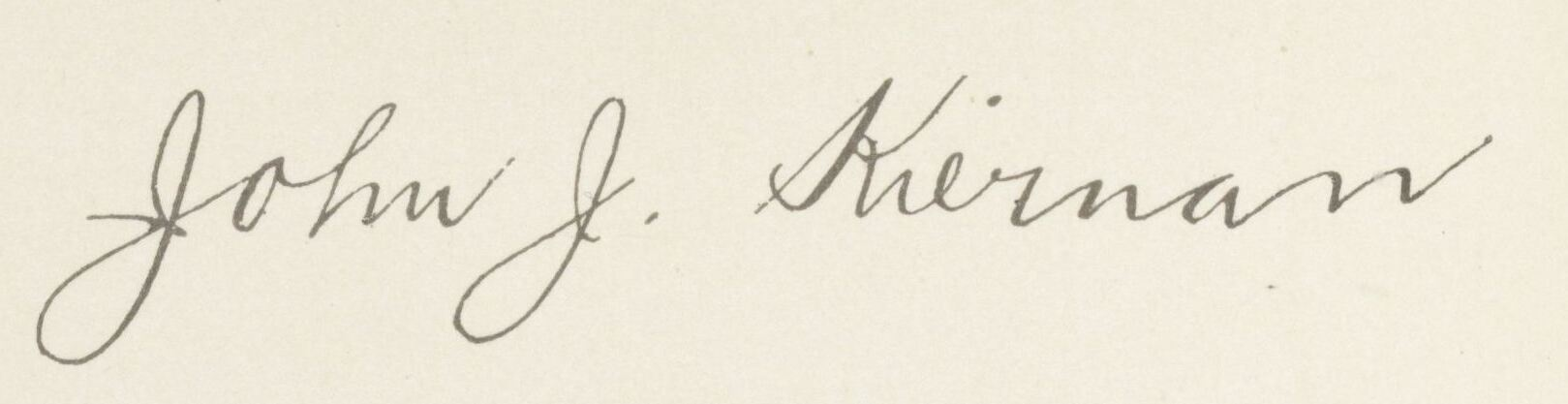
- Signature

John J. Kiernan (February 1, 1847 in Brooklyn, Kings County, New York – November 29, 1893) was an American politician from New York.

== Life ==
Kiernan began work as a messenger boy with the Magnetic Telegraph Company, and later with Western Union. In 1869, he opened his own financial news service, Kiernan Wall Street Financial News Bureau, using a stock ticker. About 1880, he hired Charles Dow and Edward Jones as financial reporters. Dow and Jones left in 1882 to found the company which would soon launch The Wall Street Journal, and Kiernan went into partnership with William P. Sullivan. Soon after the business got into trouble, and Kiernan left it in 1888.

Kiernan was a member of the New York State Senate (2nd D.) from 1882 to 1885, sitting in the 105th, 106th, 107th and 108th New York State Legislatures.

He died on November 29, 1893, of "heart failure and pneumonia".

== Sources ==
- The New York Red Book compiled by Edgar L. Murlin (published by James B. Lyon, Albany NY, 1897; pg. 403)
- Sketches of the Members of the Legislatures in The Evening Journal Almanac (1883)
- DEATH OF EX-SENATOR KIERNAN in NYT on November 30, 1893

New York State Senate
Preceded by William H. Murtha	New York State Senate; 2nd District; 1882–1885	Succeeded by James F. Pierce
