= Dominick F. Mullaney =

American politician

Dominick F. Mullaney (1903)

Dominick F. Mullaney (July 25, 1854 in New York City – August 1929) was an American politician from New York.

== Life ==
He attended the public schools and City College, and then ran a shoe store at 281 Hudson Street in New York City. He entered politics, joining Tammany Hall.

Mullaney was a member of the New York State Assembly (New York Co., 5th D.) in 1883, 1884, 1889, 1890, 1891 and 1892.

He was again a member of the State Assembly (New York Co., 3rd D.) in 1898 and 1903.

He was a member of the New York State Senate (11th D.) in 1907 and 1908 and Clerk of the New York State Senate in 1923 and 1924.

New York State Assembly
Preceded by Thomas Bogan	New York State Assembly; New York County, 5th District; 1883–1884	Succeeded by Michael Brennan
Preceded by Michael Brennan	New York State Assembly; New York County, 5th District; 1889–1892	Succeeded by Samuel J. Foley
Preceded by William H. Leonard	New York State Assembly; New York County, 3rd District; 1898	Succeeded by Michael T. Sharkey
Preceded by Anthony J. Barrett	New York State Assembly; New York County, 3rd District; 1903	Succeeded by Anthony J. Barrett
New York State Senate
Preceded by John C. Fitzgerald	New York State Senate; 11th District; 1907–1908	Succeeded by Christopher D. Sullivan
