= Dennis McCarthy (politician) =

American politician (1814–1886)

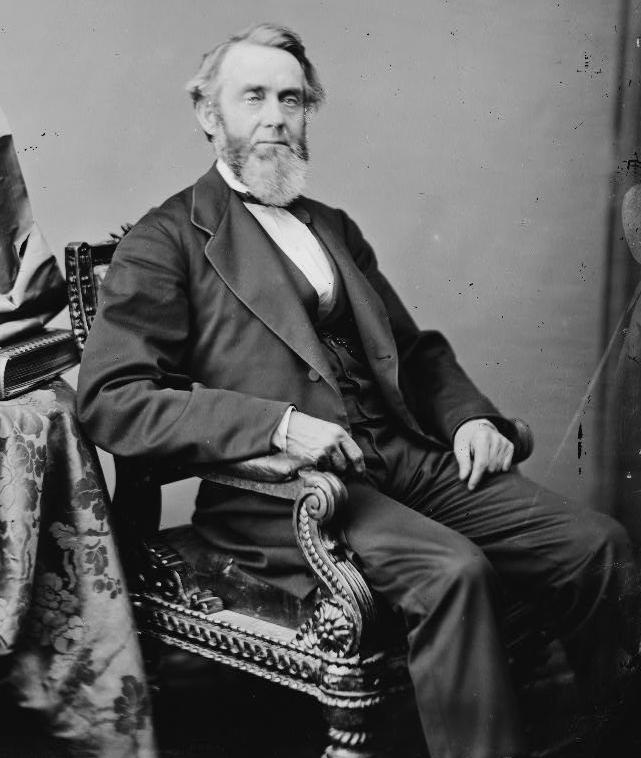

Member of the U.S. House of Representatives from New York's 23rd district
- In office March 4, 1867 - March 3, 1871
- Preceded by: Thomas T. Davis
- Succeeded by: R. Holland Duell

Member of the New York Senate from the 22nd district
- In office January 1, 1876 – December 31, 1879
- Preceded by: Daniel P. Wood
- Succeeded by: James Stevens

Member of the New York Senate from the 25th district
- In office January 1, 1880 – December 31, 1885
- Preceded by: Theodore M. Pomeroy
- Succeeded by: Francis Hendricks

Acting Lieutenant Governor of New York
- In office January 6, 1885 – December 31, 1885
- Governor: David B. Hill
- Preceded by: David B. Hill
- Succeeded by: Edward F. Jones

Personal details
- Born: March 19, 1814 Salina, New York, US
- Died: February 14, 1886 (aged 71) Syracuse, New York, US
- Party: Republican
- Profession: Politician, Manufacturer

Dennis McCarthy (March 19, 1814 – February 14, 1886) was an American manufacturer and politician from New York.

== Life ==
He was the son of Thomas McCarthy. He attended Valley Academy in Salina and engaged in the manufacturing of salt. In the early 1840s he went into business operating a general store with his brother-in-law Silas Titus.

He was a Democratic member of the New York State Assembly (Onondaga Co.) in 1845, and was Mayor of Syracuse, New York, in 1853.

He was elected as a Republican to the 40th and 41st United States Congresses, holding office from March 4, 1867, to March 3, 1871. Afterwards he resumed his former business pursuits. In 1878 mayor James J. Belden formed a committee of citizens, St. Joseph's Hospital Aid Society, to look after the interests of St. Joseph's Hospital. McCarthy followed Theodore Dissel as president.

He was a member of the New York State Senate from 1876 to 1885, sitting in the 99th, 100th, 101st, 102nd, 103rd, 104th, 105th, 106th, 107th and 108th New York State Legislatures; and was President pro tempore in 1881, 1884 and 1885. He became Acting Lieutenant Governor of New York in 1885 after the resignation of Governor Grover Cleveland and the succession of Lt. Gov. David B. Hill to the governorship.

He died in Syracuse, New York, on February 14, 1886, and was buried at Saint Agnes Cemetery in Syracuse.

== Sources ==
- United States Congress. "Dennis McCarthy (id: M000310)". Biographical Directory of the United States Congress.

U.S. House of Representatives
Preceded by Thomas T. Davis	Member of the U.S. House of Representatives from New York's 23rd congressional district 1867–1871	Succeeded by R. Holland Duell
New York State Senate
Preceded by Daniel P. Wood	New York State Senate; 22nd District; 1876–1879	Succeeded by James Stevens
Preceded by Theodore M. Pomeroy	New York State Senate; 25th District; 1880–1885	Succeeded by Francis Hendricks
Political offices
Preceded by William H. Robertson	President pro tempore of the New York State Senate; 1881	Succeeded by John C. Jacobs
Preceded by John C. Jacobs	President pro tempore of the New York State Senate; 1884–1885	Succeeded by Edmund L. Pitts
Preceded by David B. Hill	Lieutenant Governor of New York; Acting; 1885	Succeeded by Edward F. Jones
