= 105th New York State Legislature =

New York state legislative session

←	104th	106th	→
- New York State Capitol (2009)

Overview
- Legislative body: New York State Legislature
- Jurisdiction: New York, United States
- Term: January 1 – December 31, 1882

Senate
- Members: 32
- President: Lt. Gov. George G. Hoskins (R)
- Temporary President: vacant
- Party control: unclear

Assembly
- Members: 128
- Speaker: Charles E. Patterson (D)
- Party control: Democratic (67-61)

Sessions
- 1st: January 3 – June 2, 1882

The 105th New York State Legislature, consisting of the New York State Senate and the New York State Assembly, met from January 3 to June 2, 1882, during the third year of Alonzo B. Cornell's governorship, in Albany.

== Background ==
Under the provisions of the New York Constitution of 1846, 32 Senators and 128 assemblymen were elected in single-seat districts; senators for a two-year term, assemblymen for a one-year term. The senatorial districts were made up of entire counties, except New York County (seven districts) and Kings County (three districts). The Assembly districts were made up of entire towns, or city wards, forming a contiguous area, all within the same county.

At this time there were two major political parties: the Republican Party and the Democratic Party. The Greenback Party and the Prohibition Party also nominated tickets.

== Elections ==
The 1881 New York state election was held on November 8. Of the statewide elective offices up for election, five were carried by the Republicans and one by a Democrat. The approximate party strength at this election, as expressed by the vote for Secretary of State, was: Republican 417,000; Democratic 404,000; Greenback 16,000; and Prohibition 4,500.

== Sessions ==
The Legislature met for the regular session at the State Capitol in Albany on January 3, 1882; and adjourned on June 2.

The Senate had 15 Republicans, 14 Democrats and 3 Tammany men; the Assembly had 61 Republicans, 59 Democrats and 8 Tammany men. In both Houses, the Tammany men were in a balance of power position, and deadlock ensued. Tammany Boss John Kelly objected to the election of John C. Jacobs as president pro tempore of the State Senate, and the office remained vacant throughout the session.

On February 2, Charles E. Patterson (D) was elected Speaker with 59 votes against 51 for Thomas G. Alvord (R).

On February 20, John W. Vrooman (R) was re-elected Clerk of the State Senate with the votes of the Tammany men; and the right to appoint the standing committees was transferred to Lt. Gov. George G. Hoskins (R).

== State Senate ==
=== Districts ===
- 1st District: Queens and Suffolk counties
- 2nd District: 1st, 2nd, 5th, 6th, 8th, 9th, 10th, 12th and 22nd Ward of the City of Brooklyn, and the towns of Flatbush, Gravesend and New Utrecht in Kings County
- 3rd District: 3rd, 4th, 7th, 11th, 13th, 19th, 20th, 21st and 23rd Ward of the City of Brooklyn
- 4th District: 14th, 15th, 16th, 17th, 18th, 24th and 25th Ward of the City of Brooklyn, and the towns of New Lots and Flatlands in Kings County
- 5th District: Richmond County and the 1st, 2nd, 3rd, 5th, 6th, 8th, 14th and parts of the 4th and 9th Ward of New York City
- 6th District: 7th, 11th, 13th and part of the 4th Ward of NYC
- 7th District: 10th, 17th and part of the 15th, 18th and 21st Ward of NYC
- 8th District: 16th and part of the 9th, 15th, 18th, 20th and 21st Ward of NYC
- 9th District: Part of the 18th, 19th and 21st Ward of NYC
- 10th District: Part of the 12th, 19th, 20th, 21st and 22nd Ward of NYC
- 11th District: 23rd and 24th, and part of the 12th, 20th and 22nd Ward of NYC
- 12th District: Rockland and Westchester counties
- 13th District: Orange and Sullivan counties
- 14th District: Greene, Schoharie and Ulster counties
- 15th District: Columbia, Dutchess and Putnam counties
- 16th District: Rensselaer and Washington counties
- 17th District: Albany County
- 18th District: Fulton, Hamilton, Montgomery, Saratoga and Schenectady counties
- 19th District: Clinton, Essex and Warren counties
- 20th District: Franklin, Lewis and St. Lawrence counties
- 21st District: Oswego and Jefferson counties
- 22nd District: Oneida County
- 23rd District: Herkimer, Madison and Otsego counties
- 24th District: Chenango, Delaware and Broome counties
- 25th District: Onondaga and Cortland counties
- 26th District: Cayuga, Seneca, Tompkins and Tioga counties
- 27th District: Allegany, Chemung and Steuben counties
- 28th District: Ontario, Schuyler, Wayne and Yates counties
- 29th District: Monroe and Orleans counties
- 30th District: Genesee, Livingston, Niagara and Wyoming counties
- 31st District: Erie County
- 32nd District: Cattaraugus and Chautauqua counties

Note: There are now 62 counties in the State of New York. The counties which are not mentioned in this list had not yet been established, or sufficiently organized, the area being included in one or more of the abovementioned counties.

=== Members ===
The asterisk (*) denotes members of the previous Legislature who continued in office as members of this Legislature. Charles H. Russell, John W. Browning and Shepard P. Bowen changed from the Assembly to the Senate.

District	Senator	Party	Notes
1st	James W. Covert	Democrat	
2nd	John J. Kiernan	Democrat	
3rd	Charles H. Russell*	Republican	
4th	John C. Jacobs*	Democrat	re-elected
5th	John G. Boyd	Tammany	
6th	Thomas F. Grady	Tammany	
7th	James Daly	Democrat	
8th	John W. Browning*	Democrat	
9th	James Fitzgerald	Democrat	
10th	Joseph Koch	Democrat	
11th	Frank P. Treanor	Tammany	
12th	Henry C. Nelson	Democrat	
13th	James Mackin	Democrat	
14th	Addison P. Jones	Democrat	
15th	Homer A. Nelson	Democrat	
16th	Charles L. MacArthur	Republican	
17th	Abraham Lansing	Democrat	
18th	Webster Wagner*	Republican	re-elected; died on January 13, 1882
18th	Alexander B. Baucus	Democrat	elected on February 28, to fill vacancy
19th	Shepard P. Bowen*	Republican	
20th	Dolphus S. Lynde*	Republican	re-elected
21st	Frederick Lansing	Republican	
22nd	Robert H. Roberts	Democrat	
23rd	Alexander M. Holmes	Republican	
24th	Edward B. Thomas	Republican	
25th	Dennis McCarthy*	Republican	re-elected
26th	David H. Evans	Republican	
27th	Sumner Baldwin	Republican	
28th	George P. Lord*	Republican	re-elected
29th	Edmund L. Pitts*	Republican	re-elected
30th	Timothy E. Ellsworth	Republican	
31st	Robert C. Titus	Democrat	
32nd	Norman M. Allen	Republican	

=== Employees ===
- Clerk: John W. Vrooman
- Sergeant-at-Arms: John W. Corning
- Doorkeeper: Charles F. Brady
- Stenographer: Hudson C. Tanner

== State Assembly ==
=== Assemblymen ===
The asterisk (*) denotes members of the previous Legislature who continued as members of this Legislature.

District		Assemblymen	Party	Notes
Albany	1st	Michael J. Gorman	Democrat	
Albany	2nd	Aaron Fuller	Democrat	
Albany	3rd	Amasa J. Parker Jr.	Democrat	
Albany	4th	John McDonough	Democrat	
Allegany		Washington Moses	Republican	
Broome		Francis B. Smith	Democrat	
Cattaraugus	1st	Elisha M. Johnson	Republican	
Cattaraugus	2nd	Elijah R. Schoonmaker	Republican	
Cayuga	1st	Thomas Hunter*	Republican	
Cayuga	2nd	William Leslie Noyes	Republican	
Chautauqua	1st	Albert B. Sheldon*	Republican	
Chautauqua	2nd	Milton M. Fenner*	Republican	
Chemung		Orville P. Dimon	Democrat	
Chenango		Silas W. Berry	Republican	
Clinton		Benjamin D. Clapp	Republican	
Columbia		Abram L. Schermerhorn	Democrat	
Cortland		Alburtis A. Carley*	Republican	
Delaware		Chester H. Treadwell	Republican	
Dutchess	1st	Alfred Bonney	Republican	
Dutchess	2nd	John O'Brien	Democrat	
Erie	1st	Jeremiah Higgins*	Democrat	
Erie	2nd	Frank Sipp*	Republican	
Erie	3rd	Arthur W. Hickman*	Ind. Rep.	
Erie	4th	Timothy W. Jackson	Democrat	
Erie	5th	Job Southwick Jr.	Republican	
Essex		James W. Sheehy*	Republican	
Franklin		William T. O'Neil	Republican	
Fulton and Hamilton		James W. Green	Democrat	
Genesee		Joseph W. Holmes*	Republican	
Greene		Samuel H. Nichols	Democrat	
Herkimer		Albert M. Ross	Republican	
Jefferson	1st	Isaac L. Hunt Jr.	Republican	
Jefferson	2nd	Henry Binninger*	Republican	
Kings	1st	John Shanley*	Democrat	Chairman of Railroads
Kings	2nd	Michael J. Hannan	Democrat	
Kings	3rd	James G. Tighe	Democrat	
Kings	4th	Daniel M. Kelly	Democrat	
Kings	5th	Thomas J. Sheridan*	Democrat	
Kings	6th	Patrick H. McCarren	Democrat	
Kings	7th	George H. Lindsay	Democrat	
Kings	8th	Moses Engle*	Democrat	
Kings	9th	James W. Monk	Republican	
Kings	10th	Richard J. Newman*	Democrat	
Kings	11th	Alfred C. Chapin	Democrat	
Kings	12th	Jaques J. Stillwell*	Democrat	
Lewis		G. Henry P. Gould	Democrat	
Livingston		Kidder M. Scott*	Republican	
Madison		Ladurna Ballard	Republican	
Monroe	1st	Judson F. Sheldon	Republican	
Monroe	2nd	Charles S. Baker	Republican	
Monroe	3rd	Alexander P. Butts	Democrat	
Montgomery		Cornelius Van Buren*	Republican	
New York	1st	Michael C. Murphy*	Democrat	Chairman of Affairs of Cities
New York	2nd	Thomas Maher	Tammany	
New York	3rd	William H. McIntyre	Democrat	
New York	4th	John F. Ahearn	Democrat	
New York	5th	Thomas Bogan*	Tammany	
New York	6th	Matthew Patten*	Tammany	
New York	7th	Lucas L. Van Allen	Republican	
New York	8th	John E. Brodsky*	Republican	
New York	9th	James D. McClelland	Democrat	
New York	10th	John C. Niglutsch	Republican	
New York	11th	J. Hampden Robb	Democrat	
New York	12th	David Gideon	Democrat	
New York	13th	Henry L. Sprague	Republican	
New York	14th	James J. Costello	Tammany	
New York	15th	Jacob Cooper	Democrat	
New York	16th	James Edward Morrison	Democrat	
New York	17th	Michael J. Costello	Democrat	
New York	18th	John J. Cullen	Tammany	
New York	19th	John McManus	Tammany	
New York	20th	James Haggerty	Tammany	Chairman of Grievances
New York	21st	Theodore Roosevelt	Republican	
New York	22nd	Edward C. Sheehy	Tammany	
New York	23rd	Leroy Bowers Crane	Republican	
New York	24th	Matthew P. Breen	Democrat	
Niagara	1st	Joseph W. Higgins	Democrat	
Niagara	2nd	Thomas Vincent Welch	Democrat	
Oneida	1st	Patrick Griffin	Republican	
Oneida	2nd	Morris R. Jones	Democrat	
Oneida	3rd	Frank A. Edgerton	Republican	
Onondaga	1st	Thomas G. Alvord*	Republican	Minority Leader
Onondaga	2nd	Elbert O. Farrar	Republican	
Onondaga	3rd	John Lighton	Democrat	
Ontario		John Raines*	Republican	
Orange	1st	Joseph Lomas	Democrat	
Orange	2nd	William Harvey Clark*	Democrat	
Orleans		Henry M. Hard	Republican	
Oswego	1st	William A. Poucher	Democrat	Chairman of Judiciary
Oswego	2nd	Byron Helm	Republican	
Otsego	1st	J. Stanley Browne*	Democrat	
Otsego	2nd	Henry T. Harris	Republican	
Putnam		Robert A. Livingston	Republican	
Queens	1st	Townsend D. Cock*	Democrat	
Queens	2nd	John J. Mitchell	Democrat	
Rensselaer	1st	Charles E. Patterson*	Democrat	elected Speaker
Rensselaer	2nd	Richard A. Derrick*	Republican	
Rensselaer	3rd	Rufus Sweet	Democrat	
Richmond		Erastus Brooks*	Democrat	Chairman of Ways and Means
Rockland		John Cleary*	Democrat	
St. Lawrence	1st	Abel Godard	Republican	
St. Lawrence	2nd	Worth Chamberlain*	Republican	
St. Lawrence	3rd	George Z. Erwin	Republican	
Saratoga	1st	Benjamin F. Baker*	Republican	
Saratoga	2nd	Delcour S. Potter*	Republican	
Schenectady		John D. Campbell	Democrat	
Schoharie		Edwin D. Hager	Democrat	
Schuyler		Minor T. Jones	Republican	
Seneca		Albert M. Patterson	Republican	
Steuben	1st	Orange S. Searl	Democrat	
Steuben	2nd	Allen A. Van Orsdale	Republican	
Suffolk		George M. Fletcher	Republican	
Sullivan		Edward H. Pinney*	Democrat	
Tioga		Jacob B. Floyd	Republican	
Tompkins		John E. Beers	Republican	
Ulster	1st	George H. Sharpe*	Republican	
Ulster	2nd	Eugene F. Patten	Democrat	
Ulster	3rd	Thomas E. Benedict*	Democrat	
Warren		Nelson W. Van Dusen	Democrat	
Washington	1st	Robert Armstrong Jr.	Republican	
Washington	2nd	George Northup	Democrat	
Wayne	1st	Oscar Weed	Republican	
Wayne	2nd	William E. Greenwood	Republican	
Westchester	1st	Edwin R. Keyes	Democrat	
Westchester	2nd	William H. Catlin*	Democrat	
Westchester	3rd	George W. Robertson	Republican	
Wyoming		Henry N. Page	Republican	
Yates		John T. Andrews 2nd	Republican	

=== Employees ===
- Clerk: Edward M. Johnson, from February 15
- Sergeant-at-Arms: vacant
- Doorkeeper: Henry Wheeler
- Stenographer: James M. Ruso

== Sources ==
- Civil List and Constitutional History of the Colony and State of New York compiled by Edgar Albert Werner (1884; see pg. 276 for Senate districts; pg. 291 for senators; pg. 298–304 for Assembly districts; and pg. 380f for assemblymen)
- Sketches of the Members of the Legislature in The Evening Journal Almanac (1882)
- THE ASSEMBLY COMMITTEES in The New York Times on February 15, 1882
