= Charles E. Patterson =

American politician

Charles Edward Patterson (May 3, 1842 – February 22, 1913) was an American lawyer and politician.

== Life ==
Charles E. Patterson was born in Corinth, Vermont on May 3, 1842, the son of Dr. James Hervey Patterson. He was educated at Castleton Seminary in Castleton, Vermont and Cambridge Academy in Cambridge, New York, and graduated from Union College in 1860. He studied law, was admitted to the bar, and practiced in Troy, New York where he became a partner in the firm of David L. Seymour whose daughter he married.

He was a member of the New York State Assembly (Rensselaer Co., 1st D.) in 1881 and 1882; and was elected Speaker on February 2, 1882, after a month-long struggle of the different factions of the Democratic Party. The rural Democrats and the County Democracy had tried to oppose John Kelly and Tammany Hall, but eventually came to terms.

Charles E. Patterson died in Augusta, Georgia on February 22, 1913.

New York State Assembly
Preceded by La Mott W. Rhodes	New York State Assembly; Rensselaer County, 1st District; 1881–1882	Succeeded by William V. Cleary
Political offices
Preceded by George H. Sharpe	Speaker of the New York State Assembly; 1882	Succeeded by Alfred C. Chapin
