= Michael E. Butler =

American politician

Michael E. Butler (May 5, 1855 – August 3, 1926) was an American politician from New York.

== Life ==
Butler was born on May 5, 1855, in New York City, the son of Edmund Butler. After finishing school he worked in the stevedoring business with his father and brother.

In 1882, Butler was elected to the New York State Assembly as a Democrat, representing the Kings County 1st District. He served in the Assembly in 1883 and 1884. He sat in the Assembly with Theodore Roosevelt and despite their different backgrounds and political beliefs struck a strong friendship. In the 1910 United States House of Representatives election, he was the Democratic candidate for New York's 6th congressional district. He lost the election to William M. Calder. He was a delegate to the 1912 Democratic National Convention.

Butler died at his summer home in Quogue on August 3, 1926. He was buried in Calvary Cemetery.

New York State Assembly
Preceded by John Shanley	New York State Assembly; Kings County, 1st District; 1883-1884	Succeeded by Moses J. Wafer
