= William T. O'Neil =

American politician

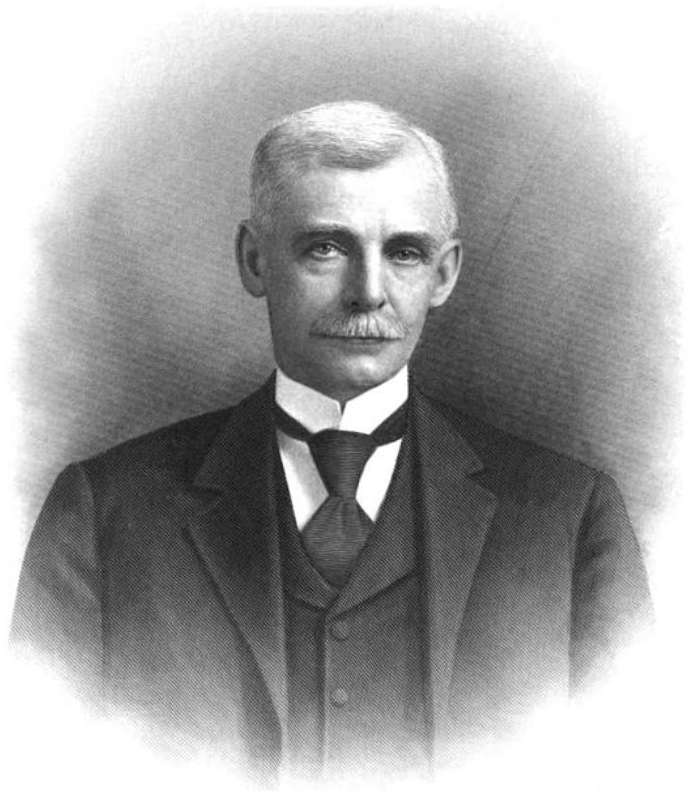

Member of the New York State Senate
- In office 1907–1909
- Constituency: 34th District

Member of the New York State Assembly
- In office 1882–1885
- Constituency: Franklin County

Personal details
- Born: February 7, 1850 Brighton, New York, U.S.
- Died: May 5, 1909 (aged 59) St. Regis Falls, New York, U.S.

William Thomas O'Neil (February 7, 1850 – May 5, 1909) was an American politician from New York.

== Biography ==
William T. O'Neil was born in Brighton, Franklin County, New York on February 7, 1850. He attended the common schools and Fort Edward Collegiate Institute. Then he engaged in the lumber business and farming. He lived in St. Regis Falls, a hamlet in the town of Waverly.

O'Neil was Supervisor of Waverly in 1881; and a member of the New York State Assembly (Franklin Co.) in 1882, 1883, 1884 and 1885.

He was a presidential elector in 1900.

He was a member of the New York State Senate (34th D.) from 1907 until his death in 1909, sitting in the 130th, 131st and 132nd New York State Legislatures. He suffered a stroke, and had to be rolled into the Senate chamber in a wheel-chair in January and February 1909. In March, he became too ill to attend the legislative session, and died on May 5, 1909, at his home in St. Regis Falls.

== Sources ==
- Official New York from Cleveland to Hughes by Charles Elliott Fitch (Hurd Publishing Co., New York and Buffalo, 1911, Vol. IV; pg. 315, 317f and 366f)
- Sketches of the Members of the Legislature in The Evening Journal Almanac (1882)

New York State Assembly
Preceded by Samuel A. Beman	New York State Assembly; Franklin County; 1882–1885	Succeeded by Floyd J. Hadley
New York State Senate
Preceded by Henry J. Coggeshall	New York State Senate; 34th District; 1907–1909	Succeeded by Herbert P. Coats
