= Frederick Lansing =

American politician

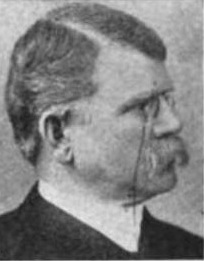
- Frederick Lansing, Congressman from New York
- Born: February 16, 1838; Manheim, New York
- Died: January 31, 1894 (aged 55); Watertown, New York
- Known for: U.S. Representative from New York

Frederick Lansing (February 16, 1838 – January 31, 1894) was a U.S. representative from New York.

== Biography ==
Born in Manheim, New York, Lansing attended the Little Falls Academy, New York. He studied law. He was admitted to the bar in 1859, and practiced in Watertown, New York. He served during the Civil War in the Eighth New York Cavalry; was acting adjutant of that regiment from June 23 to October 11, 1863. He was a member of the New York State Senate (21st D.) from 1882 to 1885, sitting in the 105th, 106th, 107th and 108th New York State Legislatures.

Lansing was elected as a Republican to the 51st United States Congress, holding office from March 4, 1889, to March 3, 1891.

He died on January 31, 1894, in Watertown, New York, and was interred in Brookside Cemetery.

== Sources ==
- United States Congress. "Frederick Lansing (id: L000085)". Biographical Directory of the United States Congress.

New York State Senate
Preceded by Bradley Winslow	New York State Senate; 21st District; 1882–1885	Succeeded by George B. Sloan
U.S. House of Representatives
Preceded by Abraham X. Parker	Member of the U.S. House of Representatives from New York's 22nd congressional district 1889–1891	Succeeded by Leslie W. Russell
