= Robert H. Roberts =

American politician

- Born: June 5, 1837
- Died: September 3, 1888 (aged 51)
- Occupation: politician

Robert H. Roberts (June 5, 1837 – September 3, 1888) was an American politician from New York.

== Life ==
Roberts was born in Nantglyn, Denbighshire, Wales. The family emigrated to the United States in 1839, and settled in Constableville, New York. He attended the common schools and Boonville High School. Then he became a carpenter and builder of oil tanks; and later a farmer and builder of canal boats, in Boonville.

He entered politics as a Republican, joined the Liberal Republicans in 1872, and afterwards became a Democrat. He was Supervisor of the Town of Boonville in 1874 and 1875; a member of the New York State Assembly (Oneida Co., 4th D.) in 1878; President of the Village of Boonville in 1880; and a member of the New York State Senate (22nd D.) in 1882 and 1883.

He was accidentally killed on September 3, 1888, at his boatyard in Boonville, New York, when a wooden block fell on him and broke his neck. He was buried at the Boonville Cemetery.

== Sources ==
- Civil List and Constitutional History of the Colony and State of New York compiled by Edgar Albert Werner (1884; pg. 291 and 377)
- Sketches of the Members of the Legislatures in The Evening Journal Almanac (1883)
- EX-SENATOR ROBERTS KILLED in New York Times on September 4, 1888

New York State Assembly
Preceded by J. Robert Moore	New York State Assembly; Oneida County, 4th District; 1878	Succeeded by H. Dwight Grant
New York State Senate
Preceded by James Stevens	New York State Senate; 22nd District; 1882–1883	Succeeded by Henry J. Coggeshall
