= Shepard P. Bowen =

American politician

Shepard Pike Bowen
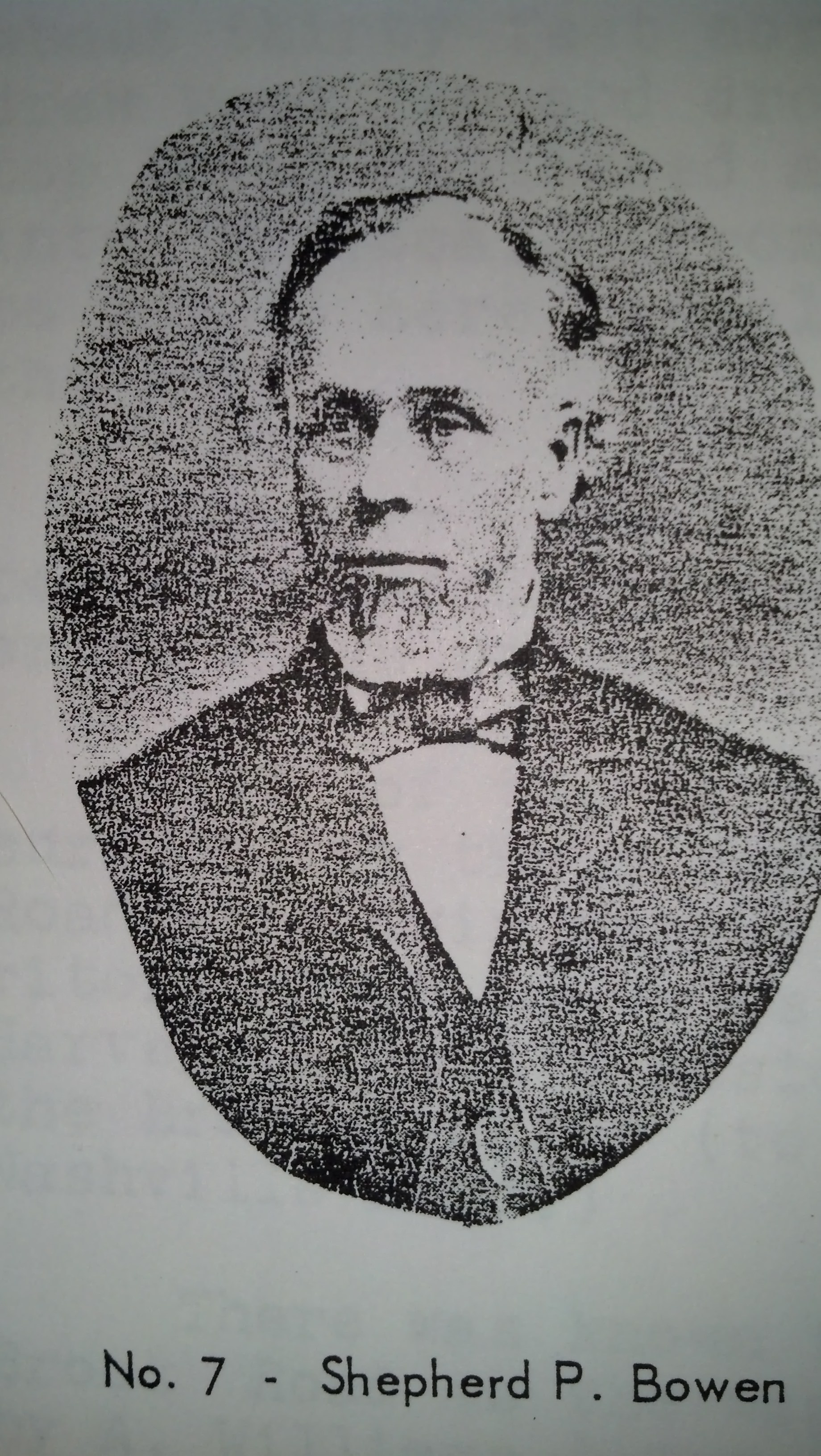
- Found in "Saranac Valley" by Sarah Baker
- Born: 28 March 1824; Potton, Quebec, Canada
- Died: 1908
- Burial place: Riverside Cemetery, Plattsburgh

Shepard Pike Bowen (March 28, 1824 – 1908) was an American merchant, manufacturer and politician from New York.

== Life ==
He was born in Potton, Quebec, Canada, the son of Nathan Bourn and Clarissa (Pike) Bourn. The family removed to Troy, Vermont. There he attended the common schools, and worked on his father's farm. Later he became a merchant, and finally an iron manufacturer in Plattsburgh, New York. On June 24, 1852, he married Susan Harriet Parsons (1834–1853) who died two weeks after giving birth to their only child Susie Parsons Bowen (1853–1932). In 1854, he married Emily Julia Signor (1831–1917).

He was Supervisor of the Town of Plattsburgh for many terms, beginning in 1855.

He was a member of the New York State Assembly (Clinton Co.) in 1875, 1876, 1877 and 1881.

He was a member of the New York State Senate (19th D.) from 1882 to 1885, sitting in the 105th, 106th, 107th and 108th New York State Legislatures.

He was buried at the Riverside Cemetery in Plattsburgh.

== Sources ==
- Civil List and Constitutional History of the Colony and State of New York compiled by Edgar Albert Werner (1884; pg. 291, 375f and 379)
- Life Sketches of Government Officers and Members of the Legislature of the State of New York in 1875 by W. H. McElroy and Alexander McBride (pg. 142)
- Across the Border edited by Diana Hibbert Bailey (1988)
- Parsons Family by Henry Parsons (1912; pg. 231 and 325)
- Riverside Cemetery transcriptions

New York State Assembly
Preceded by Smith M. Weed	New York State Assembly; Clinton County; 1875–1877	Succeeded by William P. Mooers
Preceded by William P. Mooers	New York State Assembly; Clinton County; 1881	Succeeded by Benjamin D. Clapp
New York State Senate
Preceded by William W. Rockwell	New York State Senate; 19th District; 1882–1885	Succeeded by Rowland C. Kellogg
