= Robert C. Titus =

American politician

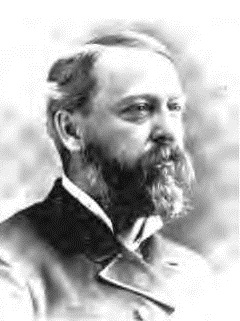
Robert C. Titus (1897)

Robert Cyrus Titus (October 24, 1839 – April 27, 1918) was an American lawyer and politician from New York.

== Life ==
He was born on October 24, 1839, in Eden, Erie County, New York. He attended the common schools, and Oberlin College in 1859 and 1860. Then he studied law with Horace Boies, was admitted to the bar in 1865, and practiced in Hamburg. In 1867, he married Arvilla Clark, and they had two children. He was Supervisor of the Town of Hamburg from 1868 to 1871.

In 1873, he removed to Buffalo. He was District Attorney of Erie County from 1878 to 1880; and a member of the New York State Senate (31st D.) from 1882 to 1885, sitting in the 105th, 106th, 107th and 108th New York State Legislatures.

He was a judge of the Buffalo Superior Court from 1886 to 1895. The court was abolished by the Constitution of 1894, and the judges were transferred, with limited jurisdiction, to the New York Supreme Court (8th D.) in January 1896, to sit until their original terms expired.

At the New York state election, 1896, he ran for the New York Court of Appeals, but was defeated by Republican Irving G. Vann.

In 1901, Titus and Loran L. Lewis were appointed by the court to defend Leon Czolgosz at his trial for the assassination of President McKinley.

He died on April 27, 1918, in Buffalo, New York.

== Sources ==
- The New York Red Book compiled by Edgar L. Murlin (published by James B. Lyon, Albany NY, 1897; pg. 403)
- Biographical sketches of the Members of the Legislature in The Evening Journal Almanac (1885)
- THE NEW SUPREME COURT in NYT on December 13, 1895
- Bio transcribed from Our County and Its People: A Descriptive Work on Erie County, New York by Truman C. White (1898)
- Titus genealogy at Gen Forum
- Obituary transcribed from the Buffalo Morning Express on April 28, 1918

New York State Senate
Preceded by Benjamin H. Williams	New York State Senate; 31st District; 1882–1885	Succeeded by Daniel H. McMillan
