= 106th New York State Legislature =

New York state legislative session

←	105th	107th	→
- New York State Capitol (2009)

Overview
- Legislative body: New York State Legislature
- Jurisdiction: New York, United States
- Term: January 1 – December 31, 1883

Senate
- Members: 32
- President: Lt. Gov. David B. Hill (D)
- Temporary President: John C. Jacobs (D)
- Party control: Democratic (18-14)

Assembly
- Members: 128
- Speaker: Alfred C. Chapin (D)
- Party control: Democratic (85-43)

Sessions
- 1st: January 2 – May 4, 1883

The 106th New York State Legislature, consisting of the New York State Senate and the New York State Assembly, met in Albany from January 2 to May 4, 1883, during the first year of administration of Grover Cleveland

== Background ==
Under the provisions of the New York Constitution of 1846, 32 Senators and 128 assemblymen were elected in single-seat districts; senators for a two-year term, assemblymen for a one-year term. The senatorial districts were made up of entire counties, except New York County (seven districts) and Kings County (three districts). The Assembly districts were made up of entire towns, or city wards, forming a contiguous area, all within the same county.

At this time there were two major political parties: the Democratic Party and the Republican Party. In New York City the Democrats were split into three factions: Tammany Hall, "Irving Hall" and the "County Democrats". The Prohibition Party and the Greenback Party also nominated tickets.

== Elections ==
The 1882 New York state election was held on November 7. Democrats Grover Cleveland and David B. Hill were elected Governor and Lieutenant Governor. The other two statewide elective offices up for election were also carried by the Democrats. The approximate party strength at this election, as expressed by the vote for Governor, was: Democratic 535,000; Republican 342,000; Prohibition 26,000; and Greenback 12,000.

== Sessions ==
The Legislature met for the regular session at the State Capitol in Albany on January 2, 1883; and adjourned on May 4.

Alfred C. Chapin (D) was elected Speaker with 84 votes against 41 for Theodore Roosevelt (R).

On January 11, John C. Jacobs (D) was elected president pro tempore of the State Senate.

On March 14, the Legislature elected William B. Ruggles (Dem.) as Superintendent of Public Instructions, with 94 votes against 52 for Neil Gilmour (Rep.), to succeed Gilmour for a term of three years.

== State Senate ==
=== Districts ===
- 1st District: Queens and Suffolk counties
- 2nd District: 1st, 2nd, 5th, 6th, 8th, 9th, 10th, 12th and 22nd Ward of the City of Brooklyn, and the towns of Flatbush, Gravesend and New Utrecht in Kings County
- 3rd District: 3rd, 4th, 7th, 11th, 13th, 19th, 20th, 21st and 23rd Ward of the City of Brooklyn
- 4th District: 14th, 15th, 16th, 17th, 18th, 24th and 25th Ward of the City of Brooklyn, and the towns of New Lots and Flatlands in Kings County
- 5th District: Richmond County and the 1st, 2nd, 3rd, 5th, 6th, 8th, 14th and parts of the 4th and 9th Ward of New York City
- 6th District: 7th, 11th, 13th and part of the 4th Ward of NYC
- 7th District: 10th, 17th and part of the 15th, 18th and 21st Ward of NYC
- 8th District: 16th and part of the 9th, 15th, 18th, 20th and 21st Ward of NYC
- 9th District: Part of the 18th, 19th and 21st Ward of NYC
- 10th District: Part of the 12th, 19th, 20th, 21st and 22nd Ward of NYC
- 11th District: 23rd and 24th, and part of the 12th, 20th and 22nd Ward of NYC
- 12th District: Rockland and Westchester counties
- 13th District: Orange and Sullivan counties
- 14th District: Greene, Schoharie and Ulster counties
- 15th District: Columbia, Dutchess and Putnam counties
- 16th District: Rensselaer and Washington counties
- 17th District: Albany County
- 18th District: Fulton, Hamilton, Montgomery, Saratoga and Schenectady counties
- 19th District: Clinton, Essex and Warren counties
- 20th District: Franklin, Lewis and St. Lawrence counties
- 21st District: Oswego and Jefferson counties
- 22nd District: Oneida County
- 23rd District: Herkimer, Madison and Otsego counties
- 24th District: Chenango, Delaware and Broome counties
- 25th District: Onondaga and Cortland counties
- 26th District: Cayuga, Seneca, Tompkins and Tioga counties
- 27th District: Allegany, Chemung and Steuben counties
- 28th District: Ontario, Schuyler, Wayne and Yates counties
- 29th District: Monroe and Orleans counties
- 30th District: Genesee, Livingston, Niagara and Wyoming counties
- 31st District: Erie County
- 32nd District: Cattaraugus and Chautauqua counties

Note: There are now 62 counties in the State of New York. The counties which are not mentioned in this list had not yet been established, or sufficiently organized, the area being included in one or more of the abovementioned counties.

=== Members ===
The asterisk (*) denotes members of the previous Legislature who continued in office as members of this Legislature.

District	Senator	Party	Notes
1st	James W. Covert*	Democrat	
2nd	John J. Kiernan*	Democrat	
3rd	Charles H. Russell*	Republican	
4th	John C. Jacobs*	Democrat	on January 11, elected president pro tempore
5th	John G. Boyd*	Democrat	
6th	Thomas F. Grady*	Democrat	
7th	James Daly*	Democrat	
8th	John W. Browning*	Democrat	
9th	James Fitzgerald*	Democrat	
10th	Joseph Koch*	Democrat	
11th	Frank P. Treanor*	Democrat	
12th	Henry C. Nelson*	Democrat	
13th	James Mackin*	Democrat	
14th	Addison P. Jones*	Democrat	
15th	Homer A. Nelson*	Democrat	
16th	Charles L. MacArthur*	Republican	
17th	Abraham Lansing*	Democrat	
18th	Alexander B. Baucus*	Democrat	
19th	Shepard P. Bowen*	Republican	
20th	Dolphus S. Lynde*	Republican	
21st	Frederick Lansing*	Republican	
22nd	Robert H. Roberts*	Democrat	
23rd	Alexander M. Holmes*	Republican	
24th	Edward B. Thomas*	Republican	
25th	Dennis McCarthy*	Republican	
26th	David H. Evans*	Republican	
27th	Sumner Baldwin*	Republican	
28th	George P. Lord*	Republican	
29th	Edmund L. Pitts*	Republican	
30th	Timothy E. Ellsworth*	Republican	
31st	Robert C. Titus*	Democrat	
32nd	Norman M. Allen*	Republican	

=== Employees ===
- Clerk: John W. Vrooman
- Sergeant-at-Arms: John W. Corning
- Doorkeeper: Charles F. Brady
- Stenographer: Hudson C. Tanner

== State Assembly ==
=== Assemblymen ===
The asterisk (*) denotes members of the previous Legislature who continued as members of this Legislature.

District		Assemblymen	Party	Notes
Albany	1st	Daniel P. Winne	Democrat	
Albany	2nd	Warren S. Kelley	Democrat	
Albany	3rd	Edward A. Maher	Democrat	
Albany	4th	Joseph Delahanty	Dem./Labor Reform	
Allegany		Charles S. Hall	Republican	
Broome		Lewis Chester Bartlett	Democrat	
Cattaraugus	1st	Charles S. Cary	Democrat	
Cattaraugus	2nd	Elijah R. Schoonmaker*	Republican	
Cayuga	1st	Josiah H. Hamilton	Democrat	
Cayuga	2nd	William Howland	Republican	
Chautauqua	1st	Charles H. Corbett	Democrat	
Chautauqua	2nd	Oscar F. Price	Republican	
Chemung		Jeremiah J. O'Connor	Democrat	
Chenango		Silas W. Berry*	Republican	
Clinton		Benjamin D. Clapp*	Republican	
Columbia		Abram L. Schermerhorn*	Democrat	
Cortland		Judson C. Nelson	Democrat	
Delaware		Timothy Sanderson	Republican	
Dutchess	1st	Storm Emans	Democrat	
Dutchess	2nd	Edgar A. Briggs	Republican	
Erie	1st	Cornelius Donohue	Democrat	
Erie	2nd	Godfrey Ernst	Labor Reform/Rep.	
Erie	3rd	Elias S. Hawley	Republican	
Erie	4th	Timothy W. Jackson*	Democrat	
Erie	5th	David J. Wilcox	Democrat	
Essex		Nathaniel C. Boynton	Republican	
Franklin		William T. O'Neil*	Republican	
Fulton and Hamilton		Richard Murray	Democrat	
Genesee		Robert W. Nichol	Democrat	
Greene		Frank S. Decker	Democrat	
Herkimer		George W. Smith	Democrat	
Jefferson	1st	Isaac L. Hunt Jr.*	Republican	
Jefferson	2nd	William M. Thomson	Democrat	
Kings	1st	Michael E. Butler	Democrat	
Kings	2nd	Bernard J. Mulholland	Republican	
Kings	3rd	Charles J. Henry	Democrat	
Kings	4th	Patrick Burns	Democrat	
Kings	5th	Thomas J. Sheridan*	Ind. Dem.	unsuccessfully contested by Michael J. Coffey (D) and
Kings	6th	Patrick H. McCarren*	Democrat	
Kings	7th	George H. Lindsay*	Democrat	
Kings	8th	David Lindsay	Republican	unsuccessfully contested by Robert E. Connelly (D) and
Kings	9th	Alfred Hodges	Republican	
Kings	10th	James Taylor	Republican	
Kings	11th	Alfred C. Chapin*	Democrat	elected Speaker; on November 6, 1883, elected New York State Comptroller
Kings	12th	Mortimer C. Earl	Democrat	
Lewis		Friend Hoyt	Democrat	
Livingston		Kidder M. Scott*	Republican	
Madison		George H. Benjamin	Republican	
Monroe	1st	Levi J. DeLand	Democrat	
Monroe	2nd	David Healy	Labor Reform/Dem.	
Monroe	3rd	Alexander P. Butts*	Democrat	
Montgomery		James R. Snell	Democrat	
New York	1st	Michael C. Murphy*	Irving Hall Dem.	
New York	2nd	Thomas Maher*	Tammany Dem.	
New York	3rd	Patrick N. Oakley	Tammany Dem.	
New York	4th	Patrick H. Roche	Irving Hall Dem.	
New York	5th	Dominick F. Mullaney	Tammany Dem.	
New York	6th	Timothy J. Campbell	County/Irv. H. Dem.	
New York	7th	Lucas L. Van Allen*	Republican	
New York	8th	George H. Werfelman	Republican	
New York	9th	Frederick B. House	Republican	
New York	10th	George F. Roesch	County/Tam. Dem.	
New York	11th	Walter Howe	Republican	
New York	12th	Emanuel A. Schwarz	Tammany Dem.	
New York	13th	Thales S. Bliss	County/Tam. Dem.	unsuccessfully contested by Henry L. Sprague (R) and
New York	14th	John Murphy	County/Tam. Dem.	
New York	15th	James F. Higgins	Democrat	
New York	16th	Francis B. Spinola	Democrat	
New York	17th	John Quinn	County/Tam. Dem.	
New York	18th	Daniel S. McElroy	County Dem.	
New York	19th	John McManus*	Tam./Irv. Hall Dem.	
New York	20th	James Haggerty*	Democrat	
New York	21st	Theodore Roosevelt*	Republican	Minority Leader
New York	22nd	Jacob F. Miller	County/Tam. Dem.	
New York	23rd	Leroy Bowers Crane*	Republican	
New York	24th	John J. Clarke	Tammany Dem.	
Niagara	1st	Joseph W. Higgins*	Democrat	
Niagara	2nd	Thomas Vincent Welch*	Democrat	
Oneida	1st	William Townsend	Democrat	
Oneida	2nd	Clarence E. Williams	Democrat	
Oneida	3rd	Thomas B. Allanson	Democrat	
Onondaga	1st	James Geddes	Republican	
Onondaga	2nd	Elbert O. Farrar*	Republican	
Onondaga	3rd	John Lighton*	Democrat	
Ontario		Frank Rice	Democrat	Chairman of Privileges and Elections
Orange	1st	J. Chauncey Odell	Democrat	
Orange	2nd	Jacob H. Dimmick	Democrat	
Orleans		Henry M. Hard*	Republican	
Oswego	1st	William A. Poucher*	Democrat	
Oswego	2nd	Byron Helm*	Republican	
Otsego	1st	William Caryl Ely	Democrat	Chairman of Petitions of Aliens
Otsego	2nd	Hartford D. Nelson	Democrat	
Putnam		James Wilton Brooks	Republican	
Queens	1st	Louis K. Church	Democrat	
Queens	2nd	George E. Bulmer	Democrat	
Rensselaer	1st	William V. Cleary	Democrat	
Rensselaer	2nd	Richard A. Derrick*	Republican	unsuccessfully contested by Isaac L. Van Vorst and
Rensselaer	3rd	Rufus Sweet*	Democrat	
Richmond		Erastus Brooks*	Democrat	
Rockland		William H. Thompson	Democrat	
St. Lawrence	1st	Abel Godard*	Republican	
St. Lawrence	2nd	Morell D. Beckwith	Republican	
St. Lawrence	3rd	George Z. Erwin*	Republican	
Saratoga	1st	William B. Consalus	Republican	
Saratoga	2nd	Henry S. Clement	Ind. Rep.	
Schenectady		Christopher O. Hamlin	Republican	
Schoharie		Hadley Snyder	Democrat	
Schuyler		Adrian Tuttle	Democrat	
Seneca		Patrick J. Rogers	Democrat	
Steuben	1st	Orange S. Searl*	Democrat	
Steuben	2nd	Andrew B. Craig	Democrat	
Suffolk		Edwin Bailey	Democrat	
Sullivan		George B. Childs	Democrat	
Tioga		Myron B. Ferris	Democrat	
Tompkins		John E. Cady	Democrat	
Ulster	1st	Thomas H. Tremper	Republican	
Ulster	2nd	David M. De Witt	Democrat	
Ulster	3rd	Thomas E. Benedict*	Democrat	
Warren		Lorenzo R. Locke	Republican	
Washington	1st	Robert Armstrong Jr.*	Republican	
Washington	2nd	George Northup*	Democrat	
Wayne	1st	Oscar Weed*	Republican	
Wayne	2nd	Leman Hotchkiss	Democrat	unsuccessfully contested by William E. Greenwood (R);
Westchester	1st	Edwin R. Keyes*	Democrat	
Westchester	2nd	Samuel W. Johnson	Democrat	
Westchester	3rd	John Hoag	Democrat	
Wyoming		Henry N. Page*	Republican	
Yates		Stafford C. Cleveland	Republican	

=== Employees ===
- Clerk: Walter H. Bunn
- Sergeant-at-Arms: James H. Delaney
- Doorkeeper: Jabez C. Pierce
- First Assistant Doorkeeper: Edward Hinch
- Second Assistant Doorkeeper: Edward Brodie
- Stenographer: Spencer C. Rogers

== Sources ==
- Civil List and Constitutional History of the Colony and State of New York compiled by Edgar Albert Werner (1884; see pg. 276 for Senate districts; pg. 291 for senators; pg. 298–304 for Assembly districts; and pg. 381f for assemblymen)
- Sketches of the Members of the Legislatures in The Evening Journal Almanac (1883)
- THE NEXT ASSEMBLY in NYT on November 9, 1882
- CHAPIN FOR SPEAKER in NYT on January 2, 1883
