= James Haggerty (New York politician) =

American politician

James Haggerty (December 21, 1834 – December 21, 1887) was an Irish-American lawyer and politician from New York.

== Life ==
Haggerty was born on December 21, 1834, in Glasgow, Scotland, the son of Irish parents. After he immigrated to America, he studied law and worked as a lawyer.

Haggerty enrolled in the 111th New York Volunteer Infantry Regiment in February 1863 and was mustered in as a first lieutenant and adjutant. He was discharged for disability in June. In 1869, President Grant appointed him U.S. Consul at Glasgow, but when he arrived the British refused him due to his connections with Irish nationalist movements. He was shortly afterwards appointed Deputy Naval Officer of the Port of New York. He resigned from the office in 1872. A Republican until that point, he then joined the Liberal Republican Party and, when that party failed, he became a Democrat.

In 1881, Haggerty was elected to the New York State Assembly as a Democrat, representing the New York County 20th District. He served in the Assembly in 1882, 1883, 1884, 1885, and 1886.

Haggerty was married, but had no children. He was a member of the Grand Army of the Republic and the Irish National League.

Haggerty died at home from pneumonia on December 21, 1887, his 53rd birthday. He was buried in Green-Wood Cemetery.

New York State Assembly
Preceded by Frederick Thilemann, Jr.	New York State Assembly; New York County, 20th District; 1882-1886	Succeeded by William H. Hornidge
