= George H. Lindsay =

American politician

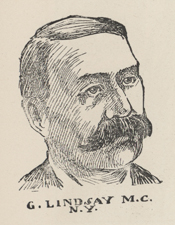

Member of the U.S. House of Representatives from New York
- In office March 4, 1901 – March 3, 1913
- Preceded by: Mitchell May
- Succeeded by: Denis O'Leary
- Constituency: 6th district (1901–1903); 2nd district (1903–1913)

Member of the New York State Assembly from Kings County's 7th district
- In office January 1, 1882 – December 31, 1886
- Preceded by: John Reitz
- Succeeded by: John Reitz

Personal details
- Born: January 7, 1837 Manhattan, New York, U.S.
- Died: May 25, 1916 (aged 79) Brooklyn, New York, U.S.
- Party: Democratic

George Henry Lindsay (January 7, 1837 – May 25, 1916) was an American businessman and politician who served six terms as a United States representative from New York from 1901 to 1913. He was the coroner of Kings County, New York, from 1886 to 1892.

== Life ==
He was born in Manhattan on January 7, 1837. He moved with his parents to Brooklyn in 1843. He attended the public schools and engaged in the real estate and investment business.

=== Political career ===
He was a member of the New York State Assembly (Kings Co., 7th D.) in 1882, 1883, 1884, 1885 and 1886; and was Coroner of Kings County, New York, from 1886 to 1892. He was appointed assistant tax commissioner in 1898 and was a delegate to various national and State conventions.

==== Congress ====
Lindsay was elected as a Democrat to the Fifty-seventh and to the five succeeding Congresses, holding office from March 4, 1901, to March 3, 1913. He declined to be a candidate for renomination in 1912 and lived in retirement until his death in Brooklyn in 1916. Interment was in Cemetery of the Evergreens, Brooklyn.

== Legacy ==
George H. Lindsay's son, George Washington Lindsay, was also a U.S. Representative from New York. P.S. 250 George H. Lindsay is named after him, as was what is now Sternberg Park from 1925 to 1990.

New York State Assembly
Preceded by John Reitz	New York State Assembly; Kings County, 7th District; 1882-1886	Succeeded by John Reitz
U.S. House of Representatives
Preceded by Mitchell May	Member of the U.S. House of Representatives from New York's 6th congressional district 1901–1903	Succeeded by Robert Baker
Preceded by John J. Fitzgerald	Member of the U.S. House of Representatives from New York's 2nd congressional district 1903–1913	Succeeded by Denis O'Leary
