= Patrick J. Rogers =

Irish-American lawyer and politician (1844–1897)

Patrick J. Rogers (March 4, 1844 – June 21, 1897) was an Irish-American lawyer and politician from New York.

== Life ==
Rogers was born on March 4, 1844, in Castlebar, Ireland. His father, also Patrick J. Rogers, was a Castlebar businessman, an active supporter of Daniel O'Connell, and a prominent member of Conciliation Hall from its establishment to its dissolution.

In 1861, Rogers went to America and settled in Seneca Falls, New York. In September 1864, during the American Civil War, he enlisted and was mustered into Company I, 15th New York Engineer Regiment, as a private. In January 1865, he was promoted to corporal. In June 1865, he was mustered out with his company. In June 1872, he organized Company K, 49th Regiment, National Guard of the State of New York, and was elected captain of the company. He initially worked as a mechanic, but in 1870 he was admitted to the bar and began working as a lawyer. He studied law under Gilbert Wilcoxen. A Democrat, he served as Treasurer of Seneca Falls in 1871, District Attorney of Seneca County from 1872 to 1874 and from 1878 to 1880, and Justice of the Peace in 1881. In 1882, he was elected to the New York State Assembly as a Democrat, representing Seneca County. He served in the Assembly in 1883.

In October 1886, during the first Grover Cleveland administration, Assistant Secretary of the Interior Hawkins announced Roger's appointment to the Board of Pension Appeals. He was reappointed to the Board by the Secretary of the Interior in June 1887. He left the Board in July 1888, when Congress failed to pass a legislative appropriation bill for the fiscal year before his term expired. He was instead appointed a law clerk in the Assistant Attorney-General's Office for the Interior Department. During Benjamin Harrison's presidency, he worked for a leading law firm in Washington, D.C. In October 1893, President Cleveland reappointed him to the Commission of Pension Appeals. In November 1896, he resigned from his position due to poor health. Secretary David R. Francis had him transferred to the pension department, assigned a special agent for Southern California, and sent to Los Angeles, California.

Rogers was first married to a daughter of Jeremiah Cronin, with whom he had a daughter. He later married Kate Hopkins, with whom he had two daughters and a son.

Rogers died at his home in Washington, D.C. from consumption on June 21, 1897. He was buried in Seneca Falls.

New York State Assembly
| Preceded by Albert M. Patterson | New York State Assembly; Seneca County; 1883 | Succeeded by George W. Jones |
