= Edward B. Thomas =

American judge

Edward Beers Thomas
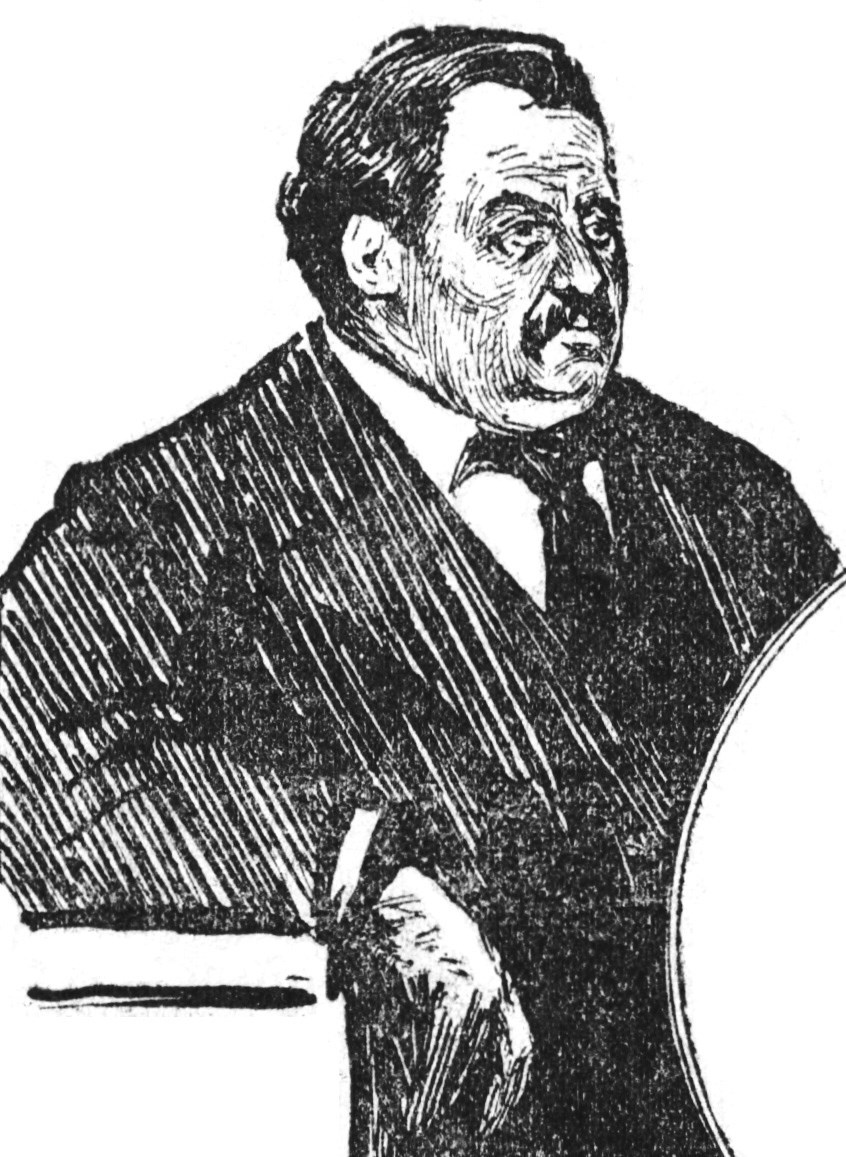
- Sketch of Thomas from New York Journal and Advertiser from January 11, 1899

Judge of the United States District Court for the Eastern District of New York
- In office February 15, 1898 – December 31, 1906
- Appointed by: William McKinley
- Preceded by: Asa Wentworth Tenney
- Succeeded by: Thomas Chatfield

Personal details
- Born: Edward Beers Thomas; August 4, 1848 Cortland, New York
- Died: March 27, 1929 (aged 80) Brooklyn, New York
- Party: Republican
- Education: Yale University (A.B.)

Edward Beers Thomas (August 4, 1848 – March 27, 1929) was a United States district judge of the United States District Court for the Eastern District of New York.

== Education and career ==
Born on August 4, 1848, in Cortland, New York, Thomas received an Artium Baccalaureus degree in 1870 from Yale University. He entered private practice in New York. He was a member of the New York State Senate from 1881 to 1885. He was elected from New York's 24th Senate District, sitting in the 105th, 106th, 107th and 108th New York State Legislatures. At the New York state election, 1885, he ran on the Republican ticket for New York Attorney General but was defeated by the incumbent Democrat Denis O'Brien.

== Federal judge ==
Thomas was nominated by President William McKinley on February 7, 1898, to a seat on the United States District Court for the Eastern District of New York vacated by Judge Asa Wentworth Tenney. He was confirmed by the United States Senate on February 15, 1898, and received his commission the same day.

In the federal trial of Ida Craddock for violating the Comstock Act due to her mailing a marriage pamphlet, Judge Thomas denied Craddock's defense the request to permit the jury to read the pamphlet. He declared it was "obscene, lewd, lascivious, dirty" and told the jury that the question was whether or not the defendant mailed the pamphlet to which she was found guilty. On the day of her sentencing, Craddock was found dead. Her suicide note condemned Judge Thomas for overseeing an unfair trial.

In 1905, Robert Barnswell Roosevelt, current president Theodore Roosevelt's uncle, wrote to his review to request a denial of Judge Thomas' requested promotion. President Roosevelt replied that "it would probably not be well to promote Judge Thomas."

Thomas was the judge in the trial of Captain William Van Schaick in 1906, after the PS General Slocum disaster, the worst maritime disaster of the 20th century until the sinking of the RMS Titanic and the worst maritime disaster in New York City history, and the deadliest manmade disaster of any sort in the New York area until the September 11 attacks in 2001. His service terminated on December 31, 1906, due to his resignation.

== Later career and death ==
Following his resignation from the federal bench, Thomas served as a Justice of the Supreme Court of New York for the Second Judicial District from 1907 to 1918. He died on March 27, 1929, in Brooklyn, New York.

== Sources ==
New York State Senate
Preceded by Edwin G. Halbert	New York State Senate 24th District; 1882–1885	Succeeded by Matthew W. Marvin
Legal offices
Preceded by Asa Wentworth Tenney	Judge of the United States District Court for the Eastern District of New York; 1898–1906	Succeeded by Thomas Chatfield
