= William Caryl Ely =

American politician (1856–1921)

Hon. William Caryl Ely
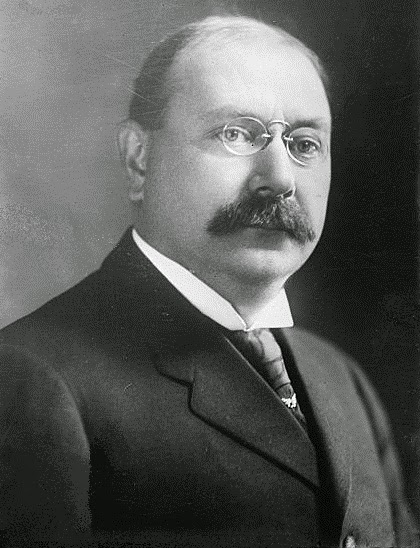

Member of the New York State Assembly from the 1st District of Otsego County
- In office January 1, 1883 – December 31, 1885
- Preceded by: J. Stanley Browne
- Succeeded by: Lowell S. Henry

Personal details
- Born: February 25, 1856 Middlefield, Otsego County, New York, U.S.
- Died: December 14, 1921 (aged 65) New York City, New York, U.S.
- Party: Democratic
- Spouse: Grace Keller (after 1884)
- Relations: Sumner Ely (grandfather)
- Education: Cornell University
- Profession: Politician, lawyer, businessman
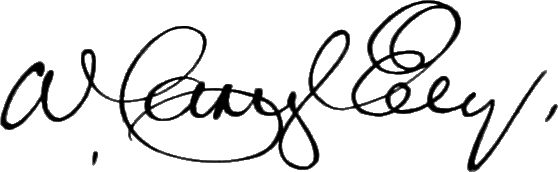
- Signature

William Caryl Ely (February 25, 1856 – December 14, 1921) was an American lawyer and politician from New York.

== Early life and education ==
W. Caryl Ely was born on February 25, 1856, in Middlefield, Otsego County, New York, the son of Assemblyman William H. Ely. Ely's grandfathers were New York State Senator Sumner Ely (1787–1857) and New York State Assemblyman Leonard Caryl; many of his lineal ancestors were soldiers in the American Revolution.

Ely attended schools in Otsego County, and later entered Cornell University in the Class of 1878. However, he did not graduate and left college in his junior year. Soon afterward he began the study of the law, was admitted to the bar, at Ithaca in 1882, and practiced in East Worcester, New York.

== Career ==
=== Political career ===
Ely started his political career in 1880 as the Clerk of the Board of Supervisors of Otsego County, where he served in 1880 and 1881. In 1882 and 1883, he was the Supervisor of the Town of Worcester. In 1883, he was elected as a member of the New York State Assembly (Otsego Co., 1st D.) serving in the 106th New York State Legislature, 107th New York State Legislature in 1884, and finally the 108th New York State Legislature in 1885. He was the Chairman of the Committee on the Petitions of Aliens in 1883, and Minority Leader in 1885.

In the 1890s he was Treasurer of the New York State Democratic Committee and served until September 12, 1896, when he resigned because he disagreed with the Free Silver platform adopted by the 1896 Democratic National Convention.

=== Legal career ===
After serving in the New York State Assembly, he moved to Niagara Falls, and in 1888, he formed a co-partnership with his former legal assistant, Frank A. Dudley, under the firm name of "Ely & Dudley." In 1893, Morris Cohn Jr. was admitted to partnership which then became "Ely, Dudley & Cohn." The firm was dissolved in 1899, upon Ely's election to the Presidency of the Buffalo Railway and allied companies.

During the first ten years of his legal career, Ely was a general practitioner, trying cases at circuit, acting as counsel, and arguing appeals. In 1886, he recovered the largest (at the time) verdict awarded in Niagara County in an action for damages for personal injuries.

=== Business career ===
Ely later moved to Buffalo, and engaged in the organization and construction of Western New York's most prominent railroads and power companies. He was one of the original promoters and incorporators of the Niagara Falls Power Company, and was instrumental in securing the enactment of its charter. He was the chief promoter of the Buffalo & Niagara Falls Electric Railway, and was its first president. He was also actively engaged in the construction of the Buffalo & Lockport Railway and Lockport & Olcott Railways, and was the president of both companies. For many years, Ely was the Counsel for the Niagara Falls and Clifton Suspension Bridge, and was counsel and one of the incorporators, and director of the company, which constructed the Suspension Bridge across the Niagara River between Lewiston, New York and Queenston, Ontario in Canada.

Ely was one of the founders and Trustees, of the "Niagara County Savings Bank" (which was acquired by Buffalo Savings Bank in 1981 and dissolved in 1991), and was a Director and Counsel of many banking and manufacturing corporations, including: the Niagara Falls Power Company, the Manufacturers' and Traders' National Bank of Buffalo, Carter-Crume Company(manufacturer of counter check books) the Niagara Silver Company and Wm A. Rogers, Ltd.

He was actively connected with almost all the large enterprises contributing to the building up of the cities Buffalo and Niagara Falls. He was heavily involved with the construction of approximately 60 mi (97 km) of irrigating canals in the Columbia River Valley, in the State of Washington. Ely was very interested in irrigation as an economic and social question and served as the vice-president for the State of New York of the National Irrigation Congress of the United States.

In 1898, Ely conceived a plan to combine all of the electric railways in Buffalo, Niagara Falls, Tonawanda, Lockport and vicinity, together with the Niagara Falls & River Railway, on the Canadian side of Niagara River, and the Steel Arch Bridge (at Niagara Falls), and Suspension Bridge (at Lewiston and Queenston), into one system. The plan was successfully carried out and all of the operating companies, with one exception, were consolidated into the International Railway Company, all the capital stock of which was owned and held by the International Traction Company, the holding company, both of which Ely was president. J.P. Morgan & Co. were the underwriters of the deal and the bankers for the International Traction Company. At the time, the company was associated with the leading figures in railroads, including Francis Lynde Stetson, Daniel S. Lamont, Victor Morawetz, Thomas DeWitt Cuyler, William B. Rankine, and others. The company owned and operated 352 mi (566 km) of urban and interurban electric railways as well as two bridges across the Niagara River

At the time of his death, he was associated with the Street Railway Advertising Company of New York, the American Sales Book Company, and the F.N. Burt Company.

== Personal life and death ==
In 1884, Ely married Grace Keller, of Cobleskill, New York, a daughter of one of the oldest and most distinguished Schoharie County, New York families. Together they had a daughter:

- Marion Caryl Ely (1887–1971), who in 1909 married Elbridge Gerry Spaulding (1881–1974), the grandson of Elbridge G. Spaulding (the former Treasurer of New York, Mayor of Buffalo, and member of the U.S. House of Representatives).

Ely was one of the original promoters, a director, chairman of Transportation Committee, and a member of the executive committee of the Pan-American Exposition. He was a Mason, member of the Sons of the American Revolution, Society of Colonial Wars, and other various clubs and organizations in Buffalo, Niagara Falls, and New York.

He died on December 14, 1921, at his home at 14 East 60th Street in Manhattan; and was buried at Forest Lawn Cemetery in Buffalo.

== See also ==
- Sumner Ely
- Frank A. Dudley
- International Railway (New York–Ontario)

New York State Assembly
Preceded by J. Stanley Browne	New York State Assembly; Otsego County, 1st District; 1883–1885	Succeeded by Lowell S. Henry
Political offices
Preceded by Frank Rice	Minority Leader in the New York State Assembly; 1885	Succeeded by William F. Sheehan
