= John W. Vrooman =

American lawyer, banker, and politician (1844–1929)

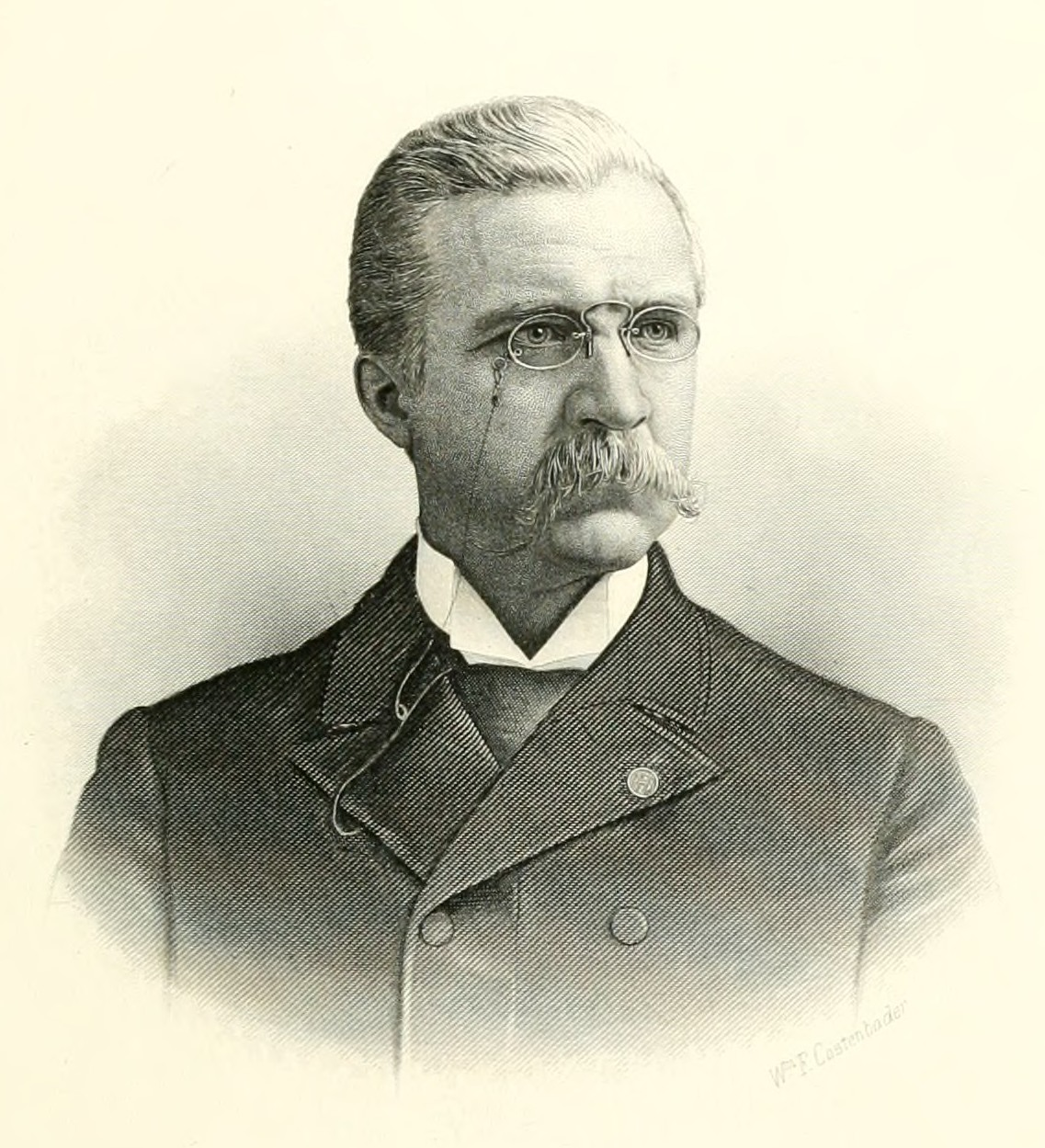
John W. Vrooman (1893)

John Wright Vrooman (March 28, 1844 – November 24, 1929) was an American lawyer, banker and politician from New York.

== Life ==
Vrooman was born on March 28, 1844, in German Flatts, Herkimer County, New York, to Nicholas Vrooman and Christina (Wright) Vrooman. He attended Little Falls Academy from 1857 to 1859, and then taught school in the countryside. Vrooman then studied law in the office of Judge Ezra Graves, but enlisted in the Union Navy during the American Civil War. After the war, he resumed the study of law and was admitted to the bar. From 1868 to 1876, he was Clerk of the Herkimer County Surrogate.

He was Deputy Clerk of the New York State Assembly in 1877. He was Clerk of the New York State Senate from 1878 to 1887, officiating in the 101st, 102nd, 103rd, 104th, 105th, 106th, 107th, 108th, 109th and 110th New York State Legislatures. Vrooman later returned to Herkimer and engaged in banking as vice president and general manager of the Herkimer Bank.

He was a member of the New York Republican State Committee from 1877 to 1884, and Secretary of the State Committee from 1880 to 1888. He was Grandmaster of the Grand Lodge of New York State from 1889 to 1890.

At the New York state election, 1891, he ran for Lieutenant Governor of New York on the Republican ticket with Jacob Sloat Fassett, but was defeated by Democrats Roswell P. Flower and William F. Sheehan.

He died on November 24, 1929, in Herkimer, New York.

== Sources ==
- COL. J.W. VROOMAN DIES AT AGE OF 86 in the New York Times on November 25, 1929 (subscription required)
- CAUCUS WORK AT ALBANY; THE MACHINE BEATEN IN THE SENATE in the New York Times on January 6, 1880
- THE CANDIDATES in the New York Times on September 10, 1891
