= James Arkell =

American businessman and politician (1829–1911)

New York State Senator 18th District
- In office 1884–1885
- President: Benjamin Harrison, Grover Cleveland
- Governor: Grover Cleveland, David B. Hill
- Preceded by: Alexander B. Baucus
- Succeeded by: Edward Wemple

Personal details
- Born: October 16, 1829 Oxford, England
- Died: February 28, 1911 (aged 81) New York
- Party: Republican
- Spouse: Sarah Hall Bartlett Arkell
- Parents: William Arkell (father); Mary Arkell (mother)
- Occupation: Businessperson, politician, investor, inventor
- Known for: Inventing mass production of the paper bag

James Arkell (October 16, 1829 – February 28, 1911) was an American politician who served as a Senator of New York from 1884 until 1885. He also operated a large paper bag manufacturing plant in Canajoharie, New York, and invented the machines used in the factories. He was granted thirty-two patents for the manufacturing of paper bags.

== Early life and education ==
James Arkell was born in Oxford, England on October 16, 1829, to William and Mary Arkell. The family later moved to Canajoharie, New York, to Arkell farm east of Canajoharie village, and Arkell was educated in the school and academy in the town.

== Career ==
=== Newspapers and factories ===
While working on the farm, he frequently contributed to the Canajoharie Radii newspaper, which Arkell and L. F. Allen then bought from Levi Backus in 1863. He was editor of the Canajoharie Radii until 1866, when he sold his interest in the Canajoharie Radii paper to Angell Mattewson. He also remained a writer in his later years, and contributed articles to Leslie's Weekly.

In 1859, he became interested in the manufacturing of flour bags, and that year he printed his first bags on a hand press in the Radii printing office. His father supported his bag business, Arkell & Smith, as the price of cotton cloth became expensive during the Civil War, and Arkell experimented until he had created a manila paper sack that was as durable as a cotton one. Deciding to focus entirely on paper bags because of the high price of cotton bags, he opened the plant of Arkell & Smiths and Canajoharie.

He was granted thirty-two patents for the manufacturing of paper bags. In 1873, the bag factory suffered an explosion, with a worker dying and the factory destroyed. Arkell's son William J. Arkell was also badly burned. A more modern factory was erected on the same site.

=== New York Senate ===
Arkell was active in public affairs and served in the New York Senate for one term as a Republican. He was elected senator for the eighteenth senatorial district in 1883.

As of 1885, he was serving as a New York senator and along with his son W. J. Arkell, then the proprietor of the Albany Evening Journal, were both supporting William M. Evarts to Senate. That year, The New York Times described the senior Arkell as "reported to be a regal entertainer. He is of English stock, one of the family traditions linking an ancestor with the Royal Plantagenets, and the hospitalities of his race have lost none of their generosity by lapse of time." He hosted a series of tea parties to rally support for Evarts' US senatorial bid.

=== After senatorship ===
As of 1886, James Arkell had a firm, Arkell & Smith.

Around 1879, Louis Paul Juvet partnered with James Arkell and businessman A.G. Richmond to mass-produce around 60 variations of his invented time globes, which were built at a Canajoharie factory. The factories burned in 1886, ending production of the object.

As of 1887, Arkell continued to be known as a paper bag manufacturer out of Canajoharie, and had been recently named as a principal stockholder of the Saratoga, Mount McGregor and Lake George Railroad. He also remained a chief proprietor of the Albany Evening Journal, a journal that had reportedly long supported Governor Hill. On March 2, 1887, Governor Hill named James Arkell to replace Railroad Commissioner John O'Donnell when the latter's term expired January 29, 1886. The New York Times called the nomination "scandalous" due to the governor's apparent enmity to O'Donnell, with the Times calling Arkell "a follower of the fortunes of the Platt-Morton syndicate," a collection of New York senators.

In September 1897, he was elected to the board of the National Paper Sack Company, along with ten other people.

== Personal life and family ==
Married on July 23, 1853, James and his wife Sarah Hall (Bartlett) Arkell had their first child, Bartlett Arkell, on June 10, 1862. Bartlett died in 1946. Their son William J. Arkell was head of the Arkell News Company, and the couple also had three daughters.

In March 1887, The New York Times reported that Arkell's daughter, Laura Arkell, had been disinherited by her father after she determined to marry John C. Ilse, a business superintendent from Canajoharie, against Arkell's objections. However, that month she came of age and she gained access to $20,000 bequeathed to her by her deceased uncle Leonard Carter, and was instead escorted by her other uncle John Forsberg for the marriage ceremonies.

James Arkell died on August 12, 1902, at the age of 72, in Canajoharie. His wife Sarah died on February 28, 1911.

== See also ==
- List of New York state senators
- Frank Barbour

New York State Senate
| Preceded by Alexander B. Baucus | New York State Senate; 18th District; 1884–1885 | Succeeded by Edward Wemple |
