= George Z. Erwin =

American politician

George Zalmon Erwin
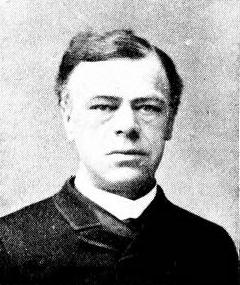

Member of the New York State Senate
- In office 1888–1893

Member of the New York State Assembly
- In office 1882–1887

Personal details
- Born: January 15, 1840 Madrid, New York, US
- Died: January 16, 1894 (aged 54) Potsdam, New York, US
- Party: Republican
- Spouse: Caroline C. Dart (m. 1868)
- Education: Middlebury College (1865)
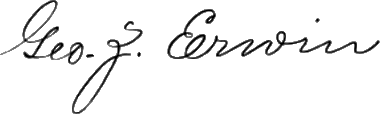
- Signature

George Zalmon Erwin (January 15, 1840 – January 16, 1894) was an American politician.

== Life ==
He was born on January 15, 1840, in Madrid, St. Lawrence County, New York.

He was educated at Saint Lawrence Academy at Potsdam, New York. He graduated from Middlebury College in August 1865. He studied law with the then United States Attorney for the Northern District of New York William A. Dart and Charles O. Tappan, and was admitted to the bar in 1867. He commenced practice in Potsdam, N.Y., and entered into partnership with Samuel B. Gordon in 1868. The same year he married Dart's daughter Caroline (b. 1842), but they had no children. A year later, he succeeded his father-in-law as partner in the law firm of Dart & Tappan, and practiced for ten years under the firm name of Tappan & Erwin. In 1878, Tappan was elected to the New York Supreme Court, and William A. Dart returned to Potsdam, N.Y., and resumed practice in partnership with Erwin under the name of Dart & Erwin.

Erwin was a member of the New York State Assembly (St. Lawrence Co., 3rd D.) in 1882, 1883, 1884, 1885, 1886 and 1887. In 1884, allied with Thomas C. Platt, he was a strong candidate for Speaker, but was defeated by Titus Sheard, the candidate of the Warner Miller faction. The following year, the Platt faction was victorious, and Erwin was elected Speaker.

He was a member of the New York State Senate (20th D.) from 1888 to 1893, sitting in the 111th, 112th, 113th, 114th, 115th and 116th New York State Legislature. In 1892–1893 he was the Republican minority leader of the State Senate. To him is due the credit of organizing the dairy department for suppressing the sale and manufacture of oleomargarine. He secured the enactment of the bill preventing the sale of liquor in quantities of five gallons or more in towns having no license. In 1891, he was Chairman of the Committee on General Laws and made interesting investigations into the subject of electricity for lighting and power.

In the session of 1892, when Republican leader, he made a strong but unsuccessful fight against the re-apportionment of the state, and for his refusal to vote on an enumeration bill he and two other senators were declared guilty of contempt by Lt. Gov. William F. Sheehan and their names taken from the roll. But they were supported by the judiciary committee in their position, were purged of contempt and their names restored.

He was interested in various local industries. He was one of the proprietors and organizers of the Thatcher Manufacturing Company, and up to the time of his death was its vice-president. He helped to organize the High Falls Sulphite Pulp and Mining Co., and was its president.

He died on January 16, 1894, in Potsdam, New York at age 54.

== See also ==
- List of New York Legislature members expelled or censured

New York State Assembly
Preceded by Ebenezer S. Crapser	New York State Assembly; St. Lawrence County, 3rd District; 1882–1887	Succeeded by Michael H. Flaherty
Political offices
Preceded by Titus Sheard	Speaker of the New York State Assembly; 1885	Succeeded by James W. Husted
New York State Senate
Preceded by Charles L. Knapp	New York State Senate; 20th District; 1888–1893	Succeeded by Harvey J. Donaldson
