= Andrew Davidson (soldier) =

American politician

- Born: February 12, 1840; Morebattle, Scotland
- Died: November 10, 1902 (aged 62); Bath, New York
- Burial place: Lakewood Cemetery
- Military career
- Allegiance: United States of America
- Branch: United States Army
- Service years: 1862–1865
- Rank: Captain
- Units: 121st New York Infantry; 30th United States Colored Infantry Regiment Company H
- Conflicts: American Civil War: Battle of the Crater
- Awards: Medal of Honor

Andrew Davidson (February 12, 1840 – November 10, 1902) was a Scottish soldier who fought in the American Civil War. Davidson received the United States' highest award for bravery during combat, the Medal of Honor, for his action during the Battle of the Crater in Petersburg, Virginia, on July 30, 1864. He was honored with the award on 17 October 1892.

== Biography ==
Davidson was born in Morebattle, Scotland, on February 12, 1840. He enlisted with the 121st New York Infantry on August 23, 1862. He was promoted to regimental Sergeant Major. He was transferred to the 30th U.S. Colored Troops on March 18, 1864, where he was promoted to first lieutenant and later regimental adjutant on May 1, 1864. It was in this capacity that he performed the act of gallantry on July 30, 1864, that later earned him the Medal of Honor. By December 10, 1865, when Davidson was mustered out of the service, he had been promoted to captain and commander of Company B within his regiment.

After the war, he was editor for a local newspaper, the Otsego Republican. He was a companion of the New York Commandery of the Military Order of the Loyal Legion of the United States. He also served as a member of the New York State Senate from 1884 to 1885. He died on November 10, 1902 and his remains are interred at the Lakewood Cemetery in New York.

== Medal of Honor citation ==
One of the first to enter the enemy's works, where, after his colonel, major, and one-third the company officers had fallen, he gallantly assisted in rallying and saving the remnant of the command.

== See also ==
- List of American Civil War Medal of Honor recipients: A–F
