= 112th New York State Legislature =

New York state legislative session

←	111th	113th	→
- New York State Capitol (2009)

Overview
- Legislative body: New York State Legislature
- Jurisdiction: New York, United States
- Term: January 1 – December 31, 1889

Senate
- Members: 32
- President: Lt. Gov. Edward F. Jones (D)
- Temporary President: Jacob Sloat Fassett (R)
- Party control: Republican (20-12)

Assembly
- Members: 128
- Speaker: Fremont Cole (R)
- Party control: Republican (79-49)

Sessions
- 1st: January 1 – May 16, 1889

The 112th New York State Legislature, consisting of the New York State Senate and the New York State Assembly, met from January 1 to May 16, 1889, during the fifth year of David B. Hill's governorship, in Albany.

== Background ==
Under the provisions of the New York Constitution of 1846, 32 Senators and 128 assemblymen were elected in single-seat districts; senators for a two-year term, assemblymen for a one-year term. The senatorial districts were made up of entire counties, except New York County (seven districts) and Kings County (three districts). The Assembly districts were made up of entire towns, or city wards, forming a contiguous area, all within the same county.

At this time there were two major political parties: the Democratic Party and the Republican Party. The "United Labor" organization endorsed the Republican nominee for governor Warner Miller, but nominated own candidates for the other offices. The Prohibition Party and the Socialist Labor Party also nominated state tickets.

== Elections ==
The 1888 New York state election was held on November 6. Gov. David B. Hill and Lt. Gov. Edward F. Jones (both Dem.) were re-elected. The only other statewide elective office up for election was also carried by a Democrat. The approximate party strength at this election, as expressed by the vote for governor, was: Democrats 650,000; Republicans/United Labor 631,000; Prohibition 30,000; and Socialist Labor 3,500.

== Sessions ==
The Legislature met for the regular session at the State Capitol in Albany on January 1, 1889; and adjourned on May 16.

Fremont Cole (R) was re-elected Speaker with 76 votes against 47 for William F. Sheehan (D).

Jacob Sloat Fassett (R) was elected president pro tempore of the State Senate.

On January 18, a grand jury in Albany refused to indict Assemblyman Charles Smith for perjury. The New York City Reform Club had accused Smith of having obtained his election by buying votes.

== State Senate ==
=== Districts ===
- 1st District: Queens and Suffolk counties
- 2nd District: 1st, 2nd, 5th, 6th, 8th, 9th, 10th, 12th and 22nd Ward of the City of Brooklyn, and the towns of Flatbush, Gravesend and New Utrecht in Kings County
- 3rd District: 3rd, 4th, 7th, 11th, 13th, 19th, 20th, 21st and 23rd Ward of the City of Brooklyn
- 4th District: 14th, 15th, 16th, 17th, 18th, 24th and 25th Ward of the City of Brooklyn, and the towns of New Lots and Flatlands in Kings County
- 5th District: Richmond County and the 1st, 2nd, 3rd, 5th, 6th, 8th, 14th and parts of the 4th and 9th Ward of New York City
- 6th District: 7th, 11th, 13th and part of the 4th Ward of NYC
- 7th District: 10th, 17th and part of the 15th, 18th and 21st Ward of NYC
- 8th District: 16th and part of the 9th, 15th, 18th, 20th and 21st Ward of NYC
- 9th District: Part of the 18th, 19th and 21st Ward of NYC
- 10th District: Part of the 12th, 19th, 20th, 21st and 22nd Ward of NYC
- 11th District: 23rd and 24th, and part of the 12th, 20th and 22nd Ward of NYC
- 12th District: Rockland and Westchester counties
- 13th District: Orange and Sullivan counties
- 14th District: Greene, Schoharie and Ulster counties
- 15th District: Columbia, Dutchess and Putnam counties
- 16th District: Rensselaer and Washington counties
- 17th District: Albany County
- 18th District: Fulton, Hamilton, Montgomery, Saratoga and Schenectady counties
- 19th District: Clinton, Essex and Warren counties
- 20th District: Franklin, Lewis and St. Lawrence counties
- 21st District: Oswego and Jefferson counties
- 22nd District: Oneida County
- 23rd District: Herkimer, Madison and Otsego counties
- 24th District: Chenango, Delaware and Broome counties
- 25th District: Onondaga and Cortland counties
- 26th District: Cayuga, Seneca, Tompkins and Tioga counties
- 27th District: Allegany, Chemung and Steuben counties
- 28th District: Ontario, Schuyler, Wayne and Yates counties
- 29th District: Monroe and Orleans counties
- 30th District: Genesee, Livingston, Niagara and Wyoming counties
- 31st District: Erie County
- 32nd District: Cattaraugus and Chautauqua counties

Note: There are now 62 counties in the State of New York. The counties which are not mentioned in this list had not yet been established, or sufficiently organized, the area being included in one or more of the abovementioned counties.

=== Members ===
The asterisk (*) denotes members of the previous Legislature who continued in office as members of this Legislature.

District	Senator	Party	Notes
1st	Simeon S. Hawkins*	Republican	
2nd	James F. Pierce*	Democrat	
3rd	Eugene F. O'Connor*	Republican	
4th	Jacob Worth*	Republican	
5th	Michael C. Murphy*	Democrat	
6th	Thomas F. Grady	Democrat	elected on December 28, 1888, to fill vacancy, in place of Edward F. Reilly
7th	George F. Langbein*	Democrat	
8th	Cornelius Van Cott*	Republican	seat vacated on May 1, upon taking office as Postmaster of New York City
9th	Charles A. Stadler*	Democrat	
10th	Jacob A. Cantor*	Democrat	Minority Leader
11th	Eugene S. Ives*	Democrat	
12th	William H. Robertson*	Republican	
13th	vacant		Henry R. Low (R) died on December 1, 1888
13th	Peter Ward	Democrat	elected on January 29, 1889, to fill vacancy
14th	John J. Linson*	Democrat	
15th	Gilbert A. Deane*	Republican	
16th	Michael F. Collins*	Democrat	
17th	Henry Russell*	Republican	
18th	John Foley*	Democrat	
19th	Rowland C. Kellogg*	Republican	
20th	George Z. Erwin*	Republican	
21st	George B. Sloan*	Republican	
22nd	Henry J. Coggeshall*	Republican	
23rd	Frank B. Arnold*	Republican	
24th	William Lewis*	Republican	
25th	Francis Hendricks*	Republican	
26th	William L. Sweet*	Republican	
27th	J. Sloat Fassett*	Republican	elected President pro tempore
28th	John Raines*	Republican	
29th	Donald McNaughton*	Democrat	
30th	Edward C. Walker*	Republican	
31st	John Laughlin*	Republican	
32nd	Commodore P. Vedder*	Republican	

=== Employees ===
- Clerk: John S. Kenyon
- Sergeant-at-Arms: John W. Corning
- Doorkeeper: Charles V. Schram
- Assistant Doorkeeper: Hiram Van Tassel
- Stenographer: Harris A. Corell

== State Assembly ==
=== Assemblymen ===
The asterisk (*) denotes members of the previous Legislature who continued as members of this Legislature.

District		Assemblymen	Party	Notes
Albany	1st	Jervis L. Miller	Democrat	
Albany	2nd	Vreeland H. Youngman*	Republican	
Albany	3rd	Galen R. Hitt	Democrat	
Albany	4th	William Burton LeRoy	Republican	
Allegany		Albert B. Cottrell*	Republican	
Broome		Alonzo D. Lewis*	Republican	
Cattaraugus	1st	George N. West	Republican	
Cattaraugus	2nd	James S. Whipple*	Republican	
Cayuga	1st	John E. Savery*	Republican	
Cayuga	2nd	Leander Fitts	Republican	
Chautauqua	1st	S. Frederick Nixon*	Republican	
Chautauqua	2nd	George E. Towne	Republican	
Chemung		Robert P. Bush*	Democrat	
Chenango		Edgar A. Pearsall	Republican	
Clinton		Stephen Moffitt	Republican	
Columbia		William Dinehart*	Republican	
Cortland		Rufus T. Peck	Republican	
Delaware		George O. Mead	Republican	
Dutchess	1st	Willard H. Mase*	Republican	
Dutchess	2nd	Johnston de Peyster	Republican	
Erie	1st	William F. Sheehan*	Democrat	Minority Leader
Erie	2nd	Matthias Endres*	Democrat	
Erie	3rd	Leroy Andrus	Republican	
Erie	4th	Henry H. Guenther*	Democrat	
Erie	5th	Amos H. Baker	Republican	
Essex		Thomas J. Treadway	Republican	
Franklin		William C. Stevens	Republican	
Fulton and Hamilton		Lewis Brownell*	Republican	
Genesee		John M. McKenzie*	Republican	
Greene		Francis G. Walters	Republican	
Herkimer		DeWitt J. Mesick	Republican	
Jefferson	1st	Henry J. Lane	Republican	
Jefferson	2nd	Andrew C. Comstock*	Republican	
Kings	1st	Robert H. Miley	Democrat	
Kings	2nd	William H. McLaughlin*	Democrat	
Kings	3rd	Peter K. McCann*	Democrat	
Kings	4th	Henry F. Haggerty*	Democrat	
Kings	5th	John Kelly	Democrat	
Kings	6th	Patrick H. McCarren	Democrat	
Kings	7th	Adam Schaaff	Democrat	
Kings	8th	William Blanchfield	Democrat	
Kings	9th	Frank Sperry	Republican	
Kings	10th	John B. Longley*	Democrat	
Kings	11th	Joseph Aspinall*	Republican	
Kings	12th	James P. Graham	Democrat	
Lewis		Hugh Hughes*	Republican	
Livingston		Jotham Clark*	Republican	
Madison		Charles E. Maynard*	Republican	
Monroe	1st	Judson F. Sheldon	Republican	
Monroe	2nd	Joseph Bauer	Republican	
Monroe	3rd	Edwin A. Loder	Republican	
Montgomery		W. Barlow Dunlap	Republican	
New York	1st	Patrick H. Duffy	Democrat	
New York	2nd	Timothy D. Sullivan*	Democrat	
New York	3rd	Thomas Smith Jr.*	Democrat	
New York	4th	Jeremiah Hayes*	Democrat	
New York	5th	Dominick F. Mullaney	Democrat	
New York	6th	Charles P. Blake	Democrat	
New York	7th	Francis V. King	Republican	
New York	8th	Charles Smith	Republican	
New York	9th	John Martin*	Democrat	
New York	10th	George F. Roesch*	Democrat	
New York	11th	Robert Ray Hamilton*	Republican	
New York	12th	Moses Dinkelspiel	Democrat	
New York	13th	Frederick S. Gibbs	Republican	
New York	14th	Thomas J. Creamer	Democrat	
New York	15th	Frederick Haffner	Democrat	
New York	16th	Edward P. Hagan*	Democrat	
New York	17th	John Kerrigan	Democrat	
New York	18th	William H. Newschafer	Democrat	
New York	19th	John Connelly*	Democrat	
New York	20th	William H. Hornidge*	Democrat	
New York	21st	Ernest H. Crosby*	Republican	
New York	22nd	Joseph Blumenthal*	Democrat	
New York	23rd	Augustus Strassburg	Democrat	
New York	24th	Christopher C. Clarke	Democrat	
Niagara	1st	John F. Little	Republican	
Niagara	2nd	J. Marville Harwood	Democrat	
Oneida	1st	Joseph Harry Kent*	Democrat	
Oneida	2nd	George G. McAdam*	Republican	
Oneida	3rd	Abisha B. Baker	Republican	
Onondaga	1st	James W. Upson	Republican	
Onondaga	2nd	William H. Gallup*	Republican	
Onondaga	3rd	Walter W. Cheney*	Republican	
Ontario		Robert Moody*	Republican	
Orange	1st	John C. Adams*	Republican	
Orange	2nd	George W. Greene*	Democrat	
Orleans		Ira Edwards*	Republican	
Oswego	1st	S. Mortimer Coon*	Republican	
Oswego	2nd	Danforth E. Ainsworth*	Republican	
Otsego	1st	William E. Dante	Republican	
Otsego	2nd	Walter L. Brown*	Republican	
Putnam		Hamilton Fish II	Republican	
Queens	1st	Solomon S. Townsend	Democrat	
Queens	2nd	Philip T. Cronin	Democrat	
Rensselaer	1st	George O'Neil*	Democrat	
Rensselaer	2nd	Joseph S. Saunders	Republican	
Rensselaer	3rd	James Ryan Jr.*	Democrat	
Richmond		Hubbard R. Yetman	Democrat	
Rockland		Frank P. Demarest*	Democrat	
St. Lawrence	1st	N. Martin Curtis*	Republican	
St. Lawrence	2nd	William H. Kimball*	Republican	
St. Lawrence	3rd	Michael H. Flaherty*	Republican	
Saratoga	1st	Harvey J. Donaldson*	Republican	
Saratoga	2nd	George S. Batcheller	Republican	seat vacated on April 1, upon appointment as Assistant U.S. Secretary of the Treasury
Schenectady		Austin A. Yates*	Republican	
Schoharie		J. Edward Young	Democrat	
Schuyler		Fremont Cole*	Republican	re-elected Speaker
Seneca		William Harrison Dunham	Democrat	
Steuben	1st	Charles H. McMaster	Republican	
Steuben	2nd	Milo M. Acker*	Republican	
Suffolk		Henry E. Huntting*	Republican	
Sullivan		Martin A. Smith*	Republican	
Tioga		Abram I. Decker	Republican	
Tompkins		Frank J. Enz*	Republican	
Ulster	1st	George A. Davidson	Republican	
Ulster	2nd	Jacob Rice	Democrat	
Ulster	3rd	George H. Bush	Democrat	
Warren		Scott Barton	Republican	
Washington	1st	Charles W. Larmon	Republican	
Washington	2nd	William H. Tefft	Republican	
Wayne	1st	Charles T. Saxton*	Republican	
Wayne	2nd	Richard P. Groat	Republican	
Westchester	1st	William Murray	Democrat	
Westchester	2nd	Bradford Rhodes*	Republican	
Westchester	3rd	James W. Husted*	Republican	
Wyoming		Greenleaf S. Van Gorder*	Republican	
Yates		William A. Carson	Republican	

=== Employees ===
- Clerk: Charles A. Chickering
- Sergeant-at-Arms: Owel H. Willard
- Doorkeeper: Homer B. Webb
- First Assistant Doorkeeper: John R. Harlow
- Second Assistant Doorkeeper: W. B. Clark
- Stenographer: George H. Thornton

== Sources ==
- The New York Red Book compiled by Edgar L. Murlin (published by James B. Lyon, Albany NY, 1897; see pg. 384f for senate districts; pg. 403 for senators; pg. 410–417 for Assembly districts; and pg. 507 for assemblymen)
- THE STATE LEGISLATURE in NYT on January 2, 1889
- THE EXCISE BILL PASSED in the New York Press on April 4, 1889
