= Van Gorder =

Van Gorder or VanGorder is a surname. Notable people with the surname include:

- Brian VanGorder (born 1959), American football coach
- Dave Van Gorder (1957–2025), American baseball player
- Greenleaf S. Van Gorder (1855–1933), New York politician
