= 111th New York State Legislature =

New York state legislative session

| ← | 110th | 112th | → |
- New York State Capitol (2009)

Overview
- Legislative body: New York State Legislature
- Jurisdiction: New York, United States
- Term: January 1 – December 31, 1888

Senate
- Members: 32
- President: Lt. Gov. Edward F. Jones (D)
- Temporary President: Henry R. Low (R)
- Party control: Republican (21-11)

Assembly
- Members: 128
- Speaker: Fremont Cole (R)
- Party control: Republican (72-56)

Sessions
- 1st: January 3 – May 11, 1888
- 2nd: July 17 – 20, 1888

The 111th New York State Legislature, consisting of the New York State Senate and the New York State Assembly, met from January 3 to July 20, 1888, during the fourth year of David B. Hill's governorship, in Albany.

== Background ==
Under the provisions of the New York Constitution of 1846, 32 Senators and 128 assemblymen were elected in single-seat districts; senators for a two-year term, assemblymen for a one-year term. The senatorial districts were made up of entire counties, except New York County (seven districts) and Kings County (three districts). The Assembly districts were made up of entire towns, or city wards, forming a contiguous area, all within the same county.

At this time there were two major political parties: the Democratic Party and the Republican Party. Three labor reform organizations nominated state tickets under the names of "United Labor", "Progressive Labor" and "Union Labor". The Prohibition Party, the Greenback Party, and a "Reform Party" also nominated tickets.

== Elections ==
The 1887 New York state election was held on November 8. All five statewide elective offices up for election were carried by the Democrats. The approximate party strength at this election, as expressed by the vote for Secretary of State, was: Democrats 470,000; Republicans 453,000; United Labor 70,000; and Prohibition 42,000.

== Sessions ==
The Legislature met for the regular session at the State Capitol in Albany on January 3, 1888; and adjourned on May 11.

Fremont Cole (R) was elected Speaker against William F. Sheehan (D).

Henry R. Low (R) was elected president pro tempore of the State Senate.

The Legislature met for a special session on July 17, and adjourned three days later. This session was called to consider the situation in the State prisons. Three laws were passed at the special session.

== State Senate ==
=== Districts ===
- 1st District: Queens and Suffolk counties
- 2nd District: 1st, 2nd, 5th, 6th, 8th, 9th, 10th, 12th and 22nd Ward of the City of Brooklyn, and the towns of Flatbush, Gravesend and New Utrecht in Kings County
- 3rd District: 3rd, 4th, 7th, 11th, 13th, 19th, 20th, 21st and 23rd Ward of the City of Brooklyn
- 4th District: 14th, 15th, 16th, 17th, 18th, 24th and 25th Ward of the City of Brooklyn, and the towns of New Lots and Flatlands in Kings County
- 5th District: Richmond County and the 1st, 2nd, 3rd, 5th, 6th, 8th, 14th and parts of the 4th and 9th Ward of New York City
- 6th District: 7th, 11th, 13th and part of the 4th Ward of NYC
- 7th District: 10th, 17th and part of the 15th, 18th and 21st Ward of NYC
- 8th District: 16th and part of the 9th, 15th, 18th, 20th and 21st Ward of NYC
- 9th District: Part of the 18th, 19th and 21st Ward of NYC
- 10th District: Part of the 12th, 19th, 20th, 21st and 22nd Ward of NYC
- 11th District: 23rd and 24th, and part of the 12th, 20th and 22nd Ward of NYC
- 12th District: Rockland and Westchester counties
- 13th District: Orange and Sullivan counties
- 14th District: Greene, Schoharie and Ulster counties
- 15th District: Columbia, Dutchess and Putnam counties
- 16th District: Rensselaer and Washington counties
- 17th District: Albany County
- 18th District: Fulton, Hamilton, Montgomery, Saratoga and Schenectady counties
- 19th District: Clinton, Essex and Warren counties
- 20th District: Franklin, Lewis and St. Lawrence counties
- 21st District: Oswego and Jefferson counties
- 22nd District: Oneida County
- 23rd District: Herkimer, Madison and Otsego counties
- 24th District: Chenango, Delaware and Broome counties
- 25th District: Onondaga and Cortland counties
- 26th District: Cayuga, Seneca, Tompkins and Tioga counties
- 27th District: Allegany, Chemung and Steuben counties
- 28th District: Ontario, Schuyler, Wayne and Yates counties
- 29th District: Monroe and Orleans counties
- 30th District: Genesee, Livingston, Niagara and Wyoming counties
- 31st District: Erie County
- 32nd District: Cattaraugus and Chautauqua counties

Note: There are now 62 counties in the State of New York. The counties which are not mentioned in this list had not yet been established, or sufficiently organized, the area being included in one or more of the abovementioned counties.

=== Members ===
The asterisk (*) denotes members of the previous Legislature who continued in office as members of this Legislature. George F. Langbein, Jacob A. Cantor, Eugene S. Ives, Michael F. Collins, George Z. Erwin, Frank B. Arnold and William L. Sweet changed from the Assembly to the Senate.

| District | Senator | Party | Notes |
|---|---|---|---|
| 1st | Simeon S. Hawkins | Republican | |
| 2nd | James F. Pierce* | Democrat | re-elected |
| 3rd | Eugene F. O'Connor | Republican | |
| 4th | Jacob Worth* | Republican | re-elected |
| 5th | Michael C. Murphy* | Democrat | re-elected |
| 6th | Edward F. Reilly* | Democrat | re-elected; on November 8, 1888, elected Clerk of New York County |
| 7th | George F. Langbein* | Democrat | |
| 8th | Cornelius Van Cott | Republican | |
| 9th | Charles A. Stadler | Democrat | |
| 10th | Jacob A. Cantor* | Democrat | Minority Leader |
| 11th | Eugene S. Ives* | Democrat | |
| 12th | William H. Robertson | Republican | |
| 13th | Henry R. Low* | Republican | re-elected; elected president pro tempore; died on December 1, 1888 |
| 14th | John J. Linson | Democrat | |
| 15th | Gilbert A. Deane | Republican | |
| 16th | Michael F. Collins* | Democrat | |
| 17th | Henry Russell | Republican | |
| 18th | John Foley | Democrat | |
| 19th | Rowland C. Kellogg* | Republican | re-elected |
| 20th | George Z. Erwin* | Republican | |
| 21st | George B. Sloan* | Republican | re-elected |
| 22nd | Henry J. Coggeshall* | Republican | re-elected |
| 23rd | Frank B. Arnold* | Republican | |
| 24th | William Lewis | Republican | |
| 25th | Francis Hendricks* | Republican | re-elected |
| 26th | William L. Sweet* | Republican | |
| 27th | J. Sloat Fassett* | Republican | re-elected |
| 28th | John Raines* | Republican | re-elected |
| 29th | Donald McNaughton | Democrat | |
| 30th | Edward C. Walker* | Republican | re-elected |
| 31st | John Laughlin | Republican | |
| 32nd | Commodore P. Vedder* | Republican | re-elected |

=== Employees ===
- Clerk: John S. Kenyon
- Sergeant-at-Arms: John W. Corning
- Doorkeeper: Charles V. Schram
- Assistant Doorkeeper: Hiram Van Tassel
- Stenographer: Harris A. Corell

== State Assembly ==
=== Assemblymen ===
The asterisk (*) denotes members of the previous Legislature who continued as members of this Legislature.

| District | | Assemblymen | Party | Notes |
|---|---|---|---|---|
| Albany | 1st | Frederick W. Conger | Democrat | |
| Albany | 2nd | Vreeland H. Youngman* | Republican | |
| Albany | 3rd | William J. Hill* | Democrat | |
| Albany | 4th | John T. Gorman* | Democrat | |
| Allegany | | Albert B. Cottrell | Republican | |
| Broome | | Alonzo D. Lewis | Republican | |
| Cattaraugus | 1st | Harrison Cheney | Republican | |
| Cattaraugus | 2nd | James S. Whipple | Republican | |
| Cayuga | 1st | John E. Savery | Republican | |
| Cayuga | 2nd | Coral C. White* | Republican | |
| Chautauqua | 1st | S. Frederick Nixon | Republican | |
| Chautauqua | 2nd | George H. Frost* | Republican | |
| Chemung | | Robert P. Bush* | Democrat | |
| Chenango | | Charles A. Fuller | Republican | |
| Clinton | | George S. Weed* | Democrat | |
| Columbia | | William Dinehart | Republican | |
| Cortland | | Wayland D. Tisdale* | Republican | |
| Delaware | | Charles J. Knapp | Republican | on November 8, 1888, elected to the 51st U.S. Congress |
| Dutchess | 1st | Willard H. Mase* | Republican | |
| Dutchess | 2nd | John I. Platt* | Republican | |
| Erie | 1st | William F. Sheehan* | Democrat | Minority Leader |
| Erie | 2nd | Matthias Endres | Democrat | |
| Erie | 3rd | Edward Gallagher* | Republican | |
| Erie | 4th | Henry H. Guenther* | Democrat | |
| Erie | 5th | Edward K. Emery* | Republican | |
| Essex | | Spencer G. Prime* | Republican | |
| Franklin | | Floyd J. Hadley* | Republican | |
| Fulton and Hamilton | | Lewis Brownell | Republican | |
| Genesee | | John M. McKenzie | Republican | |
| Greene | | John H. Bagley Jr. | Democrat | |
| Herkimer | | Patrick H. McEvoy* | Republican | |
| Jefferson | 1st | Anson S. Thompson* | Republican | |
| Jefferson | 2nd | Andrew C. Comstock | Republican | |
| Kings | 1st | Moses J. Wafer* | Democrat | |
| Kings | 2nd | William H. McLaughlin* | Democrat | |
| Kings | 3rd | Peter K. McCann* | Democrat | |
| Kings | 4th | Henry F. Haggerty* | Democrat | |
| Kings | 5th | Daniel B. Farrell | Ind. Dem. | |
| Kings | 6th | Thomas F. Magner | Democrat | on November 8, 1888, elected to the 51st U.S. Congress |
| Kings | 7th | John Reitz* | Republican | |
| Kings | 8th | John H. Bonnington* | Democrat | |
| Kings | 9th | Walter Mathison | Republican | |
| Kings | 10th | John B. Longley* | Democrat | |
| Kings | 11th | Joseph Aspinall | Republican | |
| Kings | 12th | Daniel W. Tallmadge | Republican | |
| Lewis | | Hugh Hughes | Republican | |
| Livingston | | Jotham Clark | Republican | |
| Madison | | Charles E. Maynard | Republican | |
| Monroe | 1st | Fletcher A. Defendorf* | Democrat | |
| Monroe | 2nd | P. Andrew Sullivan | Democrat | |
| Monroe | 3rd | William S. Church | Democrat | |
| Montgomery | | Robert Wemple* | Democrat | |
| New York | 1st | Daniel E. Finn* | Democrat | |
| New York | 2nd | Timothy D. Sullivan* | Democrat | |
| New York | 3rd | Thomas Smith Jr. | Democrat | |
| New York | 4th | Jeremiah Hayes* | Democrat | |
| New York | 5th | Michael Brennan* | Democrat | |
| New York | 6th | William J. McKenna* | Democrat | vacated his seat before the special session upon appointment as cashier in the Internal Revenue Collector's office |
| New York | 7th | Bankson T. Morgan | Republican | |
| New York | 8th | Philip Wissig | Democrat | |
| New York | 9th | John Martin* | Democrat | |
| New York | 10th | George F. Roesch | Democrat | |
| New York | 11th | Robert Ray Hamilton* | Republican | |
| New York | 12th | Solomon D. Rosenthal | Democrat | |
| New York | 13th | J. Wesley Smith | Democrat | |
| New York | 14th | Louis P. Rannow | Democrat | |
| New York | 15th | Charles A. Herrmann | Democrat | |
| New York | 16th | Edward P. Hagan* | Democrat | |
| New York | 17th | William Dalton* | Democrat | |
| New York | 18th | Joseph Gordon | Democrat | |
| New York | 19th | John Connelly | Democrat | |
| New York | 20th | William H. Hornidge* | Democrat | |
| New York | 21st | Ernest H. Crosby* | Republican | |
| New York | 22nd | Joseph Blumenthal | Democrat | |
| New York | 23rd | Nicholas R. O'Connor | Democrat | |
| New York | 24th | John B. Shea* | Democrat | |
| Niagara | 1st | Christian F. Goerss* | Republican | |
| Niagara | 2nd | Nelson D. Haskell | Republican | |
| Oneida | 1st | Joseph Harry Kent | Democrat | |
| Oneida | 2nd | George G. McAdam | Republican | |
| Oneida | 3rd | George Beatty Jr. | Republican | |
| Onondaga | 1st | Hector B. Johnson* | Republican | |
| Onondaga | 2nd | William H. Gallup | Republican | |
| Onondaga | 3rd | Walter W. Cheney | Republican | |
| Ontario | | Robert Moody | Republican | |
| Orange | 1st | John C. Adams | Republican | |
| Orange | 2nd | George W. Greene* | Democrat | |
| Orleans | | Ira Edwards | Republican | |
| Oswego | 1st | S. Mortimer Coon | Republican | |
| Oswego | 2nd | Danforth E. Ainsworth* | Republican | |
| Otsego | 1st | John S. Newton | Democrat | |
| Otsego | 2nd | Walter L. Brown | Republican | |
| Putnam | | Henry Mabie* | Republican | |
| Queens | 1st | John Cashow | Democrat | |
| Queens | 2nd | James L. Hogins | Democrat | |
| Rensselaer | 1st | George O'Neil | Democrat | |
| Rensselaer | 2nd | J. Irving Baucus* | Republican | |
| Rensselaer | 3rd | James Ryan Jr.* | Democrat | |
| Richmond | | George Cromwell | Republican | |
| Rockland | | Frank P. Demarest | Democrat | |
| St. Lawrence | 1st | N. Martin Curtis* | Republican | |
| St. Lawrence | 2nd | William H. Kimball* | Republican | |
| St. Lawrence | 3rd | Michael H. Flaherty | Republican | |
| Saratoga | 1st | Harvey J. Donaldson | Republican | |
| Saratoga | 2nd | Bartlett B. Grippin* | Republican | |
| Schenectady | | Austin A. Yates | Republican | |
| Schoharie | | Alonzo B. Coons | Democrat | |
| Schuyler | | Fremont Cole* | Republican | elected Speaker |
| Seneca | | James M. Martin | Democrat | |
| Steuben | 1st | Azariah C. Brundage* | Republican | |
| Steuben | 2nd | Milo M. Acker | Republican | |
| Suffolk | | Henry E. Huntting | Republican | |
| Sullivan | | Martin A. Smith* | Republican | |
| Tioga | | Jonathan C. Latimer* | Republican | |
| Tompkins | | Frank J. Enz | Republican | |
| Ulster | 1st | Christopher N. DeWitt | Republican | |
| Ulster | 2nd | John J. O'Reilly | Democrat | |
| Ulster | 3rd | Charles H. Weidner | Democrat | |
| Warren | | William D. Aldrich | Democrat | |
| Washington | 1st | J. Warren Fort* | Republican | |
| Washington | 2nd | Orson W. Sheldon | Democrat | |
| Wayne | 1st | Charles T. Saxton* | Republican | |
| Wayne | 2nd | Barnet H. Davis* | Republican | |
| Westchester | 1st | J. Irving Burns* | Republican | |
| Westchester | 2nd | Bradford Rhodes | Republican | |
| Westchester | 3rd | James W. Husted* | Republican | |
| Wyoming | | Greenleaf S. Van Gorder | Republican | |
| Yates | | George R. Cornwell* | Republican | |

=== Employees ===
- Clerk: Charles A. Chickering
- Sergeant-at-Arms: Isaac Scott
- Doorkeeper: Homer B. Webb
- First Assistant Doorkeeper: John P. Harlow
- Second Assistant Doorkeeper: Charles H. McNaughton
- Stenographer: William Loeb Jr.

== Sources ==
- The New York Red Book compiled by Edgar L. Murlin (published by James B. Lyon, Albany NY, 1897; see pg. 384f for senate districts; pg. 403 for senators; pg. 410–417 for Assembly districts; and pg. 506 for assemblymen)
- Biographical sketches of the members of the Legislature in The Evening Journal Almanac (1888)
- COLE NAMED FOR SPEAKER in NYT on January 3, 1888
