= Senator Cullen =

Senator Cullen may refer to:

- John J. Cullen (1845–1896), New York State Senate
- Mortimer A. Cullen (1891–1954), New York State Senate
- Thomas H. Cullen (1868–1944), New York State Senate
- Timothy Cullen (born 1944), Wisconsin State Senate
