= William Church =

William Church may refer to:

- William Church (inventor) (1778–1863), American inventor who patented a typesetting machine in 1822
- William Campbell Church (died 1915), Scottish rugby union player
- William Conant Church (1836–1917), American journalist and soldier
- William W. Church (1874–?), American football coach
- Sir William Church, 1st Baronet (1837–1928), English physician
- William S. Church (1858–?), American politician from New York

== See also ==
- Church (surname)
