= Henry E. Huntting =

American sailor, farmer, and politician

Henry Edward Huntting (April 17, 1828 – February 17, 1903) was an American sailor, farmer, and politician from Bridgehampton, New York.

== Life ==
Hutting was born on April 17, 1828 in Southampton, New York, the son of Henry Huntting and Harriet Sayre. His paternal grandfather was Col. Benjamin Huntting, a merchant and a member of the New York State Senate.

Huntting attended the district schools until he was 12, followed by the Southampton Academy until he was 17. He then went to Sag Harbor to learn the cooper's trade. He went on his first whaling voyage as cooper and second mate. On his second voyage, he was mate of the Jefferson under the command of his brother James R. Hutting. On his third voyage, he was captain of the Charles Carroll and made several cruises to the Arctic. He later commanded the Jefferson. In 1863, while commanding the Pacific, he encountered a gale that damaged the ship and made a return to port necessary. He returned to Sag Harbor in 1864, after which he never sailed again.

Huntting then bought a farm in Bridgehampton and became a farmer. In 1869, he became a Superintendent of the United States Life-Saving Service. He served in that position until President Grover Cleveland removed him in 1885. Later that year, he was elected to the New York State Assembly as a Republican, representing Suffolk County. He defeated Democrat Edward Hawkins in that election. He served in the Assembly in 1886, 1888, and 1889. He lost the 1886 election to Henry Augustus Reeves. In the 1889 session, he was Chairman of the Committee on Commerce and Navigation. In the Assembly, he introduced and helped pass a bill that annexed Lloyd's Neck to Suffolk County. He never again held public office after retiring from the Assembly, but he remained active with the Republican Party.

An active member of the Bridgehampton Presbyterian Church since he joined it in 1863, Huntting led the church's choir for 25 years. In 1857, he married Caroline Hildreth Foster. Their children were Mary F., Adelaide B. (wife of B. Bradley), and Harriet S.

Huntting died at home from pneumonia on February 17, 1903. He was buried in the Old Bridgehampton Cemetery.

New York State Assembly
Preceded by Simeon S. Hawkins	New York State Assembly; Suffolk County; 1886	Succeeded by Henry Augustus Reeves
Preceded by Henry Augustus Reeves	New York State Assembly; Suffolk County; 1888–1889	Succeeded by James H. Pierson
