= 110th New York State Legislature =

New York state legislative session

←	109th	111th	→
- New York State Capitol (2009)

Overview
- Legislative body: New York State Legislature
- Jurisdiction: New York, United States
- Term: January 1 – December 31, 1887

Senate
- Members: 32
- President: Lt. Gov. Edward F. Jones (D)
- Temporary President: Edmund L. Pitts (R)
- Party control: Republican (20-12)

Assembly
- Members: 128
- Speaker: James W. Husted (R)
- Party control: Republican (74-54)

Sessions
- 1st: January 4 – May 26, 1887

The 110th New York State Legislature, consisting of the New York State Senate and the New York State Assembly, met from January 4 to May 26, 1887, during the third year of David B. Hill's governorship, in Albany.

== Background ==
Under the provisions of the New York Constitution of 1846, 32 Senators and 128 assemblymen were elected in single-seat districts; senators for a two-year term, assemblymen for a one-year term. The senatorial districts were made up of entire counties, except New York County (seven districts) and Kings County (three districts). The Assembly districts were made up of entire towns, or city wards, forming a contiguous area, all within the same county.

At this time there were two major political parties: the Democratic Party and the Republican Party. In New York City the three Democratic factions (Tammany Hall, "Irving Hall" and the "County Democrats") re-united, and nominated joint candidates in most districts. The Prohibition Party and the Greenback Party also nominated tickets.

== Elections ==
The 1886 New York state election was held on November 2. The only statewide elective offices up for election was carried by a Democrat. The approximate party strength at this election, as expressed by the vote for Judge of the Court of Appeals, was: Democrats 468,000; Republicans 461,000; Prohibition 36,000; and Greenback 2,000.

== Sessions ==
The Legislature met for the regular session at the State Capitol in Albany on January 4, 1887; and adjourned on May 26.

James W. Husted (R) was re-elected Speaker.

On January 20, the Legislature elected Frank Hiscock (R) to succeed Warner Miller (R) as U.S. Senator from New York, for a six-year term beginning on March 4, 1887.

== State Senate ==
=== Districts ===
- 1st District: Queens and Suffolk counties
- 2nd District: 1st, 2nd, 5th, 6th, 8th, 9th, 10th, 12th and 22nd Ward of the City of Brooklyn, and the towns of Flatbush, Gravesend and New Utrecht in Kings County
- 3rd District: 3rd, 4th, 7th, 11th, 13th, 19th, 20th, 21st and 23rd Ward of the City of Brooklyn
- 4th District: 14th, 15th, 16th, 17th, 18th, 24th and 25th Ward of the City of Brooklyn, and the towns of New Lots and Flatlands in Kings County
- 5th District: Richmond County and the 1st, 2nd, 3rd, 5th, 6th, 8th, 14th and parts of the 4th and 9th Ward of New York City
- 6th District: 7th, 11th, 13th and part of the 4th Ward of NYC
- 7th District: 10th, 17th and part of the 15th, 18th and 21st Ward of NYC
- 8th District: 16th and part of the 9th, 15th, 18th, 20th and 21st Ward of NYC
- 9th District: Part of the 18th, 19th and 21st Ward of NYC
- 10th District: Part of the 12th, 19th, 20th, 21st and 22nd Ward of NYC
- 11th District: 23rd and 24th, and part of the 12th, 20th and 22nd Ward of NYC
- 12th District: Rockland and Westchester counties
- 13th District: Orange and Sullivan counties
- 14th District: Greene, Schoharie and Ulster counties
- 15th District: Columbia, Dutchess and Putnam counties
- 16th District: Rensselaer and Washington counties
- 17th District: Albany County
- 18th District: Fulton, Hamilton, Montgomery, Saratoga and Schenectady counties
- 19th District: Clinton, Essex and Warren counties
- 20th District: Franklin, Lewis and St. Lawrence counties
- 21st District: Oswego and Jefferson counties
- 22nd District: Oneida County
- 23rd District: Herkimer, Madison and Otsego counties
- 24th District: Chenango, Delaware and Broome counties
- 25th District: Onondaga and Cortland counties
- 26th District: Cayuga, Seneca, Tompkins and Tioga counties
- 27th District: Allegany, Chemung and Steuben counties
- 28th District: Ontario, Schuyler, Wayne and Yates counties
- 29th District: Monroe and Orleans counties
- 30th District: Genesee, Livingston, Niagara and Wyoming counties
- 31st District: Erie County
- 32nd District: Cattaraugus and Chautauqua counties

Note: There are now 62 counties in the State of New York. Modern-day Nassau County was part of Queens County, and modern-day Bronx County was divided between New York County west of the Bronx River and Westchester County east of it.

=== Members ===
The asterisk (*) denotes members of the previous Legislature who continued in office as members of this Legislature.

District	Senator	Party	Notes
1st	Edward F. Fagan*	Democrat	
2nd	James F. Pierce*	Democrat	
3rd	Stephen M. Griswold*	Republican	
4th	Jacob Worth*	Republican	
5th	Michael C. Murphy*	Democrat	
6th	Edward F. Reilly*	Democrat	
7th	James Daly*	Democrat	
8th	Thomas C. Dunham*	Democrat	
9th	John J. Cullen*	Democrat	
10th	William C. Traphagen*	Democrat	
11th	George W. Plunkitt*	Democrat	
12th	Henry C. Nelson*	Democrat	
13th	Henry R. Low*	Republican	
14th	Henry C. Connelly*	Republican	
15th	Jacob W. Hoysradt*	Republican	
16th	Albert C. Comstock*	Republican	
17th	Amasa J. Parker Jr.*	Democrat	
18th	Edward Wemple*	Democrat	on November 8, 1887, elected New York State Comptroller
19th	Rowland C. Kellogg*	Republican	
20th	Charles L. Knapp*	Republican	
21st	George B. Sloan*	Republican	
22nd	Henry J. Coggeshall*	Republican	
23rd	John E. Smith*	Republican	
24th	Matthew W. Marvin*	Republican	
25th	Francis Hendricks*	Republican	
26th	Charles F. Barager*	Republican	
27th	J. Sloat Fassett*	Republican	
28th	John Raines*	Republican	
29th	Edmund L. Pitts*	Republican	President pro tempore
30th	Edward C. Walker*	Republican	
31st	Daniel H. McMillan*	Republican	
32nd	Commodore P. Vedder*	Republican	

=== Employees ===
- Clerk: John W. Vrooman
- Assistant Clerk: John S. Kenyon
- Sergeant-at-Arms: James C. Murray
- Doorkeeper: John H. Houck
- Stenographer: Harris A. Corell

== State Assembly ==
=== Assemblymen ===
The asterisk (*) denotes members of the previous Legislature who continued as members of this Legislature.

District		Assemblymen	Party	Notes
Albany	1st	Horace T. Devereux	Democrat	
Albany	2nd	Vreeland H. Youngman	Republican	
Albany	3rd	William J. Hill	Democrat	
Albany	4th	John T. Gorman	Democrat	
Allegany		Washington Moses	Republican	
Broome		Isaac C. Edson*	Republican	
Cattaraugus	1st	Frederick W. Kruse*	Republican	
Cattaraugus	2nd	Erastus S. Ingersoll*	Republican	
Cayuga	1st	Frank M. Parsons*	Republican	
Cayuga	2nd	Coral C. White	Republican	
Chautauqua	1st	Dana P. Horton	Republican	
Chautauqua	2nd	George H. Frost	Republican	
Chemung		Robert P. Bush*	Democrat	
Chenango		Ralph Taylor	Republican	
Clinton		George S. Weed	Democrat	
Columbia		John C. Hogeboom*	Republican	
Cortland		Wayland D. Tisdale	Republican	
Delaware		David L. Thomson	Republican	
Dutchess	1st	Willard H. Mase	Republican	
Dutchess	2nd	John I. Platt*	Republican	
Erie	1st	William F. Sheehan*	Democrat	Minority Leader
Erie	2nd	Frank M. Giese*	Democrat	
Erie	3rd	Edward Gallagher*	Republican	
Erie	4th	Henry H. Guenther	Democrat	
Erie	5th	Edward K. Emery	Republican	
Essex		Spencer G. Prime	Republican	
Franklin		Floyd J. Hadley*	Republican	
Fulton and Hamilton		Alden W. Berry*	Republican	
Genesee		Charles A. Seaver*	Republican	
Greene		Francis G. Walters	Republican	
Herkimer		Patrick H. McEvoy	Republican	
Jefferson	1st	Anson S. Thompson	Republican	
Jefferson	2nd	Edward B. Bulkley*	Republican	
Kings	1st	Moses J. Wafer*	Democrat	
Kings	2nd	William H. McLaughlin*	Democrat	
Kings	3rd	Peter K. McCann*	Democrat	
Kings	4th	Henry F. Haggerty*	Democrat	
Kings	5th	James A. McMahon*	Democrat	
Kings	6th	Thomas F. Farrell*	Democrat	
Kings	7th	John Reitz	Republican	
Kings	8th	John H. Bonnington	Democrat	
Kings	9th	Alexander S. Bacon	Republican	
Kings	10th	John B. Longley*	Democrat	
Kings	11th	James P. Graham	Democrat	
Kings	12th	Richard V. B. Newton*	Democrat	
Lewis		Rutson Rea*	Republican	
Livingston		William Y. Robinson*	Republican	
Madison		William S. Leete*	Republican	
Monroe	1st	Fletcher A. Defendorf	Democrat	
Monroe	2nd	Edward W. Maurer	Republican	
Monroe	3rd	George W. Sime*	Republican	
Montgomery		Robert Wemple	Democrat	
New York	1st	Daniel E. Finn*	Democrat	
New York	2nd	Timothy D. Sullivan	Tammany Dem.	
New York	3rd	James E. Power*	Democrat	
New York	4th	Jeremiah Hayes*	Democrat	
New York	5th	Michael Brennan*	Tammany Dem.	
New York	6th	William J. McKenna	Democrat	
New York	7th	George H. Henry	Republican	
New York	8th	Charles Smith*	Republican	
New York	9th	John Martin	Democrat	
New York	10th	George F. Langbein	Democrat	
New York	11th	Robert Ray Hamilton*	Republican	
New York	12th	Leonard A. Giegerich	Tammany Dem.	
New York	13th	William P. Mulry	Democrat	
New York	14th	Jacob Kunzenman	Tammany Dem.	
New York	15th	George H. McAdam	Tammany Dem.	
New York	16th	Edward P. Hagan*	Democrat	
New York	17th	William Dalton*	Democrat	
New York	18th	John F. Kenny	Tammany Dem.	
New York	19th	Eugene S. Ives	Democrat	
New York	20th	William H. Hornidge	Tammany Dem.	
New York	21st	Ernest H. Crosby	Republican	
New York	22nd	John F. McIntyre	Democrat	
New York	23rd	Jacob A. Cantor*	Democrat	
New York	24th	John B. Shea*	County Dem.	
Niagara	1st	Christian F. Goerss	Republican	
Niagara	2nd	Peter A. Porter*	Republican	
Oneida	1st	Benjamin Hall*	Republican	
Oneida	2nd	Robert W. Evans*	Republican	
Oneida	3rd	John C. Davies	Republican	
Onondaga	1st	Hector B. Johnson	Republican	
Onondaga	2nd	Alfred E. Stacey*	Republican	
Onondaga	3rd	Thomas McCarthy*	Republican	
Ontario		Edward P. Babcock*	Republican	
Orange	1st	Robert H. Smith*	Republican	
Orange	2nd	George W. Greene*	Democrat	
Orleans		Samuel A. Bates*	Republican	
Oswego	1st	Henry C. Howe*	Republican	
Oswego	2nd	Danforth E. Ainsworth*	Republican	
Otsego	1st	Lowell S. Henry*	Democrat	
Otsego	2nd	Frank B. Arnold*	Republican	
Putnam		Henry Mabie*	Republican	
Queens	1st	Joseph Fitch*	Democrat	
Queens	2nd	William J. Hines	Democrat	
Rensselaer	1st	Michael F. Collins*	Democrat	
Rensselaer	2nd	J. Irving Baucus	Republican	
Rensselaer	3rd	James Ryan Jr.	Democrat	
Richmond		Edward A. Moore	Democrat	
Rockland		George Dickey*	Democrat	
St. Lawrence	1st	N. Martin Curtis*	Republican	
St. Lawrence	2nd	William H. Kimball	Republican	
St. Lawrence	3rd	George Z. Erwin*	Republican	
Saratoga	1st	John H. Burke	Democrat	
Saratoga	2nd	Bartlett B. Grippin	Republican	
Schenectady		Edward D. Cutler*	Democrat	
Schoharie		Emory Stevens	Democrat	
Schuyler		Fremont Cole*	Republican	
Seneca		William L. Sweet	Republican	
Steuben	1st	Azariah C. Brundage	Republican	
Steuben	2nd	Charles D. Baker*	Republican	
Suffolk		Henry A. Reeves	Democrat	
Sullivan		Martin A. Smith	Republican	
Tioga		Jonathan C. Latimer	Republican	
Tompkins		Walter G. Smith	Republican	
Ulster	1st	Thomas Maxwell	Republican	
Ulster	2nd	Willet I. Van Demark	Republican	
Ulster	3rd	Davis Winne	Democrat	
Warren		James C. Eldridge	Republican	
Washington	1st	J. Warren Fort	Republican	
Washington	2nd	James H. Manville*	Republican	
Wayne	1st	Charles T. Saxton	Republican	
Wayne	2nd	Barnet H. Davis*	Republican	
Westchester	1st	J. Irving Burns	Republican	
Westchester	2nd	Samuel Conover	Democrat	
Westchester	3rd	James W. Husted*	Republican	elected Speaker
Wyoming		Edward A. Pierce*	Republican	
Yates		George R. Cornwell	Republican	

=== Employees ===
- Clerk: Charles A. Chickering
- Sergeant-at-Arms: Isaac Scott
- Doorkeeper: Michael Maher
- Stenographer: Emory P. Close

== Sources ==
- The New York Red Book compiled by Edgar L. Murlin (published by James B. Lyon, Albany NY, 1897; see pg. 384f for senate districts; pg. 403 for senators; pg. 410–417 for Assembly districts; and pg. 505f for assemblymen)
- Biographical sketches of the members of the Legislature in The Evening Journal Almanac] (1887)
