= Edward P. Hagan =

American politician

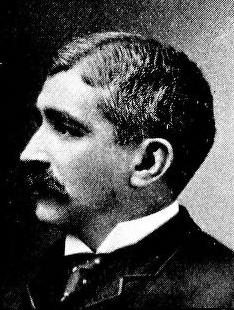
Edward P. Hagan (1893)

Edward Patrick Hagan (February 1, 1846 New York City – February 20, 1893 New York City) was an American politician from New York.

== Life ==
He attended the public schools and graduated from City College of New York. Then, he became a saloon keeper and later engaged in the real estate business.

He was a member of the New York State Assembly (New York Co., 16th D.) in 1879, 1880, 1885, 1886, 1887, 1888 and 1889. He was Deputy Street Cleaning Commissioner of New York City in 1890.

He was a member of the New York State Senate (9th D.) in 1892 and 1893.

He died on February 20, 1893, at the Roosevelt Hospital in New York City, from "a complication of diseases" and after a laparotomy had been performed.

== Sources ==
- The New York Red Book compiled by Edgar L. Murlin (published by James B. Lyon, Albany NY, 1897; pg. 404, 499f and 504–507)
- Fourth Annual Record of Assemblymen and Senators from the City of New York in the State Legislature published by the City Reform Club (1889; pg. 57ff)
- New York State Legislative Souvenir for 1893 with Portraits of the Members of Both Houses by Henry P. Phelps (pg. 12f)
- EDWARD P. HAGAN IS DEAD in NYT on February 21, 1893

New York State Assembly
Preceded by James Fitzgerald	New York State Assembly; New York County, 16th District; 1879–1880	Succeeded by Francis B. Spinola
Preceded by Peter F. Murray	New York State Assembly; New York County, 16th District; 1885–1889	Succeeded by Walter G. Byrne
New York State Senate
Preceded by Charles A. Stadler	New York State Senate; 9th District; 1892–1893	Succeeded by Thomas F. Cunningham
