= Rowland C. Kellogg =

American politician

Rowland Case Kellogg (December 31, 1843 – January 15, 1911) was an American lawyer and politician from New York.

== Life ==
Kellogg was born on December 31, 1843, in Elizabethtown, New York. He was the son of Congressman Orlando Kellogg and Polly (Woodruff) Kellogg.

During the American Civil War he enlisted as a private and rose to the rank of brevet major, being commissary of subsistence of different army formations, lastly as Division Commissary of the Union Army of the Shenandoah.

He married Mary E. Livingston and they had several children.

He was Supervisor of the Town of Elizabethtown from 1869 to 1873; Chairman of the Board of Supervisors of Essex County for two years; District Attorney of Essex County from 1877 to 1885; and a member of the New York State Senate (19th D.) from 1886 to 1889, sitting in the 109th, 110th, 111th and 112th New York State Legislatures.

On November 13, 1895, he was appointed by Gov. Levi P. Morton as Judge of Essex County to fill the vacancy caused by the resignation of Chester B. McLaughlin who had been elected to the New York Supreme Court.

Kellogg died on January 15, 1911, in Elizabethtown, New York. He was buried at the Riverside Cemetery in Elizabethtown.

== Sources ==
- The New York Red Book compiled by Edgar L. Murlin (published by James B. Lyon, Albany NY, 1897; pg. 403)
- Biographical sketches of the members of the Legislature in The Evening Journal Almanac (1888)
- KELLOGG A COUNTY JUDGE in NYT on November 14, 1895
- Riverside Cemetery transcriptions at RootsWeb

New York State Senate
| Preceded by Shepard P. Bowen | New York State Senate; 19th District; 1886–1889 | Succeeded by Louis W. Emerson |
