= Frederick S. Gibbs =

American politician

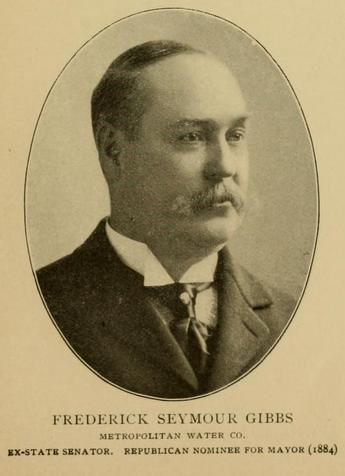
Frederick S. Gibbs

Frederick Seymour Gibbs (March 22, 1845 Seneca Falls, Seneca County, New York – September 21, 1903 Asbury Park, Monmouth County, New Jersey) was an American politician from New York.

== Life and career ==
Gibbs attended the public schools. He fought in the American Civil War with the 148th New York Volunteers, and finished the war as a brevet first lieutenant. He then became a clerk with the Gould Pump Company, in Seneca Falls, and later was the Metropolitan representative of the company in New York City. On June 20, 1867, he married Caroline A. Mynderse.

Gibbs was a member of the New York State Senate (8th D.) in 1884 and 1885. In 1884, he was the Republican candidate for Mayor of New York City, but came in third behind William R. Grace (County and Irving Hall Dem.) and Hugh J. Grant (Tammany Dem.). he was a member of the New York State Assembly (New York Co., 13th D.) in 1889 and 1890.

On September 5, 1895, he married Daisy M. Meade. He was a member of the Republican National Committee from 1896 until his death; and was President of the Metropolitan Water Company.

Gibbs died on September 21, 1903, from "aneurism of the heart", and was buried at the Green-Wood Cemetery in Brooklyn.

New York State Senate
Preceded by John W. Browning	New York State Senate; 8th District; 1884–1885	Succeeded by Thomas C. Dunham
New York State Assembly
Preceded by J. Wesley Smith	New York State Assembly; New York County, 13th District; 1889–1890	Succeeded by James H. Southworth
