= Cornelius A. J. Hardenbergh =

American politician (1826–1893)

Cornelius Abram Jansen Hardenbergh (January 31, 1826 – January 10, 1893) was an American politician from New York.

== Early life ==
He was the son of Jacob Rutsen Hardenbergh (1791-1858) and Rachel (nee Jansen) Hardenbergh (1796-1833). His father was born in Rosendale, New York, and his mother in Shawangunk. His parents were first cousins, once removed, with Jansen's mother being a Hardenburgh, and had been married on April 3, 1822. After his mother's death, Hardenbergh's father re-married, this time to his own second cousin, Cornelia Ann Hardenbergh (1810-1886). Cornelius had five brothers: Louis Van DeBergh Hardenbergh (1823-1890), Matthew Hardenbergh (1824-1894), Martin Stanley Hardenbergh (1828-1903), Abraham Jansen Hardenbergh (1830-1894), and Thomas Nicholas Jansen Hardenbergh (1830-1832).

Hardenbergh was a wagonmaker in Ulsterville, a hamlet of Shawangunk, and gave up his business when a law creating a tax on manufacturers caused him to believe it was unjust. He was selected as the Town of Shawangunk's Justice of the Peace in 1858 and again in 1860.

== Politics ==
Hardenbergh was elected supervisor of Shawangunk, and served in that capacity from 1861 to 1867. Within those years, he also served as Justice of the Peace in 1862, 1863, and 1865. Known as C.A.J. Hardenbergh in documents, Hardenbergh was a believer in the American Civil War and against the emancipation of slaves, as he was a member of the Democratic Party. Following his term as supervisor, Hardenbergh returned to being a farmer, something he had taken up after abandoning his wagonmaking business.

Hardenbergh was again elected supervisor of Shawangunk, serving from 1876 to 1882. He was opposed to the levy of the tax for the payment of the railroad bonds, something that got him re-elected multiple times. He began to increase his political influence and was even more outspoken than his first time being supervisor. As the governing body of Ulster County, the Ulster County Board of Supervisors (made up of the supervisors elected from each town, as well as a clerk and lawyer) was a likely place for Hardenbergh to continue to voice his supports and oppositions. From 1877 to 1878, he served as the chairman of that organization.

Hardenbergh was a member of the New York State Assembly (Ulster Co., 3rd D.) in 1885 and 1886. It was during this time that Hardenbergh pushed for the creation of a Forest Preserve within the Catskill Mountains. New York State owned millions of acres of land in the Adirondacks and decided they wanted to try to profit some of it, selling off to loggers and railroads, who were only interested in cutting timber and turning that into profit for themselves. Hardenbergh was unhappy with the taxes that the state levied against counties for the lands that lay within the Catskills, because the law required counties to acquire the tax delinquent land and then pay taxes on that land. Hardenbergh was able to keep Ulster County from having to pay these taxes on and off from 1879 to 1884. However, his election to the Assembly allowed him to establish his own bill within the legislature, resulting in a passing of a law that the state would take over the land, without taxing the county for the sales, and cancelled all previous sales of land from the county to the state. This law was foundational in the eventual creation of the Catskill Park.

Hardenbergh died on January 10, 1893, and was buried in the New Prospect Dutch Reformed Church Cemetery in Pine Bush, New York.

== Personal life and family ==
His father and step-mother, Cornelia, had five children of their own following their marriage on September 13, 1834. It is not clear why the first child of this marriage was not born until eight years later. The children of this marriage were Herman Rutsen Hardenbergh (1842-1886), Stella Hardenbergh Waters (1846-1920), Jemima Bruyn Hardenbergh Perrine (1848-1929), Mary Margaret Hardenbergh Madden (1849-1939), Laura DeVroon Hardenbergh Humphrey (1853-1933), and Clara Louise Hardenbergh (1857-1941).

His paternal grandfather, Lewis Hardenbergh (1771-1792), was killed after being trampled by his own horse. His paternal grandmother, Maritje Hasbrouck Hardenbergh (a 2nd cousin of her own husband), re-married to Abraham Jansen (1782-1847), whose sister was Cornelius's mother Rachel. Abraham was a first cousin of Maritje, his own mother also being a Hardenbergh.

His paternal great-grandfather, Jacob Rutsen Hardenbergh, was a co-founder of Queen's College in 1766, now known as Rutgers University. He served as the first president of that institution (1786 to 1790), and as a New Jersey Assemblyman in 1789. He was a descendant of Louis DuBois, a Huguenot who fled religious persecution in France and helped form New Paltz, New York, as well as the Hasbrouck family.

His first cousin, thrice removed was Thomas Jansen, Jr., who served as the Shawangunk Supervisor from 1778 to 1779 and in 1784. His second cousin twice removed was John Jansen (son of Thomas), who served as the Shawangunk Supervisor from 1822 to 1826. His third cousin once removed was Matthew Jansen (son of John), who served as Shawangunk Supervisor in 1856. His second cousin was Augustus Albert Hardenbergh, a New Jersey State assemblyman (1853 to 1854) and a United States Congressman from that same state (1875 to 1879 and 1881 to 1883). His second cousin once removed was Henry Janeway Hardenbergh, an architect. In 1885, he served alongside his fourth cousin, once removed, Gilbert D. B. Hasbrouck, who was the Ulster County representative from the 2nd District. He was related to at least 14 Town of Shawangunk supervisors.

His 3rd great-grandfather was Johannes Hardenbergh.

New York State Assembly
Preceded by George R. Johnson	New York State Assembly; Ulster County, 3rd District; 1885-1886	Succeeded by Davis Winne
Preceded by Edmund Bruyn	Shawangunk Supervisor; Ulster County; 1861-1867	Succeeded by Eli Van Keuren
Preceded by Samuel Dill Jr.	Shawangunk Supervisor; Ulster County; 1876-1882	Succeeded by Elias Mulford
Preceded by Robert Loughran	Chairman of the Ulster County Board of Supervisors; 1877-1878	Succeeded by Robert Loughran
