= 109th New York State Legislature =

New York state legislative session

←	108th	110th	→
- New York State Capitol (2009)

Overview
- Legislative body: New York State Legislature
- Jurisdiction: New York, United States
- Term: January 1 – December 31, 1886

Senate
- Members: 32
- President: Lt. Gov. Edward F. Jones (D)
- Temporary President: Edmund L. Pitts (R)
- Party control: Republican (20-12)

Assembly
- Members: 128
- Speaker: James W. Husted (R)
- Party control: Republican (77-51)

Sessions
- 1st: January 5 – May 20, 1886

The 109th New York State Legislature, consisting of the New York State Senate and the New York State Assembly, met from January 5 to May 20, 1886, during the second year of David B. Hill's governorship, in Albany.

== Background ==
Under the provisions of the New York Constitution of 1846, 32 Senators and 128 assemblymen were elected in single-seat districts; senators for a two-year term, assemblymen for a one-year term. The senatorial districts were made up of entire counties, except New York County (seven districts) and Kings County (three districts). The Assembly districts were made up of entire towns, or city wards, forming a contiguous area, all within the same county.

At this time there were two major political parties: the Democratic Party and the Republican Party. In New York City the Democrats were split into three factions: Tammany Hall, "Irving Hall" and the "County Democrats". The Prohibition Party and the Greenback Party also nominated tickets.

== Elections ==
The 1885 New York state election was held on November 3. Governor David B. Hill was re-elected; and Edward F. Jones was elected lieutenant governor. The other five statewide elective offices up for election were also carried by the Democrats. The approximate party strength at this election, as expressed by the vote for Governor, was: Democrats 501,000; Republicans 490,000; Prohibition 31,000; and Greenback 2,000.

== Sessions ==
The Legislature met for the regular session at the State Capitol in Albany on January 5, 1886; and adjourned on May 20.

James W. Husted (R) was again elected Speaker, against William F. Sheehan (D).

Edmund L. Pitts (R) was elected president pro tempore of the State Senate.

== State Senate ==
=== Districts ===
- 1st District: Queens and Suffolk counties
- 2nd District: 1st, 2nd, 5th, 6th, 8th, 9th, 10th, 12th and 22nd Ward of the City of Brooklyn, and the towns of Flatbush, Gravesend and New Utrecht in Kings County
- 3rd District: 3rd, 4th, 7th, 11th, 13th, 19th, 20th, 21st and 23rd Ward of the City of Brooklyn
- 4th District: 14th, 15th, 16th, 17th, 18th, 24th and 25th Ward of the City of Brooklyn, and the towns of New Lots and Flatlands in Kings County
- 5th District: Richmond County and the 1st, 2nd, 3rd, 5th, 6th, 8th, 14th and parts of the 4th and 9th Ward of New York City
- 6th District: 7th, 11th, 13th and part of the 4th Ward of NYC
- 7th District: 10th, 17th and part of the 15th, 18th and 21st Ward of NYC
- 8th District: 16th and part of the 9th, 15th, 18th, 20th and 21st Ward of NYC
- 9th District: Part of the 18th, 19th and 21st Ward of NYC
- 10th District: Part of the 12th, 19th, 20th, 21st and 22nd Ward of NYC
- 11th District: 23rd and 24th, and part of the 12th, 20th and 22nd Ward of NYC
- 12th District: Rockland and Westchester counties
- 13th District: Orange and Sullivan counties
- 14th District: Greene, Schoharie and Ulster counties
- 15th District: Columbia, Dutchess and Putnam counties
- 16th District: Rensselaer and Washington counties
- 17th District: Albany County
- 18th District: Fulton, Hamilton, Montgomery, Saratoga and Schenectady counties
- 19th District: Clinton, Essex and Warren counties
- 20th District: Franklin, Lewis and St. Lawrence counties
- 21st District: Oswego and Jefferson counties
- 22nd District: Oneida County
- 23rd District: Herkimer, Madison and Otsego counties
- 24th District: Chenango, Delaware and Broome counties
- 25th District: Onondaga and Cortland counties
- 26th District: Cayuga, Seneca, Tompkins and Tioga counties
- 27th District: Allegany, Chemung and Steuben counties
- 28th District: Ontario, Schuyler, Wayne and Yates counties
- 29th District: Monroe and Orleans counties
- 30th District: Genesee, Livingston, Niagara and Wyoming counties
- 31st District: Erie County
- 32nd District: Cattaraugus and Chautauqua counties

Note: There are now 62 counties in the State of New York. The counties which are not mentioned in this list had not yet been established, or sufficiently organized, the area being included in one or more of the abovementioned counties.

=== Members ===
The asterisk (*) denotes members of the previous Legislature who continued in office as members of this Legislature. Edward F. Reilly, Francis Hendricks, Charles F. Barager and John Raines changed from the Assembly to the Senate.

District	Senator	Party	Notes
1st	Edward F. Fagan	Democrat	
2nd	James F. Pierce	Democrat	
3rd	Stephen M. Griswold	Republican	
4th	Jacob Worth	Republican	
5th	Michael C. Murphy*	County Dem.	re-elected
6th	Edward F. Reilly*	Tammany Dem.	
7th	James Daly*	Democrat	re-elected
8th	Thomas C. Dunham	Democrat	
9th	John J. Cullen*	Tam./Irv. H. Dem.	re-elected
10th	William C. Traphagen	Democrat	
11th	George W. Plunkitt*	Tammany Dem.	re-elected
12th	Henry C. Nelson*	Democrat	re-elected
13th	Henry R. Low*	Republican	re-elected
14th	Henry C. Connelly	Republican	
15th	Jacob W. Hoysradt	Republican	
16th	Albert C. Comstock*	Republican	re-elected
17th	Amasa J. Parker Jr.	Democrat	
18th	Edward Wemple	Democrat	
19th	Rowland C. Kellogg	Republican	
20th	Charles L. Knapp	Republican	
21st	George B. Sloan	Republican	
22nd	Henry J. Coggeshall*	Republican	re-elected
23rd	John E. Smith	Republican	
24th	Matthew W. Marvin	Republican	
25th	Francis Hendricks*	Republican	
26th	Charles F. Barager*	Republican	
27th	J. Sloat Fassett*	Republican	re-elected
28th	John Raines*	Republican	
29th	Edmund L. Pitts	Republican	elected President pro tempore
30th	Edward C. Walker	Republican	
31st	Daniel H. McMillan	Republican	
32nd	Commodore P. Vedder*	Republican	re-elected

=== Employees ===
- Clerk: John W. Vrooman
- Sergeant-at-Arms: James C. Murray
- Doorkeeper: John H. Houck
- Stenographer: Harris A. Corell

== State Assembly ==
=== Assemblymen ===
The asterisk (*) denotes members of the previous Legislature who continued as members of this Legislature.

District		Assemblymen	Party	Notes
Albany	1st	John Bowe	Democrat	
Albany	2nd	Smith O'Brien	Republican	
Albany	3rd	Norton Chase	Democrat	
Albany	4th	Terence I. Hardin*	Democrat	
Allegany		William R. McEwen*	Republican	
Broome		Isaac C. Edson	Republican	
Cattaraugus	1st	Frederick W. Kruse*	Republican	
Cattaraugus	2nd	Erastus S. Ingersoll	Republican	
Cayuga	1st	Frank M. Parsons	Republican	
Cayuga	2nd	Michael B. Van Buskirk*	Republican	
Chautauqua	1st	Jerome Babcock	Republican	
Chautauqua	2nd	Newell Cheney	Republican	
Chemung		Robert P. Bush	Democrat	
Chenango		Truman I. Matterson	Republican	
Clinton		George W. Palmer*	Republican	
Columbia		John C. Hogeboom*	Republican	
Cortland		Milfred M. Brown	Republican	
Delaware		Charles J. Knapp	Republican	
Dutchess	1st	Joseph H. Storm*	Republican	
Dutchess	2nd	John I. Platt	Republican	
Erie	1st	William F. Sheehan*	Democrat	Minority Leader
Erie	2nd	Frank M. Giese*	Democrat	
Erie	3rd	Edward Gallagher	Republican	
Erie	4th	John Kraus	Republican	
Erie	5th	Amos H. Baker*	Republican	
Essex		Wesley Barnes*	Republican	
Franklin		Floyd J. Hadley	Republican	
Fulton and Hamilton		Alden W. Berry*	Republican	
Genesee		Charles A. Seaver	Republican	
Greene		Stephen T. Hopkins*	Republican	on November 2, 1886, elected to the 50th U.S. Congress
Herkimer		John M. Budlong*	Republican	
Jefferson	1st	Allen E. Kilby*	Republican	
Jefferson	2nd	Edward B. Bulkley	Republican	
Kings	1st	Moses J. Wafer*	Democrat	
Kings	2nd	William H. McLaughlin	Democrat	
Kings	3rd	Peter K. McCann*	Democrat	
Kings	4th	Henry F. Haggerty*	Democrat	
Kings	5th	James A. McMahon	Democrat	
Kings	6th	Thomas F. Farrell*	Democrat	
Kings	7th	George H. Lindsay*	Democrat	
Kings	8th	Robert E. Connelly*	Democrat	
Kings	9th	James A. Brown	Republican	
Kings	10th	John B. Longley	Democrat	
Kings	11th	Henry D. Hotchkiss	Democrat	
Kings	12th	Richard V. B. Newton	Democrat	
Lewis		Rutson Rea	Republican	
Livingston		William Y. Robinson	Republican	
Madison		William S. Leete	Republican	
Monroe	1st	Frank Gardner	Republican	
Monroe	2nd	Charles R. Pratt	Republican	
Monroe	3rd	George W. Sime	Republican	
Montgomery		Thomas Liddle*	Republican	
New York	1st	Daniel E. Finn*	County/Irv. H. Dem.	
New York	2nd	Thomas Maher	Tammany Dem.	
New York	3rd	James E. Power	County Dem.	
New York	4th	Jeremiah Hayes	Tam./Irv. H. Dem.	
New York	5th	Michael Brennan*	County Dem.	
New York	6th	Philip Kiernan	Ind./Tam./Irv. H. Dem.	Assemblyman-elect William Hall died November 30, 1885; Kiernan elected to fill vacancy on December 29, 1885
New York	7th	Lucas L. Van Allen*	Republican	
New York	8th	Charles Smith*	Republican	
New York	9th	John D. Naugle	Tam./County Dem.	
New York	10th	Charles A. Binder	Republican	
New York	11th	Robert Ray Hamilton	Republican	
New York	12th	Moses Dinkelspiel	County Dem.	
New York	13th	John P. Windolph*	Republican	
New York	14th	Lewis J. Conlan	Tam./Irv. H. Dem.	
New York	15th	Werner Bruns	Tammany Dem.	
New York	16th	Edward P. Hagan*	County Dem.	
New York	17th	William Dalton	Democrat	
New York	18th	William J. Hill	Tammany Dem.	
New York	19th	John McManus	Ind. Dem.	
New York	20th	James Haggerty*	Ind. Dem.	
New York	21st	George W. Lyon	Republican	
New York	22nd	Edward J. Shelley	Tam./Irv. H. Dem.	
New York	23rd	Jacob A. Cantor*	Tammany Dem.	
New York	24th	John B. Shea*	County/Irv. H. Dem.	unsuccessfully contested
Niagara	1st	Lewis P. Gordon	Democrat	
Niagara	2nd	Peter A. Porter	Republican	
Oneida	1st	Benjamin Hall	Republican	
Oneida	2nd	Robert W. Evans	Republican	
Oneida	3rd	Israel J. White	Republican	
Onondaga	1st	Wallace Tappan*	Republican	
Onondaga	2nd	Alfred E. Stacey	Republican	
Onondaga	3rd	Thomas McCarthy	Republican	
Ontario		Edward P. Babcock	Republican	
Orange	1st	Robert H. Smith	Republican	
Orange	2nd	George W. Greene*	Democrat	
Orleans		Samuel A. Bates	Republican	
Oswego	1st	Henry C. Howe*	Republican	
Oswego	2nd	Danforth E. Ainsworth	Republican	
Otsego	1st	Lowell S. Henry	Democrat	
Otsego	2nd	Frank B. Arnold*	Republican	
Putnam		Henry Mabie	Republican	
Queens	1st	Joseph Fitch	Democrat	
Queens	2nd	James S. Allen	Republican	
Rensselaer	1st	Michael F. Collins	Democrat	
Rensselaer	2nd	Eugene L. Demers*	Republican	
Rensselaer	3rd	Thomas Dickson	Republican	
Richmond		Edward P. Doyle	Democrat	
Rockland		George Dickey	Democrat	
St. Lawrence	1st	N. Martin Curtis*	Ind. Rep.	
St. Lawrence	2nd	Andrew Tuck*	Republican	
St. Lawrence	3rd	George Z. Erwin*	Republican	
Saratoga	1st	William M. Donald	Republican	
Saratoga	2nd	George S. Batcheller	Republican	
Schenectady		Edward D. Cutler*	Democrat	
Schoharie		Charles Brewster	Democrat	
Schuyler		Fremont Cole*	Republican	
Seneca		Stephen Duncan Leverich	Democrat	
Steuben	1st	Franz S. Wolf	Democrat	
Steuben	2nd	Charles D. Baker*	Republican	
Suffolk		Henry E. Huntting	Republican	
Sullivan		James D. Decker*	Democrat	
Tioga		Adolphus G. Allen	Republican	
Tompkins		Charles M. Titus	Republican	
Ulster	1st	Benjamin M. Freligh	Republican	
Ulster	2nd	Herman Craft	Republican	
Ulster	3rd	Cornelius A. J. Hardenbergh*	Democrat	
Warren		John Peart Jr.	Republican	
Washington	1st	Daniel M. Westfall	Republican	
Washington	2nd	James H. Manville	Republican	
Wayne	1st	William Wood	Democrat	
Wayne	2nd	Barnet H. Davis	Republican	
Westchester	1st	Charles P. McClelland*	Democrat	
Westchester	2nd	Norman A. Lawlor	Democrat	
Westchester	3rd	James W. Husted*	Republican	elected Speaker
Wyoming		Edward A. Pierce	Republican	
Yates		Clark E. Smith*	Republican	

=== Employees ===
- Clerk: Charles A. Chickering
- Sergeant-at-Arms: Edward H. Talbott
- Doorkeeper: Michael Maher
- Stenographer: Emory P. Close

== Sources ==
- The New York Red Book compiled by Edgar L. Murlin (published by James B. Lyon, Albany NY, 1897; see pg. 384f for senate districts; pg. 403 for senators; pg. 410–417 for Assembly districts; and pg. 504f for assemblymen)
- Biographical sketches of the members of the Legislature in The Evening Journal Almanac (1886)
