= Edward Gallagher (politician) =

American politician

Edward Gallagher (December 20, 1829 – March 8, 1896) was an American businessman and politician from New York.

== Life ==
Gallagher was born on December 20, 1829, in Albany, New York. His parents were Irish immigrants.

He attended public school in Albany and Hicks' Business College in Buffalo. He moved to Buffalo as a boy, and had an office in the Buffalo Central Wharf. He forwarded grain East over the Erie Canal. He was a founding member and trustee of the Buffalo Merchants' Exchange, and a member of the Ancient Order of United Workmen.

In 1874, Gallagher was elected to the New York State Assembly as a Republican, representing Erie County, 3rd District. He would serve in the Assembly in 1875, 1876, 1877, 1886, 1887, 1888, 1891, 1892, and 1893.

Gallagher's wife's name was Martha. Their children were William B., Kate C., Frank B., James H., and Robert W.

He died at home on March 8, 1896. He was buried in Forest Lawn Cemetery.

New York State Assembly
| Preceded by Franklin A. Alberger | New York State Assembly; Erie County, 3rd District; 1875-1877 | Succeeded by David Day |
| Preceded by William W. Hawkins | New York State Assembly; Erie County, 3rd District; 1886-1888 | Succeeded by Leroy Andrus |
| Preceded by Leroy Andrus | New York State Assembly; Erie County, 3rd District; 1891-1892 | Succeeded by Joseph Lenhard |
| Preceded by Henry H. Guenther | New York State Assembly; Erie County, 4th District; 1893 | Succeeded by Joseph L. Whittet |
