= Charles F. Barager =

American politician

Charles Frederick Barager (born December 5, 1838 Candor, Tioga County, New York) was an American lawyer, merchant, manufacturer and politician from New York.

== Life ==
He was the son of Assemblyman Samuel Barager (1793–1871) and Ruhamah (Sears) Barager (1797–1878). He attended the district school in Candor. In the fall of 1859, he traveled south, and spent a year in St. Tammany Parish, Louisiana. In 1860, he entered a select school in candor to finish his education, but the next year went to fight in the American Civil War instead. He was commissioned as a first lieutenant in the 26th New York Volunteers, and in 1862 as a captain in the 137th New York Volunteers. He was severely wounded during the Battle of Gettysburg, and resigned his commission in November 1864. In 1867, he married Mary Markell, and they had four children.

He graduated from Albany Law School in 1868, and was admitted to the bar. Looking for a place to practice law, he engaged instead in the black walnut lumber business in Missouri and Illinois; then grew oranges in Florida; then was a merchant in the Red River Valley; and finally became a lumberman on the shores of Lake Superior. In 1876, he returned home and purchased the Candor Woolen Mills where he manufactured horse blankets.

He was Supervisor of the Town of Candor in 1879; a member of the New York State Assembly (Tioga Co.) in 1884 and 1885; and a member of the New York State Senate (26th D.) in 1886 and 1887.

== Sources ==
- The New York Red Book compiled by Edgar L. Murlin (published by James B. Lyon, Albany NY, 1897; pg. 403 and 503f)
- Biographical sketches of the members of the Legislature in The Evening Journal Almanac] (1887)
- 137th New York Volunteers
- Bio in Gazetteer of Tompkins County (pg. 171ff)

New York State Assembly
Preceded by Myron B. Ferris	New York State Assembly; Tioga County; 1884–1885	Succeeded by Adolphus G. Allen
New York State Senate
Preceded by Edward S. Esty	New York State Senate; 26th District; 1886–1887	Succeeded by William L. Sweet
