= Simeon S. Hawkins =

American politician from New York

Simeon Smith Hawkins (March 30, 1827 Stony Brook, Suffolk County, New York – January 23, 1908 Riverhead, Suffolk Co., NY) was an American manufacturer and politician from New York.

== Life ==
He was the son of Daniel Shaler Hawkins (1798–1868) and Sophia (Smith) Hawkins (1802–1841). He became a commander in the U.S. Navy, and was captain of the bark Hannibal during the American Civil War. In 1870, he began the manufacture of fish meal and fish oil from menhadens.

He was Superintendent of the Poor of Suffolk County from 1866 to 1869; Supervisor of the Town of Riverhead in 1870; a delegate to the 1880 Republican National Convention; a member of the New York State Assembly (Suffolk Co.) in 1884 and 1885; and a member of the New York State Senate (1st D.) in 1888 and 1889. In November 1889, he was defeated for re-election by his brother Edward Hawkins who ran on the Democratic ticket.

Simeon S. Hawkins died on January 23, 1908, at his home in Riverhead, of "paralysis".

== Sources ==
- The New York Red Book compiled by Edgar L. Murlin (published by James B. Lyon, Albany NY, 1897; pg. 403 and 503f)
- Biographical sketches of the members of the Legislature in The Evening Journal Almanac (1888)
- Simeon S. Hawkins at Sweezey Genealogy

New York State Assembly
Preceded by Edwin Bailey	New York State Assembly; Suffolk County; 1884–1885	Succeeded by Henry E. Huntting
New York State Senate
Preceded by Edward F. Fagan	New York State Senate; 1st District; 1888–1889	Succeeded by Edward Hawkins
