= Fremont Cole =

American politician

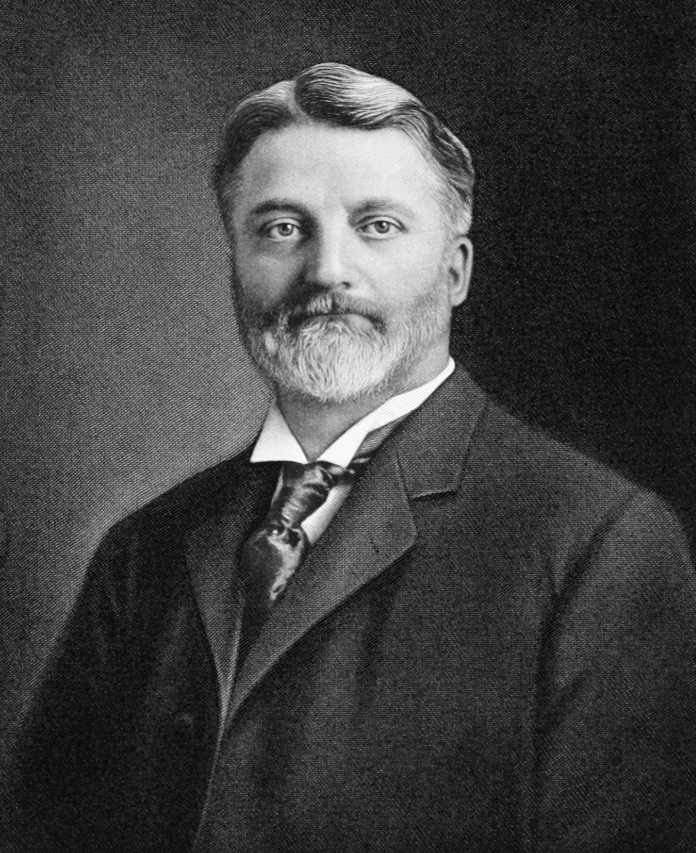

Speaker of the New York State Assembly
- In office 1888–1889

Member of the New York State Assembly
- In office 1885–1889
- Constituency: Schuyler County

Personal details
- Born: September 18, 1856 Covert, New York, US
- Died: November 15, 1915 (aged 59) Little Neck, New York, US
- Party: Republican
- Spouse: Charlotte Roberts (m. 1888)
- Occupation: Lawyer, politician

Fremont Cole (September 18, 1856 – November 15, 1915) was an American lawyer and politician.

== Life ==
Fremont Cole was born in Covert, New York on September 18, 1856, the son of Ira H. Cole, a farmer. In 1876, he moved to Watkins in Schuyler County. Here he studied law in the office of O. P. Hurd, then Surrogate of Schuyler County. He was admitted to the bar, and became Clerk of the Surrogate Court. Five years later he opened his own law firm with his brother Irving N. Cole, which he dissolved in 1890 when he moved to Washington.

He was a member of the New York State Assembly (Schuyler Co.) in 1885, 1886, 1887, 1888 and 1889; and was Speaker in 1888 and 1889. In October 1889, he was defeated by Charles T. Saxton in his quest for the Republican nomination to run for the New York State Senate in the 29th District.

In October 1888, he married Charlotte Roberts (1863–1943).

He died at his home in Little Neck, Queens on November 15, 1915, and was buried at Glenwood Cemetery in Watkins (now Watkins Glen), N.Y.

New York State Assembly
Preceded by J. Franklin Barnes	New York State Assembly; Schuyler County; 1885-1889	Succeeded by Charles T. Willis
Political offices
Preceded by James W. Husted	Speaker of the New York State Assembly; 1888–1889	Succeeded by James W. Husted
