= John J. Linson =

American politician

John James Linson (November 29, 1850 Mongaup Valley, Sullivan County, New York – August 2, 1915 Kingston, Ulster County, New York) was an American lawyer and politician from New York.

== Life ==
He attended Monticello Academy and Albany Normal School. Then he studied law with Archibald C. Niven, and was admitted to the bar in 1872. In 1876, he removed to Kingston, and practiced law there.

He was Corporation Counsel of the City of Kingston from 1883 to 1887; and a member of the New York State Senate (14th D.) from 1888 to 1891, sitting in the 111th, 112th, 113th and 114th New York State Legislatures.

== Sources ==
- The New York Red Book compiled by Edgar L. Murlin (published by James B. Lyon, Albany NY, 1897; pg. 403)
- Biographical sketches of the members of the Legislature in The Evening Journal Almanac (1891)
- Ex-Senator John J. Linson in NYT on August 3, 1915

New York State Senate
Preceded by Henry C. Connelly	New York State Senate; 14th District; 1888–1891	Succeeded by Clarence E. Bloodgood
