= William H. Robertson =

American lawyer and politician (1823–1898)

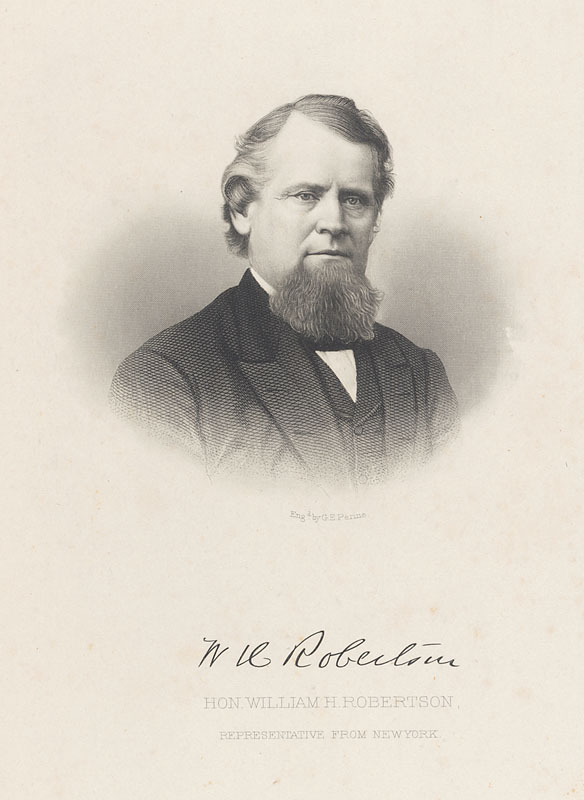
- Robertson in the 1860s

Collector of the Port of New York
- In office 1881–1885
- Preceded by: Edwin A. Merritt
- Succeeded by: Edward L. Hedden

Member of the New York Senate from the 12th district
- In office 1888–1891
- Preceded by: Henry C. Nelson
- Succeeded by: Charles P. McClelland

Member of the New York Senate from the 12th district
- In office 1880–1881
- Preceded by: Charles Hughes
- Succeeded by: Henry C. Nelson

Member of the New York Senate from the 9th district
- In office 1872–1879
- Preceded by: William Cauldwell
- Succeeded by: Francis M. Bixby

Member of the New York Senate from the 7th district
- In office 1854–1855
- Preceded by: Abraham B. Conger
- Succeeded by: John W. Ferdon

Member of the New York State Assembly from the Westchester County, 1st district
- In office 1849–1850
- Preceded by: Richard M. Underhill
- Succeeded by: Daniel Clark Briggs

Judge of the Westchester County Court
- In office 1856–1866

President pro tempore of the New York State Senate
- In office 1874–1881
- Preceded by: William B. Woodin
- Succeeded by: Dennis McCarthy

Member of the U.S. House of Representatives from New York's 10th district
- In office March 4, 1867 – March 3, 1869
- Preceded by: William Radford
- Succeeded by: Clarkson N. Potter

Personal details
- Born: October 10, 1823 Bedford, New York, U.S.
- Died: December 6, 1898 (aged 75) Katonah, New York, U.S.
- Party: Whig (before 1855); Republican (after 1855)
- Spouse: Mary Elizabeth Ballard
- Parent: Henry Robertson (father)
- Occupation: Lawyer, politician
- Known for: Half-Breed faction leader; appointment as Collector of the Port of New York sparked Stalwart–Half-Breed feud

William Henry Robertson (October 10, 1823 – December 6, 1898), also known as W. H. Robertson, was an American lawyer and politician from New York. He served in the New York State Assembly, the New York State Senate, and the United States House of Representatives, and was later appointed Collector of the Port of New York by President James A. Garfield. His appointment sparked a major feud between the Half-Breed and Stalwart factions of the Republican Party.

Robertson allied with the GOP Half-Breed faction, which supported moderate civil service reform and emphasized protectionist tariffs and industrial growth.

== Early life and legal career ==
Robertson was born on October 10, 1823, in Bedford, Westchester County, New York, the son of Henry Robertson (d. 1881). He received an academic education, attended the common schools and Bedford Union Academy, studied law, and began practice in his native town.

== Political and judicial career ==
Robertson was a Whig member of the New York State Assembly (Westchester County, 1st District) in 1849 and 1850.

He was a member of the New York State Senate (7th District) in 1854 and 1855.

He served as Judge of the Westchester County Court from 1856 to 1866.

He joined the Republican Party upon its organization in 1855 and was a presidential elector in 1860, voting for Abraham Lincoln and Hannibal Hamlin.

== U.S. Congress ==
Robertson was elected as a Republican to the 40th United States Congress, representing New York's 10th congressional district, and served from March 4, 1867, to March 3, 1869.

== Return to the State Senate ==
He was again a member of the State Senate from 1872 to 1881, sitting in the 95th through 104th legislatures. He represented the 9th District from 1872 to 1879 and the 12th District from 1880 to 1881.

In 1874, after a constitutional amendment created it as a standing office, he was chosen President pro tempore of the New York State Senate. He remained in this post until his retirement from the Senate in May 1881 upon his federal appointment.

== Collector of the Port of New York and the Stalwart–Half-Breed feud ==
In 1881, Robertson was appointed Collector of the Port of New York by President James A. Garfield, whose nomination he had helped to secure by leading a part of the New York delegation at the 1880 Republican National Convention to shift their support from Grant.

Robertson's nomination to the collectorship, made without consulting the two Republican U.S. Senators, Roscoe Conkling and Thomas C. Platt, and, according to their claims, in violation of the President's pledge, led to the resignation of the two senators and resulted in a serious party split. In the bitter struggle between the Stalwart and the Half-Breed factions which followed, Robertson was active in the campaign that resulted in the election of new senators in the place of Conkling and Platt.

Robertson was a delegate to the 1884 Republican National Convention and held the collectorship until 1885.

== Later career ==
After leaving the collectorship, Robertson resumed his law practice.

He was again a member of the State Senate (12th District) from 1888 to 1891, sitting in the 111th, 112th, 113th, and 114th legislatures.

== Death ==
Robertson died on December 6, 1898, in Katonah, New York, at the age of 75.

== Sources ==
New York State Assembly
Preceded by Richard M. Underhill	New York State Assembly; Westchester County, 1st District; 1849–1850	Succeeded by Daniel Clark Briggs
New York State Senate
Preceded by Abraham B. Conger	New York State Senate; 7th District; 1854–1855	Succeeded by John W. Ferdon
Preceded by William Cauldwell	New York State Senate; 9th District; 1872–1879	Succeeded by Francis M. Bixby
Preceded by Charles Hughes	New York State Senate; 12th District; 1880–1881	Succeeded by Henry C. Nelson
U.S. House of Representatives
Preceded by William Radford	Member of the U.S. House of Representatives from New York's 10th congressional district 1867–1869	Succeeded by Clarkson N. Potter
Political offices
Preceded by William B. Woodin	President pro tempore of the New York State Senate; 1874–1881	Succeeded by Dennis McCarthy
Government offices
Preceded by Edwin A. Merritt	Collector of the Port of New York; 1881–1885	Succeeded by Edward L. Hedden
New York State Senate
Preceded by Henry C. Nelson	New York State Senate; 12th District; 1888–1891	Succeeded by Charles P. McClelland
