= John T. Gorman =

American politician

John Thomas Gorman (October 20, 1856 – May 1, 1926) was an American businessman and politician from New York.

== Life ==
Gorman was born on October 20, 1856, in Brooklyn, New York, to Irish-American parents. He moved to Cohoes when he was young.

Gorman initially conducted a market in the city. He then became the local manager for Armour and Company, later taking charge of their Saratoga Spa branch. He also worked in the wholesale grocery and produce business. He also worked as a hotel keeper. He was in the New York National Guard, and was a volunteer fireman in the Howard Engine Company and was president of Steamer No. 3.

In 1886, Gorman was elected to the New York State Assembly as a Democrat, representing the Albany County 4th District. He served in the Assembly in 1887, 1888, 1891, and 1892. He was later appointed state conservation commissioner under Governor William Sulzer. In 1918, he was appointed commissioner of public works for Cohoes.

Gorman was married to Hannah McMahon. His children were James W., Nora A., Laura M., and Dorothy C. He was a member of the Benevolent and Protective Order of Elks, the Holy Name Society, and the Exempt Fireman's Association.

Gorman died at home on May 1, 1926. He was buried in St. Agnes Cemetery.

New York State Assembly
Preceded by Terence I. Hardin	New York State Assembly; Albany County, 4th District; 1887-1888	Succeeded by William B. Le Roy
Preceded by William B. Le Roy	New York State Assembly; Albany County, 4th District; 1891-1892	Succeeded by George S. Rivenburgh
