= Henry C. Nelson =

American politician

Henry Clay Nelson (July 29, 1836 - April 17, 1909) was an American lawyer and politician from New York.

== Life ==
Henry Clay Nelson was born on July 29, 1836, in Bedford, Westchester County, New York.

He was a member of the New York State Assembly (Westchester Co., 3rd D.) in 1868. He was Warden of Sing Sing State Prison from 1869 to 1870, and from 1872 to 1873.

He was a member of the New York State Senate (12th D.) from 1882 to 1887, sitting in the 105th, 106th, 107th, 108th, 109th and 110th New York State Legislatures.

== Sources ==
- Civil List and Constitutional History of the Colony and State of New York compiled by Edgar Albert Werner (1884; pg. 291 and 370)
- Manual of Westchester County, Past and Present by Henry Townsend Smith (1912; pg. 256)

New York State Assembly
Preceded by David W. Travis	New York State Assembly; Westchester County, 3rd District; 1868	Succeeded by James W. Husted
New York State Senate
Preceded by William H. Robertson	New York State Senate; 12th District; 1882–1887	Succeeded by William H. Robertson
