= William L. Sweet =

American politician

William L. Sweet (October 25, 1850, in Waterloo, Seneca County, New York – August 4, 1931, in Waterloo, Seneca Co., NY) was an American politician from New York.

== Life ==
He was the son of Abram Sweet and Charlotte (Cook) Sweet. He graduated from Cazenovia Seminary in 1867. Then he became a merchant, trading in produce, grains and flour. On June 4, 1874, he married Mary Asenath Cook (1852–1937), and they had several children, among them Cdr. George Cook Sweet NC (1877–1953).

Sweet was President of the Board of Education of Waterloo in 1884; President of the Village of Waterloo in 1885 and 1886; a member of the New York State Assembly (Seneca Co.) in 1887; and a member of the New York State Senate (26th D.) in 1888 and 1889.

== Sources ==
- The New York Red Book compiled by Edgar L. Murlin (published by James B. Lyon, Albany NY, 1897; pg. 403 and 506)
- Biographical sketches of the members of the Legislature in The Evening Journal Almanac (1888)
- Pioneer and Patriot: George Cook Sweet, Commander, U.S.N., 1877-1953: A Biography by Lillian C. White (1963)

New York State Assembly
Preceded by Stephen Duncan Leverich	New York State Assembly; Seneca County; 1887	Succeeded by James M. Martin
New York State Senate
Preceded by Charles F. Barager	New York State Senate; 26th District; 1888–1889	Succeeded by Thomas Hunter
