= 108th New York State Legislature =

New York state legislative session

←	107th	109th	→
- New York State Capitol (2009)

Overview
- Legislative body: New York State Legislature
- Jurisdiction: New York, United States
- Term: January 1 – December 31, 1885

Senate
- Members: 32
- President: vacant
- Temporary President: Dennis McCarthy (R)
- Party control: Republican (19-13)

Assembly
- Members: 128
- Speaker: George Z. Erwin (R)
- Party control: Republican (73-55)

Sessions
- 1st: January 6 – May 15, 1885
- 2nd: May 15 – 22, 1885

The 108th New York State Legislature, consisting of the New York State Senate and the New York State Assembly, met from January 6 to May 22, 1885, during the first year of David B. Hill's governorship, in Albany.

== Background ==
Under the provisions of the New York Constitution of 1846, 32 Senators and 128 assemblymen were elected in single-seat districts; senators for a two-year term, assemblymen for a one-year term. The senatorial districts were made up of entire counties, except New York County (seven districts) and Kings County (three districts). The Assembly districts were made up of entire towns, or city wards, forming a contiguous area, all within the same county.

At this time there were two major political parties: the Democratic Party and the Republican Party. In New York City the Democrats were split into three factions: Tammany Hall, "Irving Hall" and the "County Democrats". The Prohibition Party; and a fusion of the Greenback Party, the Anti-Monopoly Party and the "People's Party", also nominated tickets.

== Elections ==
The 1884 New York state election was held on November 4. Governor Grover Cleveland was elected President of the United States. The only two statewide elective offices up for election were two judgeships on the New York Court of Appeals, which were carried by the two cross-endorsed incumbents, one Democrats and one Republican.

== Sessions ==
The Legislature met for the regular session at the State Capitol in Albany on January 6, 1885; and adjourned on May 15.

On January 6, Gov. Grover Cleveland resigned, and Lt. Gov. David B. Hill succeeded to the office.

George Z. Erwin (R) was elected Speaker with 72 votes against 51 for William Caryl Ely (D).

On January 20, the Legislature elected William M. Evarts (R) to succeed Elbridge G. Lapham (R) as U.S. Senator from New York, for a six-year term beginning on March 4, 1885.

On May 15, the Legislature adjourned. While the members were exchanging farewells, copies of Gov. Hill's proclamation for a special session, to convene on the same day at 4 p.m., were delivered to the clerks of the Senate and the Assembly. The special session was called to consider again — Hill had vetoed a census bill during the regular session — action to be taken concerning the decennial enumeration which, under the Constitution, was due in 1885. In his message to the Legislature, Hill stated that the Constitution required an "enumeration", but not a "census". No enumeration or census bill was passed until 1891.

== State Senate ==
=== Districts ===
- 1st District: Queens and Suffolk counties
- 2nd District: 1st, 2nd, 5th, 6th, 8th, 9th, 10th, 12th and 22nd Ward of the City of Brooklyn, and the towns of Flatbush, Gravesend and New Utrecht in Kings County
- 3rd District: 3rd, 4th, 7th, 11th, 13th, 19th, 20th, 21st and 23rd Ward of the City of Brooklyn
- 4th District: 14th, 15th, 16th, 17th, 18th, 24th and 25th Ward of the City of Brooklyn, and the towns of New Lots and Flatlands in Kings County
- 5th District: Richmond County and the 1st, 2nd, 3rd, 5th, 6th, 8th, 14th and parts of the 4th and 9th Ward of New York City
- 6th District: 7th, 11th, 13th and part of the 4th Ward of NYC
- 7th District: 10th, 17th and part of the 15th, 18th and 21st Ward of NYC
- 8th District: 16th and part of the 9th, 15th, 18th, 20th and 21st Ward of NYC
- 9th District: Part of the 18th, 19th and 21st Ward of NYC
- 10th District: Part of the 12th, 19th, 20th, 21st and 22nd Ward of NYC
- 11th District: 23rd and 24th, and part of the 12th, 20th and 22nd Ward of NYC
- 12th District: Rockland and Westchester counties
- 13th District: Orange and Sullivan counties
- 14th District: Greene, Schoharie and Ulster counties
- 15th District: Columbia, Dutchess and Putnam counties
- 16th District: Rensselaer and Washington counties
- 17th District: Albany County
- 18th District: Fulton, Hamilton, Montgomery, Saratoga and Schenectady counties
- 19th District: Clinton, Essex and Warren counties
- 20th District: Franklin, Lewis and St. Lawrence counties
- 21st District: Oswego and Jefferson counties
- 22nd District: Oneida County
- 23rd District: Herkimer, Madison and Otsego counties
- 24th District: Chenango, Delaware and Broome counties
- 25th District: Onondaga and Cortland counties
- 26th District: Cayuga, Seneca, Tompkins and Tioga counties
- 27th District: Allegany, Chemung and Steuben counties
- 28th District: Ontario, Schuyler, Wayne and Yates counties
- 29th District: Monroe and Orleans counties
- 30th District: Genesee, Livingston, Niagara and Wyoming counties
- 31st District: Erie County
- 32nd District: Cattaraugus and Chautauqua counties

Note: There are now 62 counties in the State of New York. The counties which are not mentioned in this list had not yet been established, or sufficiently organized, the area being included in one or more of the abovementioned counties.

=== Members ===
The asterisk (*) denotes members of the previous Legislature who continued in office as members of this Legislature.

District	Senator	Party	Notes
1st	James Otis*	Republican	
2nd	John J. Kiernan*	Democrat	
3rd	Albert Daggett*	Republican	
4th	John C. Jacobs*	Democrat	
5th	Michael C. Murphy*	County/Irv. H. Dem.	
6th	Timothy J. Campbell*	County/Irv. H. Dem.	on November 3, 1885, elected to the 49th U.S. Congress
7th	James Daly*	County Dem.	
8th	Frederick S. Gibbs*	Republican	
9th	John J. Cullen*	Tammany Dem.	
10th	J. Hampden Robb*	Democrat	
11th	George W. Plunkitt*	Tammany Dem.	
12th	Henry C. Nelson*	Democrat	
13th	Henry R. Low*	Republican	
14th	John Van Schaick*	Democrat	
15th	Thomas Newbold*	Democrat	
16th	Albert C. Comstock*	Republican	
17th	John B. Thacher*	Democrat	
18th	James Arkell*	Republican	
19th	Shepard P. Bowen*	Republican	
20th	John I. Gilbert*	Republican	
21st	Frederick Lansing*	Republican	
22nd	Henry J. Coggeshall*	Republican	
23rd	Andrew Davidson*	Republican	
24th	Edward B. Thomas*	Republican	
25th	Dennis McCarthy*	Republican	President pro tempore
26th	Edward S. Esty*	Republican	
27th	J. Sloat Fassett*	Republican	
28th	Thomas Robinson*	Republican	
29th	Charles S. Baker*	Republican	on November 4, 1884, elected to the 49th U.S. Congress
30th	Timothy E. Ellsworth*	Republican	
31st	Robert C. Titus*	Democrat	
32nd	Commodore P. Vedder*	Republican	

=== Employees ===
- Clerk: John W. Vrooman
- Sergeant-at-Arms: George A. Goss
- Doorkeeper: David W. Bogert
- Stenographer: Hudson C. Tanner
- Postmaster: A. E. Darrow
- Janitor: A. L. Neidick
- Chaplain: S. V. Leech

== State Assembly ==
=== Assemblymen ===
The asterisk (*) denotes members of the previous Legislature who continued as members of this Legislature.

District		Assemblymen	Party	Notes
Albany	1st	Stephen H. Niles	Democrat	
Albany	2nd	Lansing Hotaling	Republican	
Albany	3rd	Patrick Murray	Democrat	
Albany	4th	Terence I. Hardin	Democrat	
Allegany		William R. McEwen	Republican	
Broome		William H. Olin*	Republican	
Cattaraugus	1st	Frederick W. Kruse*	Republican	
Cattaraugus	2nd	Eugene A. Nash*	Republican	
Cayuga	1st	Willoughby B. Priddy*	Republican	
Cayuga	2nd	Michael B. Van Buskirk	Republican	
Chautauqua	1st	Dana P. Horton*	Republican	
Chautauqua	2nd	Julien T. Williams	Republican	
Chemung		Jonas S. Van Duzer*	Republican	
Chenango		George B. Whitmore	Republican	
Clinton		George W. Palmer	Republican	
Columbia		John C. Hogeboom	Republican	
Cortland		Harlan P. Andrews	Republican	
Delaware		Silas S. Cartwright*	Republican	
Dutchess	1st	Joseph H. Storm	Republican	
Dutchess	2nd	Edward B. Osborne*	Democrat	
Erie	1st	William F. Sheehan	Democrat	
Erie	2nd	Frank M. Giese	Democrat	
Erie	3rd	William M. Hawkins	Republican	
Erie	4th	Timothy W. Jackson*	Democrat	
Erie	5th	Amos H. Baker	Republican	
Essex		Wesley Barnes	Republican	
Franklin		William T. O'Neil*	Republican	
Fulton and Hamilton		Alden W. Berry	Republican	
Genesee		Lucien R. Bailey*	Republican	
Greene		Stephen T. Hopkins	Republican	
Herkimer		John M. Budlong	Republican	
Jefferson	1st	Allen E. Kilby	Republican	
Jefferson	2nd	Eli J. Seeber*	Republican	
Kings	1st	Moses J. Wafer	Democrat	
Kings	2nd	Richard Nagle*	Democrat	
Kings	3rd	Peter K. McCann	Democrat	
Kings	4th	Henry F. Haggerty	Democrat	
Kings	5th	Michael J. Coffey*	Democrat	
Kings	6th	Thomas F. Farrell*	Democrat	
Kings	7th	George H. Lindsay*	Democrat	
Kings	8th	Robert E. Connelly	Democrat	
Kings	9th	Lewis A. Myers	Republican	
Kings	10th	James Taylor*	Republican	
Kings	11th	Henry Heath*	Republican	
Kings	12th	Mortimer C. Earl*	Democrat	
Lewis		G. Henry P. Gould	Democrat	
Livingston		Kidder M. Scott*	Republican	
Madison		Edward F. Haskell*	Republican	
Monroe	1st	Walter S. Hubbell*	Republican	
Monroe	2nd	James P. Tumilty	Democrat	unsuccessfully contested by Charles W. Voshall (R)
Monroe	3rd	Philip Garbutt*	Republican	
Montgomery		Thomas Liddle	Republican	
New York	1st	Daniel E. Finn	Irving H. Dem.	
New York	2nd	James Oliver*	Democrat	
New York	3rd	Charles Eiseman	Tammany Dem.	
New York	4th	Patrick H. Roche*	Democrat	
New York	5th	Michael Brennan	County/Irv. H. Dem.	
New York	6th	Edward F. Reilly	Tammany Dem.	
New York	7th	Lucas L. Van Allen*	Republican	
New York	8th	Charles Smith*	Republican	
New York	9th	John P. Rockefeller	Republican	
New York	10th	George F. Roesch	County/Irv. H. Dem.	
New York	11th	Walter Howe*	Republican	
New York	12th	Solomon D. Rosenthal*	County/Irv. H. Dem.	
New York	13th	John P. Windolph	Republican	
New York	14th	Jacob Kunzenman	County Dem.	
New York	15th	John B. McGoldrick	Tammany Dem.	
New York	16th	Edward P. Hagan	County Dem.	
New York	17th	John H. O'Hara	Democrat	
New York	18th	John F. Kenny	County/Irv. H. Dem.	
New York	19th	Eugene S. Ives	Democrat	
New York	20th	James Haggerty*	Tammany Dem.	
New York	21st	Henry A. Barnum	Republican	
New York	22nd	Joseph L. Gerety	County/Irv. H. Dem.	
New York	23rd	Jacob A. Cantor	Tammany Dem.	
New York	24th	John B. Shea	County/Irv. H. Dem.	
Niagara	1st	Jacob A. Driess*	Democrat	
Niagara	2nd	Walter P. Horne	Democrat	
Oneida	1st	Henry A. Steber	Labor Reform/Rep.	
Oneida	2nd	Lewis B. Sherman	Dem./Labor Reform	
Oneida	3rd	T. James Owens*	Republican	
Onondaga	1st	Wallace Tappan	Republican	
Onondaga	2nd	Francis Hendricks*	Republican	
Onondaga	3rd	Conrad Shoemaker*	Republican	
Ontario		John Raines	Republican	
Orange	1st	Samuel L. Carlisle	Republican	
Orange	2nd	George W. Greene	Democrat	
Orleans		J. Marshall Dibble*	Republican	
Oswego	1st	Henry C. Howe	Republican	
Oswego	2nd	Gouverneur M. Sweet*	Republican	
Otsego	1st	William Caryl Ely*	Democrat	Minority Leader
Otsego	2nd	Frank B. Arnold	Republican	
Putnam		Robert A. Livingston	Republican	
Queens	1st	Louis K. Church*	Democrat	
Queens	2nd	Thomas Allen Smith	Republican	
Rensselaer	1st	James P. Hooley*	Dem./Labor Reform	
Rensselaer	2nd	Eugene L. Demers	Republican	
Rensselaer	3rd	Charles C. Lodewick	Democrat	
Richmond		Michael S. Tynan	Republican	
Rockland		John W. Felter*	Democrat	
St. Lawrence	1st	N. Martin Curtis*	Republican	
St. Lawrence	2nd	Andrew Tuck	Rep./Proh.	
St. Lawrence	3rd	George Z. Erwin*	Republican	elected Speaker
Saratoga	1st	Daniel C. Briggs*	Republican	
Saratoga	2nd	Bartlett B. Grippin	Republican	
Schenectady		Edward D. Cutler	Democrat	
Schoharie		Addison H. Bartley	Democrat	
Schuyler		Fremont Cole	Republican	
Seneca		William B. Clark	Democrat	
Steuben	1st	George E. Whiteman*	Democrat	
Steuben	2nd	Charles D. Baker	Republican	
Suffolk		Simeon S. Hawkins*	Republican	
Sullivan		James D. Decker	Democrat	
Tioga		Charles F. Barager*	Republican	
Tompkins		Hiland K. Clark	Republican	
Ulster	1st	Robert A. Snyder	Republican	
Ulster	2nd	Gilbert D. B. Hasbrouck*	Republican	
Ulster	3rd	Cornelius A. J. Hardenbergh	Democrat	
Warren		Frank Bryne	Democrat	
Washington	1st	George Scott	Republican	
Washington	2nd	Charles K. Baker*	Republican	
Wayne	1st	Ammon S. Farnum*	Republican	
Wayne	2nd	Edwin K. Burnham	Democrat	
Westchester	1st	Charles P. McClelland	Democrat	
Westchester	2nd	Samuel W. Johnson*	Democrat	
Westchester	3rd	James W. Husted*	Republican	
Wyoming		John E. Lowing	Republican	
Yates		Clark E. Smith	Republican	

=== Employees ===
- Clerk: Charles A. Chickering
- Sergeant-at-Arms: Edward H. Talbott
- Doorkeeper: Michael Maher
- Assistant Doorkeeper: Herman K. Fox
- Assistant Doorkeeper: John Christie
- Stenographer: Emory P. Close

== Sources ==
- The New York Red Book compiled by Edgar L. Murlin (published by James B. Lyon, Albany NY, 1897; see pg. 384f for senate districts; pg. 403 for senators; pg. 410–417 for Assembly districts; and pg. 504 for assemblymen)
- Biographical sketches of the Members of the Legislature in The Evening Journal Almanac (1885) [e-book]
- ERWIN DEFEATS HUBBELL in NYT on January 6, 1885
