= Francis M. Bixby =

American politician

Francis Mather Bixby (December 20, 1828 – March 4, 1905) was an American politician from New York.

== Life ==
He was the son of Ira Bixby (1803–1835) and Caroline (Mather) Bixby (1807–1890), a sister of Canal Commissioner John C. Mather (1813–1882).

Bixby was a member of the New York State Senate (8th D.) in 1876 and 1877.

He was again a member of the State Senate (9th D.) in 1880 and 1881.

He died on March 4, 1905.

== Sources ==
- Civil List and Constitutional History of the Colony and State of New York compiled by Edgar Albert Werner (1884; pg. 291)
- OBITUARY; CAROLINE M. BIXBY in NYT on November 13, 1890
- Mather genealogy

New York State Senate
Preceded by Hugh H. Moore	New York State Senate; 8th District; 1876–1877	Succeeded by Thomas C. E. Ecclesine
Preceded by William H. Robertson	New York State Senate; 9th District; 1880–1881	Succeeded by James Fitzgerald
