= Charles A. Stadler =

American politician

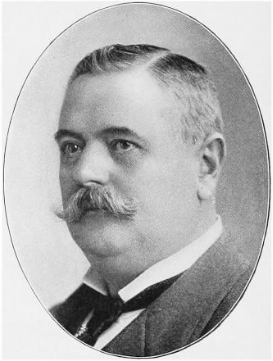

Member of the New York State Senate
- In office 1888–1891

Personal details
- Born: Charles Albert Stadler; July 15, 1848 Germersheim, Kingdom of Bavaria
- Died: May 3, 1928 (aged 79) Fort Myers, Florida, US
- Spouses: Josephine Contes (m. 1866; died 1883) Pauline Roesicke (m. 1888)
- Occupation: Brewer, politician

Charles Albert Stadler (July 15, 1848 – May 3, 1928) was an American politician from New York.

== Life ==
He was the son of Gabriel Stadler (1811 – c. 1876) and Katharina Margarethe (Nett) Stadler (1808–1886). Gabriel Stadler was an inn-keeper in Germersheim, and took part in the failed German Revolution of 1848. The family emigrated to the United States in 1851, and settled in New York City where Gabriel became an engraver.

Charles attended the St. Nicholas Parochial School, other public schools, and De La Salle Institute. During the American Civil War, he fought with the 55th New York Volunteers, and finished the war as a sergeant major. On July 17, 1866, he married Josephine Contes (1848–1883), and they had eight children. He became an engraver and worked in his father's shop until 1871. Then he became a brewer and later engaged in the malting business, building the largest malting company in the United States.

He was an Inspector of Public Schools from 1877 to 1879; and was a member of the New York State Senate (9th D.) from 1888 to 1891, sitting in the 111th, 112th, 113th and 114th New York State Legislatures. On June 21, 1888, he married Pauline Roesicke (born 1866).

In 1897, his malting business became part of the American Malting Company, and Stadler was President of the company from 1900 to 1916. In 1903, he proposed to deactivate the Erie Canal, and use the right-of-way of the canal bed to lay railroad tracks instead, and then ship freight (especially his grains and malts) by rail. Besides being faster than the canal boats, the rail transport would work all year round, while the canals were closed during the winter when the water froze.

During his last years, he spent the winters at "Seminole Grove", an estate with an extensive game preserve and fruit orchards, near Fort Myers, Florida, and died there on May 3, 1928.

New York State Senate
Preceded by John J. Cullen	New York State Senate; 9th District; 1888–1891	Succeeded by Edward P. Hagan
