= Alfred E. Stacey =

American businessman and politician (1846–1940)

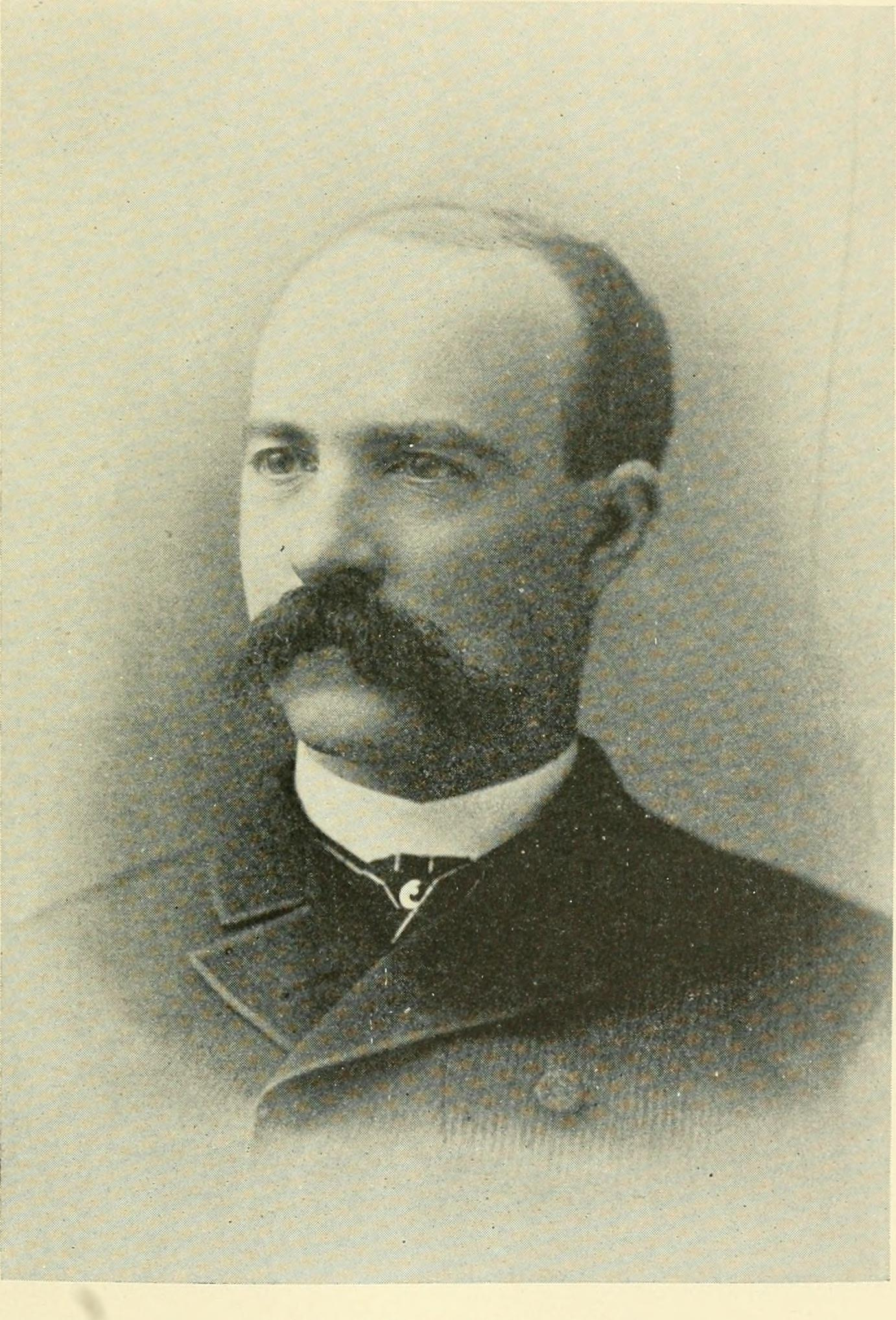
Hon. Alfred E. Stacey

Alfred Edwin Stacey (January 20, 1846 – March 10, 1940) was an American chair manufacturer, politician, and Commander-in-Chief of the Grand Army of the Republic.

== Life ==
Stacey was born on January 20, 1846, in Elbridge, New York, the son of Richard Stacey and Agnes Pierce. His parents were English immigrants from Somersetshire.

Stacey attended the Munro Collegiate Institute until his father's death in 1863. He then briefly worked as a clerk for the merchant firm A. Wood & Sons. He resigned from the firm to enlist in the 9th New York Heavy Artillery Regiment, Battery L, during the American Civil War. Three of his brothers also enlisted during the war, two of them in the same Battery as him. The brothers were with Sheridan in Cedar Creek, where he received two gunshot wounds, and then with General Grant in Petersburg and Appomattox. He served until the end of the war.

After being discharged, Stacey again went to Munro Collegiate Institute, and then worked as a clerk. In 1869, he formed a copartnership with B. A. Wood, and the two purchased stock and interest from A. Wood & Sons. They worked together under the firm name A. E. Stacey & Co. until 1872, at which point Stacey worked on his own until 1884. In 1881, he bought the Rowe chair factory and continued manufacturing chairs. In 1884, he also bought the Sweet chair factory and consolidated the two. In 1888, he built a large factory for his business. In 1886, he bought a large flouring mill as well.

Stacey held several local offices, including village president. He served as postmaster of Elbridge from 1877 to 1885. In 1885, he was elected to the New York State Assembly as a Republican, representing the Onondaga County 2nd District. He served in the Assembly in 1886 and 1887.

Stacey eventually became president of the Elbridge Chair Company. On his 94th birthday, he gave the site of his old factory to serve as the village park. He also worked as a farmer. From 1902 to 1905, he was the County Treasurer.

Stacey was a charter member of the Grand Army of the Republic post in Elbridge, and was its last member. He was department commander of New York in 1920, and served as assistant adjutant general of New York in 1926 and from 1929 to 1935. In 1934, he was elected the Commander-in-Chief.

Stacey was a Methodist. He served as Past Noble Grand of the Odd Fellows. In 1871, he married Ellen Gorham. In 1883, he was married to his second wife, Jessie Rowe. His children were Mabel Cornelia, Maud Ellen, and Alfred E. Jr.

Stacey died at home of pneumonia on March 10, 1940. He was one of the last four Civil War veterans in Onondaga County. He was buried in Mount Pleasant Cemetery in Elbridge.

New York State Assembly
Preceded by Francis Hendricks	New York State Assembly; Onondaga County, 2nd District; 1886–1887	Succeeded by William H. Gallup
