= William Radford (politician) =

American politician

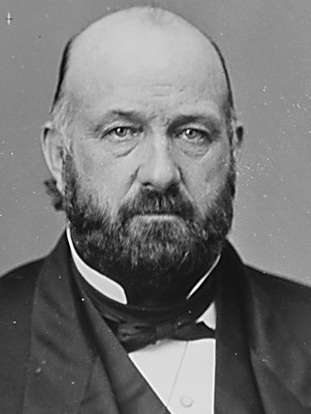

Member of the U.S. House of Representatives from New York's 10th district
- In office March 4, 1863 – March 3, 1867
- Preceded by: Charles Van Wyck
- Succeeded by: William Henry Robertson

Personal details
- Born: October 25, 1814 Poughkeepsie, New York, US
- Died: March 18, 1870 (aged 55) Yonkers, New York, US
- Resting place: Old Presbyterian Cemetery
- Party: Democratic

William Radford (June 24, 1814 – January 18, 1870) was a United States representative from New York during the latter half of the American Civil War and the beginning of Reconstruction, serving two terms from 1863 to 1867.

== Biography ==
Born in Poughkeepsie, Dutchess County, he received a limited schooling, moved to New York City in 1829, and engaged in mercantile pursuits.

=== Congress ===
Radford was elected as a Democrat to the Thirty-eighth and Thirty-ninth Congresses, holding office from March 4, 1863, to March 3, 1867. He was one of 14 House Democrats to vote in favor of the Thirteenth Amendment to the United States Constitution. He was an unsuccessful candidate for reelection in 1866 to the Fortieth Congress, after which he resumed his former business pursuits.

=== Death ===
Radford died in Yonkers, Westchester County in 1870 and was buried in the Old Presbyterian Cemetery, Westfield, Union County, New Jersey.

U.S. House of Representatives
Preceded by Charles Van Wyck	Member of the U.S. House of Representatives from New York's 10th congressional district March 4, 1863 – March 3, 1867	Succeeded by William Henry Robertson
