= Edward S. Esty =

American politician

Edward Selover Esty (July 17, 1824 – October 2, 1890) was an American politician from New York.

== Life ==
Edward S. Esty was born in Ithaca, New York on July 17, 1824, the son of Joseph Esty (born 1798) and Mary (Selover) Esty. He attended the common schools and Ithaca Academy. Then he engaged in farming and tanning. On May 12, 1846, he married Amelia Wilgus, and they had three children.

He was a member of the New York State Assembly (Tompkins Co.) in 1858.

He was President of the Board of Education of Ithaca from 1874 until his death; and Vice President of the First National Bank of Ithaca from 1883 until his death.

He was a member of the New York State Senate (26th D.) in 1884 and 1885.

He died on October 2, 1890, while on a visit in Boston, and was buried in Ithaca.

== Sources ==
- The New York Red Book compiled by Edgar L. Murlin (published by James B. Lyon, Albany NY, 1897; pg. 403 and 483)
- Biographical sketches of the Members of the Legislature in The Evening Journal Almanac (1885)
- TELEGRAPHIC BREVITIES; The funeral of Edward S. Esty, who died in Boston last week... in NYT on October 7, 1890
- Esty genealogy at RootsWeb
- Edward S. Esty at Tompkins County Gen Web

New York State Assembly
Preceded by Alexander Bower (1st D.); Elias W. Cady (2nd D.)	New York State Assembly; Tompkins County; 1858	Succeeded by William Woodbury
New York State Senate
Preceded by David H. Evans	New York State Senate; 26th District; 1884–1885	Succeeded by Charles F. Barager
