= Willard H. Mase =

American politician

Willard H. Mase (June 10, 1834 – January 18, 1894) was an American hat manufacturer, banker, and politician from New York.

== Life ==
Mase was born on June 10, 1834, in Prattsville, New York.

Mase moved to Matteawan at a young age, and he played a major role in the incorporation of the village. He served as village president for a number of years. He initially worked as a practical hatter, later becoming a wool and straw hat manufacturer. He was superintendent of the Matteawan Hat Manufacturing Co., president of the Matteawan Savings Bank, and manager of the Hudson River State Hospital in Poughkeepsie.

In 1886, Mase was elected to the New York State Assembly as a Republican, representing the Dutchess County 1st District. He served in the Assembly in 1887, 1888, 1889, 1890, and 1891.

Mase was an alternate delegate to the 1884 Republican National Convention and a delegate to the 1892 Republican National Convention. He was also elected delegate to the 1894 New York State Constitutional Convention, but he died before the convention began.

Mase died at Stanwix Hall in Albany on January 18, 1894. He was buried in Saint Luke's Church Cemetery in Beacon.

New York State Assembly
Preceded by Joseph H. Storm	New York State Assembly; Dutchess County, 1st District; 1887–1891	Succeeded by Obed Wheeler
