= Clarence E. Bloodgood =

American politician

Clarence Edelbert Bloodgood (February 3, 1849, in Jewett, Greene County, New York – August 25, 1921, in Catskill, Greene County, New York) was an American attorney and politician from New York.

== Life ==
Clarence was born on February 3, 1849, in Jewett, New York, son of Jason F. Bloodgood (1814–1906) and Lucinda H. Coe (1809–1893).

He attended Stamford Seminary in Stamford, Delaware County, from 1869 to 1871. In the fall of 1871, he began attending Yale University, from which he graduated in 1875 with a degree in Classics and honors. Among his classmates were Michigan Senator John Patton Jr. and Vermont Governor Edward Curtis Smith.

He began teaching before he started Yale, and in November 1875 he was elected as a Democrat to be school commissioner for the Greene County 1st District. He would hold this position for the next nine years.

In 1879, he began studying law under James B. Olney of Catskill, New York. After he was admitted to the bar in 1885, he began practicing law in Catskill. He originally had his own practice, but in 1897 he helped create the prominent law firm Bloodgood & Tallmadge. He joined the New York State Bar Association in 1892, serving as the vice-president for some years.

He was elected to the New York State Senate in 1891, where he represented the 14th District (Greene, Schoharie and Ulster counties). He served in the State Senate in 1892 and 1893.

He married Josephine L. Case (1855–1929) of Catskill on September 23, 1892. They had no children.

Clarence died in his Catskill home on August 25, 1921. He was buried in the Catskill Village Cemetery.

== Sources ==
- The New York Red Book. United States, Williams Press, 1892. Pp. 80.
- Biographical Review Volume XXXIII: Containing Life Sketches of Leading Citizens of Greene, Schoharie and Schenectady Counties, New York (Boston: Biographical Review Publishing Company, 1899). pp. 359–361.
- Recent Deaths and Funerals of Persons In This Vicinity: Clarence E. Bloodgood in The Kingston Daily News on August 26, 1921.
- Obituary Record of Graduates of Yale University. United States, Yale University, 1921. pp. 389–390.
- The Political Graveyard

New York State Senate
Preceded by John J. Linson	New York State Senate; 14th District; 1892–1893	Succeeded by Jacob A. Cantor
