= Jacob W. Hoysradt =

American politician

Jacob W. Hoysradt (March 8, 1824 Ancram, Columbia County, New York – November 15, 1890 Hudson, Columbia Co., NY) was an American manufacturer, banker and politician from New York.

== Life ==
He attended the public schools, and then began to work as a clerk in a store in Albany, and later in Kinderhook. In 1845, he was employed by C. C. Alger's iron works in Berkshire, Massachusetts. In 1850, Alger and Hoysradt opened the Hudson Iron Works in Hudson, New York, and Hoysradt worked there in different capacities, becoming General Manager in 1864, and President in 1868. He was also President of the Farmers National Bank of Hudson.

He was Mayor of Hudson from 1859 to 1860, and from 1867 to 1868; a delegate to the 1868, 1876 and 1880 Republican National Conventions; Postmaster of Hudson from 1869 to 1877; a member of the New York State Assembly (Columbia Co., 1st D.) in 1879; Paymaster General of the State Militia from 1880 to 1882; and a member of the New York State Senate (15th D.) in 1886 and 1887.

He died on November 15, 1890, at his home in Hudson, of Bright's disease.

== Sources ==
- The New York Civil List compiled by Franklin Benjamin Hough, Stephen C. Hutchins and Edgar Albert Werner (1870; pg. 558)
- The New York Red Book compiled by Edgar L. Murlin (published by James B. Lyon, Albany NY, 1897; pg. 403 and 499)
- The State Government for 1879 by Charles G. Shanks (Weed, Parsons & Co, Albany, 1879; pg. 110f)
- OBITUARY; GEN. JACOB W. HOYSRADT in NYT on November 16, 1890

New York State Assembly
Preceded by Jacob H. Proper	New York State Assembly; Columbia County, 1st District; 1879	Succeeded by John Elbert Gillette
New York State Senate
Preceded by Thomas Newbold	New York State Senate; 15th District; 1886–1887	Succeeded by Gilbert A. Deane
