= John B. Longley =

American lawyer and politician (1830–1892)

John B. Longley (June 23, 1830 – April 30, 1892) was an American lawyer and politician from New York.

== Life ==
Longley was born on June 23, 1830 in Providence, Rhode Island, the son of Samuel M. Longley and Lydia A. Fisk.

Longley moved to Hudson, New York in around 1844. He worked as a clerk in a dry goods store there for two years, after which he attended the Hudson Academy. He graduated from there in 1848. He was admitted to the bar in 1853, after which he worked as a lawyer in Hudson. He edited the newspaper Democratic Freeman from 1854 to 1855. He served as Police Justice of Hudson from 1863 to 1866, District Attorney of Columbia County from 1868 to 1870, Recorder from 1875 to 1876, and District Attorney again from 1878 to 1880. He moved to Brooklyn in 1881. He studied law in the office of future New York Supreme Court Justice Henry Hogeboom.

In 1884, Longley unsuccessfully ran for the New York State Assembly in the Kings County 10th District as a Democrat, losing to the Republican incumbent James Taylor. In 1885, he was successfully elected to the Assembly over Taylor. He served in the Assembly in 1886, 1887, 1888, and 1889. He then returned to his law practice. In 1890, he was appointed Secretary of the Quarantine Commission. He still held that office when he died. He was also a member of the Phalanx Club of the Twenty-second ward, the Twenty-second Democratic Club, and the Ward Association.

Longley briefly lived West as a young man, and while in La Crosse, Wisconsin he met Emma F. Tompkins. They married in 1856. Their children were Louis C. and Mrs. Edward Ridley. A second daughter died in 1889 at the age of sixteen. His brother was Levi F. Longley, the mayor of Hudson.

Eight months before his death, Longley began experiencing heart trouble, was diagnosed with a fatty degeneration of the heart, and was warned he had no more than four years to live. On April 30, 1892, while on his way to a meeting of the Twenty-second Ward Democratic Association, he felt faint and a policeman took him home. He died from heart disease within minutes of arriving there in the arms of his wife and daughter. His funeral was held at his home. Rev. Dr. Kelsey of the Sixth Avenue Baptist Church delivered the eulogy. His funeral was attended by, among other people, Quarantine Commissioner George W. Anderson, ex-judge John Delmar, Assemblyman Thomas F. Byrnes, Dr. Heard, Thomas Shaughnessy, L. M. Litchfield, Colonel John B. Meyenborg, Supervisor Dietsch, Daniel Ryan, F. H. Maguire, ex-Alderman Olena, Arthur Redley, Samuel Walker, Charles Vaughn, R. L. Haskins, John Rosenkrantz, Edward Elison, John Tompkins, and Quarantine Commissioner Allen. His remains were sent to Hudson, where he was buried in the family plot.

New York State Assembly
Preceded by James Taylor	New York State Assembly; Kings County, 10th District; 1886–1889	Succeeded by Thomas F. Byrnes
