= Edward C. Walker (New York politician) =

American politician

Edward Cyrus Walker (June 14, 1837 in Byron, Genesee County, New York – July 18, 1903 in Batavia, Genesee County, New York) was an American lawyer and politician from New York.

== Life ==
He was the son of Cyrus Walker (1799–1870) and Anna (Hulette) Walker (1799–1869). He attended the City Collegiate Institute in Oakfield, and Wilson Academy. On January 14, 1861, he married Martha Marsh, and they had two sons. He graduated from Genesee College in 1861. Then he attended Albany Law School, was admitted to the bar in 1862, and practiced in Batavia.

He was a member of the New York State Assembly (Genesee Co.) in 1869 and 1870.

He was a member of the New York State Senate (30th D.) from 1886 to 1889, sitting in the 109th, 110th, 111th and 112th New York State Legislatures.

He died on July 18, 1903, at his home in Batavia, after a long illness, and was buried at the Batavia Pioneer Cemetery.

== Sources ==
- The New York Red Book compiled by Edgar L. Murlin (published by James B. Lyon, Albany NY, 1897; pg. 403 and 491f)
- Life Sketches of Executive Officers, and Members of the Legislature of the State of New York, Vol. III by H. H. Boone & Theodore P. Cook (1870; pg. 330f)
- Our County and Its People: A Descriptive and Biographical Record of Genesee County, NY edited by Safford E. North (1899; Vol. 2, pg. 367f)
- Ex-State Senator Walker Dead in NYT on July 19, 1903
- Batavia Pioneer Cemetery transcriptions

New York State Assembly
Preceded by Henry F. Tarbox	New York State Assembly; Genesee County; 1869–1870	Succeeded by Volney G. Knapp
New York State Senate
Preceded by Timothy E. Ellsworth	New York State Senate; 30th District; 1886–1889	Succeeded by Greenleaf S. Van Gorder
