= James Fitzgerald (American jurist, born 1851) =

American politician

James Fitzgerald (October 28, 1851, Ireland – December 17, 1922, Manhattan, New York City) was an American jurist and politician from New York. He held various roles including member of the New York State Assembly (New York Co., 16th D.) in 1878; member of the New York State Senate (9th D.) in 1882 and 1883; Assistant District Attorney of New York County (1884–1888); judge of the New York City Court of General Sessions (1890–1898); and justice of the New York Supreme Court (1901–1912). (In New York, the "Supreme Court" is the trial-level court of general jurisdiction, not the highest court; the highest court is called the "Court of Appeals".)

In 1907, Fitzgerald presided over the first trial of Harry K. Thaw, who was accused of murder in a case that was highly sensationalized in the press to the degree that it became an early example of the "trial of the century" phenomenon of intense public attention.

== Personal background and education ==
He was possibly born in Limerick, Ireland. He attended the public schools in New York City and Cooper Union. Then he graduated from Columbia Law School, was admitted to the bar, and practiced in New York City. He was a clerk in the New York County Clerk's office for three years.

== The Thaw murder trial ==
In 1907, Fitzgerald presided over the first trial of Harry K. Thaw, who was accused of murder. Thaw was the mentally unstable heir of a railroad baron, and he had killed a renowned architect, Stanford White, who had previously sexually assaulted Thaw's wife, Evelyn Nesbit, who was a famous fashion model and chorus girl. The trial was the subject of intense public interest and was highly sensationalized in the press, becoming one of the earliest examples of the "trial of the century" phenomenon. Fitzgerald ordered the jury to be sequestered, which was a highly unusual step at the time. In a contemporaneous report, the New York Times could only identify one specific previous case in which this had occurred. Fitzgerald had to declare a mistrial when the jury was unable to agree on a verdict. After a second trial in 1908 (under a different judge) ended with verdict of not guilty by reason of insanity and Thaw was incarcerated in a state hospital for the criminally insane but continued to pursue legal challenges to his incarceration, Fitzgerald suffered a nervous breakdown in 1911 that was attributed to the strain of the trial.

== Death ==
Fitzgerald died on December 17, 1922, at his home at 34 Hamilton Terrace, in Manhattan of heart disease and was buried at the Calvary Cemetery in Queens.

New York State Assembly
Preceded by Francis B. Spinola	New York State Assembly; New York County, 16th District; 1878	Succeeded by Edward P. Hagan
New York State Senate
Preceded by Francis M. Bixby	New York State Senate; 9th District; 1882–1883	Succeeded by John J. Cullen
