= Frank B. Arnold =

American lawyer and politician (1839–1890)

Frank B. Arnold (March 29, 1839, County Clare, Ireland – December 11, 1890, Unadilla, Otsego County, New York) was an American lawyer and politician from New York.

== Life ==
He was born as Michael Edwards in County Clare, Ireland. The family emigrated to the United States during the 1840s and settled on a farm near West Hartford, Connecticut. Aged 12 years, he changed his name to Benjamin Franklin Arnold and went to live with a family in Gilbertsville where he attended the local Academy. Later, he changed his name again, to Frank B. Arnold, and had this change legalized by the court. He graduated from Hamilton College, paying his tuition by teaching at the Unadilla Academy. While teaching, he studied law, was admitted to the bar in 1864, and commenced practice in Binghamton. In 1867, he removed to Omaha, Nebraska, but returned two years later to Unadilla.

In 1873, he married Clarissa Mygatt Sands (1845–1881), and they had a daughter Clarissa Sands Arnold (1877–1926). His wife died in 1881, after giving birth to a boy who died soon after too.

Arnold was Supervisor of the Town of Unadilla from 1879 to 1885; Chairman of the Board of Supervisors of Otsego County in 1881; a member of the New York State Assembly (Otsego Co., 2nd D.) in 1885, 1886 and 1887; and a member of the New York State Senate (23rd D.) in 1888 and 1889.

In November 1890, he ran for Congress in the 24th District, but was defeated by Democrat John S. Pindar. During the election campaign, the newspapers unearthed the fact of his name change and intimated that it had been done "for dishonorable and degrading reasons." Depressed by the defeat and the slander campaign, he shot himself dead in his office with a pistol which had been the "murder weapon" in a case which he had defended in 1887, when he had obtained a verdict of manslaughter for his client. He was buried at St. Matthew's Cemetery in Unadilla.

== Sources ==
- The New York Red Book compiled by Edgar L. Murlin (published by James B. Lyon, Albany NY, 1897; pg. 403 and 504ff)
- Biographical sketches of the members of the Legislature in The Evening Journal Almanac (1888)
- EX-SENATOR ARNOLD'S SUICIDE in New York Times on 21 December 1890
- Four Girls in Europe from the notes of Clarissa Sands Arnold, published by Deborah Stewart Weber (2010; pg. 219–227)

New York State Assembly
Preceded by Hartford D. Nelson	New York State Assembly; Otsego County, 2nd District; 1885–1887	Succeeded by Walter L. Brown
New York State Senate
Preceded by John E. Smith	New York State Senate; 23rd District; 1888–1889	Succeeded by Titus Sheard
