= Henry H. Guenther =

American politician

Henry H. Guenther (January 29, 1862 – February 28, 1914) was an American lawyer and politician from New York.

== Life ==
Guenther was born on January 29, 1862, in Buffalo, New York. His parents were German immigrants who came to America in 1851, initially settling in Philadelphia before moving to Buffalo.

When he was 18 months old, Guenther lost his right hand after he was run over by a street car. He attended public school in Buffalo and the Youngstown High School. He then studied law at Ann Arbor Law School, graduating with a LL.B. in 1881. Shortly after he graduated, he entered the office of Giles E. Stillwell, the Buffalo city attorney. He continued working under Stillwell's successor. He was admitted to the bar in 1887 and started to practice law in Buffalo.

In 1886, Guenther was elected to the New York State Assembly as a Democrat, representing the Erie County 4th District. He served in the Assembly in 1887, 1888, 1889, 1890, 1891, 1892, and 1893. He introduced a number of bills in the Assembly, including one to create a state board of architects and another to provide for a board of state textbook commissioners.

He lived in and was involved with the development of Black Rock, and was a founder of the Black Rock Business Men's Association. He was the treasurer and acting chairman of the Democratic county committee. He was also a freemason, a Shriner, and a member of the Independent Order of Odd Fellows, the Erie County Bar Association, and the Buffalo Yacht Club. He was also a member of the Buffalo Camera Club and the Adirondack League Club.

Guenther died on February 28, 1914. His body was cremated.

New York State Assembly
Preceded by John Kraus	New York State Assembly; Erie County, 4th District; 1887-1892	Succeeded by Edward Gallagher
Preceded by Myron H. Clark	New York State Assembly; Erie County, 5th District; 1893	Succeeded by Philip Gerst
