= Joseph Blumenthal (politician) =

American politician

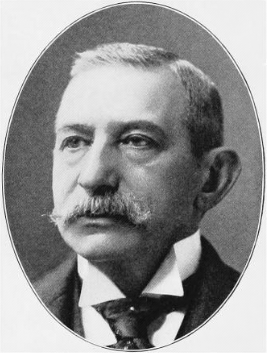

Member of the New York State Assembly
- In office 1888–1891
- Constituency: New York County 22nd District
- In office 1873–1874
- Constituency: New York County, 15 District

Personal details
- Born: December 1, 1834 Munich, Kingdom of Bavaria
- Died: March 2, 1901 (aged 66) New York, New York, US
- Resting place: Beth Olam Cemetery
- Party: Democratic
- Occupation: Businessman, politician

Joseph Blumenthal (December 1, 1834 – March 2, 1901) was a Jewish German-American businessman, politician, and communal worker from New York.

== Life ==
Blumenthal was born on December 1, 1834, in Munich, the Kingdom of Bavaria, the son of Lawrence and Rebecca Blumenthal. He immigrated to America when he was 5.

In 1853, Blumenthal moved to Mariposa County, California, where he lived for the next five years. In 1858, he returned to New York City, where he worked as a merchant and importer. He was a member of the Committee of Seventy. He served as a director and president of the Caddo Asphalt Mining Company. As a young man, he was a member of the state militia, serving as a staff officer of the Third Cavalry Regiment of the New York National Guard.

In 1872, Blumenthal was elected to the New York State Assembly as a Democrat, representing the New York County 15th District. He served in the Assembly in 1873, 1874, 1888, 1889, 1890, and 1891. He served as head of the Bureau of Incumbrances for several years, and was the commissioner taxes and assessments from 1893 to 1895.

Blumenthal was active in Jewish communal affairs. He was a member, trustee, and president of Congregation Shearith Israel, a director and president of the Young Men's Hebrew Association, and a founder and president of the Jewish Theological Seminary of America. He was also a member of B'nai B'rith and the Freemasons. He helped make the Hebrew Orphan Asylum of New York more prominent, was the first president of the Sanitary Aid Society, served as president and director of Mount Zion Cemetery, and helped in the founding of another of Jewish charities.

Blumenthal died in New York on March 2, 1901. He was buried in Beth Olam Cemetery.

New York State Assembly
Preceded by Frederick Kilian	New York State Assembly; New York County, 15 District; 1873-1874	Succeeded by Thomas Costigan
Preceded by John F. McIntyre	New York State Assembly; New York County, 22nd District; 1888–1891	Succeeded by William J. O'Dair
