= Albert C. Comstock =

American politician

Albert C. Comstock (September 20, 1845, in Lansingburgh, Rensselaer County, New York – November 14, 1910) was an American lawyer and politician from New York.

== Life ==
He was the son of James C. Comstock (born 1819). He attended the public schools and Lansingburgh Academy. Then he studied law, was admitted to the bar in 1867, and practiced. On August 11, 1869, he married Mary E. Benson (1838–1929).

Comstock was a member of the New York State Assembly (Rensselaer Co., 2nd D.) in 1880.

He was a member of the New York State Senate (16th D.) from 1884 to 1887, sitting in the 107th, 108th, 109th and 110th New York State Legislatures.

In 1895, he was elected Surrogate of Rensselaer County.

== Sources ==
- The New York Red Book compiled by Edgar L. Murlin (published by James B. Lyon, Albany NY, 1897; pg. 403, 500 and 782)
- Biographical sketches of the Members of the Legislature in The Evening Journal Almanac (1885)
- Benson genealogy

New York State Assembly
Preceded by Eli Perry	New York State Assembly; Rensselaer County, 2nd District; 1880	Succeeded by Richard A. Derrick
New York State Senate
Preceded by Charles L. MacArthur	New York State Senate; 16th District; 1884–1887	Succeeded by Michael F. Collins
