= Donald McNaughton (New York politician) =

American politician (1830–1893)

Donald McNaughton (March 29, 1830 Mumford, Monroe County, New York – July 30, 1893 Chicago, Illinois) was an American lawyer and politician from New York.

== Life ==
He attended the district schools, and then became a millwright, and later a clerk. Then he studied law, was admitted to the bar, and practiced in Wheatland. He was Secretary and Treasurer of the Rochester and State Line Railroad.

He was Supervisor of the Town of Wheatland for eight years; Chairman of the Board of Supervisors of Monroe County for one year; and a member of the New York State Senate (29th D.) from 1888 to 1891, sitting in the 111th, 112th, 113th and 114th New York State Legislatures. In 1892, he ran for Congress in the 31st District but was defeated by Republican John Van Voorhis.

In April 1892, he was appointed as Chief Executive Officer of the New York State World's Fair Commission, and died of peritonitis on July 30, 1893, in the New York State Building at the World's Columbian Exposition in Chicago.

== Sources ==
- The New York Red Book compiled by Edgar L. Murlin (published by James B. Lyon, Albany NY, 1897; pg. 403)
- Biographical sketches of the members of the Legislature in The Evening Journal Almanac (1891)
- DONALD M'NAUGHTON DEAD in NYT on July 31, 1893

New York State Senate
| Preceded by Edmund L. Pitts | New York State Senate; 29th District; 1888–1891 | Succeeded by Cornelius R. Parsons |
