= Edward F. Fagan =

American politician

Edward Francis Fagan (February 27, 1849 – December 7, 1901) was an American schoolteacher, principal, and politician from New York.

== Life ==
Fagan was born on February 27, 1849, in New York City, New York. He was of Irish parentage.

Fagan attended Manhattan College, graduating at the top of his class in 1869. He also received an M.A. in 1872 and a Ph.D. in 1880. He spent several years as a teacher for Manhattan College. In 1876, he moved to Maspeth, Queens. There, he was elected School Commissioner in 1882, served as the first principal of Long Island City High School for a number of years, and after the Consolidation of Greater New York he was appointed Superintendent of Schools in Queens. He held the latter position at the time of his death.

In 1885, Fagan was elected to the New York State Senate as a Democrat, representing New York's 1st State Senate district (Suffolk and Queens Counties). He served in the Senate in 1886 and 1887.

Fagan died at home from a brain abscess on December 7, 1901. He was buried in Calvary Cemetery.

New York State Senate
Preceded by James Otis	New York State Senate; 1st District; 1886–1887	Succeeded by Simeon S. Hawkins
