= John J. Cullen =

American politician

John J. Cullen (January 1, 1845 in Mullingar, County Westmeath, Ireland – June 19, 1896 in New York City) was an American politician from New York.

== Life ==
The family emigrated to the United States soon after John's birth. He attended the public schools in New York City, and then became a porter in a dry-goods store.

Cullen was a member of the New York State Assembly (New York County, 18th D.) in 1882.

He was a member of the New York State Senate (9th D.) from 1884 to 1887, sitting in the 107th, 108th, 109th and 110th New York State Legislatures.

He died on June 19, 1896, at his home at 219 East 39th Street, in New York City, "after a protracted illness."

== Sources ==
- The New York Red Book compiled by Edgar L. Murlin (published by James B. Lyon, Albany NY, 1897; pg. 403 and 501)
- Second Annual Record of Assemblymen and Senators from the City of New York in the State Legislature published by the City Reform Club (1887; pg. 76ff)
- OBITUARY RECORD; John J. Cullen in NYT on June 21, 1896

New York State Assembly
Preceded by Joseph P. McDonough	New York State Assembly; New York County, 18th District; 1882	Succeeded by Daniel S. McElroy
New York State Senate
Preceded by James Fitzgerald	New York State Senate; 9th District; 1884–1887	Succeeded by Charles A. Stadler
