= William S. Church =

American politician (1858–1928)

William Stewart Church (1858–1928) was an American politician from Monroe County, New York.

== Life ==
Church was born in February 1858 in Riga, New York, as the son of Col. Dennis Church. He attended the common schools; Phillips Academy in 1871 and 1872; Canandaigua Academy from 1873 to 1875; and the Columbia College School of Mines from 1876 to 1879. Then he engaged in farming. He married Helen S. Shields (1863–1960). Church and his wife are interred in Riga.

He was a Democratic member of the New York State Assembly (Monroe Co., 3rd D.) in 1888.

Assemblyman Elihu Church was his grandfather.

== Sources ==
- Biographical sketches of the members of the Legislature in The Evening Journal Almanac (1888)

New York State Assembly
Preceded by George W. Sime	New York State Assembly; Monroe County, 3rd District; 1888	Succeeded by Edwin A. Loder
