= Edward Hawkins (New York politician) =

American politician

Edward Hawkins (January 21, 1829 in Stony Brook, Suffolk County, New York – June 10, 1908 in Jamesport, Suffolk Co., NY) was an American manufacturer and politician from New York.

== Life ==
He was the son of Daniel Shaler Hawkins (1798–1868) and Sophia (Smith) Hawkins (1802–1841). He attended the public schools, and then went to sea, becoming a ship captain. In 1870, he and his brothers began the manufacture of fish meal and fish oil from menhadens.

He was a Democratic member of the New York State Senate (1st D.) in 1890 and 1891, defeating his brother Simeon S. Hawkins who ran on the Republican ticket for re-election.

Edward Hawkins died on June 10, 1908, at his home in Jamesport.

One of his daughters was married to Congressman Joseph M. Belford (1852–1917).

== Sources ==
- The New York Red Book compiled by Edgar L. Murlin (published by James B. Lyon, Albany NY, 1897; pg. 403)
- Biographical sketches of the members of the Legislature in The Evening Journal Almanac (1891)
- Simeon S. Hawkins at Sweezey Genealogy
- Capt. Edward Hawkins in NYT on June 11, 1908

New York State Senate
Preceded by Simeon S. Hawkins	New York State Senate; 1st District; 1890–1891	Succeeded by Edward Floyd-Jones
