= Greenleaf S. Van Gorder =

American politician

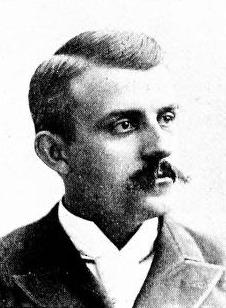

Member of the New York Senate from the 30th district
- In office 1890–1893
- Preceded by: Edward C. Walker
- Succeeded by: Charles Lamy

Greenleaf Scott Van Gorder (June 2, 1855 York, New York – November 2, 1933) was an American lawyer and politician from New York.

== Life ==
He attended the common schools, Angelica Academy, and Alfred University. Then he studied law, was admitted to the bar in 1877, and practiced in Pike.

He was Clerk of the Town of Pike from 1878 to 1881; Supervisor of the Town of Pike from 1883 to 1887; a member of the New York State Assembly (Wyoming Co.) in 1888 and 1889; and a member of the New York State Senate (30th D.) from 1890 to 1893, sitting in the 113th, 114th, 115th and 116th New York State Legislatures.

In May 1904, his brother John Van Gorder and his half-sister Anna Farnham were murdered at their home on a farm in West Almond.

== Sources ==
- The New York Red Book compiled by Edgar L. Murlin (published by James B. Lyon, Albany NY, 1897; pg. 403f and 506f)
- Biographical sketches of the members of the Legislature in The Evening Journal Almanac (1891)
- SLAIN WITH HIS HALF SISTER in NYT on May 5, 1904

New York State Assembly
Preceded by Edward A. Pierce	New York State Assembly; Wyoming County; 1888–1889	Succeeded by I. Sam Johnson
New York State Senate
Preceded by Edward C. Walker	New York State Senate; 30th District; 1890–1893	Succeeded by Charles Lamy
