= Edward F. Reilly =

American politician

Edward F. Reilly (March 7, 1856 in New York City – September 28, 1890 in New York City) was an American lawyer and politician from New York.

== Life ==
He was the son of Terence Reilly, an immigrant from Ireland. He attended public schools, and then became a bookbinder. He was a clerk in the New York Sheriff's office from 1877 to 1885. During his tenure in the sheriff's office and the Legislature, he studied law, and was admitted to the bar. In politics he was a Tammany Hall Democrat.

Reilly was a member of the New York State Assembly (New York Co., 6th D.) in 1885.

He was a member of the New York State Senate (6th D.) from 1886 to 1888, sitting in the 109th, 110th and 111th New York State Legislatures. In June 1888, he married Cora L. Mitchell. In November 1888, Reilly was elected Clerk of New York County, and resigned his seat in the State Senate.

Reilly took office as County Clerk on January 1, 1889, but died in the middle of his three-year term. He had suffered for some time from "a sort of malaria", and spent the summer of 1890 in Saratoga, the home of his wife. In September he returned to New York City to attend to business, but died suddenly on September 28, 1890 at his home at 6 Attorney Street, from "typhoid fever".

== Sources ==
- The New York Red Book compiled by Edgar L. Murlin (published by James B. Lyon, Albany NY, 1897; pg. 403 and 504)
- Third Annual Record of Assemblymen and Senators from the City of New York in the State Legislature published by the City Reform Club (1888; pg. 93ff)
- EDWARD F. REILLY IS DEAD in NYT on September 29, 1890

New York State Assembly
Preceded by Peter Henry Jobes	New York State Assembly; New York County, 6th District; 1885	Succeeded by Philip Kiernan
New York State Senate
Preceded by Timothy J. Campbell	New York State Senate; 6th District; 1886–1888	Succeeded by Thomas F. Grady
