= Joseph Harry Kent =

American politician

Joseph Harry Kent (October 28, 1843 – July 13, 1903) was a British-born politician who served in the New York State Assembly for two terms from 1888 to 1889.

== Life ==
Kent was born on October 28, 1843, in Warwickshire, England, the son of George and Elizabeth Kent.

Kent came to the United States as a boy and grew up in Utica, New York. In 1862, he enlisted in the 146th New York Infantry Regiment during the American Civil War and served until the conclusion of the war.

In November 1887, Kent, a Democrat, was elected to the New York State Assembly, representing Oneida County's First District. He was renominated the next year and reelected to a second term. He unsuccessfully pushed for Utica to annex the town of Deerfield.

He later worked as a meat inspector for the New York State Board of Health.

He died on July 13, 1903, following an operation for stomach cancer.

New York State Assembly
Preceded by Benjamin Hall	New York State Assembly; Oneida County, 1st District; 1888-1889	Succeeded by James K. O'Connor
