= Titus (disambiguation) =

Titus (AD 39–81) was Roman emperor from 79 to 81.

Titus may also refer to:

== Bible ==
- Epistle to Titus, a book of the Bible

== People ==
=== Given name ===
==== Ancient Rome ====
- Titus (praenomen)
- Emperor Vespasian (AD 9–79), also named Titus Flavius Vespasianus, later Titus Flavius Caesar Vespasianus Augustus, father of Emperor Titus
- Emperor Domitian (AD 51–96), Titus Flavius Domitianus, later Titus Flavius Caesar Domitianus and Titus Flavius Caesar Domitianus Augustus
- Titus Livius (59 BC–AD 17), historian usually referred to as Livy in English
- Titus Pomponius Atticus (110/109 BC–35/32 BC), philosopher and friend of Marcus Tullius Cicero
- Titus Quinctius Flamininus (c. 229 BC–174 BC), politician and general instrumental in the Roman conquest of Greece
- Titus Labienus (c. 100 BC–45 BC), Roman general
- Titus Tatius (died 748 BC), according to tradition the Sabine king who attacked Rome but reconciled with the Roman king Romulus
- Titus (usurper), one of the Thirty Tyrants in the Historia Augusta
- Titus Antoninus Pius, Roman emperor from 138 to 161
- Titus Pullo, centurion in Caesar's legions
- Titus Tarquinius, son of the last king of Rome

==== Early Christians ====
- Saint Titus (died 96 or 107), fellow worker with St. Paul of Tarsus and pastor of the first Christian church in Crete at Gortyn
- Titus of Byzantium, Patriarch of Constantinople (242–272)
- Titus of Bostra (died c. 378), Christian theologian and bishop
- Titus, another name for Saint Dismas in Arabic Christian tradition

==== Other people with the given name ====
- Titus Bramble (born 1981), English footballer
- Titus Brandsma (1881–1942), outspoken Dutch Catholic opponent of Nazism
- Titus Corlățean (born 1968), Romanian politician and diplomat
- Titus Davis, American football player
- Titus Hjelm (born 1974), Finnish musician and academic
- Titus Kaphar, American painter
- Titus Leo (born 1999), American football player
- Titus Lewis (1773–1811), Welsh Calvinist and writer
- Titus Munteanu (1941–2013), Romanian filmmaker
- Titus Oates (1649–1705), English perjurer who fabricated the "Popish Plot"
- Titus van Rijn (1641–1668), son of the Dutch painter Rembrandt
- Titus Salt (1803–1876), manufacturer, politician and philanthropist in West Yorkshire, creator of alpaca cloth
- Titus Sandy Jr (born 2002), Dominica footballer
- Titus Thotawatte (1927–2011), Sri Lankan director and editor
- Titus Welliver (born 1961), American actor
- Titus Zeman (1915–1969), Slovak Salesian and Catholic priest prosecuted by the communist regime

=== Surname ===
- Alan Titus (born 1945), American baritone
- Andrew Jackson Titus (1814-1855), American politician, soldier, and planter, and namesake of Titus County, Texas
- Bob Titus, American politician
- Christopher Titus (born 1964), comedian actor of the sitcom Titus
- Cliff Titus, (1890–1988), American politician, Missouri state senator
- Craig Titus (born 1965), American former professional bodybuilder and convicted murderer
- Dina Titus (born 1950), American politician
- Eve Titus (1922–2002), children's writer
- Herb Titus (1937–2021), Constitution Party vice-presidential candidate in the 1996 US election
- Jack Titus (1908–1978), Australian rules footballer
- Mark Titus (born 1987), Ohio State University basketball player and blogger
- Robert Titus (colonist) (c. 1600–c. 1670), English Puritan, New England settler
- Robert C. Titus (1839–1918), New York politician
- Robin L. Titus (born 1954), member of the Nevada Assembly
- Roger W. Titus (1941–2019), US District Court judge
- Silas Titus (1811–1899), American Civil War soldier and active organizer of the city of Syracuse, New York
- Silas Wright Titus (1849–1922), engineer and inventor of water pumping systems, discoverer of water supplies for New York City
- Silius Titus (1623–1704), captain of Deal Castle, and Gentleman of the Bedchamber to King Charles II
- Theo Titus (1920–2008), American politician, writers, journalist, and businessman
- William A. Titus (1868–1951), American businessman and politician

=== Nickname ===
- Nickname of British Antarctic explorer and army officer Lawrence Oates (1880–1912)

=== Ring name ===
- Ryan Wilson, professional wrestler
- Titus O'Neil, ring name of professional wrestler Thaddeus Bullard

== Places ==
- Titus, the ancient name of the Krka River in Croatia
- Titus County, Texas, US

== Animals ==
- Titus (gorilla)
- Titus (spider), a genus of spiders
- Titus (dinosaur), a fossilised specimen of Tyrannosaurus

== Arts and entertainment ==
=== Fictional characters ===
- The title character of Titus Andronicus, a tragedy by Shakespeare
- Titus (comics), a white tiger alien appearing in Marvel Comics media
- Titus, Lexa's top counsel in the TV series The 100
- Titus, the titular character of the video game Titus the Fox
- Demetrian Titus, the playable character in the video game Warhammer 40,000: Space Marine
- Titus Andromedon, in the Netflix comedy series Unbreakable Kimmy Schmidt
- Titus Andronicus (character), the protagonist of William Shakespeare's play Titus Andronicus
- Titus Faversham, in the radio comedy series The Penny Dreadfuls Present...
- Titus Fitch, a central character in The Sea, the Sea by Iris Murdoch
- Titus Groan, protagonist in the Gormenghast books by Mervyn Peake
- Titus Pullo (Rome character), a Roman centurion in the HBO TV series Rome
- Titus Strega-Borgia, a character in the Pure Dead series by Debi Gliori
- Titus, a cannibalistic past tribute from District 6 in The Hunger Games
- Komutan Titus, a Templar commander and antagonist in the Turkish TV series Diriliş: Ertuğrul
- Titus, an antagonist in the animated film Hoppers

=== Other arts and entertainment ===
- Titus (film), a 1999 film adaptation of Shakespeare's play
  - Titus (soundtrack) of the 1999 film
- Titus (TV series), American situation comedy based on Christopher Titus

== Businesses ==
- Titus Books (publisher), a New Zealand publisher
- Titus Interactive, a defunct French video game company

== Other uses ==
- TITUS (project), for creation of an Indo-European languages thesaurus
- TITUS Cyberbit Basic, a typeface
- MV Titus, a fishing vessel that served during World War II as a minesweeper
- Nexter Titus, a French Infantry mobility vehicle

== See also ==
- Titas (disambiguation)
- Tito (disambiguation)
- Senator Titus (disambiguation)
- Titus Andronicus (disambiguation)
- Tituss Burgess, actor
- Titusz, Hungarian given name
- Tytus, Polish name
- Tidus, protagonist of Final Fantasy X
