= Tita =

Tita may refer to:

== People ==
- Tita (given name)
- Tita (surname)

== Other uses ==
- Tita language, Benue–Congo language of Nigeria
- Tita Neire, mountain in Valais, Switzerland
- Tita Vendia vase, Roman wine container from 620–600 BC
- Tita in Thibet, English play written in 1879
- Tita Tovenaar, Dutch television series

== See also ==
- Titas (disambiguation)
- List of places named after Josip Broz Tito
