= Senator Titus =

Senator Titus may refer to:

- Cliff Titus (1890–1988), Missouri State Senate
- Dina Titus (born 1950), Nevada State Senate
- Kenny Titus (fl. 2020s), Kansas State Senate
- Robert C. Titus (1839–1918), New York State Senate
- William A. Titus (1868–1951), Wisconsin State Senate
