= Augustus Wade Dwight =

American lawyer

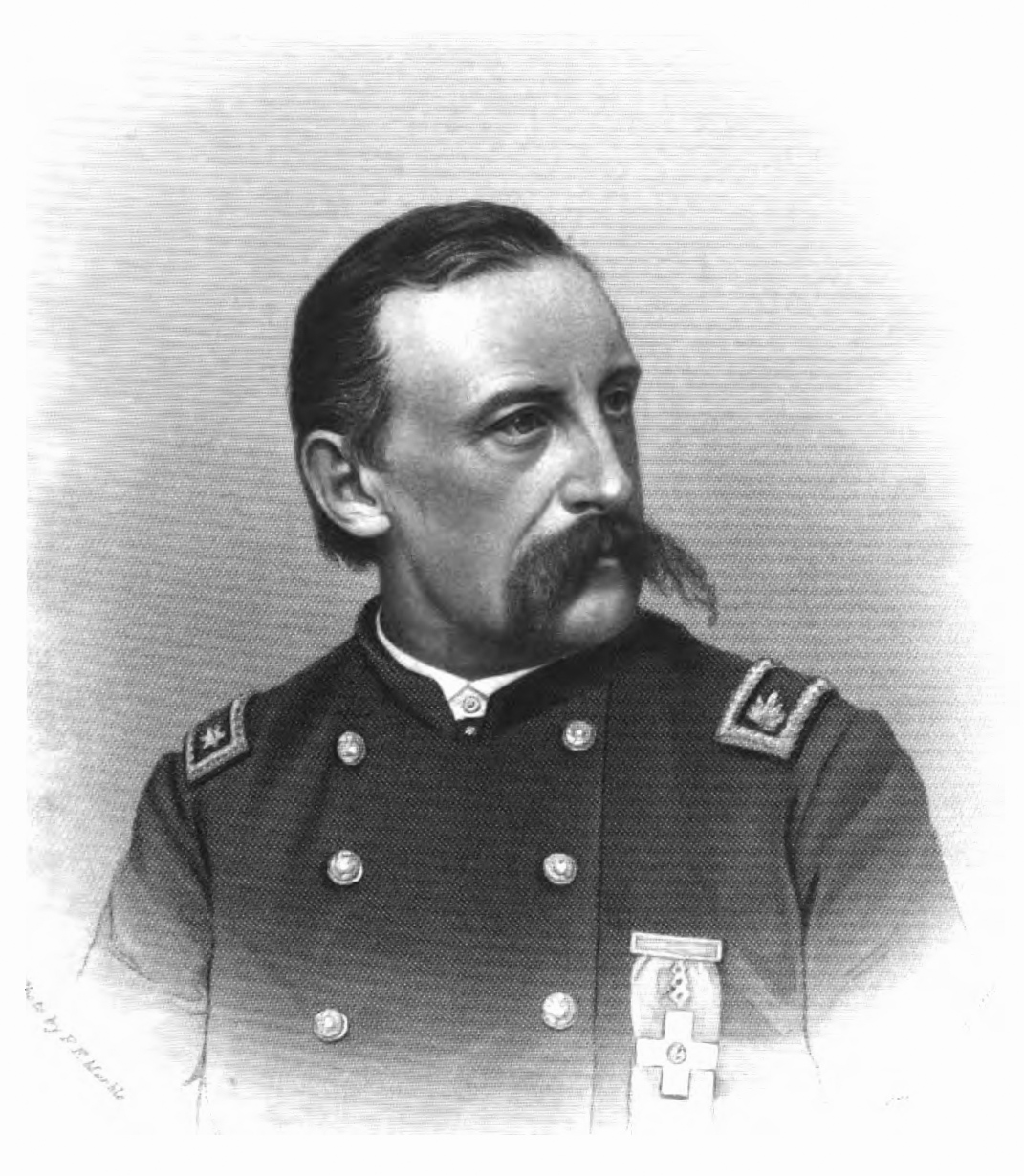
- Born: February 27, 1827; Halifax, Vermont
- Died: March 26, 1865 (aged 38); Petersburg, Virginia
- Burial place: Oakwood Cemetery
- Military career
- Allegiance: United States of America; Union
- Branch: Infantry
- Service years: 1862–1865
- Rank: Colonel (acting)
- Commands: 122nd New York
- Conflicts: American Civil War: Battle of Antietam; Battle of Gettysburg; Battle of the Wilderness; Battle of Spotsylvania; Battle of Cold Harbor; Second Battle of Petersburg; Battle of Opequon; Battle of Cedar Creek; Siege of Petersburg

Augustus Wade Dwight (February 22, 1827 – March 26, 1865) was a lawyer who became an officer in the American Civil War. He served in 21 battles and was wounded three times, the last wound being fatal.

== Life ==
Augustus Wade Dwight was born February 22, 1827, in Halifax, Vermont, the oldest of nine children. His father was physician Morris Dwight of the New England Dwight family, born October 1, 1796, and mother was Minerva Bryant, born February 18, 1800. In 1829 the family moved to Cummington, Massachusetts, as the father practiced medicine, and in 1839 to Poughkeepsie, New York, where his father tried to raise mulberry trees. In 1840 they moved to LaFayette, New York.

Dwight enrolled in Yale College in September 1851; his distant cousin Theodore Dwight Woolsey was president of Yale at the time. However, he dropped out in February 1852 when he could not afford it. Instead he went to California to join the California Gold Rush. He studied law for a while in California. Somehow he ended up on a ship to the Hawaiian Islands, and from there to China. Returning to the US, he had circumnavigated the earth. He studied for the bar and was admitted to practice in Onondaga County, New York, in 1859.

== American Civil War ==
A year into the American Civil War, additional troops were being raised in Onondaga County. Dwight volunteered for the Union Army for what he thought would be a three-year enlistment. He was commissioned as Captain of Company E of the 122nd New York Volunteer Infantry Regiment on July 8, 1862. By August 28, 1862, was promoted to lieutenant colonel under Colonel Silas Titus, and was sent immediately into combat action as part of the Army of the Potomac.

In its first engagement, the Battle of Antietam, they were kept in reserve and there were no losses. After a few other skirmishes, they saw heavy fighting at the Battle of Gettysburg in July 1863. Sickness also took its toll on the regiment. Several times Col. Titus was ill and Dwight had led the troops. Other times, both officers were unable to lead and command passed to Captain Horace Hall Wapole (later promoted to lead the regiment). Titus was also called away to serve as Provost Marshal.

Dwight would often send reports back to the Syracuse Journal newspaper, and wrote letters notifying relatives of men who were killed in action.

On September 19, 1864, at the Battle of Opequon, he received his first wound, a severe contusion of his right thigh, but was able to continue in his post. On October 19, 1864, he was more severely wounded at Battle of Cedar Creek when a ball shattered his right wrist. He was given a medical discharge and sent home to recover with an effectively useless right arm.

Dwight left home again on January 30, 1865, to rejoin his regiment which was at the Siege of Petersburg. He officially replaced Titus to command the regiment as acting colonel on February 28, 1865, under Colonel Thomas W. Hyde who was in turn acting as brigade commander.

On the early morning of March 25, 1865, Confederate forces launched the daring surprise attack on Fort Stedman near Petersburg. After initially capturing the Union fort, the attack stalled and the fort was retaken. In response, later that day Dwight's regiment was ordered to take some of the weakened trenches on the Confederate's right side. During the operation, he was hit it the head by artillery fire and was instantly killed. His commission as full colonel was not finalized before his death. He was buried in Oakwood Cemetery in Syracuse, New York.

At the dedication of a monument for the regiment in 1888 at the Gettysburg Battlefield, speeches mentioned Dwight as the one "to whom the efficiency of the regiment was so largely due."
