= Tita (given name) =

Tita is a given name or nickname of the following notable people:

Nickname

- Tita (Lord Byron) (1798–1874), full name Giovanni Battista Falcieri, personal servant of Lord Byron
- Tita (footballer, born 1958), full name Milton Queiroz da Paixão, Brazilian football manager and former forward
- Tita (footballer, born 1981), full name Sidney Cristiano dos Santos, Brazilian football forward
- Tita (Portuguese footballer), full name Ana Filipa Capitão Lopes, Portuguese women's football midfielder
- Tita (singer) (born 1999), full name Hristina Milenova Pencheva, Bulgarian singer
- Tita, fictional protagonist for Mexican novel Like Water for Chocolate

Given name

- Tita Aida, American social activist
- Tita Bărbulescu (1936–2021), Romanian folk singer
- Tita Bell (fl. 1995–2007), American television soap opera writer
- Tita Cervera (born 1943), Spanish socialite and former Miss Spain
- Tita Duran (1929–1991), Filipina actress
- Tita von Hardenberg (born 1968), German noblewoman and television journalist
- Tita Kovač Artemis (1930–2016), Slovene chemist and writer
- Tita Larasati (born 1972), who also uses the diminutive Tita Larasati, is an Indonesian industrial designer and cartoonist
- Tita Mandeleau (born 1937), Senegalese writer
- Tita Merello (1904–2002), Argentine actress and dancer
- Tita Muñoz (1926–2009), Filipina actress
- Tita Rădulescu (1904–1983), Romanian bobsledder
- Tita Swarding (1952–2013), Filipino radio broadcaster
- Tita Valencia (born 1938), Mexican novelist and poet
- Tita de Villa (1931–2014), Filipina actress
