= Titusz =

Male given name

Titusz is a masculine given name. It is the Hungarian form of the name Titus.

Notable people with the name include:

- Ottó Titusz Bláthy (1860–1939), Hungarian electrical engineer
- Titusz Csörgey (1875–1961), Hungarian ornithologist
- Titusz Dugovics (died 1456), soldier during the Siege of Belgrade
