= De Oegekloostermolen, Hartwerd =

Building in Súdwest-Fryslân

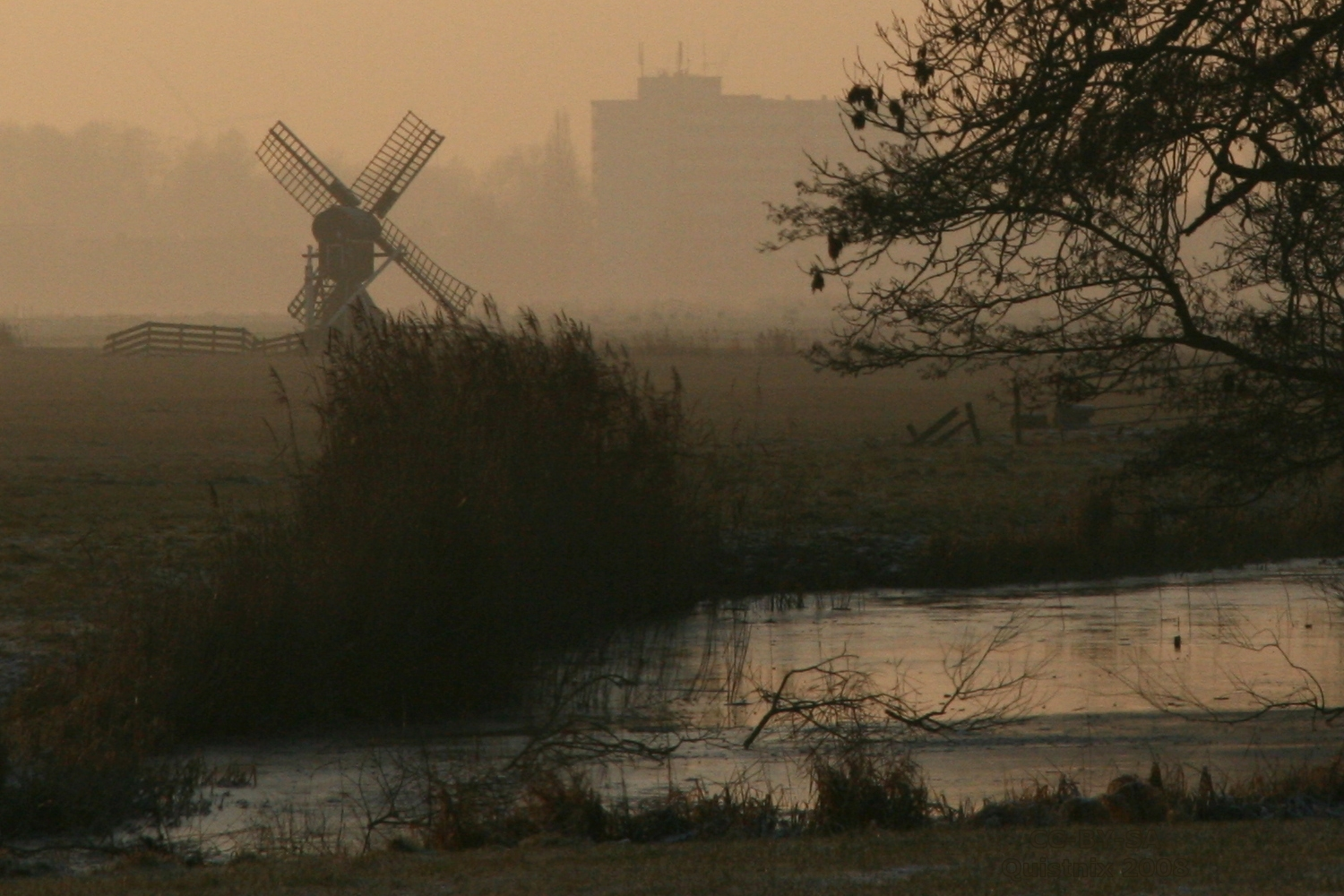
- De Oegekloostermolen, December 2008

Origin
- Mill name: De Oegekloostermolen
- Mill location: Kloosterweg 5, 8741 KB Hartwerd
- Coordinates: 53°04′00″N 5°33′35″E
- Operator(s): Stichting De Fryske Mole
- Year built: Early 19th century

Information
- Purpose: Drainage mill
- Type: Hollow Post mill
- Roundhouse storeys: Single storey roundhouse
- No. of sails: Four sails
- Type of sails: Common sails
- Windshaft: Wood
- Winding: Tailpole and winch
- Type of pump: Archimedes' screw

De Oegekloostermolen is a hollow post mill in Hartwerd, Friesland, Netherlands which was built before 1830. The mill has been restored to working order. It is listed as a Rijksmonument, number 39347.

== History ==
De Oegekloostermolen was first marked on a map dated 1830. It was built to drain the 90 pondemaat (33 ha; 82 acres) Hartwerd-West polder. A restoration was carried out in 1970 by millwright Westra of Franeker. In 1981, the mill was sold by the Knol brothers to De Hollandsche Molen. In 1986, Westra fitted a new roof and sails to the mill. A further restoration in 1985 put the mill back into full working order. The mill was working until 1989. On 17 May 1989 it was sold to Stichting De Fryske Mole (English: Frisian Mills Foundation). The mill is kept in reserve should it be needed to drain the polder.

== Description ==
De Oegekloostermolen is what the Dutch describe as an spinnenkop. It is a hollow post mill on a single storey octagonal roundhouse, one of only four in Friesland. The mill is winded by tailpole and winch. The roundhouse and mill body are boarded, while the roof is covered in horizontal weatherboards. The sails are Common sails. They have a span of 9.10 metres (29 ft 10 in). The sails are carried on a wooden windshaft The windshaft also carries the brake wheel which has 33 cogs. This drives the wallower (16 cogs) at the top of the upright shaft. At the bottom of the upright shaft, the crown wheel, which has 27 cogs drives a gearwheel with 28 cogs on the axle of the Archimedes' screw. The axle of the Archimedes' screw is 230 millimetres (9 in) diameter. The screw is 800 millimetres (2 ft 7 in) diameter and 3.20 metres (10 ft 6 in) long. It is inclined at 25°. Each revolution of the screw lifts 106 litres (23 imp gal) of water.

== Public access ==
De Oegekloostermolen is open by appointment.
