= Titus Andronicus (disambiguation) =

Titus Andronicus is a tragedy by William Shakespeare.

Titus Andronicus may also refer to:

- Titus Andronicus (band).
- Titus Andronicus (ballad)
- Titus Andronicus (character).

== See also ==
- Titus (disambiguation)
- Category:Works based on Titus Andronicus: lists things that may be called "Titus Andronicus" or simply "Titus".
