= Tobermory Cat =

- Tobermory Cat's Facebook logo
- Created by: Angus Stewart

In-universe information
- Species: Cat
- Gender: Male
- Occupation: Celebrity cat, "famous for being famous"

Tobermory Cat is the name of a celebrity ginger cat used as an "evolving, interactive artwork" by Scottish artist Angus Stewart.

== Background ==
The Distillery Cats originally lived at The Tobermory Distillery Tobermory on Mull, Argyll, Scotland, their two ginger cats were named Tobermory and Ledaig after two whiskies produced at the Tobermory Distillery. The cat named Tobermory remained at the distillery while Ledaig later moved to Browns Hardware Shop. A third ginger cat known as "McGinty" or the Mishnish Cat lived at Mishnish Hotel. Together these three similar ginger cats became a single fictional cat character named Tobermory Cat through a Facebook page created by Angus Stewart. Ledaig died on 12th October 2025. Tobermory died in September 2012).

Angus Stewart's Facebook page entitled Tobermory Cat, created 25 Feb 2011. Due to the Facebook page and promotional merchandise the name Tobermory Cat became widely used by visitors and residents of Tobermory. He published a book, Tobermory Cat subtitled famous for being famous, published 22 September 2012, Tobermory Cat Publishing, Softback, 52 pages, ISBN 0957463103. There is also a later illustrated children's book produced under a licensing agreement, The Tobermory Cat published 12 October 2012, by Debi Gliori published by Birlinn. Birlinn, Limited, Hardback, 32 pages, ISBN 1780270992. An earlier work (with no association to the town) featuring a troublesome talking cat named 'Tobermory' appeared in a collection of short stories by Saki titled The Chronicles of Clovis in 1911.

== Angus Stewart's Tobermory Cat ==
On 25 February 2011, Tobermory artist Angus Stewart created a Facebook page and viral marketing project entitled "Tobermory Cat" containing photoshopped images of the famous for being famous celebrity cat. As the Facebook page gained popularity the character became an "internet sensation", attracting regional and national press coverage in The Guardian and BBC Scotland's television news programme Reporting Scotland. Stewart's artistic creation is a parody of celebrity culture based largely on the T.V. persona of Donald Trump, his brand and use of promotion. The famous Tobermory Cat lived in T.C.Towers and enjoyed the trappings of fame such as paparazzi photographers and a helicopter seen delivering cat books and postcards around Scotland. The work was fabricated using photoshopped images of the everyday antics of three cats in a work usually set in Tobermory however during Spring 2012 Tobermory Cat was seen traveling around the world, the cat having been photoshopped into images supplied by Facebook followers around the world. The resulting photographs are described using exaggerated celebrity terms, the premise being that by repeatedly describing a cat as famous it will become famous. The fictional work is narrated by the second assistant tea maker at T.C.Management and explores the nature of the construct of celebrity through a fictional cat who is simply "famous for being famous". Having created and promoted his fictional work, Angus Stewart registered the web domain tobermorycat.co.uk 22 November 2011, registered as a company Tobermory Cat Ltd 19 March 2012 and applied for the Tobermory Cat Trade Mark on 23 March 2012.

As part of the creative work, the artist documented the process of creating and promoting his fictional celebrity cat on the Facebook page. In December 2011 a prominent Scottish publisher and a children's book illustrator visited the artist with a view to producing a series of children's books about the famous Tobermory Cat. There followed a long running legal dispute centering on creative rights leading to publisher Birlinn challenging the artists trademark "Tobermory Cat" in both the UK and USA. The impact of the dispute became a prominent theme on Stewart's Tobermory Cat Facebook page.

Tobermory Cat is now a registered UK trademark held by Angus Stewart. The dispute over the rights and attribution of the work was covered in the media during November 2012. Birlinn raised an opposition action against Angus Stewart's Tobermory Cat trademark at Edinburgh Sheriff Court on 30 October 2014. On 27 July 2015 a public statement was released by both parties, the matter having been resolved by means of a license agreement.

== See also ==
- List of individual cats
