= Silas Wright Titus =

- Born: January 18, 1849; Syracuse, New York, U.S.
- Died: January 7, 1922 (aged 72); Brooklyn, New York, U.S.
- Father: Silas Titus
- Relatives: Thomas McCarthy (grandfather)

Silas Wright Titus (January 18, 1849 – January 7, 1922) was an engineer who discovered and patented deep water pumping technology and discovered early water supplies for New York City and other towns and cities in the United States in the late nineteenth century. He was known as “The Water Wizard”.

== Life and career ==
Silas Wright Titus was born on January 18, 1849, in Syracuse, New York. He was the son of Col. Silas Titus of Syracuse and grandson of Thomas McCarthy. He was named for a friend of his father's, Silas Wright, a US Senator, Governor of New York, and a member of Andrew Jackson's cabinet. He was educated in the Syracuse schools and developed an interest in Civil Engineering. In 1861, at the age of 12, he served as a bugler in the 12th New York Volunteer Infantry during the American Civil War. He was discharged from service in 1865. When he was 20 years old he worked with the engineering force in the construction of the New Orleans, Mobile and Texas Railroad.

About 1884 he moved to Southwestern Texas to begin studying underground water supplies. He helped to develop and construct 125 groundwater wells in the vicinity of San Angelo, Texas. He subsequently invented a method for locating and procuring groundwater by means of drilling and pumping. He was granted seven patents on lifting water by air. He moved back to New York in about 1896.

== New York City water supply ==
In the early 1900s the New York City water supply began to experience severe water shortages. Up until that time the majority of the city's water came from reservoirs and well north of the city. Droughts had threatened the supply to the city. Around 1892 the borough of Brooklyn drilled several wells near the town of Jameco, Long Island. The city engineers operated the wells for several years. With the best machinery available they were only able to produce 500,000 US gallons (1,900 m^{3}) per day. The city was about to abandon the wells at Jameco when Titus offered to run the plant. He was allowed to run the plant under a contract with machinery he invented and patented. Soon the wells were producing 8,000,000 US gallons (30,000 m^{3}) per day.

According to Titus, the Water Department engineers were jealous and they persuaded the Water Commissioner to "dispense with his services". Under the City's operation of the wells, production dropped to 1.5 million US gallons (5,700 m^{3}) per day. The city engineers concluded that the Jameco wells had exhausted the water supply under Long Island. One of the head engineers said he "would stake his professional reputation that not a gallon more water could be obtained from the station that was then obtained". The city was about to abandon the wells again when Titus made another proposal to operate the wells with his own machinery and furnish 1.5 million US gallons (5,700 m^{3}) per day free of charge. He requested payment of $40 for each 1 million US gallons (3,800 m^{3}) a day over the first 1.5 million US gallons (5,700 m^{3}). The city engineers laughed at him but allowed him to operate the well at Jameco again. In a short time the "exhausted" wells were producing 8 million US gallons (30,000 m^{3}) per day and later reached 11.0 million US gallons (42,000 m^{3}) per day.

From 1906 to January 1909 the city regularly paid Titus under the terms of his contract. However, in 1909 the city began to hold up payments. When the city continued to hold payments, Titus shut down his water pumps which supplied over 10% of Brooklyn's entire water supply. On the night of Oct. 28, 1909, twenty men from the water department went out to the pumping station to seize the plant and machinery. Titus met them there and told them that “somebody was going to get hurt” if they put their hands on any of his property.

== Later life ==
For a period of 15 years he worked locating and installing water plants in dry towns all throughout the U.S. and Canada. He would install the plants at his own risk and sell them to the towns only after they were fully developed and guaranteed. He never failed to produce a successful water supply plant.

He died on Saturday January 7, 1922, of arteriosclerosis at the home of his daughter in Brooklyn. He belonged to the church of St. Francis Xavier and is buried in St. John's cemetery in New York.
