= Hartwerd =

Hartwerd Hartwert
- Village
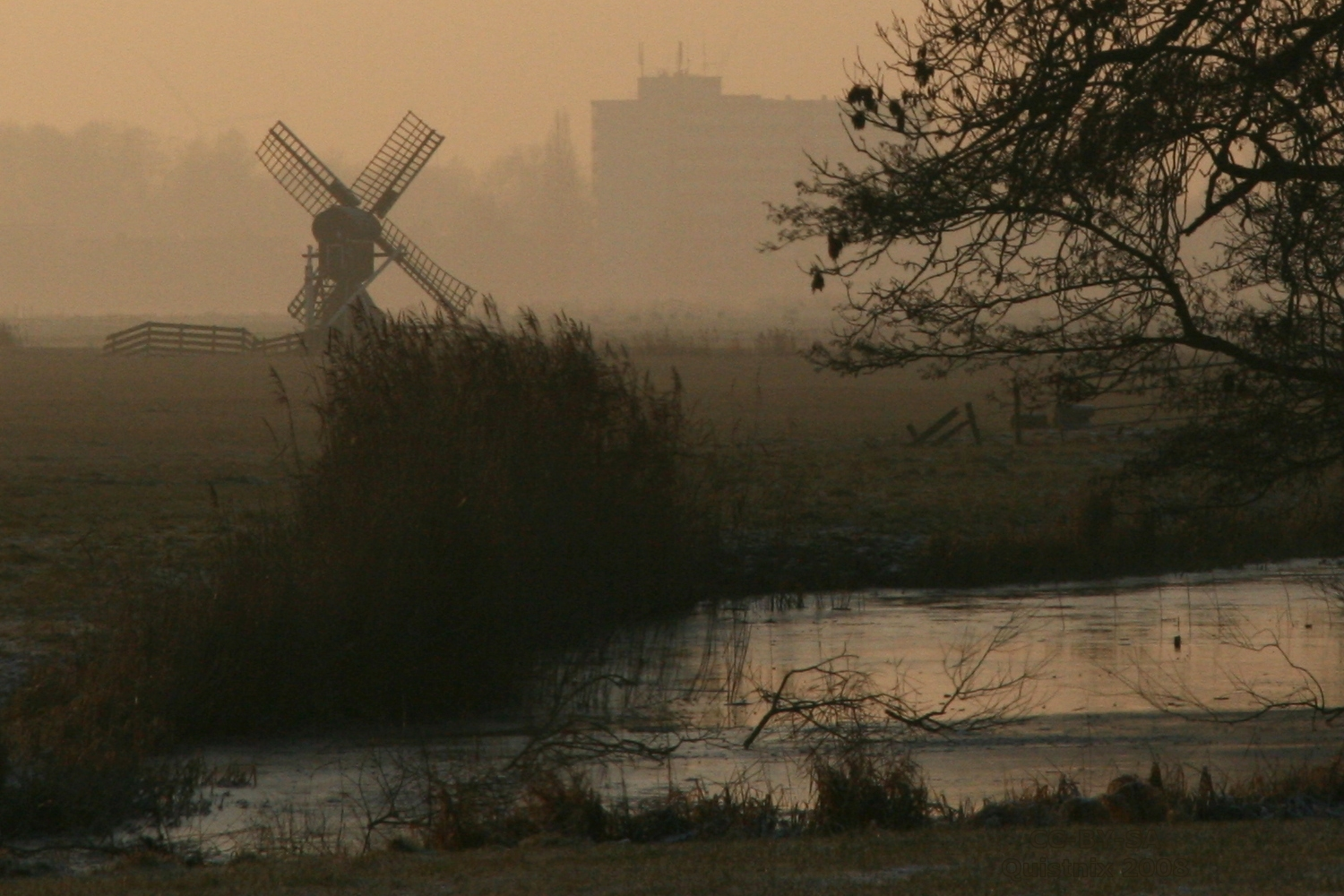
- Windmill De Oegekloostermolen

- Flag Coat of arms

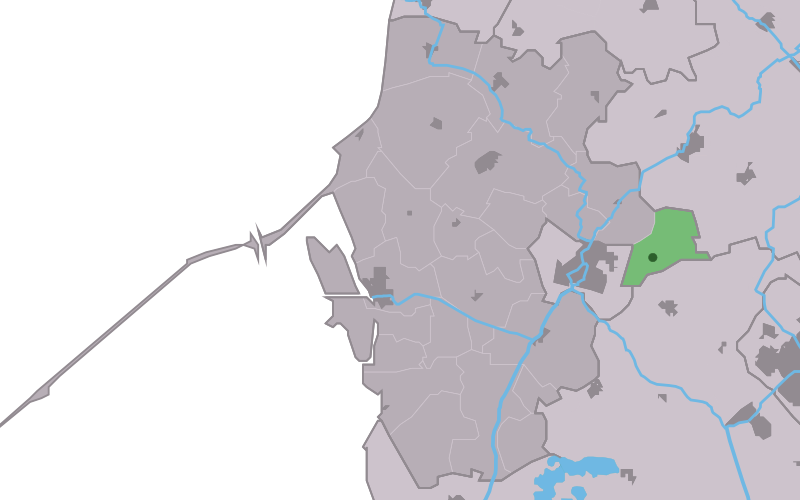
- Location in the former Wûnseradiel municipality

- Location in the Netherlands Hartwerd (Netherlands)
- Country: Netherlands
- Province: Friesland
- Municipality: Súdwest-Fryslân

Area
  - Total: 5.40 km^{2} (2.08 sq mi)
- Elevation: 0.4 m (1.3 ft)

Population (2021)
  - Total: 110
  - Density: 20/km^{2} (53/sq mi)
- Time zone: UTC+1 (CET)
  - Summer (DST): UTC+2 (CEST)
- Postal code: 8741
- Dialing code: 0515

Hartwerd (West Frisian: Hartwert) is a small village, near Bolsward, in the municipality of Súdwest-Fryslân in the Province of Friesland in the Netherlands. It had around 125 residents in January 2017.

A restored historic windmill, De Oegekloostermolen, which was built before 1830 stands near the village.

== History ==
Hartwerd was first mentioned in the 13th century as Hertwarth, and means "terp of Harte". Up to 1322, the landdag of Westergo was held at Hartwerd.

The Oegeklooster which was an outpost of Bloemkamp Abbey, stood in the vicinity of the village from 1191 to 1572. In the course of the Münster Rebellion, the monastery was attacked in 1535 by a group of Anabaptists, who badly damaged the buildings of the cloister. In 1572, the monastery was destroyed by the Geuzen.

The church of Hartwerd was demolished in 1722. The tower was demolished in 1801, and only a little bell tower remained. The polder mill De Oegekloostermolen has been known to exist as early as 1830. It has been replaced by a pumping station, however the wind mill has been designated emergency backup in 2006.

Hartwerd was home to 95 people in 1840. Before 2011, the village was part of the Wûnseradiel municipality.

== Notable people ==
The Blessed Titus Brandsma (1881–1942), O.Carm., was born on a dairy farm in Oegeklooster. He was a Carmelite friar, who became a noted scholar and philosopher, and helped to found Radboud University. He was arrested by the Gestapo during the Nazi occupation of the Netherlands for his open and strong opposition to their goals, and sent to Dachau concentration camp. There he was executed there by lethal injection in 1942. He has been declared a martyr by the Catholic Church.

== Gallery ==
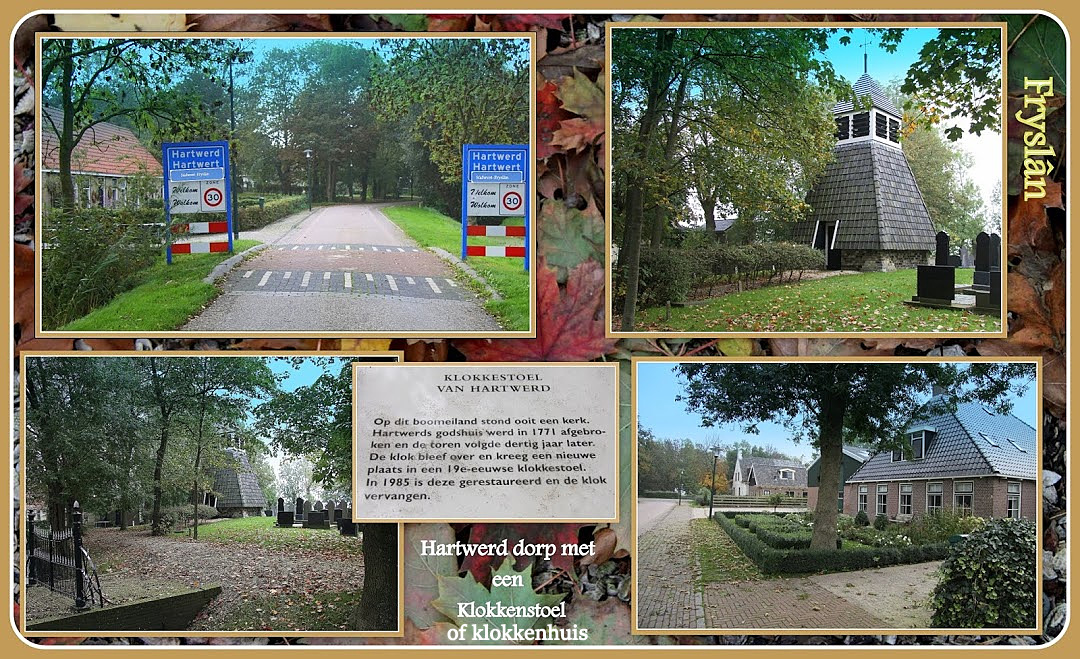
Postcard of Hartwerd

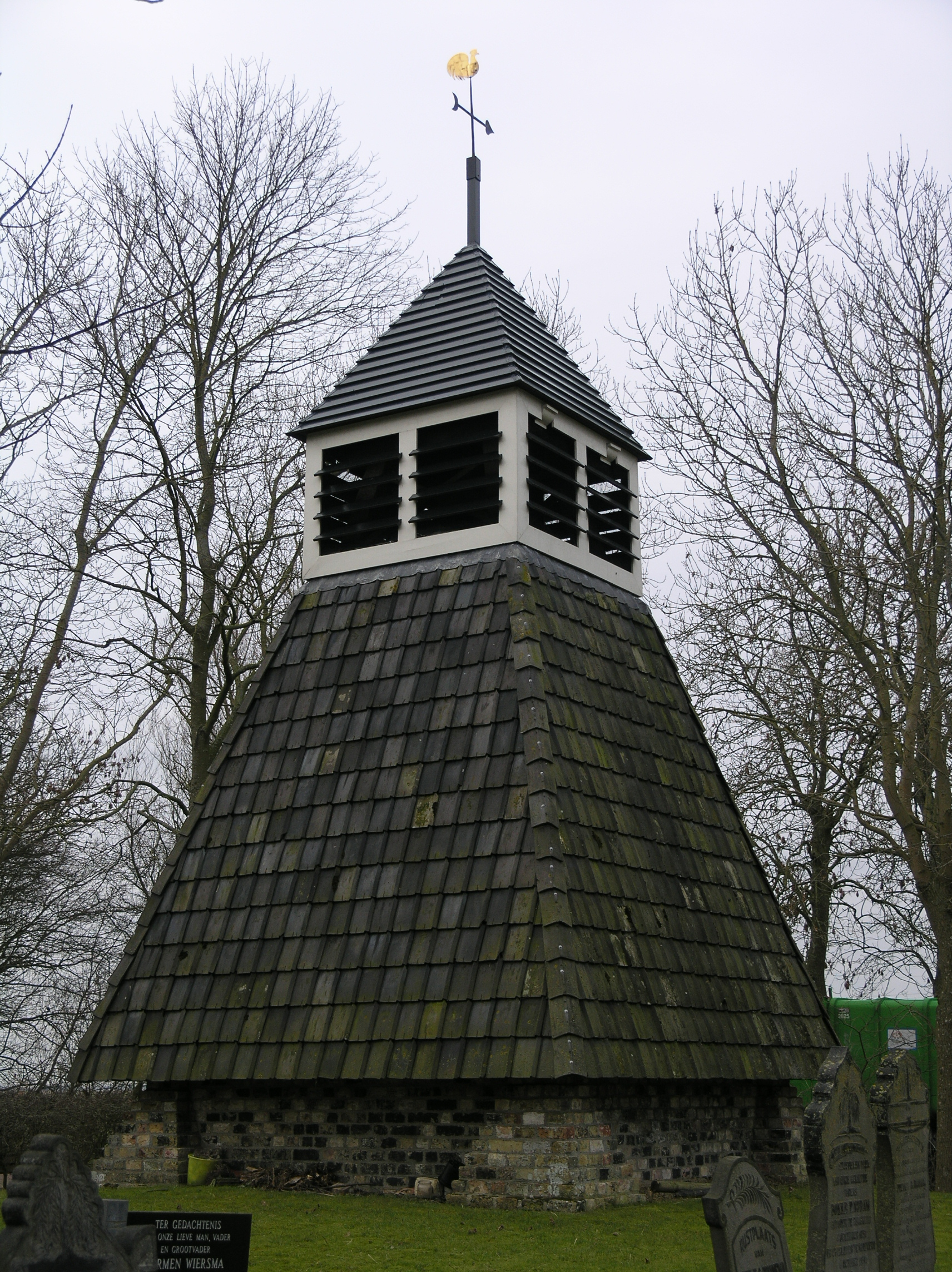
Bell tower of Hartwerd
