= Titas =

Titas may refer to:

- Titas River, in Bangladesh,
  - Titash Ekti Nadir Naam, a novel and film
- Titas Gas, Bangladesh's largest gas company, after the Titas gas field.
- Titãs, the Titans, a Brazilian band
  - Titãs (album)
- Titas Upazila, an Upazila of Comilla District

== See also ==
- Titus (disambiguation)
- Tita (disambiguation)
