= Debi Gliori =

Scottish children's writer and illustrator

- Born: 1959 (age 66–67); Glasgow, Scotland
- Occupations: Writer, illustrator
- Children: 5
- Writing career
- Genres: Children's literature, picture books

Debi Gliori (born 1959) is a Scottish writer and illustrator of children's books.

== Life and career ==
Gliori was born in Glasgow and grew up there as an only child. She started writing children's books in 1976 and attended art school in Edinburgh from 1979 to 1984. She then received an Andrew Grant travelling scholarship award to go to Milan, and worked as a freelance from 1984. In 1989, independent children's book publisher Walker Books signed her, and she acquired an agent three years later.

Gliori is the creator of many children's books including the Mr Bear picture book series. She wrote the black comedy Pure Dead series for older children, with Pure Dead Magic being her first novel.

Gliori has five children. She lives in Haddington, East Lothian.

== Reception ==
Reviewing What's the Time Mr Wolf? in We Love This Book, Caroline Downie writes, "Gliori's illustrations are a delight, full of detail and surprises", with "so many things on each page to discover, share, count and laugh at."

On BookTrust's website, What's the Time Mr Wolf? is described as "a delightful story, inspired by traditional fairy tales as well as the familiar playground game, 'What's the Time Mr Wolf?'" The reviewer found the book to contain much "lively detail" and "beautiful illustrations" and suggested that it would make a perfect and soothing bedtime story.

At SchoolZone, schools librarian Joy Court found What's the Time Mr Wolf? to be "an enchantingly original story" and "a delight to read aloud". She writes that the book is "perfect for practising telling the time" and for the [British] educational Key Stage 1.

At Parents in Touch, the reviewer writes that the book is humorous, "filled with much loved characters" and contains "catchy text" which is "a joy to read aloud". The reviewer adds that the illustrations are "packed with thoughtful detail" and an "utter delight".

== Awards ==
Mr. Bear won the Red House Children's Book Award for picture books in 1997. Mr. Bear to the Rescue was shortlisted for the Kate Greenaway Medal in 1997; Mr. Bear Babysits, Mr. Bear's Picnic and Mr. Bear to the Rescue were all awarded a Gold award in the Petit Filous Best Toy Awards, and Mr. Bear Says Goodnight was chosen for the Booktrust's Bookstart project. Where, Oh Where, is Baby Bear? was shortlisted for the Sainsbury's Baby Book Award in 2001. Always and Forever, written by Alan Durant and illustrated by Debi Gliori, was shortlisted for the Kate Greenaway Medal in 2003. Her work has also been shortlisted for the Scottish Arts Council Award (for Pure Dead Wicked in 2003), and for the Royal Mail Award (for Stormy Weather in 2010). On 6 November 2018 she was awarded an honorary Doctorate of Letter at Strathclyde University.

== The Tobermory cat ==
Two small cats known as The Distillery Cats appear on The Tobermory Distillery Sign. In 2012, the origin of the idea of Gliori's book, The Tobermory Cat came under fierce online dispute. There have been a number of creative works using the name "Tobermory", most notably an illustrated children's book, The Tobermory Cat by Debi Gliori and the earlier Facebook page and book entitled Tobermory Cat by the Isle of Mull artist Angus Stewart.

== Selected works ==
=== Series ===
==== Pure Dead ====
Pure Dead Magic (2001)
Pure Dead Wicked (2002)
Pure Dead Brilliant (2003)
Deep Trouble (2004) aka Pure Dead Trouble
Deep Water (2005) aka Pure Dead Batty
Deep Fear (2006) aka Pure Dead Frozen
Pure Dead Magic / Pure Dead Wicked / Pure Dead Brilliant (omnibus) (2004)

==== Witch Baby ====
Witch Baby and Me (2008)
Witch Baby and Me Go to School (2009)
Witch Baby and Me After Dark (2009)
Witch Baby and Me on Stage (2010)

=== Collections ===
Debi Gliori's Bedtime Stories (2002)

=== Picture books ===
New Big Sister (1991)
New Big House (1992)
My Little Brother (1992)
Dulcie Dando, Soccer Star (1992)
Lizzie and Her Friend (1993)
Lizzie and Her Puppy (1993)
A Lion at Bedtime (1993)
Lizzie and Her Dolly (1993)
Oliver's Alphabets (1993)
Mr. Bear Babysits (1994)
The Snowchild (1994)
When I'm Big (1994)
A Present for Big Pig (1994)
Willie Bear and the Wish Fish (1995)
Mr. Bear's Picnic (1995)
The Snow Lambs (1995)
Mr. Bear to the Rescue (1996)
Lizzie and Her Kitty (1996)
Princess and the Pirate King (1996)
Mr. Bear Says Are You There, Baby Bear? (1997)
Mr. Bear Says a Spoonful for You (1997)
Mr. Bear Says Good Night (1997)
Mr. Bear Says I Love You (1997)
Mr. Bear Says Peek-A-Boo (1997)
Mr. Bear Novelty Book (1997)
Corragan Is Ordagan (1998)
Hello, Baby Bear (1998)
Mr. Bear Says Hello, Baby Bear (1998)
Mr. Bear's New Baby (1998)
Mr. Bear Says a Little Hush Please (1998)
Mr. Bear Says Can I Have a Hug? (1998)
Mr. Bear Says Let's Go Outside (1998)
Mr. Bear Says Tickly Under There (1998)

Give Him My Heart (1999)
No Matter What (1999)
Mr. Bear's Vacation (2000)
Mr. Bear's Holiday (2000)
Polar Bolero (2000)
Flora's Blanket (2001)
Where, Oh Where, Is Baby Bear? (2001)
Tell Me What It's Like to Be Big (2001)
Tell Me Something Happy Before I Go to Sleep (2002)
Can I Have a Hug? (2002)
Tickly Under There (2002)
Penguin Post (2002)
Flora's Surprise (2003)
Flora's Flowers (2003)
The Big Mr Bear Storybook (2003)
Where Did That Baby Come From? (2004)
Woodland Tales: Hush Little Chick (2005)
Woodland Tales: Little Fox's Picnic (2005)
Little Owl's Swim (2005)
Wake Up Little Rabbit (2005)
Goodnight, Baby Bat! (2007)
Little Bear and the Wish Fish (2008)
The Trouble with Dragons (2008)
Are You There, Baby Bear? (2009)
Bear's Bedtime Lullaby (2009)
Stormy Weather (2009)
Mr. Bear's Birthday (2010)
The Scariest Thing of All (2011)
What's the Time, Mr. Wolf? (2012)
The Tobermory Cat (2012)

=== Anthologies (as editor) ===
Noisy Poems (1997)
Book of Nursery Rhymes (2001)

=== Articles ===
- Gliori, Debi (22 August 2012). "Amnesty teen takeover: Debi Gliori's top 10 books with pictures that open your eyes to the world". The Guardian. Guardian News and Media Limited.
