= 122nd New York Infantry Regiment =

- Active: July 22, 1862, to June 23, 1865
- Country: United States
- Allegiance: Union
- Type: Volunteer Infantry
- Size: Regiment
- Nickname(s): Onondagas
- Engagements: American Civil War: Battle of Antietam; Battle of Gettysburg; Battle of the Wilderness; Battle of Spotsylvania; Battle of Cold Harbor; Second Battle of Petersburg; Battle of Opequon; Battle of Cedar Creek; Appomattox Campaign; Battle of Sayler's Creek

Commanders
- Official Commander: Colonel Silas Titus
- Acting Commander: Lieutenant Colonel Augustus Wade Dwight
- Final Commander: Captain Horace Hall Wapole

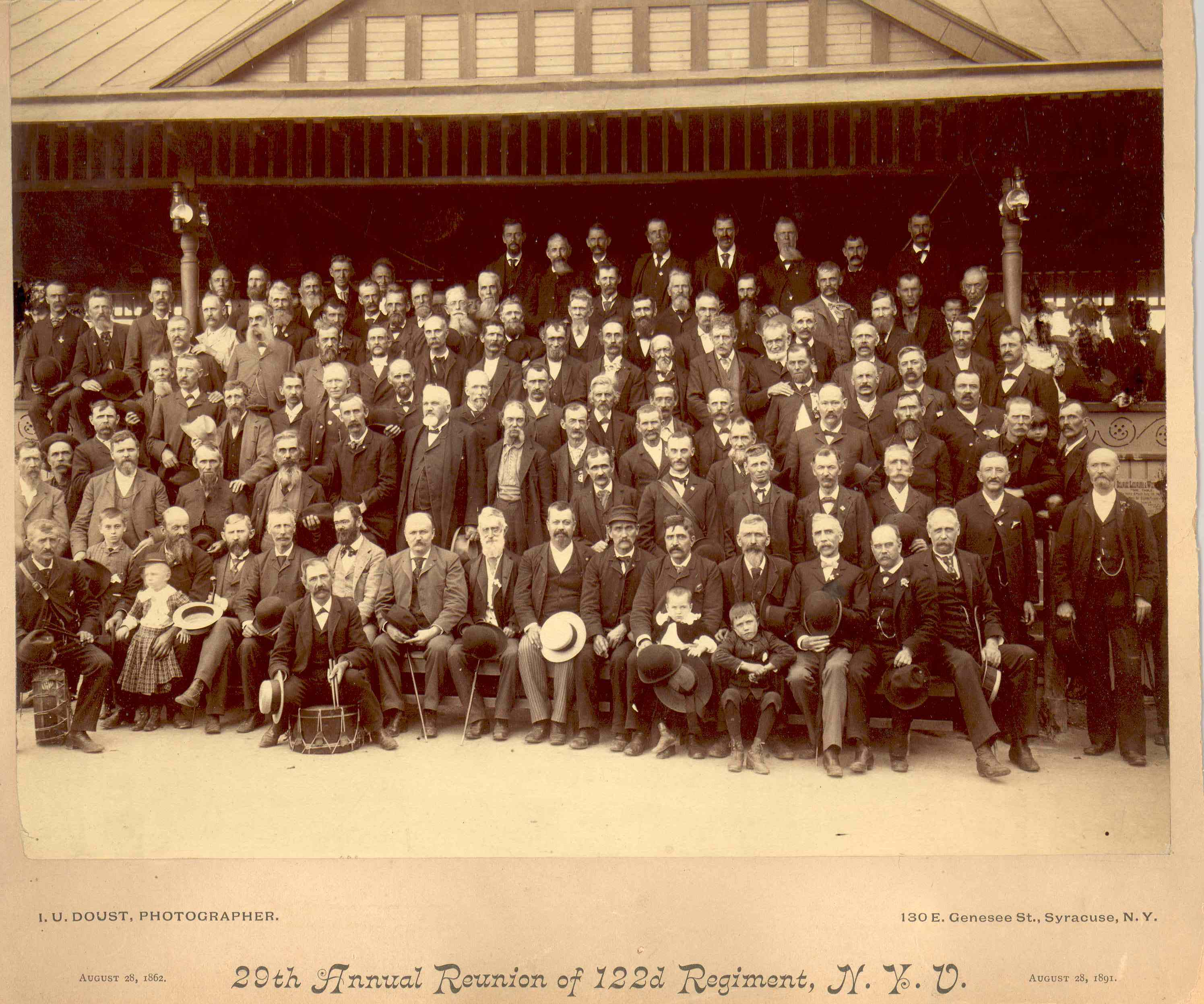
122nd NY Vol. Regiment Reunion, Aug.28, 1891. From the Leo J. Titus Jr. collection.

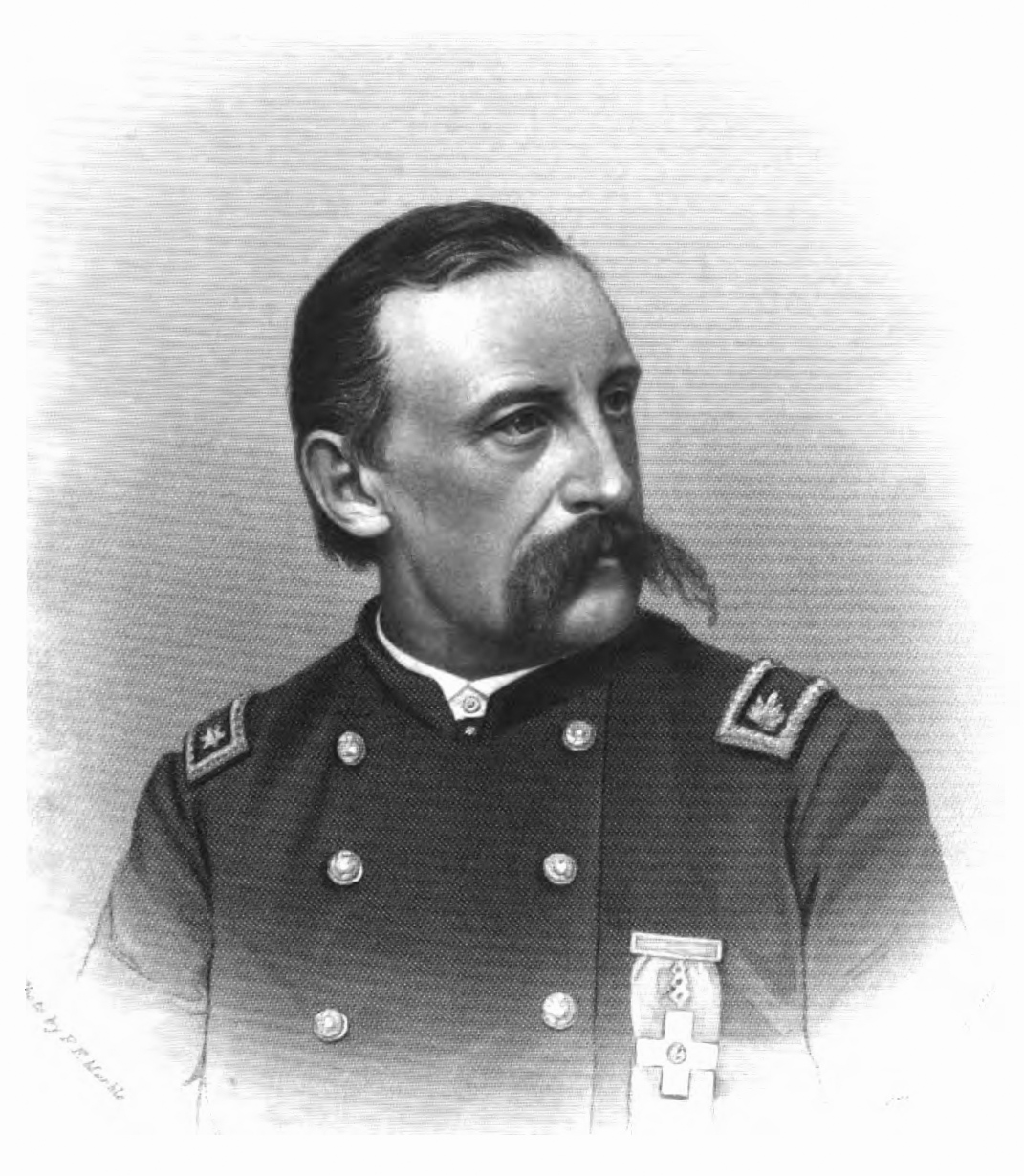
Augustus Wade Dwight

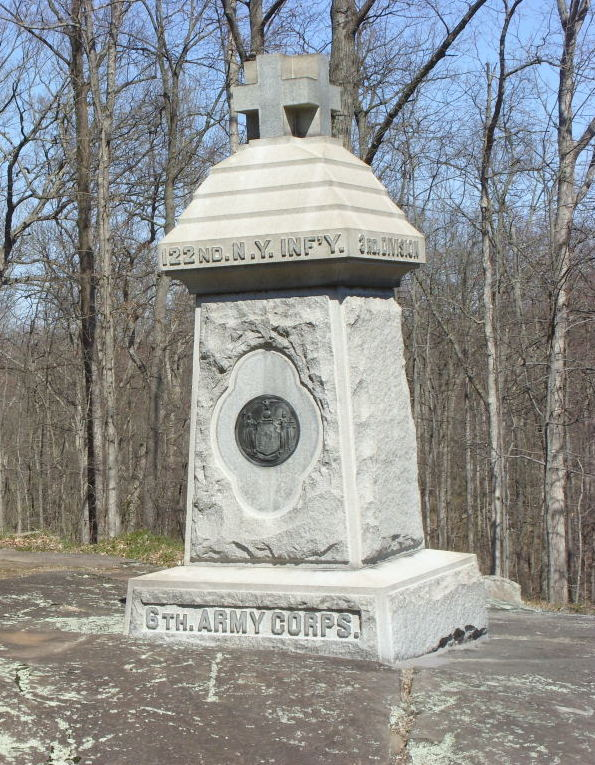
The monument to the 122nd N.Y. Volunteer Infantry at Gettysburg

The 122nd New York Infantry Regiment known as the "Onondagas", was an infantry regiment in the Union Army during the American Civil War.

== History ==
A year into the American Civil War, additional troops were being raised in Onondaga County, New York. The county was named for the Onondaga people who lived in the area. It was the third regiment to be raised from the county.

The regiment was put under Colonel Silas Titus, and was sent immediately into combat action as part of the Army of the Potomac as part of the VI Corps.

In its first engagement, the Battle of Antietam, they were kept in reserve and there were no losses. After a few other skirmishes, they saw heavy fighting at the Battle of Gettysburg in July 1863. Sickness also took its toll on the regiment. Several times Col. Titus was ill and Lieutenant Colonel Augustus Wade Dwight had led the troops until he died March 25, 1865. Titus was also called away to serve as Provost Marshal. Other times, both officers were unable to lead and command passed to Captain Horace Hall Wapole, who was later promoted to lead the regiment.

== Awards and legacy ==
Around April 1863, regiment Lieutenant William G. Tracy (born April 7, 1843) was assigned as aide-de-camp of Major General Henry Warner Slocum. On May 2 at the Battle of Chancellorsville, Tracy was sent with an urgent message to General Alpheus S. Williams about the attack by Stonewall Jackson. Finding himself behind enemy lines, he kept his nerve and made it through to Union lines despite being wounded. He was awarded the Medal of Honor for this action.

In 1888, speeches were given to dedicate a monument for the regiment in at the Gettysburg Battlefield.

William Eugene Ruggles (1844–1907) enlisted as a private in the regiment. He collected a series of drawings depicting the regiment that appear to be the work of engraver Philip M. Ostrander (a private in another Syracuse-based regiment). The drawings were bequeathed to the University of Dundee in 1958 by Ruggles' daughter, and formed the basis of a book by Professor David Swinfen published in 1982.

== Organization ==
The companies were recruited principally from these towns and organized by region:

- A Company: Baldwinsville
- B Company: Syracuse
- C Company: Fayetteville, and Farmersville
- D Company: Syracuse, Onondaga, Spafford and Amber
- E Company: Syracuse
- F Company: Marcellus and Syracuse
- G Company: Elbridge
- H Company: Camillus and Syracuse
- I Company: Syracuse
- K Company: Syracuse, New York, Skaneateles and Cicero

== See also ==
- List of New York Civil War regiments
- 12th New York Volunteer Infantry - the first Onondaga regiment
