= International League of Christian Esperantists =

The International League of Christian Esperantists (Esperanto: Kristana Esperantista Ligo Internacia, KELI) is the association of Protestant Esperantists. It was founded in 1911, during the Universal Congress of Esperanto in Antwerp. Its members from very diverse backgrounds, mostly protestant churches. KELI publishes a bimonthly magazine, Dia Regno, which started to appear regularly in 1908, when the German Paul Hübner was sure that five people would subscribe. Now the magazine serves as a tool among members in 48 countries from diverse faiths including Quakers, Lutherans, Calvinists, Anglicans, Adventists and people following Eastern Orthodoxy.

In the beginning, it was important to have basic literature. In 1912, the New Testament was published and then in 1926 the entire Bible with the Zamenhof's Old Testament translation - not privately, but in the British and Foreign Bible Society. That way, it is possible to continually have Esperanto Bibles in every Christian Bookstore throughout the entire world. Also, an edition having the deuterocanonical books (translated by Gerrit berveling of Netherlands) was published in 2003. In 1971, KELI had an official hymnal "Adoru Kantante" (Worship by Singing) with 262 songs (mostly classics), from many countries and languages, with four part harmony - a beautiful book, done professionally. Recently, conferences have used more modest looking song collections, "Tero kaj Ĉielo Kantu" (Let Earth and Heaven Sing) with 161 songs, since people preferred more modern music. Adoru, an ecumenical worship book co-edited with the catholic association IKUE, containing texts, prayers and hymnals appeared in June 2001.

After the war, KELI started to organize an annual conference with concerns about working out a program about work, study, entertainment, the conference country and local churches. More and more, because of good communication with IKUE, the Roman Catholic Esperanto-Union, the annual conferences happened together, for the first time in 1968 in Limburg/Lahn. They attracted between 90 and 200 people, many of which were IKUE or KELI members.

At Universal Congresses, IKUE and KELI value a shared communion.

In the past, KELI supported actions for the blind with the Dutchman, Jacques Tuinder, known under the name Agado E3, or now E-vid-ente. Now, its help focuses on Albania, but does not forget other aspects of misery for people with poor sight.

The task of KELI goes in two directions: to inform the Church and other Christian groups about Esperanto, and to inform the Esperanto community about Christianity.

The Bible has been translated into Esperanto.

== See also ==
- International Union of Catholic Esperantists
