= International Union of Catholic Esperantists =

The International Union of Catholic Esperantists (Esperanto: Internacia Katolika Unuiĝo Esperantista, IKUE) is an organization of Catholic Esperanto speakers. It was founded in 1910 in Paris and is now headquartered in Rome.

One of the founders, Titus Brandsma was later canonised a martyr saint of the Church.

The patron saints of the union are Our Lady of Hope, Father Titus, Pope John Paul II, Maximilian Kolbe and Pope Pius X.

== Activities ==
IKUE organizes Masses during Esperanto meetings, and also each year its own week-long international convention. Associations and local groups of Catholic Esperantists also offer meetings (Bible weekends, youth camps, etc.)

IKUE publishes Christian literature in Esperanto, e.g. the ecumenical prayer and hymnbook ADORU of 1,472 pages in 2001 (co-edited with the Protestant Esperantist association), and the encyclical Deus caritas est in 2006. Its magazine Espero Katolika (Catholic Hope) first appeared in 1903.

In 2015, the union had approximately 1,530 members in 40 countries (mainly Europe).

== Recognition from the Vatican ==
Pope Pius X welcomed the Esperanto movement and gave his Blessing to the first congress of Catholic Esperantists in 1910.

In 1977, Vatican Radio began regular broadcasts in Esperanto (three times a week since 1998). In 1990, the Congregation for Divine Worship and the Discipline of the Sacraments approved the Esperanto translation of the prayers of the Mass. The Esperanto Missal and Lectionary for Sundays and Feastdays was published in 1995. In 1994, Pope John Paul II began to include Esperanto among the languages of his annual Easter and Christmas greetings; at Easter 2006, Pope Benedict XVI continued this tradition of his predecessor.

== KELI ==
IKUE has a good relationship with KELI (The League of Christian Esperantists International); IKUE and KELI have run their annual conferences together in the past, starting in 1968 in Limburg/Lahn, and at some conferences they held communion together.

== Translation ==
The Bible has been translated into Esperanto.

== See also ==
- International League of Christian Esperantists
