= Tytus =

Tytus can refer to the following:

People with the first name of Tytus

- Tytus Czyżewski (1880-1945), Polish painter, art theoretician, Futurist poet, playwright, member of the Polish Formists, and Colorist
- Tytus Maksymilian Huber (also known as Maksymilian Tytus Huber, 1872 - 1950), Polish mechanical engineer, educator and scientist
- Tytus Działyński (1796-1861, son of Ksawery, father to Jan Kanty), Polish political activist and protector of arts
- Tytus Chałubiński (1820 - 1889), Polish physician, co-founder of the Polish Tatra Society
- Tytus Howard (born 1996), American football player
- Tytus T.J. (born 2011, India), father - Joseph tito, mother - Sighy tito, sibiling - Twingle mariya

People with a surname of Tytus

- John B. Tytus, American inventor

Fictional character

- Tytus, Romek i A'Tomek a Polish comic book series
- Tytus (Masters of the Universe) a giant in the Masters of the Universe mythos
