= Tita Mandeleau =

Senegalese writer

Tita Mandeleau is the pen name of Danièle Saint-Prix Brigaud (born 1937), a writer from Senegal.

She was born Danièle Saint-Prix in Fort-de-France, Martinique, where she lived with her mother. She attended primary school in the West Indies and then secondary schools in Senegal, France and French Sudan. After her father was discharged from the army, the family moved to Africa. She has lived in Saint-Louis, Dakar, Bamako and Paris. In 1991, she moved to New York City with her husband; the couple has four children.

Mandeleau published Signare Anna, a historical novel, in 1991.
