= Thomas McCarthy (Syracuse politician) =

Thomas McCarthy (May 10, 1786 – January 30, 1848) was nominated as the first Mayor of Syracuse, New York, in January 1848 and was veteran of the War of 1812. He was an influential citizen in early Onondaga County, New York and the father of Congressman Dennis McCarthy. He died days before receiving word he was nominated to be the first Mayor of Syracuse and thus never served.

== Biography ==
Born in Cork, County Cork, Ireland, son of Dennis McCarthy and Elizabeth McSweeney, he was bound as an apprentice draper in Dublin at the age of 14. In 1808, after being freed from his apprenticeship, he went to the United States with his brother John McCarthy. McCarthy settled in Salt Point, Onondaga County, New York where he opened a small store and manufactured salt. He served in the War of 1812 and later became a rich and influential man in Onondaga County and helped to found the first Catholic church in the county as well as the Bank of Salina. He married Percy Soule in 1812 in Salina, New York, and had several children, including Dennis McCarthy (congressman) and Eliza McCarthy, wife of Silas Titus.

In 1847 he traveled to Florida to recover from an illness. He died on January 30, 1848, just days before a letter arrived nominating him to be the first Mayor of Syracuse, New York.
