= Pure Dead series =

The Strega Borgia Chronicles is a series of black comedy novels for older children by award-winning Scottish writer and illustrator Debi Gliori. Pure Dead Magic was Gliori's first novel.

The chronicles follow the Strega Borgias, a quirky, bizarre, Italian family: Signor and Signora Strega-Borgia (Luciano and Baci) and their four children, Titus, Pandora, Damp and Nieve, who live with their mythical companions in their fictitious home StregaSchloss, in Argyll. It consists of two trilogies: Pure Dead and Deep. The Strega-Borgias share similarities to The Addams Family.

== Characters ==
=== The family ===
- Signor Luciano Strega-Borgia - The sometimes hot-tempered husband of Baci and father of Titus, Pandora, Damp and Nieve. He is very fond of his family, despite leaving them in a temper in the first book and frequently arguing with Baci. Enjoys coffee, especially cappuccino.
- Signora Baci Strega-Borgia - Luciano's wife, mother to Titus, Pandora, Damp and Nieve. She dislikes being pregnant. Baci attends a witch academy, although she is absolutely appalling at magic.
- Titus, son of the above. Twelve during the series Titus is something of a computer geek. His laptop has been used for, amongst other things, growing rather a lot of small pink clones, and receiving video clips from the future. Titus loves food, especially raspberry muffins. He has/had a band. Titus is terrified of spiders but unlike most arachnophobics seems willing to tolerate them when he has to.
- Pandora - Titus's younger sister, ten or eleven during the series. Pandora is occasionally obsessed with makeup, much to the distress of her father who believes her far too young for it. She believes that technology is dreadful and loves her pet rats, Multitudina and Terminus. Pandora is probably the most observant and intelligent of the Borgias. During the series she gains a card for the Library, an assortment of magical items, and run by the centaur, Alpha.
- Damp - The youngest Strega-Borgia up till the final book, the aptly named Damp is a baby magus who constantly keeps her nanny on her toes preventing Damp's magic from being discovered by her parents. Damp has a bat familiar called Vesper. She is a messy little girl who loves colours and glitter but in Pure Dead Brilliant she is revealed to grow up to be an arrogant and haughty individual. (This may change, seeing as that was the future in which Titus died, and was changed before the events starting to lead to that occurred.)
- Nieve (a.k.a. "little no name" or "somebody else entirely") - The new baby and younger son of the Borgias' Nieve was born in the beginning of the last book. It is implied Nieve may be as powerful a magus as his sister Damp. Nieve has a salamander familiar called Orynx. He apparently has dark brown eyes (as revealed through his internal monologues in Deep Water). **REVISION**: Though in Deep Fear (the last book) Nieve's eyes are continuously referred to as navy blue. However, this is not to be confused with the green eyes of the demon baby/changeling that takes Nieve's place with Baci for most of the book. As for Nieve being a magus, the reader is left with the suggestion that he may instead be an earthbound (or fallen angel) when Damp notices that he has fine downy feathers like angel wings around his shoulders. This is reinforced when Damp motions to Nieve that she has noticed and will keep the 'secret.' However, it is also suggested that the feathers COULD be left over from the Swan transformation. Unfortunately, we never find out for sure and the reader is left wondering as to which it is.
- Strega-Nonna (Amelia) - Cryogenically preserved six-times-great grandmother of Titus, Pandora, Damp and Nieve. She was an extremely powerful witch in her time and retains some of her power. She lives in the freezer where she lives in cryogenic preservation until science finds a cure for death and old age. This is treated as a matter of humour during most of the series but Sab considers her desperation to evade death sad as shown by his existentialist brodding in Deep Trouble. Strega-Nonna's cryogenic preservation is somewhat contradicted by the fact that witches are portrayed as immortal in the series. She may have known Mrs McLachlan as a child.
- Don Lucifer di S'Embowelli Borgia - Luciano's evil half-brother. Don Lucifer hates his brother and often tries to kill him. He is a high player in the Mafia. Don Lucifer has had plastic surgery on his face, to reduce the size of his nose. Unfortunately, it went wrong and made him look and sound, like a rat. Don Lucifer serves as one of the main antagonists of the series. In Pure Dead Brilliant he inherits millions, signed over to him by Titus (originally inherited from his grandfather, Don Chimera)
- Don Chimera - father of Luciano Strega-Borgia. Appears briefly in the first book, in a flashback to the birth of Titus.

=== The Beasts ===
The series takes place in a world similar to our own but where magical creatures are apparently quite commonplace. Among the pets belonging to Strega-Borgias are a large menagerie of sentient animals and monsters collectively referred as the Beasts. It is worth noting that Tarantella resents being called a Beast and instead refers to herself as "an arachnid."

- Ffup - A teenage dragon. Pregnant twice during the series, mother to Nestor, fiancée to The Sleeper. Fairly selfish, especially when it comes to nails and dieting. Strangely she is referred to as "he" throughout the first book. This was caused by the fact that Ffup did not realize that "he" was in fact a girl during the first book. In Pure Dead Wicked, Ffup finally realized that she was a female with a slightly hinted encounter with a male.
- Sab - The intellectual of the beasts, Sab is a gryphon with a fondness for cross-words. He and Strega-Nonna are revealed to be old friends in Deep Trouble. He is egotistical and has the ability to turn into stone. Gryphons according to Sab have very long lifespans and are widely believed to be immortal although this is not the case.
- Tock – A crocodile, who lives in the castle moat. Supposedly a vegetarian by the later books.
- Knot - A yeti who loves revolting food (including Marie Bain's slippers and the contents of Nestor's nappies).
- Nestor - Ffup's young son, a half dragon.
- Multitudina the Illiterat - An illiterate rat who 'was raised to eat books, not read them'. She is a free-range rat and one of Pandora's many pets. Multitudina has an intelligent daughter named Terminus.
- Terminus - One of Multitudina's many children and one of Pandora's pets. In contrast to her "illiterat" mother Terminus is highly intelligent and well-educated and she and Tarantella have many intellectual discussions.
- Tarantella - Pandora's pet spider. A highly sarcastic but very intelligent individual Tarantella is obsessed with lipstick and fond of eating male spiders. She is missing one leg after losing it to Fiamma D'Infer. Gliori acknowledges her similarities to the character of Tarentella.
- The Sleeper - Fiancée of Ffup and Father to Nestor. Also known as the Loch Ness Monster, lives in Lochnagargoyle Loch on the Strega-Borgia grounds. He loves it when his fiancée brings him food and places it under the jetty but is caught two-timing her in Deep Fear. He has a strong Scottish accent and a somewhat surly and misanthropic approach to life.
- Orynx - A salamander that, when it burns, makes light.

=== "The good help that was hard to find" ===
- Mrs Flora McLachlan – Nanny to Titus, Pandora, Damp and Nieve. A gifted, and ancient witch who sometimes secretly helps Baci out with her spells. She is famous for her cooking skills especially with cakes and chips.
- Marie Bain - The terrible French StregaSchloss cook. She makes disgusting food and gets very offended if the family doesn't like or eat it. In the fifth book, bribed by Don Lucifer, she arranges Luciano's arrest (see below) and later chokes to death on a putrid Christmas cake of her own making, which was rejected by the Streaga-Borgias the previous year.
- Latch – Long suffering butler to the Borgias. He answers the door and the phone. Latch often irons the newspaper. He falls in love with Miss McClachlan and eventually marries her. It is also mentioned that he is forced to wear a kilt made out of material used as a dog's bed, and hates it because it itches. Owns a small Japanese car.
- Miss Araminta Fraser (Minty) – Secondary nanny employed during Mrs McLachlan's absence. An inventive cook and all round nice person. Falls in love with Ludo Grabbit.

=== The immortals ===
Aside from Mrs McLachlan, many immortal characters appear in the series due to its nature as fantasy. The arch-villains of the series are demons who seek possession of the Chronostone with which they will be able to rule the universe. The Chronostone once belonged to the ruler of Hell, S'tan the Boss but he lost it and the main plot of the series concerns his quest to regain it by sending various minions to do battle with Mrs McLachlan for possession of the Stone. Mrs McLachlan is the only person aware of the threat posed by the demons although Titus, Pandora and Latch become aware of them. The demons are portrayed as extremely powerful and irredeemably evil creatures but are nonetheless used to great comic effect. Most demons in the series are cynical, egotistical and cruel but with a dry sense of humour.

- Astaroth - is the Second Minister of the Hadean Executive. He accidentally loses the Chronostone and the plot of Pure Dead Brilliant concerns his quest to regain it for his Boss. He disguises himself as a beautiful witch named Fiamma D'Infer to do so, but after his/her failure he is reincarnated as a gnat in punishment and later becomes imprisoned in amber. He possesses the sarcastic sense of humour that apparently comes naturally to all high ranking demons in the series.
- Isagoth: The Demonic Defence Minister, Isagoth is a demon determined to regain the Chronostone for his master, S'tan but later plans to steal it for his own ends. He is introduced in Deep Trouble and becomes one of the major antagonists over the course of the series.
- S'tan the Boss: The ruler of Hades and the main antagonist of the series, S'tan is in fact the Biblical character of the Devil. He draws his power from the Chronostone. The main plotline of the books concerns his quest to regain it. In Deep Water, after the Stone drops out of the time space continuum, he discovers that he is losing his power. As a result the stress due to his power loss he becomes very overweight. He develops an interest in cooking in Deep Fear. His name is a play on the word "Satan".

=== Other ===
- Pronto - Don Lucifer Di S'Embowelli's right-hand man. He is very intelligent and presents a soothing foil to his psychotic boss in his moments of hysteria. He was accidentally turned into bagpipes by Mrs. McLachlan in Pure Dead Magic. It is implied that Latch left him in the attic.
- Attila The Bun - One of the four gangsters hired to take out Titus Strega-Borgia, and anyone who stands in their way, in Don Lucifer's attempt to steal Titus' fortune. Always sports a full rabbit suit, which causes chaos on the journey to StregaSchloss. Attila the Bun was then devoured by Knot, the yeti.
- Ragu - Don Lucifer Di S'Embowelli's hapless chef, who is killed off near the beginning of the first book, "Pure Dead Magic". He is fed to piranhas for overcooking pasta.
- Dr. Flense-Filleto - The plastic surgeon who gives Don Lucifer his disastrous nose job. Has an off-beat sense of humour.

Rand Macalister Hall: TTitus' former friend and member of his band who

Other minor characters include the posse of surgeons, nurses etc. in the hospital where Don Lucifer's nose job takes place and numerous policemen.

== Books in the series ==
Accompanied ISBNs are for paperback editions, published by Corgi Children's in the UK.

=== Pure Dead Magic ===
(ISBN 0552547573)

The first novel in the series sees the arrival of the children's new nanny Mrs Flora McLachlan, shortly after Signor Strega-Borgia, has left, following an argument at the breakfast table. While Signora Strega-Borgia is away at the witch academy, Pandora's rats are accidentally unleashed onto the internet via email and their mother, Multitudina tries to find her babies. Unaware of this, Pandora enters into a foolish bet with Titus, to the effect that, should she fail to find the rats, she must swim the castle moat, the home of the crocodile Tock, who has, it seems, eaten all the previous applicants for the job of the Strega-Borgia's nanny. Little do they know that Flora McLachalan is a witch who will save their lives after winning them over with her delicious food and kindly, sensible personality. Meanwhile, Signor Strega-Borgia could not have picked a worse day to storm out of his house, seemingly for good. He has been kidnapped by his evil half-brother, Don Lucifer Di S'Embowelli Borgia, a rich and sadistic gentleman who takes pleasure in killing people, and will take the slightest excuse. However, he does have a weakness- his long, ugly nose. He sets fire to the house and leaves his brother to burn to death, while he goes off to have plastic surgery on his nose. By some unfortunate coincidence, the escaped mice have got stuck in the computer at the hospital where Don Lucifer is due to have his surgery- as a result, Don Lucifer looks worse than he did before his operation.

=== Pure Dead Wicked ===
(ISBN 0552548472)

The second novel in the series. The roof of the ancient family home is badly damaged and the Strega-Borgia family are forced to decamp to the local hotel, leaving the frozen granny, the rats and the spider behind. However, the builders appear to be up to something... Such as destroying a roof, murdering hotel proprietors and dating fur lovers. Titus has accidentally created 500 pink clones and he and Pandora are trying to keep them secret from Latch and Mrs. McLachlan, which becomes a challenge as the 10% size clones grow up.

=== Pure Dead Brilliant ===
(ISBN 0552547514)

Baci's friends from the witch academy are coming to stay, much to the family's despair. However there is something suspicious about one of the guests. Pandora and Titus have continuous fights over the money that Titus has inherited, which stop when they discover a clock that lets them travel back in time. Damp is revealed to be a Magus and Lucifer offers Mrs.McLachlan a marriage proposal.

The title comes from the popular Scottish expression "Pure dead brilliant".

=== Deep Trouble ===
Also published as Pure Dead Trouble (ISBN 0552550469).

A vengeful demon is trying to invade StregaSchloss. However, Titus is too busy on the internet looking up the world destroying company SapienTech, Pandora only has eyes for the gorgeous (and pyromaniac) new butler temporarily replacing Latch and the beasts are raising funds to give the moat a makeover by volunteering for medical science. Only Flora McLachlan has noticed and is doing something about it!

=== Deep Water ===
Also published as Pure Dead Batty.

After Isagoth's attack on Stregaschloss, Mrs.McLachlan has thrown herself into Lochnagargoyle in order to hide the Chronostone, and Luciano is blamed for the murder. Titus ingests 'acanthoid wax', which causes him to grow at an alarming rate, and develop a crush on the new nanny that Baci hired, Araminta Fraser. Luciano's lawyer, Munro MacAlister Hall, botches his case, while making sure that his son, Rand, stays occupied at StregaSchloss, in order to make Baci forget about Luciano, and fall in love with him instead. It is revealed that S'tan is losing his demonic traits, while Mrs.McLachlan and Isagoth share an island, in the company of Death and the Chronostone.

=== Deep Fear ===
Also published as Pure Dead Frozen. (ISBN 0552550485).

This is the ultimate in the series. StregaSchloss is invaded by wolves, demons, vengeful Mafia uncles, and a changeling while Isagoth puts his plan to take over Hell into action.

== Awards ==
Pure Dead Wicked was shortlisted for the Scottish Arts Council Award in 2003.
