= Tita (Portuguese footballer) =

Portuguese association football player

Personal information
- Full name: Ana Filipa Capitão Lopes
- Date of birth: 14 September 1989 (age 37)
- Place of birth: Pedrógão Grande, Portugal
- Height: 1.75 m (5 ft 9 in)
- Position: Midfielder

Senior career*
Years	Team	Apps	(Gls)
2009–2012	Cadima		
2012–2013	Atlético Ouriense	13	(13)
2013	Atlético Ouriense B	1	(1)
2013–2016	Cadima		
2016–2018	Ferreirense	40	(10)
2018–2020	Benfica	6	(3)

International career^{‡}
2006–2008	Portugal U19	15	(1)
2010–2013	Portugal	9	(0)
- * Club domestic league appearances and goals as of 24 June 2019 ‡ National team caps and goals as of 25 December 2018

Ana Filipa Capitão Lopes (born 14 September 1989), commonly known as Tita, is a Portuguese professional footballer who plays as a midfielder. She is a Portuguese international.

== Honours ==
Benfica

- Campeonato Nacional II Divisão Feminino: 2018–19
- Taça de Portugal: 2018–19
