= Titus Brandsma =

Dutch Catholic priest (1881–1942)

Saint Titus Brandsma OCarm
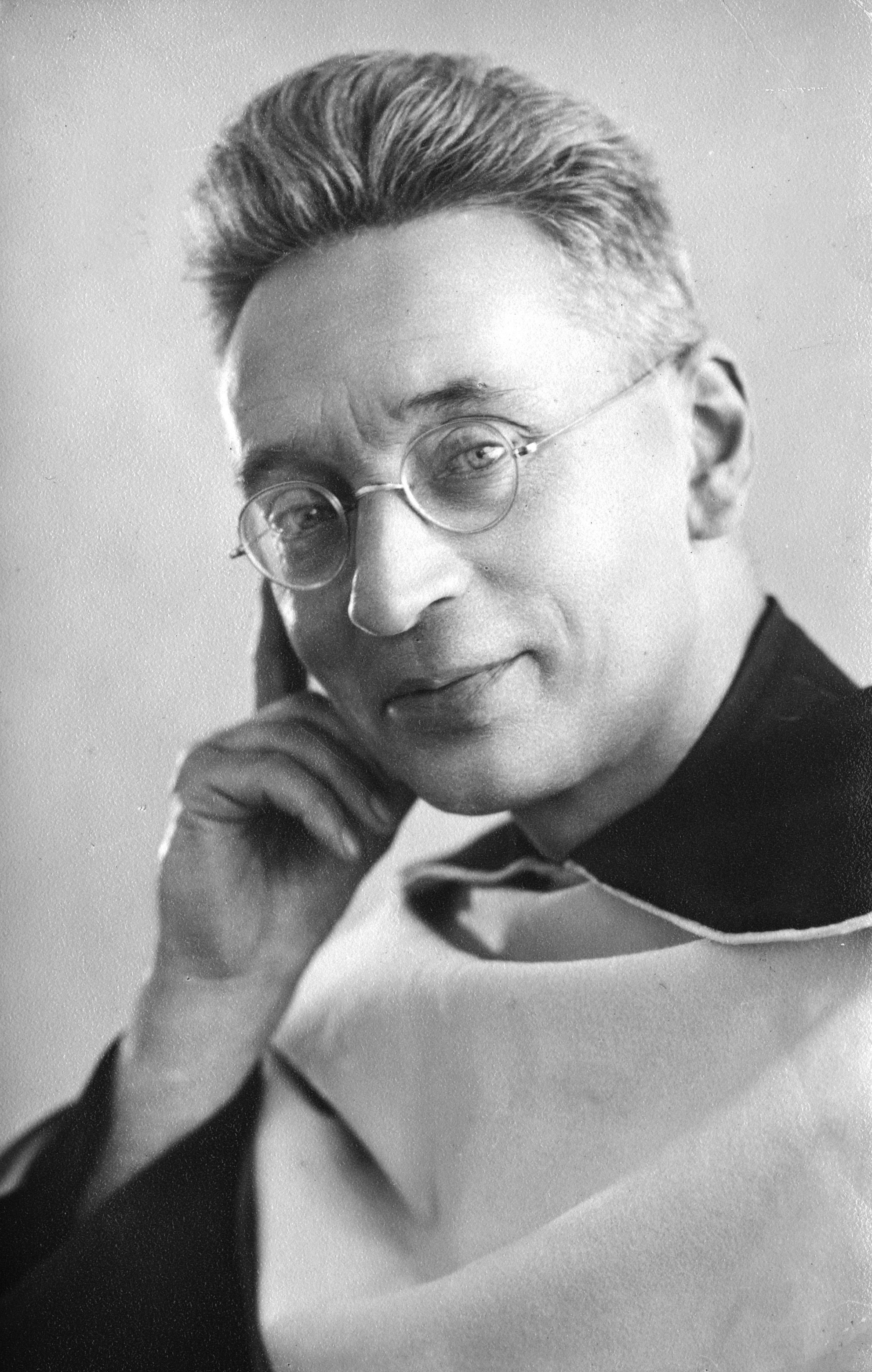
- Brandsma in the 1920s

Martyr
- Born: Anno Sjoerd Brandsma; 23 February 1881; Oegeklooster, Friesland, Netherlands
- Died: 26 July 1942 (aged 61); Dachau concentration camp, Bavaria, Nazi Germany
- Venerated in: Catholic Church
- Beatified: 3 November 1985, Saint Peter's Basilica, Vatican City by Pope John Paul II
- Canonized: 15 May 2022, Saint Peter's Square, Vatican City by Pope Francis
- Major shrine: Titus Brandsma Memorial, Nijmegen, Netherlands
- Feast: 27 July
- Attributes: Carmelite habit, Nazi concentration camp badge, Martyr's palm
- Patronage: Catholic journalists, Catholic Esperantists, Friesland,Oss

Titus Brandsma (Dutch: [ˈtityz ˈbrɑntsmaː]; born Anno Sjoerd Brandsma; 23 February 1881 – 26 July 1942) was a Dutch Carmelite priest and a professor of philosophy. Brandsma was vehemently opposed to Nazi ideology and spoke out against it many times before World War II. He was imprisoned at the Dachau concentration camp, where he was murdered in 1942.

Brandsma was beatified by the Catholic Church in November 1985 as a martyr of the faith and canonized on 15 May 2022 by Pope Francis.

== Early life ==
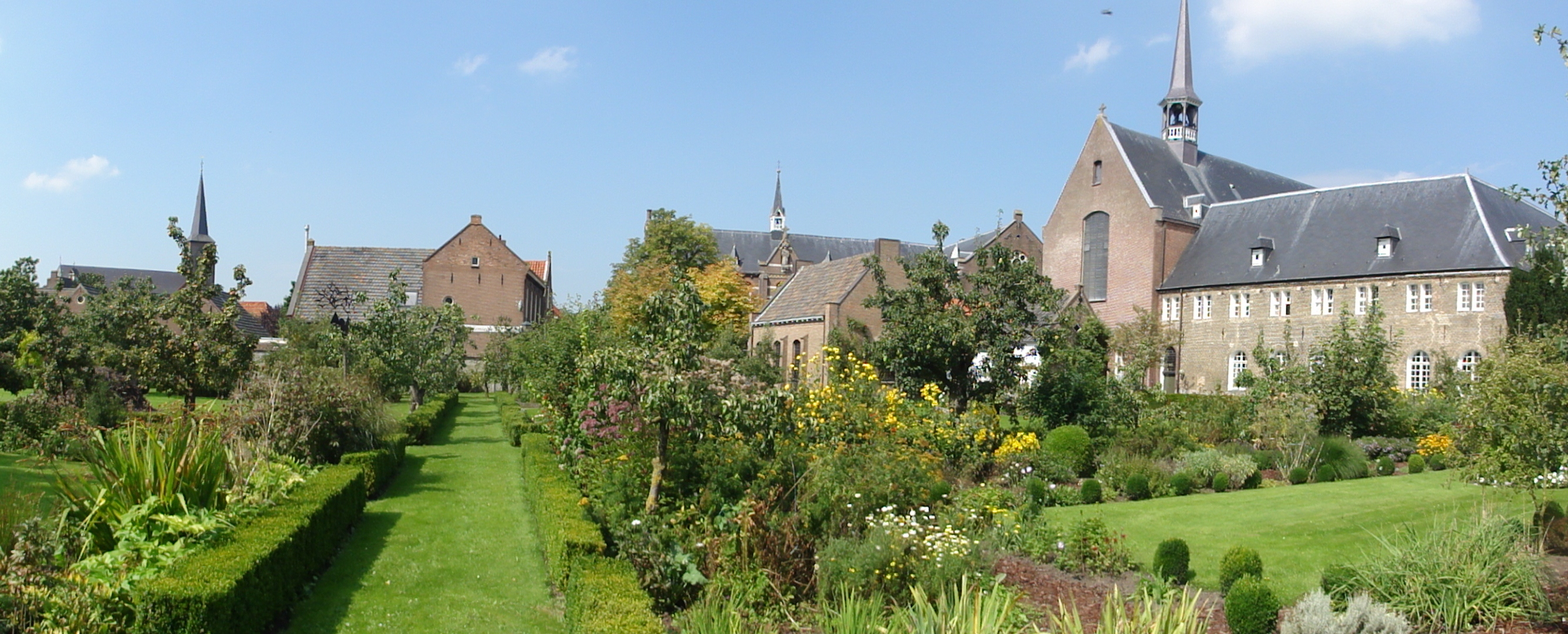
The grounds of the Franciscan friary in Megen where Brandsma did his high school studies

Brandsma was born Anno Sjoerd Brandsma to Titus Brandsma (died 1920) and his wife Tjitsje Postma (died 1933) at Oegeklooster, near Hartwerd, in the Province of Friesland in 1881. His parents, who ran a small dairy farm, were devout and committed Catholics, a minority in a predominantly Calvinist region. With the exception of one daughter, all of their children (three daughters and two sons) entered religious orders.

From the age of 11, Brandsma pursued his secondary studies in the town of Megen, at a Franciscan-run minor seminary for boys considering a priestly or religious vocation.

== Carmelite friar ==
Brandsma entered the novitiate of the Carmelite friars in Boxmeer on 17 September 1898, where he took the religious name "Titus" (in honour of his father) by which he is now known. He professed his first vows in October 1899.

Ordained a priest in 1905, Brandsma was knowledgeable in Carmelite mysticism and was awarded a doctorate of philosophy from Pontifical Gregorian University in Rome in 1909. From 1909 to 1923 he lived in Oss and worked as a writer and teacher. From 1916 on, he initiated and led a project to translate the works of Teresa of Ávila into Dutch. In 1919 he founded and for two years acted as head of a secondary school in Oss—the present day Titus Brandsma Lyceum.

In 1921, Brandsma worked to resolve a controversy concerning Belgian artist Albert Servaes' depiction of the Stations of the Cross. From this came his series of meditations on each of the 14 stations.

One of the founders of the Catholic University of Nijmegen (now Radboud University), Brandsma became a professor of philosophy and the history of mysticism at the school in 1923. He later served as rector magnificus (1932–33). He was noted for his constant availability to everyone, rather than for his scholarly work as a professor. Brandsma also worked as a journalist and was the ecclesiastical adviser to Catholic journalists by 1935. He stayed at the friary of Our Lady of Mount Carmel Kinsale, where he practiced English. That same year he traveled for a lecture tour of the United States and Canada, speaking at various institutions of his order. On the occasion of his visit to a Carmelite seminary in Niagara Falls, Ontario, Brandsma wrote of the falls that "I not only see the riches of the nature of the water, its immeasurable potentiality; I see God working in the work of his hands and the manifestation of his love."

== Imprisonment and death ==
After the invasion of the Netherlands by the Third Reich in May 1940, Brandsma's long-term fight against the spread of Nazi ideology and for educational and press freedom brought him to the attention of the Nazis.

In January 1942 he undertook to deliver by hand a letter from the Conference of Dutch Bishops to the editors of Catholic newspapers in which the bishops ordered them not to print official Nazi documents, as was required under a new law by the German occupiers. He had visited fourteen editors before being arrested on 19 January at the Boxmeer monastery.

After being held prisoner in Scheveningen, Amersfoort, and Cleves, Brandsma was transferred to the Dachau concentration camp, arriving there on 19 June. His health quickly gave way, and he was transferred to the camp hospital. He died on 26 July 1942, from a lethal injection administered by a nurse of the Allgemeine SS, as part of their program of medical experimentation on the prisoners.

== Veneration and canonization ==
Brandsma is honoured as a martyr within the Catholic Church. He was beatified in November 1985 by Pope John Paul II. His feast day is observed within the Carmelite order on 27 July.

On 25 November 2021, Pope Francis recognized a miracle attributed to the intercession of Brandsma, who "was killed in hatred of the faith", and authorized the Congregation for the Causes of Saints to advance Brandsma's cause for sainthood.

On 4 March 2022, a papal consistory opened the way for his canonization and set the date of the canonization ceremony to 15 May 2022, together with Charles de Foucauld and eight others.

On Sunday, 15 May 2022, in front of more than 50,000 people from around the world, Pope Francis canonized Brandsma and nine other saints at a Mass in St. Peter's Square in Vatican City.

"It is good to see that, through their evangelical witness, these Saints have fostered the spiritual and social growth of their respective nations and also of the entire human family", Pope Francis said during the Mass.

== Legacy ==
In 2005, Brandsma was chosen by the inhabitants of Nijmegen as the greatest citizen to have lived there. A memorial church dedicated to him now stands in the city.

Brandsma's studies on mysticism were the basis for the establishment in 1968 of the Titus Brandsma Institute in Nijmegen, dedicated to the study of spirituality. It is a collaboration between the Dutch Carmelite friars and Radboud University Nijmegen.

In his biography of Brandsma, The Man behind the Myth, Dutch journalist Ton Crijnen claims that Brandsma's character consisted of some vanity, a short temper, extreme energy, political innocence, true charity, unpretentious piety, thorough decisiveness, and great personal courage. His ideas were very much those of his own age and modern as well. He offset contemporary Catholicism's negative theological opinion about Judaism with a strong disaffection for any kind of antisemitism in Hitler's Germany.

Brandsma was honoured by the city of Dachau with a street adjoining the former camp, albeit one of the narrowest streets in the town.

Brandsma participated in the international Esperanto movement and is considered a patron saint by the International Union of Catholic Esperantists.

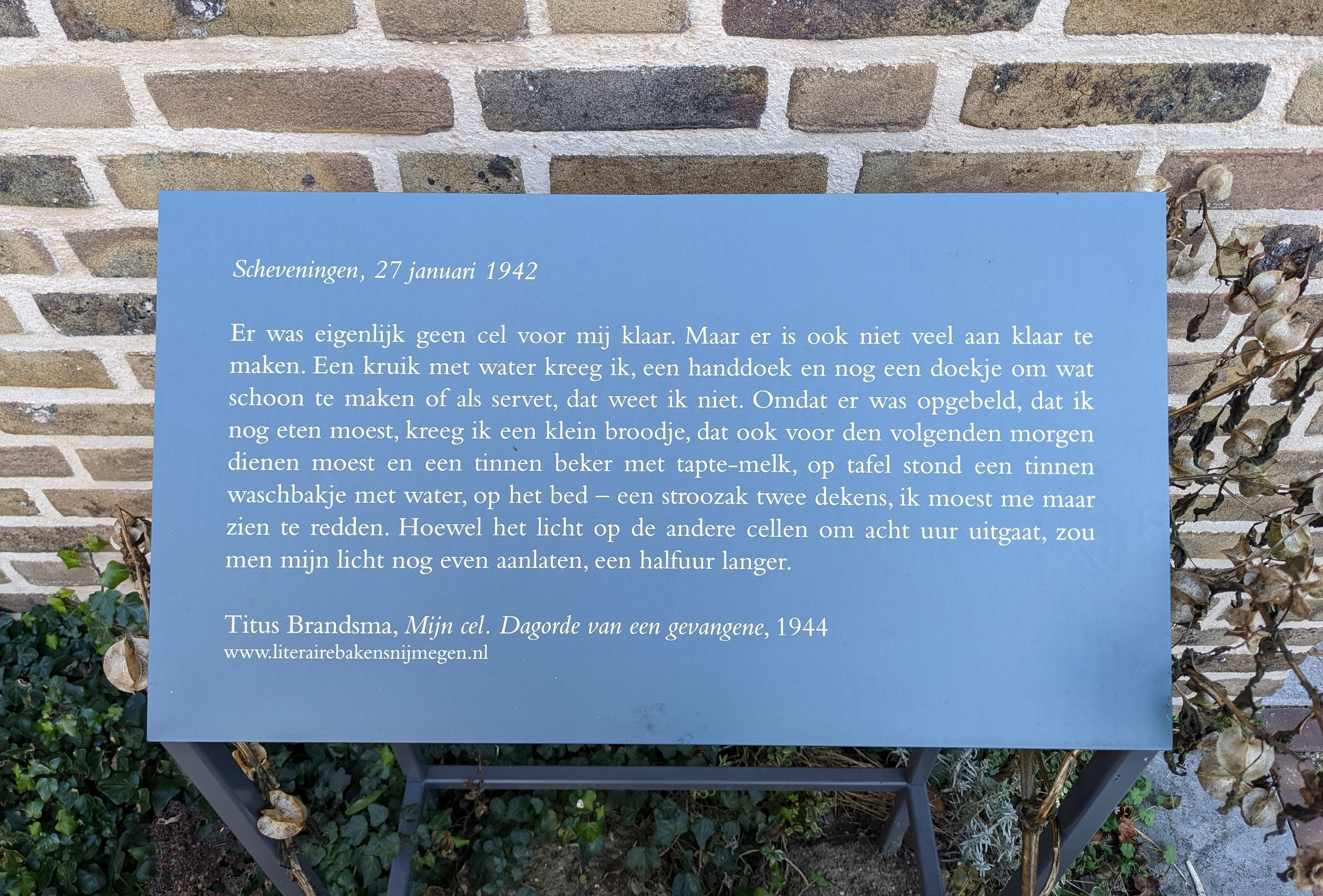
Wall poem in Nijmegen

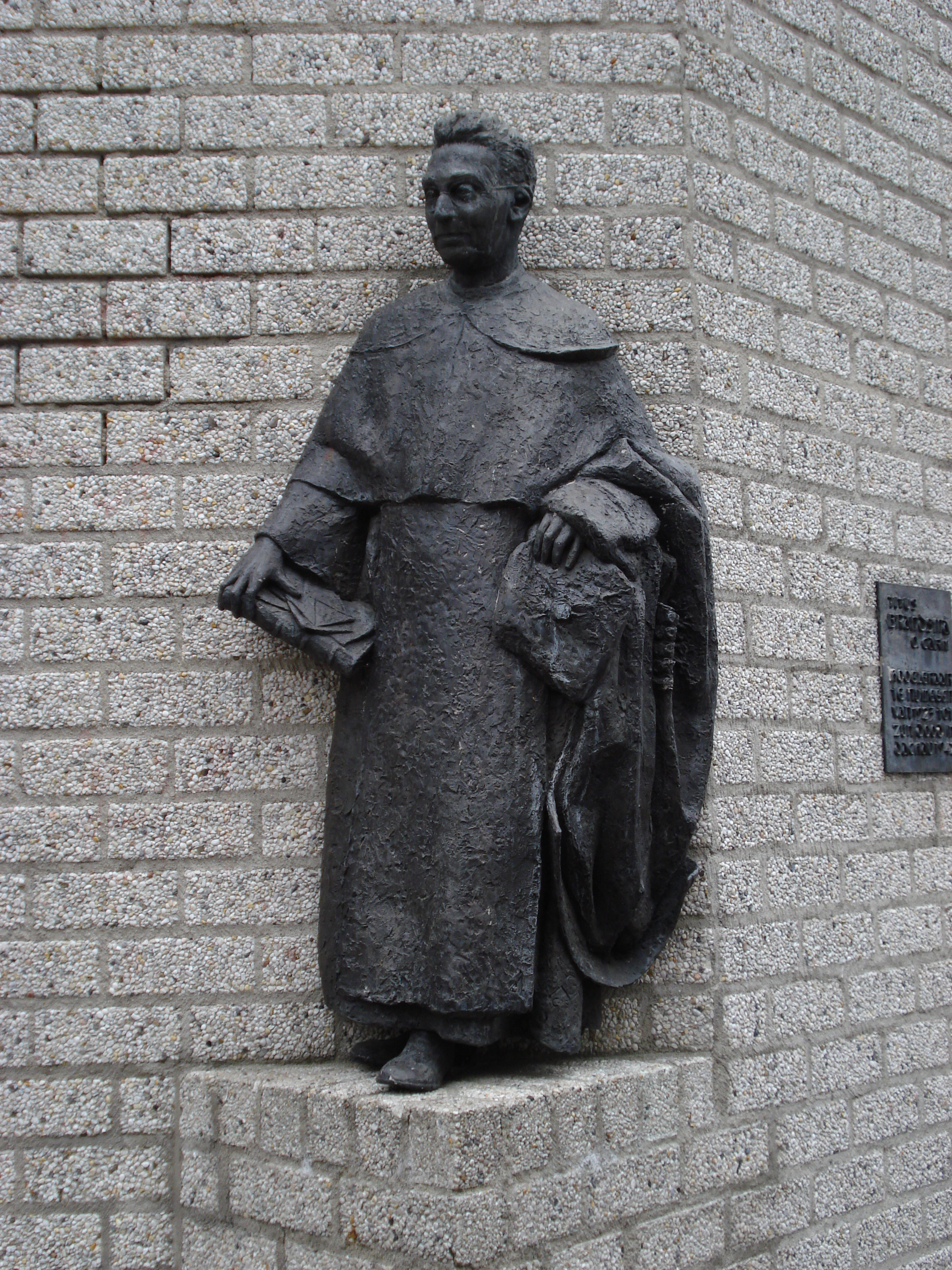
Statue of Brandsma on the grounds of Radboud University, Nijmegen

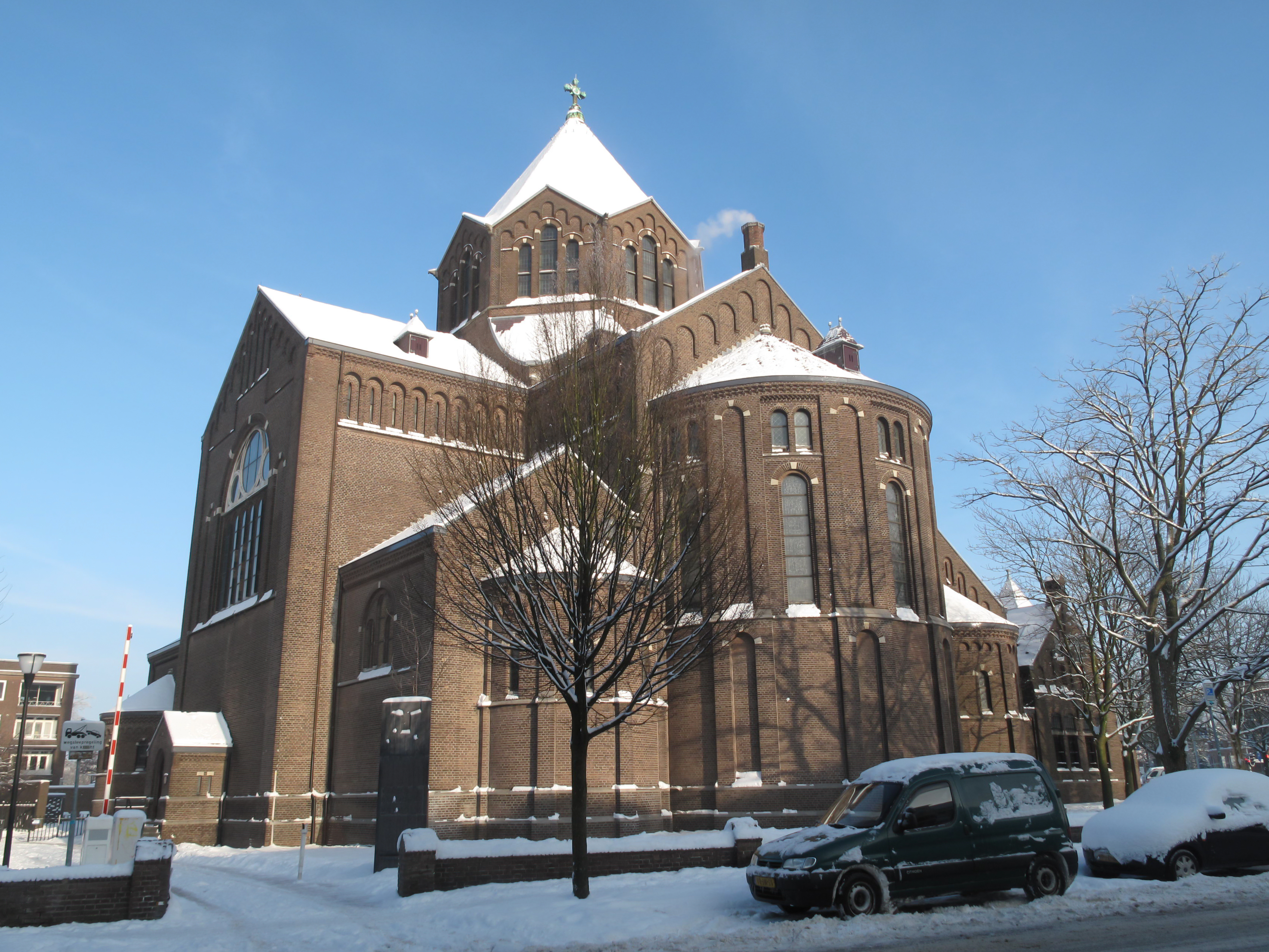
The Titus Brandsma Memorial Church in Nijmegen

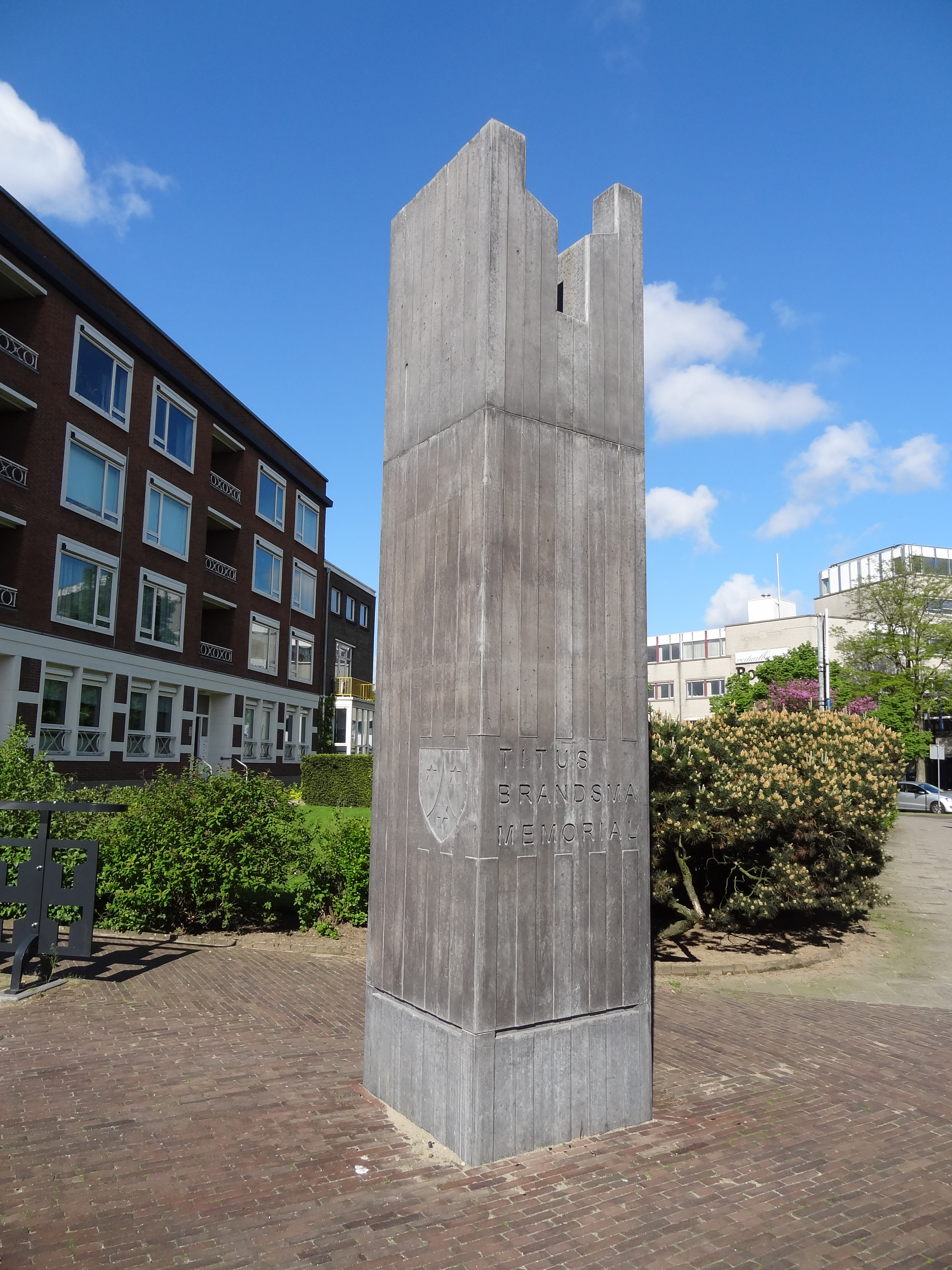
One of the gatekeepers at the Titus Brandsma Memorial (Nijmegen)

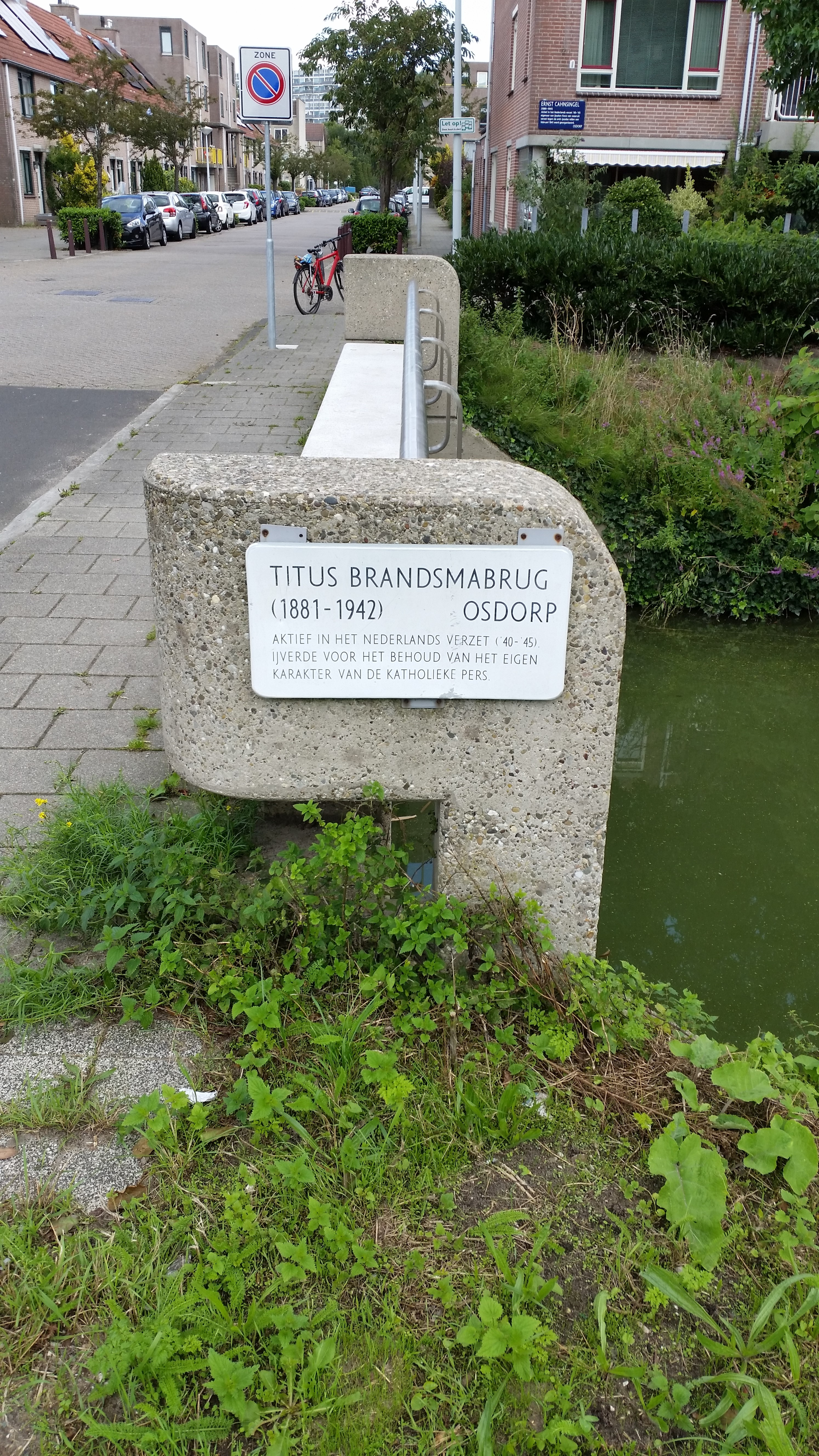
The Titus Brandsma brug in Amsterdam Nieuw-West

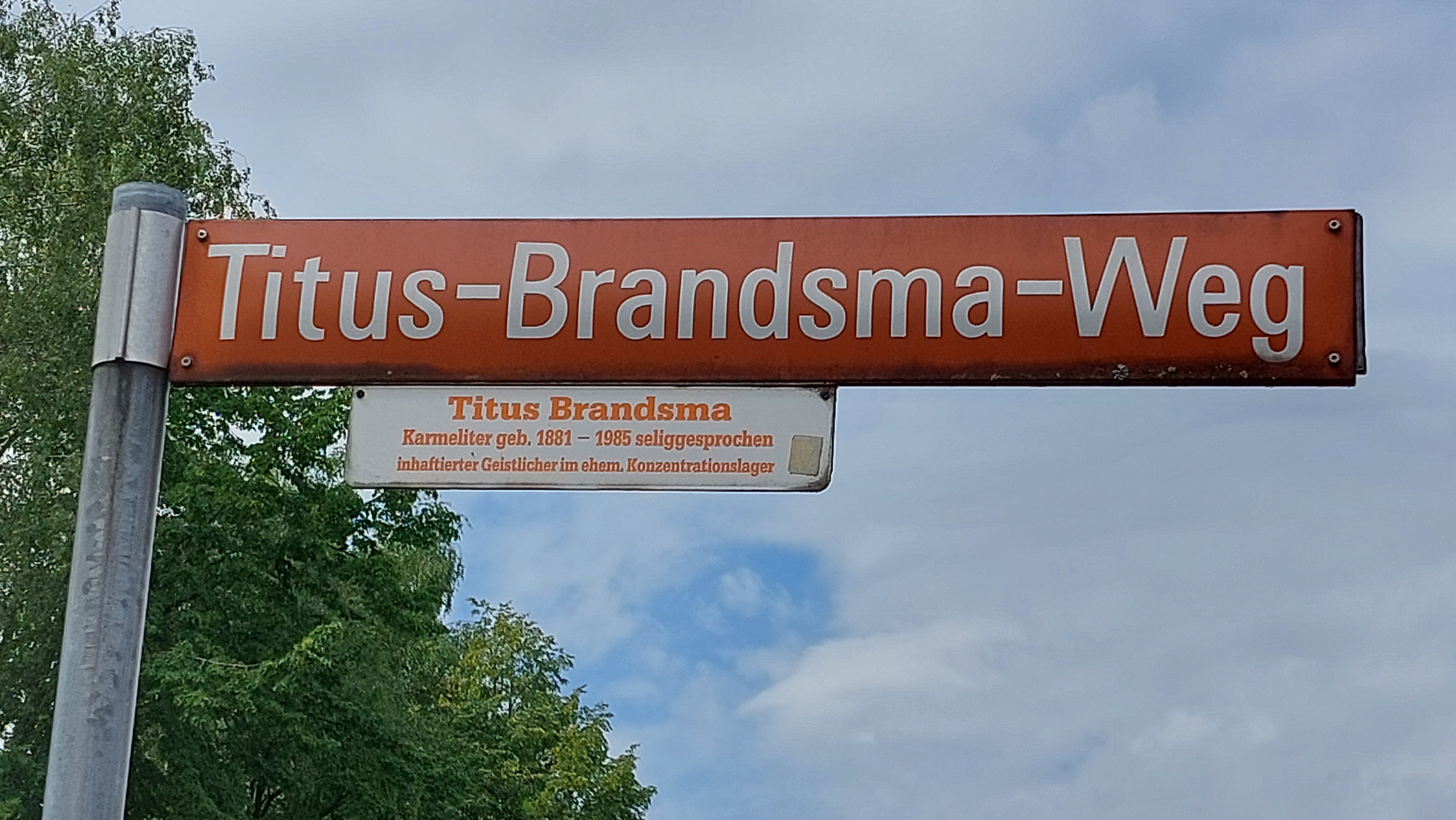
The Titus-Brandsma-Weg in Dachau

== Bibliography ==
- Brandsma, Titus. Carmelite Mysticism Historical Sketches. Darien, IL: Carmelite Press, 2002.
- Brandsma, Titus, and Albert Servaes. Ecce Homo: Schouwen van de weg van liefde/Contemplating the Way of Love. Edited by Jos Huls. Leuven: Peeters, 2003.
- Brandsma, Titus. "Why do the Dutch people, especially the Catholic people, resist the N.S.B.?" (1942) Translated from Dutch by Susan Verkerk-Wheatley / Anne-Marie Bos.

== Sources ==
- Blessed Titus Bransdma (leaflet): The Friars, Aylesford, Kent, UK.
- Clarke, Hugh. Titus Brandsma (Pamphlet). London: Catholic Truth Society, 1985.
- Dölle, Constant. Encountering God in the Abyss: Titus Brandsma's Spiritual Journey. Translated by John Vriend. Leuven: Peeters, 2002.
