= Titus (dinosaur) =

Dinosaur specimen

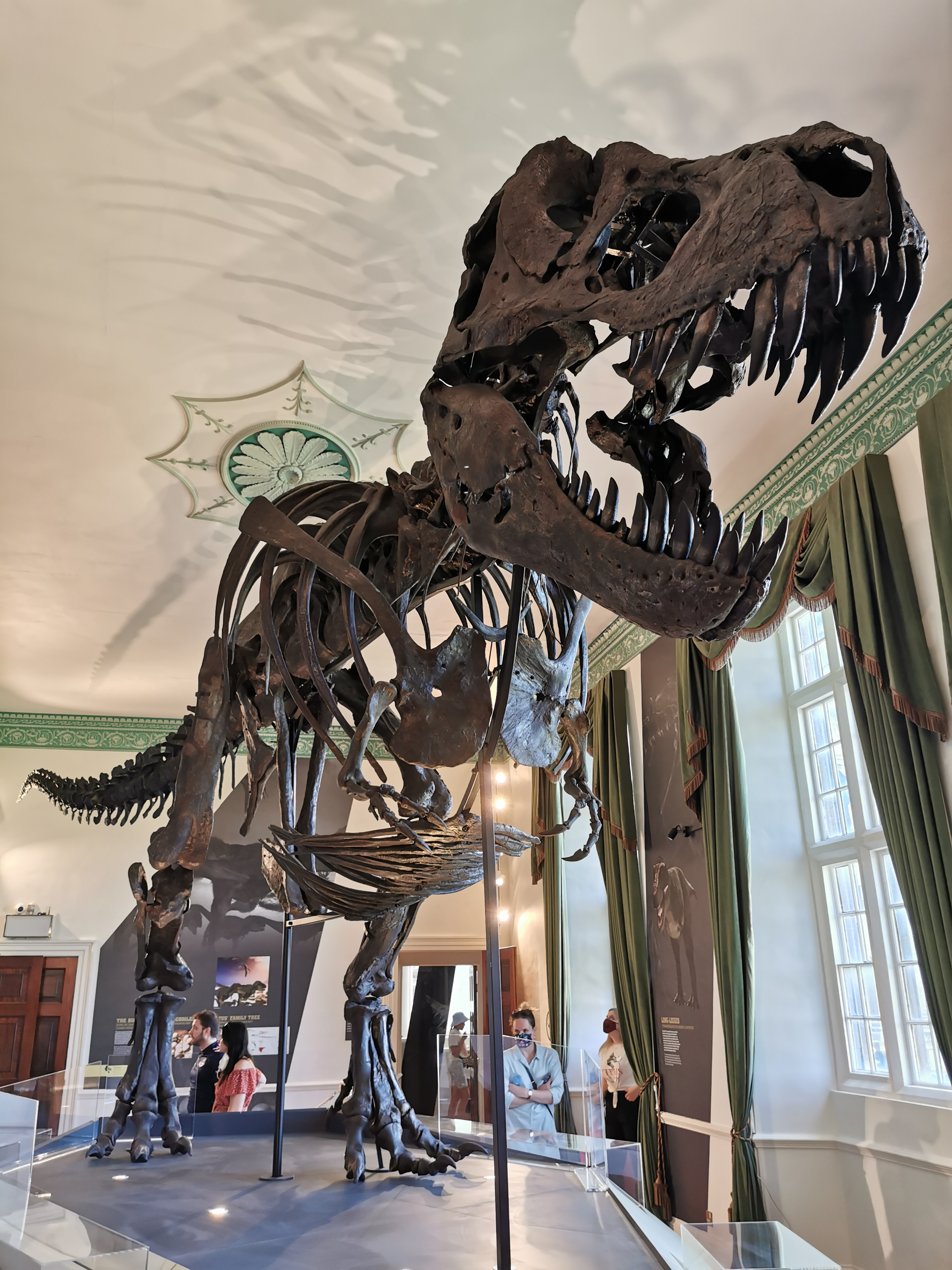
- Titus on display at Nottingham Natural History Museum on July 21, 2021
- Catalog no.: The original fossil is in private hands. Casts of the fossils are accessioned in the Nottingham Natural History Museum as NCMG 2021–7
- Common name: Titus
- Species: Tyrannosaurus rex
- Age: c. 66.5 million years
- Place discovered: Montana, United States
- Date discovered: September 2014
- Discovered by: Craig Pfister

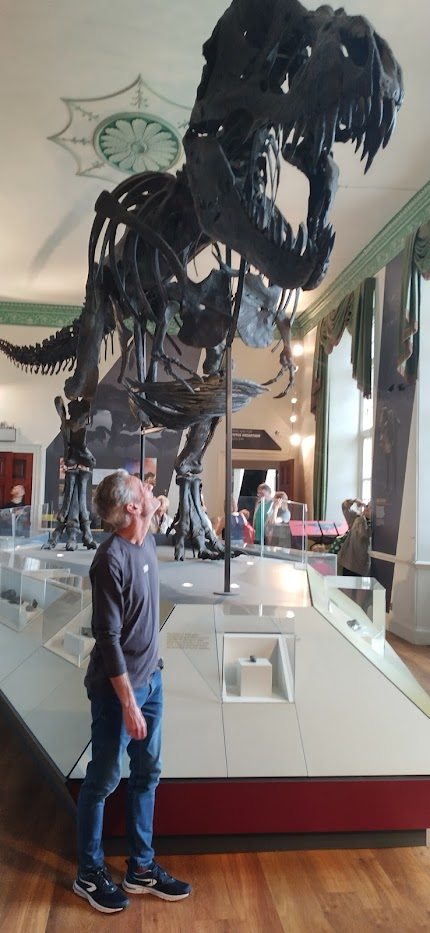
Size comparison and view from the front

Titus is an obsidian black skeleton of a Tyrannosaurus rex discovered in the Hell Creek Formation, Montana, United States in 2014 and excavated in 2018.

Titus was on display as the centrepiece of an exhibition at the Nottingham Natural History Museum, England, from July 2021 to August 2022. According to the Nottingham City Council, it is also a rare instance of an actual Tyrannosaurus fossil leaving North America. The exhibit includes 3D scanned replicas of the skeleton, which visitors can inspect and handle. He is named after the protagonist in Shakespeare's Titus Andronicus. The owner of Titus remains anonymous.

== Description ==
The mounted Titus skeleton measures 4 metres (13 ft) high and 11 metres (36 ft) long. It is named after the protagonist in Shakespeare's Titus Andronicus. The skeleton comprises 59 preserved elements, representing about 20% of the bones in an adult T. rex. External bone inspection has revealed injuries to Titus' right tibia (possibly a claw or bite wound); a deformed toe on the right foot; and a bitten and healed tail. The bite wound near the end of the tail indicates a possible attack by another Tyrannosaurus.

== Discovery ==
In September 2014, commercial paleontologist Craig Pfister first discovered the remains of Titus near Ekalaka, Carter County, Montana. The site was an ancient river channel where the specimen may have been moved in a flood event which also winnowed the skeleton and may in part explain why only 20% of the bones were preserved. Pfister originally found a broken tibia, and said he knew right away that it belonged to a Tyrannosaurus rex, but was sidetracked by the discovery of a nearby Triceratops. Excavation of the specimen began in 2018, and took 18 months.

== Reconstruction and exhibition ==
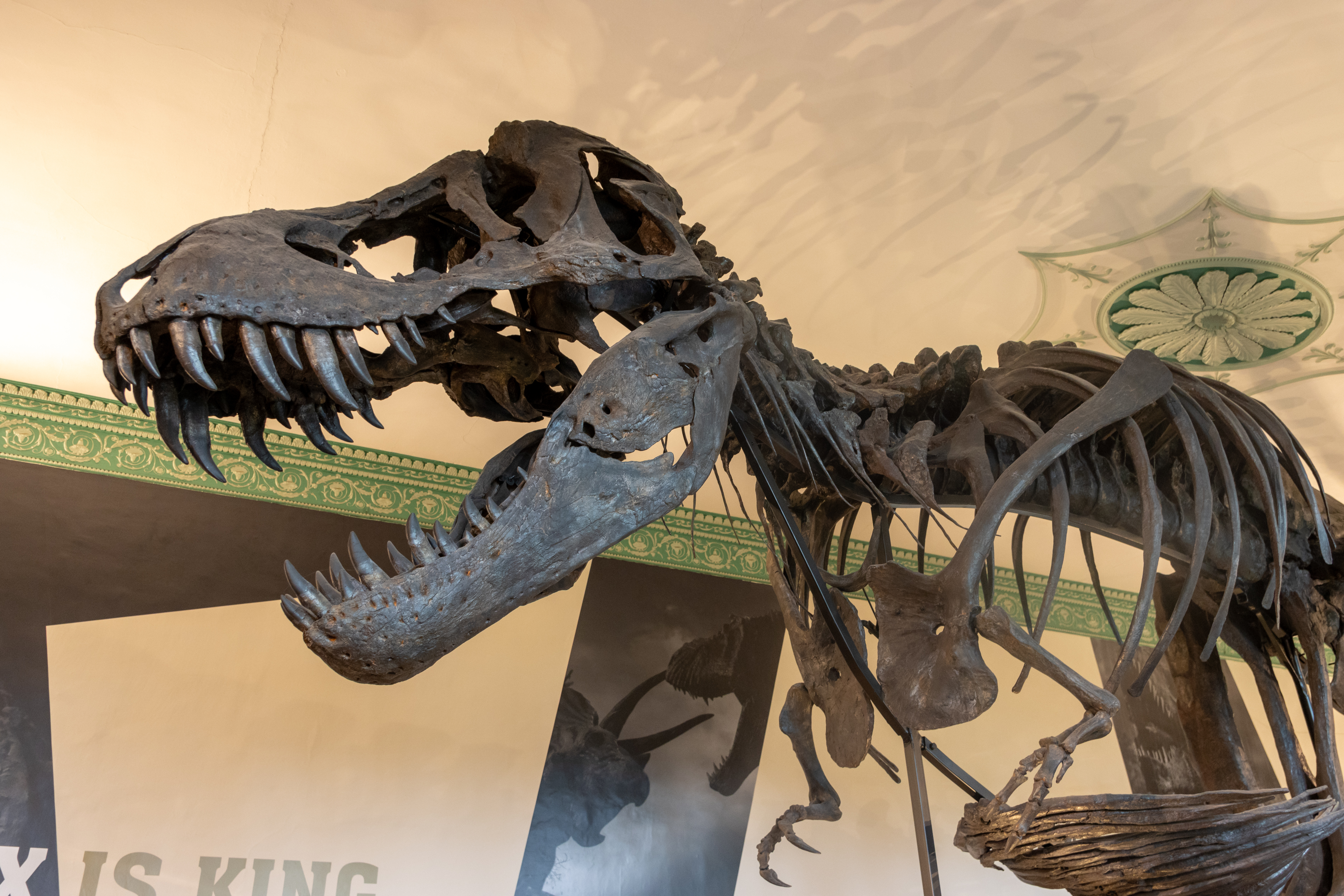
Titus at Wollaton Hall in 2023

The bones of Titus were shipped to conservationist Nigel Larkin in the United Kingdom, who assessed and conserved the bones. Larkin reconstructed the mount using a cast of the Tyrannosaurus specimen Stan to supplement the known bones of "Titus", after scanning the bones using photogrammetry to create digital models that were 3D printed in gypsum for use in the exhibition, alongside the display of the real fossil skeleton. For the exhibit at the Nottingham Natural History Museum at Wollaton Hall, Titus was reconstructed "in a walking mode, perhaps searching for prey or returning home after a hunt." The exhibition, titled "Titus: T. Rex is King", ran from 3 July 2021 to August 2022.

According to the museum, this is the first time that a "real" fossilised Tyrannosaurus rex has been shown in England for more than 100 years. (Note: According to the National Geographic, the T. rex specimen Trix went on display briefly in Glasgow, Scotland, in the summer of 2019. In England, the holotype of Dynamosaurus imperiosus, now regarded as a specimen of T. rex, is accessioned at the Natural History Museum, London, where only the lower jaw is on display.) According to the Nottingham city council, it is also a rare instance of an actual Tyrannosaurus fossil leaving North America.

== See also ==
- Specimens of Tyrannosaurus
- Timeline of tyrannosaur research
