= Tita Neire =

Mountain in Switzerland

- Location within Switzerland

Highest point
- Elevation: 3,175 m (10,417 ft)
- Prominence: 18 m (59 ft)
- Coordinates: 45°57′50″N 07°03′53.7″E

Geography
- Location: Switzerland
- Parent range: Mont Blanc Massif

The Tita Neire is a mountain of the Mont Blanc massif, located west of La Fouly in the canton of Valais.
