= Tita (surname) =

Tita or Tiță is a Romanian surname that may refer to the following notable people:

- Florin Tița (fl. 2019), Romanian Greco-Roman wrestler
- Mohamed Hassan Tita (fl. 1995–2001), Egyptian Islamic Jihad
- Ruggero Tita (born 1992), Italian sailor
- Ștefan Tita (1905–1977), Romanian writer and politician
- Valeriu Tița (born 1966), Romanian football coach and player
- Vasile Tiță (1928–2013), Romanian boxer
