= Cliff Titus =

American politician

Member of the Missouri Senate from the 28th district
- In office elected 1930 – ?

Personal details
- Born: July 6, 1890 Fairfield, Nebraska, US
- Died: March 8, 1988 (aged 97)
- Party: Republican
- Spouse: Mable V. Stephenson
- Occupation: politician, chaplain

Cliff Titus (July 6, 1890 - March 8, 1988) was an American politician from Joplin, Missouri, who served in the Missouri Senate. During World War I, he served as a chaplain in the 14th Infantry, ranked as a first lieutenant. In 1921, he began serving as a chaplain with the rank of captain in the Missouri National Guard.
