= Silas Titus =

Colonel Silas Titus

Silas Titus (May 30, 1811 – October 4, 1899) was a military officer who fought in the American Civil War in the Union Army. He was active in the organization of the city of Syracuse, New York, and served as an alderman for two years and as a supervisor in 1865. He was influential in the construction of the first 30 miles of continuous railroad in the United States.

== Early life and career ==
Silas Titus was born May 30, 1811, in Wolcott, New York. His father, Stephen Titus, and his mother, Sarah, died when he was only three years old. His uncle, Platt Titus, wrapped him in a blanket and carried him on horseback to his farm in Cato, New York. In 1827, when 16 years old, Titus left his uncle's farm and was hired as a clerk at the general store of W. S. Inghams at Cato. In the same year, he was also commissioned as Deputy Post Master of Cato. He worked at the store until 1832, when he moved to Detroit, Michigan, to look for a job with $50 in his pocket. He was successful in finding work, and in 1833, he went into business for himself.

Silas Titus and Family circa 1858; L to R Silas Wright Titus, Silas, Mary, Eliza and Robert

In 1835, Titus took a stagecoach to New York City, travelling through Buffalo and Albany. While in Albany, he saw the first railroad in New York, which ran from Schenectady to Albany. Impressed by the new technology, he organized a town meeting upon his return to Detroit that approved the building of a railroad from Detroit to Ypsilanti, Michigan. Titus became one of the commissioners of the Detroit and Shiawasse Railroad Company which was responsible for the first continuous 30 mile stretch of railroad in the United States.

In 1837 Titus married Eliza McCarthy, daughter of Thomas McCarthy and Percy Soule. Bishop John DuBois, of New York City, traveled to Salina near Syracuse, to perform the marriage even though Titus was a Seventh-day Adventist. The marriage certificate became the first catholic record in Onondaga County. The young priest accompanying the Bishop as a sherpa was John McCloskey, the first Archbishop of New York to be created cardinal. Titus returned to New York in 1840 and settled in Salina. He went into business with Dennis McCarthy, operating a general store for ten years. In 1850, he was appointed by the Supervisors of Onondaga Co. to the position of Superintendent of the Penitentiary, a position he held for seven years, after which he went into the lumber business with McCarthy. He stayed in the lumber business until 1861 and the beginning of the American Civil War.

== Civil War ==
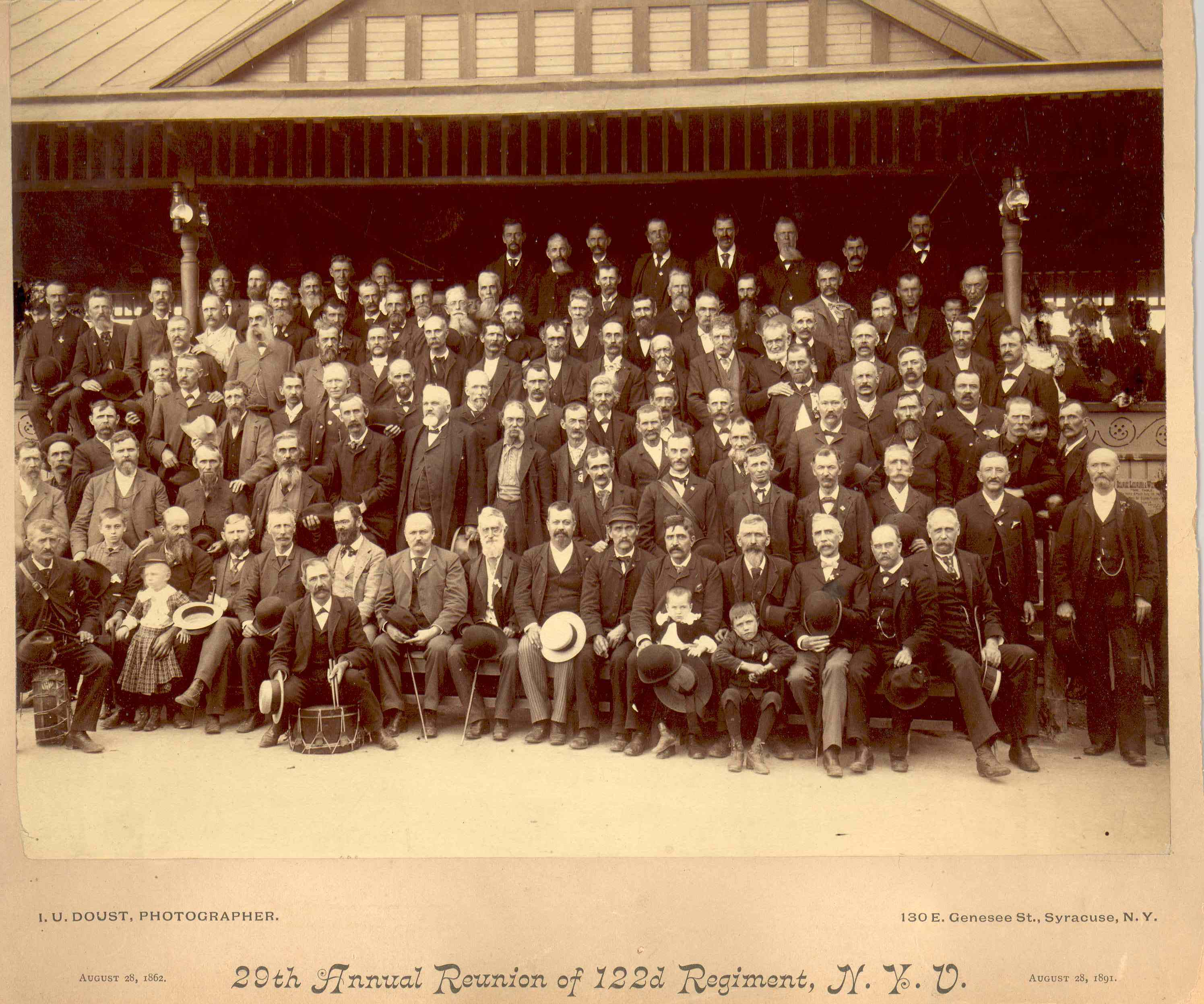
122 New York Volunteer Regiment reunion

Silas Titus enlisted on May 13, 1861, as a first lieutenant and was commissioned into the Field and Staff of the 12th New York State Volunteers (also known as the "First Onondaga Regiment"). Titus served as the regimental adjutant. By September 1861, he had been transferred to the staff of Brig. Gen. John J. Peck, who commanded a brigade in the guarding of Chain Bridge and Tennallytown, Washington, D.C., before being promoted to commanding colonel of the 122nd New York - Third Onondaga Regiment on August 22, 1862.

The regiment was rushed to Washington to prepare to advance on the Confederacy. At 4 o'clock the morning following the 12th NY's arrival in Washington, President Abraham Lincoln and U.S. Secretary of State William Seward drove out to the camp of the 12th in a carriage. The President personally thanked the officers of the 12th New York, saying, "I'm glad to see you here boys". He then shook the hand of every soldier in the regiment.

The regiment moved out of the Washington camp to Fort Albany, Virginia, where it stayed until July 1861, when it advanced on the enemy at the First Battle of Bull Run at Manassas. The 12th New York took light casualties in the battle, including the first man killed in action in the Army of the Potomac. After the battle, the regiment retreated to Washington with the rest of the Union army to regroup. Soon after Bull Run, Titus was made Adjutant of General John J. Peck's staff, a position he held until the Battle of Seven Pines in June 1862.

In July 1862, Titus took a leave of absence due to poor health and returned to his home in Syracuse. While he was recovering at home, he was appointed colonel of the newly formed 122nd New York State Volunteer Regiment by the governor of New York. The 122nd regiment joined the Army of the Potomac in September 1862 at Sharpsburg on the final day of the Battle of Antietam. Three months after Antietam, with Titus in command, the 122nd found themselves supporting the Pennsylvania Reserves in the assault on Fredericksburg Heights. The regiment spent four hours under artillery fire with only four men wounded at the end of the day.

In the summer of 1863, the 122nd New York was part of the First Brigade, Third Division, Sixth Corps. The night of July 1, the 6th Corps marched from Manchester along the Baltimore Pike towards Gettysburg. As the regiment crossed the Pennsylvania - Maryland line, the regimental flag unfurled to the breeze and the drum corps played "Yankee Doodle". At about 4 o'clock the corps reached the Gettysburg battlefield where they were held in reserve for the night to allow the tired troops some much needed sleep. With Titus in command, the regiment was engaged in the Battle of Gettysburg on the Morning of July 3 on the north side of the battlefield in the area of Cemetery Hill and Culps Hill. In the afternoon of July 3 the 122nd NY was held in reserve behind the Union right during Pickett's Charge.

Shortly after Gettysburg, Titus was ordered to serve as Provost Marshal of the General Court Marshal in Trenton, New Jersey. After serving one year as a member of the court-martial, he resigned and returned to Syracuse. At the Battle of Williamsburg, a Virginia State flag was captured by Peck's Brigade and was kept by Colonel Titus for several years after the war. Col. Titus' son Silas Wright Titus took the flag back to Virginia and presented it to "those entitled to receive it".

Silas Titus 1898

During the war, Titus was a regular correspondent to the Syracuse Daily Courier & Union newspaper, where, under the nom de plume Scimetar, he wrote several lively letters concerning the war under the heading 'On the Warpath'.

== Postbellum activities ==
In the late 1890s, Titus lived with his son Silas Wright Titus in Brooklyn, New York. In 1899, a fire was caused in his son's home by Colonel Titus smoking on the couch. Titus was dragged to safety by his daughter-in-law; however, he died two weeks later on October 4. He is buried along with his wife, Eliza, and two of his three children in St. Agnes Cemetery in Syracuse.
