= William A. Titus =

American politician

William Albert Titus (August 30, 1868 – February 2, 1951) was an American businessman, educator, writer, historian, and politician.

Born in Empire, Wisconsin, Titus went to the University of Chicago and University of Wisconsin–Madison and taught high school. As a businessman, he helped organize the Standard Lime and Stone company of Fond du Lac WI and served as its secretary-treasurer (1902-1920) and president (1920-1940). He also helped organize a savings and loan company. Titus was a historian and writer and was involved with the Wisconsin Historical Society. Titus served in the Wisconsin State Senate from 1921 to 1928. He died in Fond du Lac, Wisconsin.
