= Cold Springs, Nevada =

Cold Springs is the name of multiple locations in the U.S. state of Nevada:

- Cold Springs, Churchill County, Nevada, an unincorporated community
  - Cold Springs Pony Express Station Ruins, a historic stagecoach station
  - Cold Springs Station Site, a historic stagecoach station
- Cold Springs, Washoe County, Nevada, a census-designated place

== See also ==
- Cold Spring (disambiguation)
