= Cold Spring =

Cold Spring, Cold Springs, Coldspring, or Coldsprings may refer to:

== Places ==
=== Canada ===
- Cold Springs, Manitoulin District, Ontario
- Cold Springs, Northumberland County, Ontario
- Coldspring House, British Columbia, Canada (also known as Coldspring)

=== United States ===
- Cold Spring (Waldron, Arkansas), listed on the NRHP in Arkansas
- Cold Spring, former name of Cold Springs, El Dorado County, California
- Cold Spring Canyon Arch Bridge, California
- Cold Spring, Kentucky
- Cold Springs, Michigan
- Cold Spring, Minnesota
- Cold Spring, New Jersey
  - Cold Spring Grange Hall, listed on the NRHP in Cape May County, New Jersey
  - Cold Spring Presbyterian Church, listed on the NRHP in Cape May County, New Jersey
  - Historic Cold Spring Village
- Cold Spring, New York
  - Cold Spring (Metro-North station)
- Cold Spring, Tennessee
- Cold Spring, Wisconsin, a town
  - Cold Spring (community), Wisconsin, an unincorporated community
- Cold Spring (Shepherdstown, West Virginia), a house listed on the National Register of Historic Places
- Cold Springs, El Dorado County, California
- Cold Springs, Tuolumne County, California
- Cold Springs, Indiana
- Cold Springs, Churchill County, Nevada, an unincorporated community
- Cold Springs, Washoe County, Nevada, a census-designated place
- Cold Springs, Buffalo, a neighborhood in Buffalo, New York
- Cold Springs Station Site in Lander County, Nevada
- Cold Springs Rancheria of Mono Indians of California in Fresno County, California
- Coldspring, New York
- Coldspring, Texas
- Coldsprings Township, Michigan

=== Taiwan ===
- Su'ao Cold Spring

== Schools ==
- Cold Springs High School in Bremen, Alabama
- Cold Springs Middle School, in the Washoe County School District in Washoe County, Nevada

== Other uses ==
- Cold Spring (label), an independent record label based in Northamptonshire, England
- Coldspring (company), a United States quarrier, fabricator, and manufacturer (formerly known as Cold Spring Granite)
- Cold Springs Pegram Truss Railroad Bridge in Blaine County, Idaho
- Cold Springs Cemetery in the town of Lockport, New York

== See also ==
- Cold Spring Farm (disambiguation)
- Cold Spring Harbor (disambiguation)
