= CSH =

CSH (or its styling variants Csh or csh) is a three-letter acronym with multiple meanings:

== Locations ==
- Cecil Sharp House, home of the English Folk Dance and Song Society
- Chartwell Seniors Housing, a real estate investment trust in Canada
- Cold Spring Harbor Laboratory, a genetics laboratory in Cold Spring Harbor
- Cold Spring Harbor, New York, a town on Long Island
  - See also Cold Spring Harbor (disambiguation)

== Medicine, science and technology ==
- Caesium hydride, a crystalline solid with the molecular formula CsH
- C-S-H, calcium silicate hydrate, or calcium silicate hydrogel, the main component of hardened cement paste: the glue phase in hardened Portland cement
- C shell, a Unix shell
- Combat Support Hospital, a type of military field hospital
- Context-sensitive help, method of providing online help
- Complexity Science Hub
- CSH Protocols, an on-line scientific journal for biologists
- Photoshop Custom Shape Object, a file format for use with Adobe Systems' Photoshop

== Transport ==
- Carshalton railway station, London, National Rail station code CSH
- Cycle Superhighways, a bicycle route scheme in London
- Shanghai Airlines, ICAO airline designator CSH

== Other ==
- Asho Chin language (ISO 639-3 code)
- Canadian Subject Headings is a list of subject headings of Canadian topics
- Case Study Houses, experiments in American residential architecture from 1945 until 1966
- Cash America International has the NYSE designator CSH
- Coalition to Save Harlem
- Code for Sustainable Homes
- Convent of the Sacred Heart (disambiguation)
- Coordination Syndicale Haïtienne (CSH), a Haitian trade union
- Council for Secular Humanism
- Sun Hei SC, a football club in Hong Kong
- Car Seat Headrest, an American band
