= Joseph Fitch =

American lawyer, politician, and judge (1857–1917)

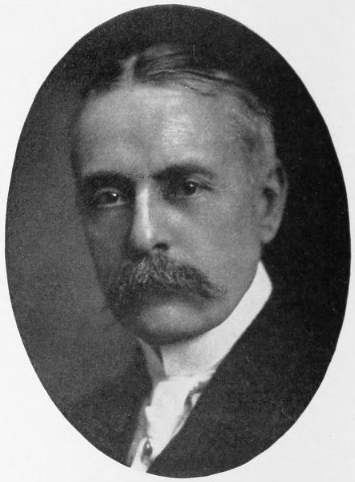

Member of the New York State Assembly from the Queens County's 1st district
- In office 1886–1887
- Preceded by: Louis K. Church
- Succeeded by: John Cashow

Personal details
- Born: August 27, 1857 Flushing, New York, U.S.
- Died: April 7, 1917 (aged 59) Brookhaven, New York, U.S.
- Party: Democratic
- Spouse: Annie Loraine Rose (m. 1886)
- Children: 2
- Education: Swarthmore College
- Occupation: Lawyer, politician, judge

Joseph Fitch (August 27, 1857 – April 7, 1917) was an American lawyer, politician, and judge from New York. He served in the New York State Assembly from 1886 to 1887, representing Queens County's 1st District, and later served as a City Magistrate.

== Early life ==
Fitch was born on August 27, 1857, in Flushing, New York, the only child of businessman Joseph Fitch and Avis Leggett.

He attended the Flushing Institute and later Swarthmore College in Pennsylvania, graduating in 1879. He then studied law in the office of Charles W. Pleasants in New York City from 1881 to 1882, while also taking classes at Columbia Law School. He was admitted to the bar in 1882 and began practicing law in New York City. From 1880 to 1887, he served as Second Lieutenant of the Seventeenth Separate Company of the New York National Guard. He later became the senior member of the law firm Fitch, Moore & Swan.

== Political career ==
In 1885, Fitch was elected to the New York State Assembly as a Democrat, representing the Queens County 1st District. He served in the Assembly in 1886 and 1887. While in the Assembly, he originated and passed a bill that established the Cold Spring Harbor Fish Hatchery.

He was a member of the Flushing Board of Education from 1893 until the consolidation of Greater New York in 1898. He also served as counsel to the Flushing Village Board of Health from its organization in 1891 until consolidation. In the 1894 United States House of Representatives election, he ran unsuccessfully as a Democrat in New York's 1st congressional district.

In 1898, he was appointed Deputy Commissioner of Water Supply for the Borough of Queens. In 1905, he served as assistant District Attorney of Queens County. In 1908, he was appointed City Magistrate.

== Personal life and death ==
Fitch married Annie Loraine Rose in 1886. They had two daughters, Avis Loraine and Dorothea.

He was a member of the Freemasons, the Queens County Bar Association, the New York Law Institute, the League of American Wheelman, Phi Beta Kappa, and the New York State Bar Association. He was an Episcopalian and served as a vestryman at St. George's Church in Flushing.

Fitch died of acute indigestion on April 7, 1917, at the home of his friend Desmond Nelson in Brookhaven, where he was staying while repairs were being made to his summer home.

New York State Assembly
Preceded by Louis K. Church	New York State Assembly; Queens County, 1st District; 1886–1887	Succeeded by John Cashow
