= Solomon S. Townsend =

American politician (1850–1910)

Member of the New York State Assembly from Queens County's 3rd District
- In office 1893–1893
- Preceded by: District created
- Succeeded by: Eugene F. Vacheron

Member of the New York State Assembly from Queens County's 1st District
- In office 1889–1892
- Preceded by: John Cashow
- Succeeded by: James Robinson

Personal details
- Born: Solomon Samuel Townsend III; May 21, 1850 Manhattan, New York City, U.S.
- Died: November 18, 1910 (aged 60) Mineola, New York, U.S.
- Resting place: St. John's Church Cemetery, Laurel Hollow, New York
- Party: Democratic
- Parent: Solomon S. Townsend II (father)
- Education: New York University
- Occupation: Coal merchant, politician

Solomon Samuel Townsend III (May 21, 1850 – November 18, 1910) was an American politician from New York. He served in the New York State Assembly from 1889 to 1893, representing Queens County, and was a delegate to the 1892 Democratic National Convention.

== Early life and family ==
Townsend was born on May 21, 1850, in Manhattan, New York City. He was the son of Solomon S. Townsend II, a member of the New York State Legislature and a delegate to the 1846 and 1867 New York State Constitutional Conventions, and Helene DeKay. He was the grandson of Capt. Solomon Townsend.

He lived most of his life in Oyster Bay, where as a boy he was playmates with the Roosevelt family.

== Career ==
After graduating from the Oyster Bay Parish School and New York University, Townsend worked as a coal merchant in Oyster Bay.

== Political career ==
A Democrat, Townsend was elected to the New York State Assembly in 1888, representing Queens County's 1st District. He served in the Assembly in 1889, 1890, 1891, and 1892. He succeeded John Cashow in this seat and was succeeded by James Robinson.

In 1892, Townsend was a delegate to the 1892 Democratic National Convention in Chicago.

Following redistricting, Townsend was elected to the newly created Queens County's 3rd District in 1892 and served in the 1893 session. He was the first person to represent the new district and was succeeded by Eugene F. Vacheron.

Townsend was later appointed to be Clerk of the Queens County Board of Supervisors and Collector of Arrearages of Taxes of Queens County.

== Death ==
Townsend died on November 18, 1910, at Nassau Hospital (today NYU Winthrop Hospital) in Mineola, New York. He was buried in the Memorial Cemetery of St. John's Church in Laurel Hollow, New York.

New York State Assembly
Preceded by John Cashow	New York State Assembly; Queens County, 1st District; 1889–1892	Succeeded by James Robinson
Preceded by District created	New York State Assembly; Queens County, 3rd District; 1893	Succeeded by Eugene F. Vacheron
