= Samuel J. Burden =

American politician from New York

Member of the New York State Assembly from Queens County's 1st District
- In office 1913–1913
- Preceded by: Andrew Zorn
- Succeeded by: Peter A. Leininger

Personal details
- Party: Democratic

Samuel J. Burden was an American politician from Queens, New York. He served as a member of the New York State Assembly in 1913, representing Queens County's 1st District.

== Political career ==
Burden, a Democrat, was elected to the New York State Assembly and took his seat in the 1913 session.

He served through the 1913 session. His date of death and burial location are unknown.

New York State Assembly
Preceded by Andrew Zorn	New York State Assembly; Queens County, 1st District; 1913	Succeeded by Nicholas Nehrbauer Jr.
