= Cold Spring station =

Cold Spring station may refer to the following rail stations in the United States:

- Cold Spring station (Metro-North), a commuter rail stop on the Metro-North Railroad's Hudson Line
- Cold Springs Station Site, a historic stagecoach station site west of Austin, Nevada
- Cold Spring Lane station, a light rail station in Baltimore, Maryland
- West Cold Spring station, a Metro subway station in Baltimore, Maryland
