= Uplands Farm Nature Sanctuary =

Protected area in New York

- Location within New York
- Location: Suffolk County, New York
- Coordinates: 40.8573°N 73.4559°W
- Area: 93 acres (38 ha)
- Established: 1981

Uplands Farm Sanctuary is a 93-acre (38 ha) protected area of New York located in Cold Spring Harbor.

== History ==
Effingham Lawrence built Uplands Farm Nature Sanctuary in 1917 to manufacture wool and for sheep ranching. J. P. Morgan Jr. bought Uplands Farm in 1926 and gave it as a present to his daughter, Jane Nicholas, and son-in-law, George Nichols. Jane Nichols donated some of the land to the Nature Conservancy in the early 1970s. Eventually, when Jane Nichols died in 1981, the land was donated to the Nature Conservancy. The preserve is one of 38 on Long Island that are maintained by the Nature Conservancy.

== Features ==
The park features 2.5 mi (4.0 km) of trails. The trail reaches a maximum height of 157 ft (48 m). Additionally, many types of plants can be viewed within this preserve, including black birch, black cherry, or tulip tree.

== See also ==
- Trail View State Park – located adjacent to the site along the former right-of-way of the Caumsett State Parkway
