= The Whaling Museum & Education Center =

Maritime museum in Cold Spring Harbor, New York

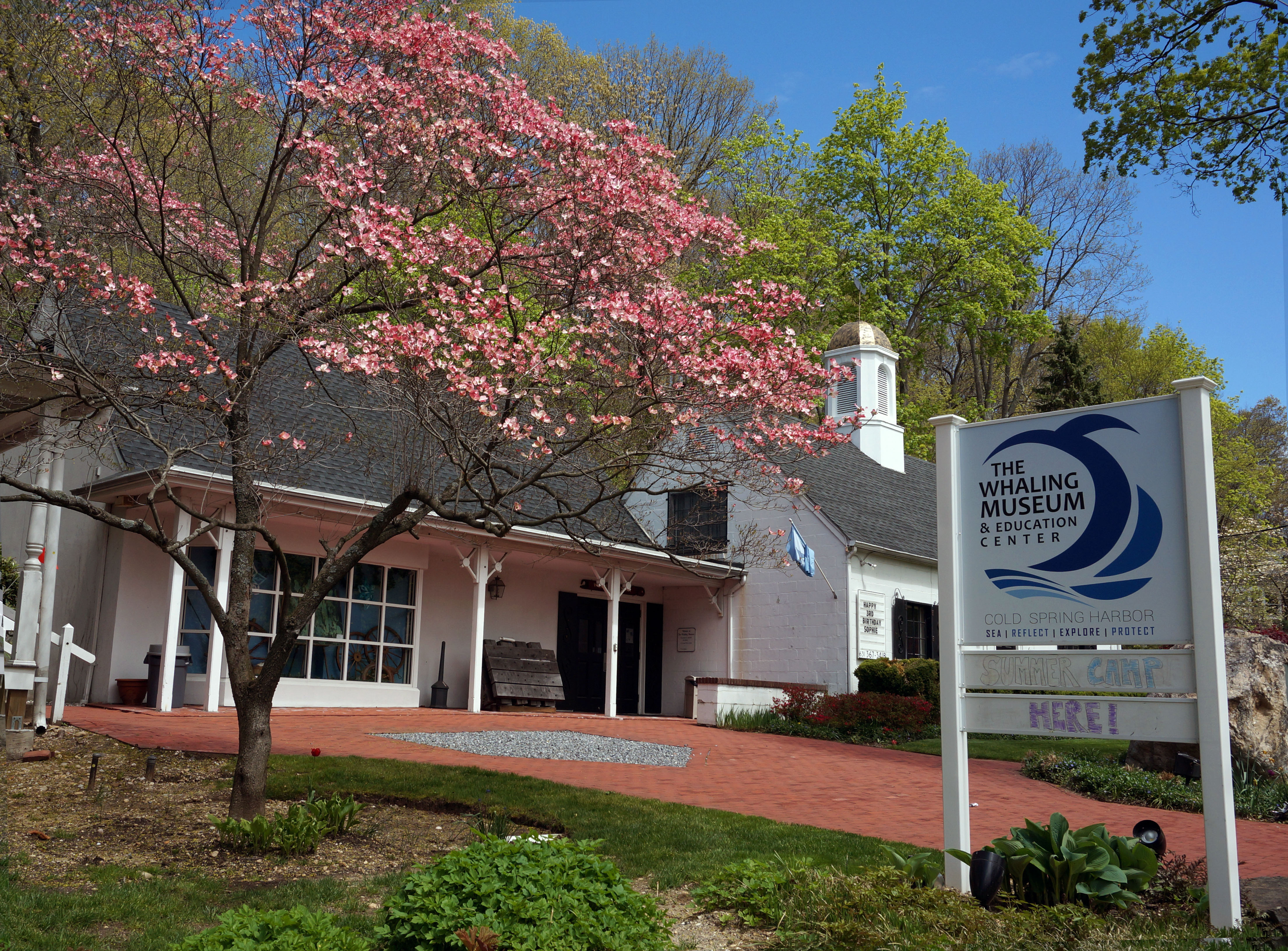
- Former name: The Whaling Museum
- Established: 1942
- Location: Cold Spring Harbor, New York
- Coordinates: 40.8725°N 73.454167°W
- Type: History museum
- Accreditation: American Alliance of Museums
- Collection size: 6,000
- Visitors: 20,000 annually
- Owner: The Whaling Museum Society
- Website: http://www.cshwhalingmuseum.org

The Whaling Museum & Education Center, formerly known as The Whaling Museum, is a maritime museum located in Cold Spring Harbor, New York dedicated to the local history, the maritime heritage of Long Island and its impact on the whaling industry.

The Museum, which welcomes about 20,000 visitors annually, is accredited by the American Alliance of Museums. The Whaling Museum Society was founded in 1936, with the Museum opening in 1942. Its exhibit space is 2,500 square feet including an educational workshop.

The museum holds about 6,000 documents and artifacts from Cold Spring Harbor and other Long Island whaling towns. Its collection includes a 19th-century whaleboat with original gear and a large collection of scrimshaw.

Additional displays include whaling implements, ship’s gear, navigational aids, ship models and maritime art. The library and archival collection contains 2,800 primary and secondary volumes and manuscript material from the Cold Spring whaling fleet, ship’s logs, journals and business correspondence of the Cold Spring Whaling Company, family documents dealing with maritime commerce on Long Island, records of the Long Island coastwise trade under sail and records from the Cold Spring Harbor Customs House (1798 until 1908).

The museum hosts educational events and exhibitions year-round, including films, lectures, performances, and special events, connecting the subject of whaling to other subjects in art, science, and culture.

== Museum collection ==
The majority of the Museum's collections were donated over time, starting as a community repository from the Museum's founding in 1936. Totaling 6,000 pieces, most pieces speak to the 19th century whaling industry, specifically Long Island whaling, as well as the local history of Cold Spring Harbor and its growth as a maritime port. The collection includes:

- Scrimshaw: 500 scrimshaw items crafted by whalers at sea including decorative pieces on teeth and tusks. The collection includes hundreds of utilitarian pieces such as sewing boxes, swifts, busks, fids, and jagging wheels.
- Whalecraft, ship gear, and navigational aids: 275 tools, including a 19th-century whaleboat from the Long Island whaleship Daisy (and the only fully equipped whaleboat with its original gear on display in New York State), with a collection of tools, trypot, figureheads, and navigational tools.
- Archives: containing 95% of the existing manuscript material from the Cold Spring Harbor whaling fleet (documenting 44 voyages of 9 ships from 1836 to 1862), including 15 ships logs, 12 journals, and business correspondence; 90% of the records from the local Customs House (1798–1908); records of the Long Island coastal trade under sail; photos of crewmembers, vessels, and ports; family scrapbooks.
- Richmond Collection: documents, letters, receipts, shipping lists, and manuscripts preserved from the Cold Spring Harbor ship Richmond, wrecked in the Bering Strait in 1849. The archive reveals the Richmond's significant history as the focus of a legal judgment in maritime salvage law. Acquired in 2012.
- Models: 12 detailed models of whaling ships, including one by the master ship model maker Henry Culver; a large diorama of Cold Spring Harbor in 1850 (48 inches × 72 inches), completed in 1970.
- Marine art: 150 paintings, lithographs, and daguerreotypes depicting whaling scenes; works by Currier & Ives, S.A. Mount, C. Ashley, W. Brandford, and watercolors of local ships by E.F. Tufnell.
- Daily life: 6 costumes, 50 whale oil lamps and candleholders, accessories, and objects of daily living in the 1850s donated by local whaling families; ship in a bottle, early 19th century glass flasks, kitchen tools, and prescription bottles.
- Natural history: 25 skeletal whale bones; 2 narwhal tusks; sperm whale jaw; orca skull; ear bones; blubber sample; other biological specimens from ocean life, including coral.
- Hewlett Collection: acquired in 1989 from the estate of John D. Hewlett including over 200 photographs, 300 pieces of correspondence pertaining to the growth of Cold Spring Harbor as a maritime community, Edward Lange landscapes, portraits by S. A. Mount of local citizens, ledgers from local industries including grist mills, saw mills, and shipyards.
- Hoie Collection: 24 whaling-themed watercolor paintings by the Long Island watercolorist Claus Hoie (1911–2007), donated to the museum in 2012.

== History of Cold Spring Harbor ==
In 1932, a small number of residents of Cold Spring Harbor, New York, commissioned a monument commemorating the village's earlier days as a whaling port. A boulder was dredged from the harbor and erected on the village square and lists the names of the nine vessels in the fleet. In later years the monument was moved to the museum's property, where it remains today.

== See also ==
- List of maritime museums in the United States
