= Cold Springs, Churchill County, Nevada =

Unincorporated community in Nevada, US

Cold Springs
- Unincorporated community
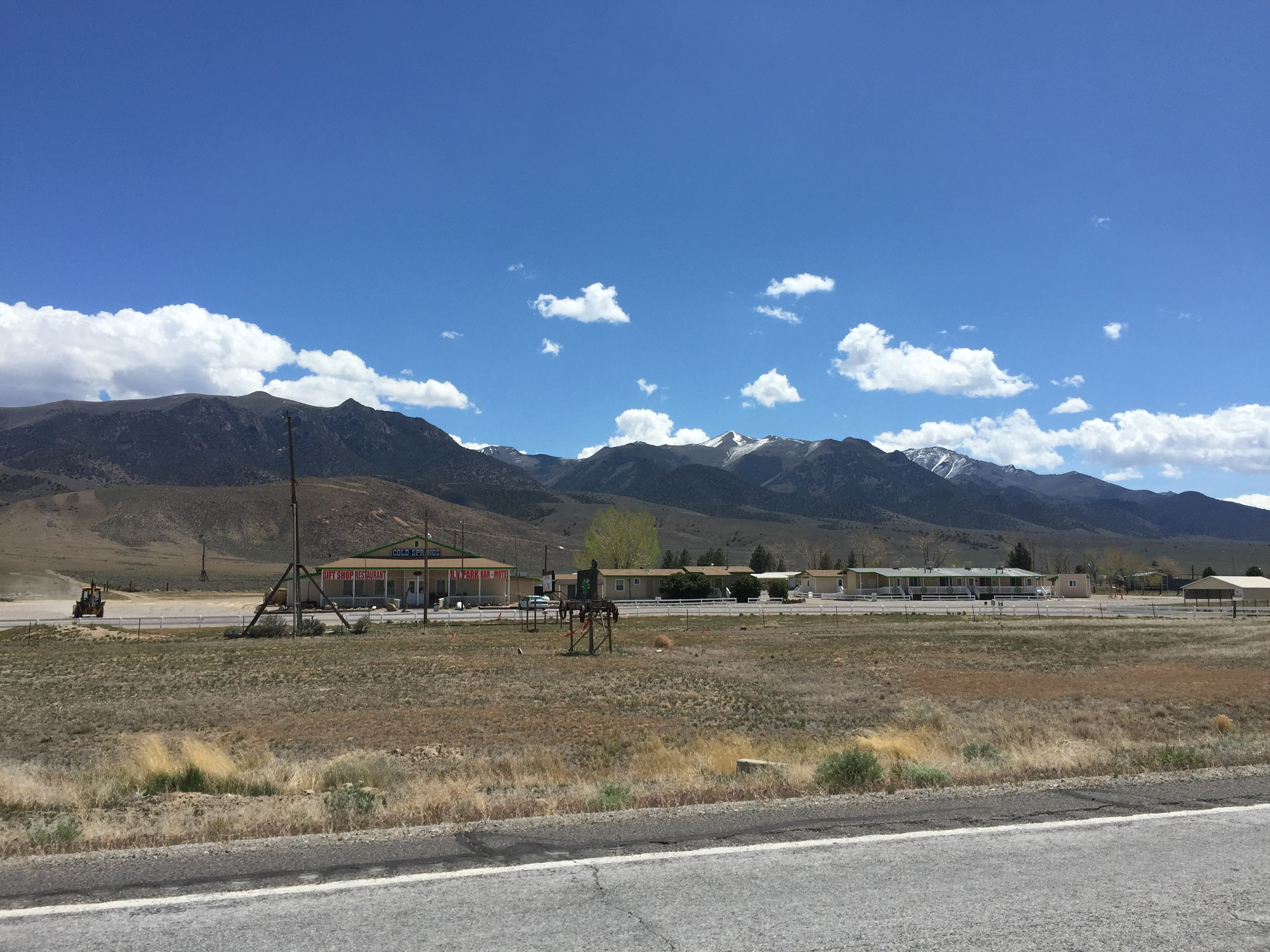
- Cold Springs, Nevada

- Location within Nevada Location within the United States
- Country: United States
- State: Nevada
- County: Churchill
- Elevation: 5,564 ft (1,696 m)
- Time zone: UTC-8 (Pacific (PST))
  - Summer (DST): UTC-7 (PDT)
- ZIP code: 89106
- Area code: 775
- GNIS feature ID: 855997

Cold Springs is an unincorporated community in Churchill County, Nevada, United States.

== History ==
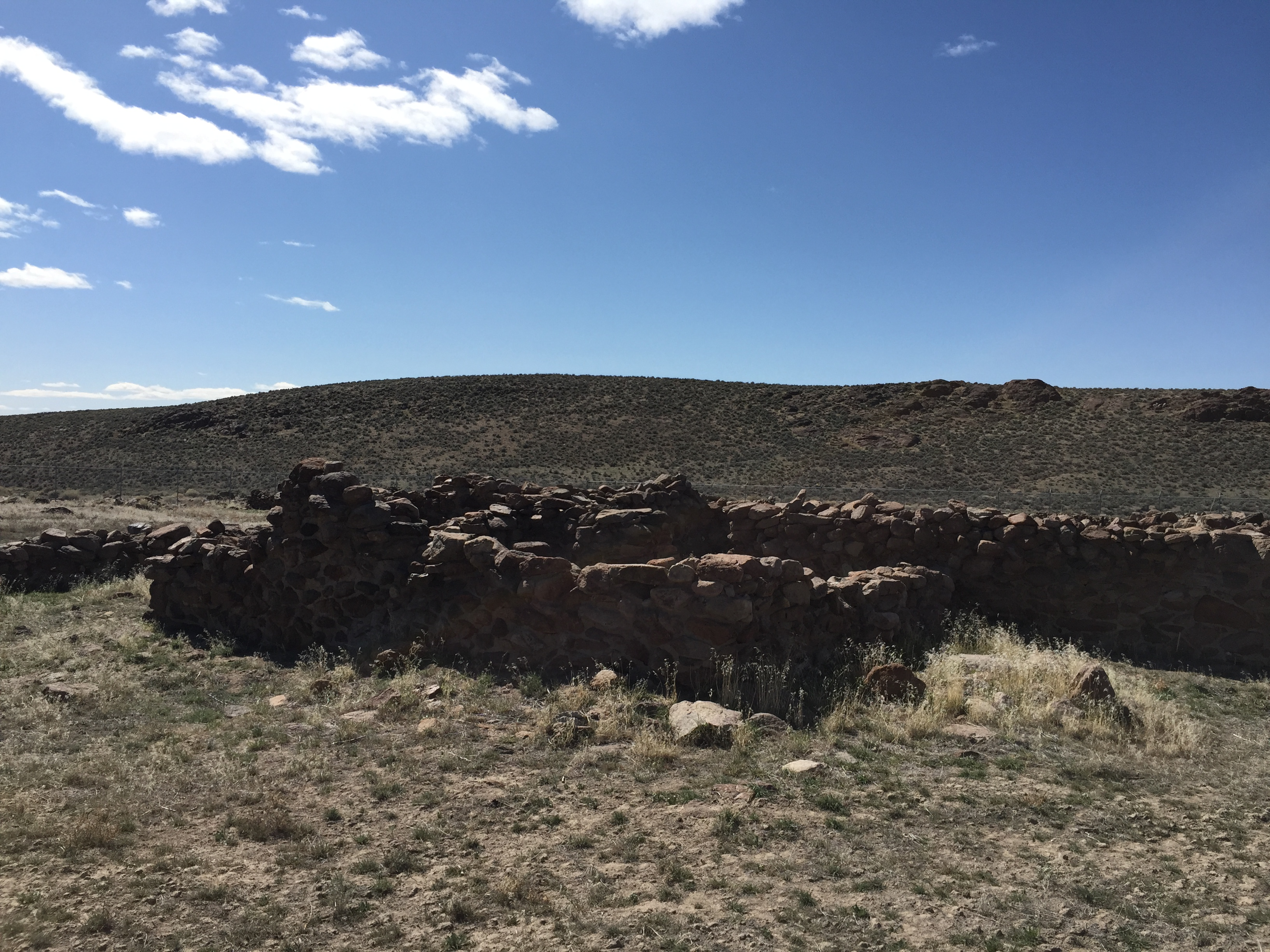
Ruins of the Cold Springs Pony Express station built in 1860

Cold Springs, less commonly known as Rock Creek, was established as a station along the Pony Express express mail route in March 1860. In 1861, a repeater which would eventually serve the first transcontinental telegraph was built about 1.5 mi (2.4 km) northwest of the Pony Express station. Later that year in July, a new station serving the Overland Trail commercial and passenger stage line opened just south of the telegraph station, replacing the original Cold Springs station which had been pillaged by Native Americans in May 1860 amidst the Paiute War.

The Pony Express ceased operations on October 26, 1861, and—with the completion of the first transcontinental railroad in 1869—the Overland Trail ceased operations. Both ruins of the Overland Trail station and original Pony Express station were listed on the National Register of Historic Places as the Cold Springs Station Site on February 23, 1972 and the Cold Springs Pony Express Station Ruins on May 16, 1978 respectively.

Currently, the area just northeast of the stagecoach stations is the site of the Cold Springs Station Resort with a restaurant, bar, gift shop, and lodging accommodations, including a six-room motel, three cabins, and an RV park. The rest of the community of Cold Springs consists of residences and a Nevada Department of Transportation maintenance depot.

== Geography ==
Cold Springs is located in eastern Churchill County along U.S. Route 50 between the Clan Alpine and Desatoya Mountains. The community is in the ZIP code 89106, addressed to Fallon; the city lies approximately 60 mi (97 km) west via U.S. 50. The nearest city is Austin, approximately 50 mi (80 km) east.
