= James Robinson (New York politician) =

American politician from New York

Member of the New York State Assembly from Queens County's 1st District
- In office 1893–1894
- Preceded by: Solomon S. Townsend
- Succeeded by: John P. Madden

James Robinson was an American politician from Queens, New York. He served as a member of the New York State Assembly from 1893 to 1894, representing Queens County's 1st District.

== Political career ==
Robinson was elected to the New York State Assembly and served in the 1893 and 1894 sessions, representing Queens County's 1st District. He resided in Long Island City, Queens.

He succeeded Solomon S. Townsend in the Assembly and was succeeded by John P. Madden.

New York State Assembly
Preceded by Solomon S. Townsend	New York State Assembly; Queens County, 1st District; 1893–1894	Succeeded by John P. Madden
