= Nicholas Nehrbauer Jr. =

American politician from New York

Member of the New York State Assembly from Queens County's 1st District
- In office 1914–1916
- Preceded by: Samuel J. Burden
- Succeeded by: Peter A. Leininger

Personal details
- Party: Democratic
- Occupation: Real estate developer

Nicholas Nehrbauer Jr. was an American politician and real estate developer from Queens, New York. He served as a member of the New York State Assembly from 1914 to 1916, representing Queens County's 1st District.

== Political career ==
Nehrbauer was elected to the New York State Assembly and took his seat in the 1914 session. The 1914 edition of Empire State Notables lists him as "Nicholas Nehrbauer, Jr. Member of Assembly Long Island City, N. Y." He served through the 1916 session.

In August 1914, the Citizens' Union released its report on the records of Assemblymen from New York City, including those from Queens, during the recent legislative session.

Nehrbauer was succeeded in the Assembly by Peter A. Leininger, who took office in 1917.

== Later life ==
After leaving the Assembly, Nehrbauer continued to be active in the real estate business. In February 1930, he sold a one-family house at the corner of Dunster and Melbourne Roads in Russell Gardens, Great Neck, New York.

His date of death and burial location are unknown.

New York State Assembly
Preceded by	New York State Assembly; Queens County, 1st District; 1914–1916	Succeeded by Peter A. Leininger
