= Andrew Zorn =

American politician from New York (1875–1943)

Member of the New York State Assembly from Queens County's 1st District
- In office 1910–1912
- Preceded by: Thomas H. Todd
- Succeeded by: Samuel J. Burden

Personal details
- Born: August 1875 Germany
- Died: March 9, 1943 (aged 67) Jackson Heights, Queens, New York, U.S.
- Party: Democratic
- Children: 4
- Occupation: Butcher, cement company representative

Andrew Zorn (August 1875 – March 9, 1943) was an American politician and businessman from Queens, New York. He served as a member of the New York State Assembly from 1910 to 1912, representing Queens County's 1st District.

== Early life ==
Zorn was born in Germany in August 1875 and was brought to the United States as a child. His family settled in the Dutch Kills section of Long Island City, Queens.

He started his career as a butcher and for a time owned a shop in the Dutch Kills section.

He married Ella Morgenheim Wangenheim on 16 December 1896.

== Political career ==
Zorn, a Democrat, first ran for the Assembly in 1907. Political meetings in those days were often held in halls connected to saloons. Zorn had a distinctive campaign style: after being introduced, he would announce, "I am the candidate for Assemblyman. You have listened to many speeches and you must be dry. The drinks are on me," and then lead his listeners to the bar.

He was elected to the New York State Assembly and served from 1910 through 1912, representing Queens County's 1st District. The Political Graveyard lists his service as 1910–1912.

== Later life and death ==
After leaving the Assembly, Zorn worked as the Queens representative for the Atlas Cement Company.

Zorn died at his home in Jackson Heights, Queens, on March 9, 1943, at the age of 68.

New York State Assembly
| Preceded by | New York State Assembly; Queens County, 1st District; 1908–1912 | Succeeded by |
