= Seward Smith =

American judge

Member of the Supreme Court of Dakota Territory
- In office 1884–1885
- Appointed by: Chester A. Arthur

Personal details
- Born: August 1, 1830 Granville, Massachusetts, US
- Died: December 10, 1887 (aged 57)
- Political party: Republican

Seward Smith (born Granville, Massachusetts, August 1, 1830, died probably Iowa, December 10, 1887) was an Iowa Republican politician, lawyer, and associate justice of the Dakota Territory Supreme Court.

He moved to Des Moines, Iowa, in 1860 and in 1868 Seward was elected city solicitor of Des Moines as a Republican. By February 1879 Smith was still practicing law with his partner (Ripley N. Baylies) in Mitchellville, Iowa. On August 10, 1881 the Republican Party of Des Moines nominated Smith as candidate for the State Senate.

In July 1884 President Chester A. Arthur appointed Smith to the Supreme Court of Dakota Territory on the recommendation of the Aberdeen, South Dakota circuit judge. However Smith quickly became controversial, appointing a woman (Elizabeth M. Cochrane) clerk of Faulk County district court, an unusual appointment for the time. Smith went on to announce his candidacy for the senate while still serving as a sitting territorial supreme court justice. Critics began openly questioning his sanity while even his proponents admitted to his poor health. In October 1885 President Grover Cleveland removed Smith from office and appointed Louis K. Church of New York to replace him. Smith's friends admitted him to an Iowa sanitarium where he subsequently died. He is interred in Woodland Cemetery in Des Moines, Iowa.
