= Luke A. Keenan =

American politician (1872–1924)

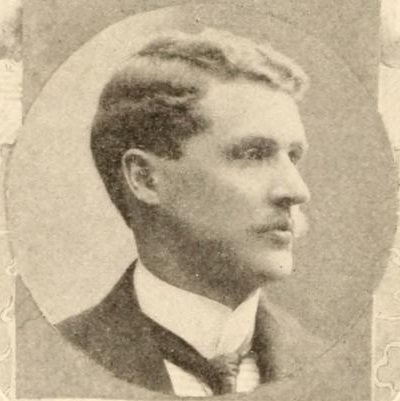
- Keenan in 1902

Member of the New York Senate from the 2nd district
- In office 1903–1906
- Preceded by: William W. Cocks
- Succeeded by: Dennis J. Harte

Member of the New York State Assembly from the Queens County, 1st district
- In office 1901–1902
- Preceded by: Charles C. Wissel
- Succeeded by: Joseph Sullivan

Personal details
- Born: April 10, 1872 New York City, U.S.
- Died: December 15, 1924 (aged 52)
- Party: Democratic
- Education: Cooper Union
- Occupation: Plasterer, trade unionist, politician

Luke A. Keenan (April 10, 1872 – December 15, 1924) was an American politician and trade unionist from New York. He served in the New York State Assembly from 1901 to 1902 and in the New York State Senate from 1903 to 1906.

== Early life and career ==
Keenan was born on April 10, 1872, in New York City. He attended public schools until 1886, when he began studying architecture at the Cooper Union for three years.

After completing his studies, Keenan worked as a plasterer. He became active in the trade union movement and served as the plasterers' representative in the building trades section of the Central Labor Union of New York.

In 1891, Keenan moved to Astoria, Queens.

== Political career ==
A Democrat, Keenan was elected to the New York State Assembly in 1900, representing Queens County's 1st District. He served in the 124th (1901) and 125th (1902) sessions.

In 1902, Keenan was elected to the New York State Senate from the 2nd District. He served from 1903 to 1906, sitting in the 126th, 127th, 128th, and 129th New York State Legislatures.

== Death ==
Keenan died in December 1924.

New York State Assembly
Preceded by Charles C. Wissel	New York State Assembly; Queens County, 1st District; 1901–1902	Succeeded by Joseph Sullivan
New York State Senate
Preceded by William W. Cocks	New York State Senate; 2nd District; 1903–1906	Succeeded by Dennis J. Harte
