= Louis K. Church =

American politician (1846–1897)

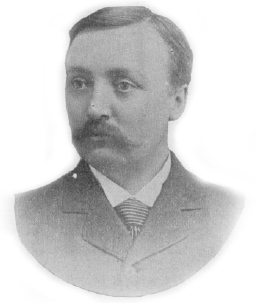

9th Governor of the Dakota Territory
- In office February 21, 1887 – March 9, 1889
- Preceded by: Gilbert A. Pierce
- Succeeded by: Arthur C. Mellette

Member of the New York State Assembly from the Queens County's 1st district
- In office 1883–1885
- Preceded by: Townsend D. Cock
- Succeeded by: John Cashow

Personal details
- Born: Louis Kossuth Church; December 11, 1846 Brooklyn, New York, U.S. (now New York City)
- Died: November 23, 1897 (aged 50) Juneau, Alaska Territory, U.S.
- Party: Democratic

Louis Kossuth Church (December 11, 1846 – November 23, 1897) was an American politician who was a New York Supreme Court justice, a member of the New York Legislature, and the ninth and penultimate Governor of Dakota Territory, serving from 1887 to 1889.

== Biography ==
Louis K. Church was born in Brooklyn, New York on December 11, 1846. He was educated at the Hudson River Institute at Claverack, New York. After studying law at the office of Judge N. B. Moore, Church was admitted to the bar. He practiced law with Judge Moore until eventually practicing by himself in 1874. Church was a member of the New York State Assembly (Queens Co., 1st D.) in 1883, 1884 and 1885. In 1885, President Cleveland appointed Church as a justice of the Dakota Territorial Supreme Court for its Third District, replacing Seward Smith, whose mental health had come into question.

Because of Church's good reputation as a judge, President Cleveland appointed Louis Church as Governor of Dakota Territory. A number of Democrats in Dakota Territory were disappointed in the appointment because they had expected the appointment of Dakota resident Frank M. Ziebach. Church became governor on February 21, 1887. He scrutinized every bill and restrained excessive spending with his veto power. He allowed the reform school to be established at Plankinton. Church opposed the division of Dakota Territory into two separate states. Governor Church and former Governors, Nehemiah G. Ordway and John L. Pennington, wanted Dakota to enter the Union as a single state.

In spite of his integrity, Church became very unpopular as governor because of his opposition to separate statehood. When Benjamin Harrison defeated Cleveland as president, Church became a lame duck who was generally ignored by the territorial legislature. On March 4, 1889, Harrison was inaugurated as president, and Church resigned as governor on March 9, 1889.

After leaving office, Louis Church returned to practicing law, first in Huron and then in Everett, Washington. He died after developing pneumonia during a trip to Juneau, Alaska on November 23, 1897.

Political offices
Preceded by Gilbert A. Pierce	Governor of the Dakota Territory; 1887–1889	Succeeded by Arthur C. Mellette
