= Thomas H. Todd =

American politician from New York

Member of the New York State Assembly from Queens County's 1st District
- In office 1907–1909
- Preceded by: Dennis J. Harte
- Succeeded by: Andrew Zorn

Thomas H. Todd was an American politician from Queens, New York. He served as a member of the New York State Assembly from 1907 to 1909, representing Queens County's 1st District.

== Political career ==
Todd was elected to the New York State Assembly and served from 1907 to 1909, representing Queens County's 1st District. He succeeded Dennis J. Harte, who had served in the Assembly in 1906 before being elected to the New York State Senate. Todd was succeeded by Andrew Zorn, who served from 1910 to 1912.

His date of death and burial location are unknown.

New York State Assembly
Preceded by Dennis J. Harte	New York State Assembly; Queens County, 1st District; 1907–1909	Succeeded by Andrew Zorn
