= John P. Madden =

American politician from New York

Member of the New York State Assembly from Queens County's 1st District
- In office 1895–1895
- Preceded by: James Robinson
- Succeeded by: Jacob Stahl

Personal details
- Party: Democratic
- Other political affiliations: Jeffersonian Democratic

John P. Madden was an American politician from Queens, New York. He served as a member of the New York State Assembly in 1895, representing Queens County's 1st District, and was the Jeffersonian Democratic candidate for Mayor of Long Island City in the same year.

== Political career ==
Madden, a Democrat, was elected to the New York State Assembly in 1894 and served in the 1895 session, representing Queens County's 1st District. He succeeded James Robinson in that seat and was succeeded by Jacob Stahl.

=== 1895 Long Island City mayoral election ===
In 1895, Madden ran for Mayor of Long Island City as the candidate of the Jeffersonian Democracy, a faction of the Democratic Party. The election was highly contentious, with competing returns filed by different officials. According to returns filed with the City Clerk, Madden had been elected by a plurality of 21 votes, while returns filed with the County Clerk and Supervisor showed former Mayor P.J. Gleason as the winner.

The dispute over the election results led to legal challenges. Madden sought an injunction to prevent the county clerk from printing the names of certain Democratic nominees on the official ballot, a case that ultimately reached the New York Court of Appeals. The Court of Appeals ruled in Madden's favor in January 1896, though the decision did not affect the outcome of the mayoral election.

Despite the legal victory, Madden was ultimately unsuccessful in securing the mayoralty. The election dispute also led to the arrest of City Clerk Thomas J. Murphy, who had issued a certificate of election to Madden, on charges of election fraud.

=== Later political activities ===
In 1896, Madden was a Democratic candidate for Presidential Elector for New York. In 1900, he was a delegate to the Democratic National Convention in Kansas City, Missouri, which nominated William Jennings Bryan for President.

New York State Assembly
Preceded by James Robinson	New York State Assembly; Queens County, 1st District; 1895	Succeeded by Jacob Stahl
