= Dennis J. Harte =

American politician (1866–1917)

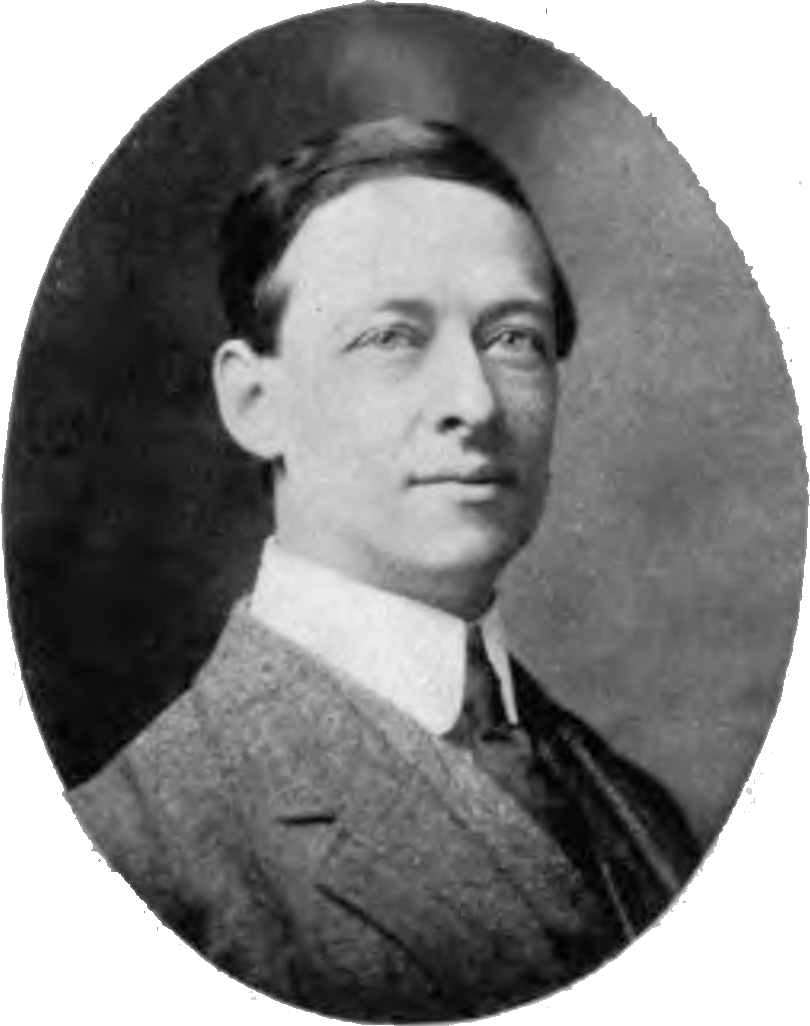

Member of the New York Senate from the 2nd district
- In office 1907–1912
- Preceded by: Luke A. Keenan
- Succeeded by: Bernard M. Patten

Member of the New York State Assembly from the Queens County, 1st district
- In office 1906–1906
- Preceded by: Joseph Sullivan
- Succeeded by: Thomas H. Todd

Personal details
- Born: Dennis John Harte; August 5, 1866 Manhattan, New York City, U.S.
- Died: February 19, 1917 (aged 50) Long Island City, Queens, New York City, U.S.
- Party: Democratic
- Spouse: Teresa Bartley
- Children: 2
- Occupation: Politician, businessman

Dennis John Harte (August 5, 1866 – February 19, 1917) was an American politician from New York. He served in the New York State Assembly in 1906 and in the New York State Senate from 1907 to 1912.

== Early life and career ==
Harte was born on August 5, 1866, in Manhattan, New York City. He worked for a wholesale importing company.

== Political career ==
A Democrat, Harte was elected to the New York State Assembly in 1905, representing Queens County's 1st District in the 1906 session.

In 1906, Harte was elected to the New York State Senate from the 2nd District. He served from 1907 to 1912, sitting in the 130th, 131st, 132nd, 133rd, 134th, and 135th New York State Legislatures.

== Personal life and death ==
Harte married Teresa Bartley. They had two children: a son, Earle P. Harte (1895–1954), and a daughter, Nan Harte (1909–2007).

Harte died on February 19, 1917, at his home at 350 Stevens Street in Long Island City, Queens.

New York State Assembly
Preceded by Joseph Sullivan	New York State Assembly; Queens County, 1st District; 1906	Succeeded by Thomas H. Todd
New York State Senate
Preceded by Luke A. Keenan	New York State Senate; 2nd District; 1907–1912	Succeeded by Bernard M. Patten
