= Cold Spring Farm =

Cold Spring Farm may refer to:

- Cold Spring Farm (Phippsburg, Maine), listed on the NRHP in Sagadahoc County, Maine
- Cold Spring Farm (Todd, Pennsylvania), listed on the NRHP in Pennsylvania
- Cold Spring Farm Springhouse, Monroe, PA, listed on the NRHP in Monroe County, Pennsylvania

== See also ==
- Cold Spring (disambiguation)
