= Charles C. Wissel =

American politician from New York

Member of the New York State Assembly from Queens County's 1st District
- In office 1899–1900
- Preceded by: George L. Glaser
- Succeeded by: Luke A. Keenan

Charles C. Wissel was an American politician from Queens, New York. He served as a member of the New York State Assembly from 1899 to 1900, representing Queens County's 1st District.

== Political career ==
Wissel was elected to the New York State Assembly and served in the 1899 and 1900 sessions, representing Queens County's 1st District. He resided in Evergreen, Queens County.

He was succeeded in the Assembly by Luke A. Keenan, who took office in 1901.

His burial location is unknown.

New York State Assembly
Preceded by	New York State Assembly; Queens County, 1st District; 1899–1900	Succeeded by Luke A. Keenan
