= Jacob Stahl =

American politician from New York

Member of the New York State Assembly from Queens County's 1st District
- In office 1896–1896
- Preceded by: John P. Madden
- Succeeded by: Thomas F. Kennedy

Personal details
- Born: c. 1840
- Died: November 8, 1898 (aged 57–58) Queens, New York City, U.S.
- Party: Democratic

Jacob Stahl (c. 1840 – November 8, 1898) was an American politician from Queens, New York. He served as a member of the New York State Assembly in 1896, representing Queens County's 1st District.

== Political career ==
Stahl was elected to the New York State Assembly and served in the 1896 session, representing Queens County's 1st District. He was a Democrat.

He was succeeded in the Assembly by Thomas F. Kennedy, who served in 1897.

== Death ==
Stahl died on November 8, 1898, in Queens, New York City, at approximately 58 years of age. His burial location is unknown.

New York State Assembly
Preceded by John P. Madden	New York State Assembly; Queens County, 1st District; 1896	Succeeded by Thomas F. Kennedy
