= Henry M. Dietz =

American politician from New York

Member of the New York State Assembly from Queens County's 1st District
- In office 1924–1926
- Preceded by: Peter A. Leininger
- Succeeded by: Carl Deutschmann

Personal details
- Born: April 26, 1892 Astoria, Queens, New York, U.S.
- Party: Democratic
- Occupation: Realtor

Military service
- Allegiance: United States
- Branch/service: U.S. Army
- Battles/wars: World War I

Henry M. Dietz (also spelled Henry M. Deitz in some records; April 26, 1892 – date of death unknown) was an American politician, realtor, and military veteran from Queens, New York. He served as a member of the New York State Assembly from 1924 to 1926, representing Queens County's 1st District.

== Early life and military service ==
Henry M. Dietz was born in Astoria, Queens, on April 26, 1892. He served in the United States Army during World War I.

== Political career ==
Dietz, a Democrat, was elected to the New York State Assembly in 1923 and took his seat in the 1924 session. He had previously run for office in 1915 as a member of the American Party, but was defeated.

In October 1924, the Citizens Union assessed the candidates for the Assembly and described Dietz as a man who "made a disappointingly poor record generally" in the Assembly that year.

In October 1925, the Queens County District Council of the Steuben Society of America endorsed Dietz for re-election to the Assembly, along with fellow Democratic candidates Alfred J. Kennedy and William F. Brunner.

== Later career and legal troubles ==
After leaving the Assembly, Dietz worked as a realtor. In December 1938, he was arrested on charges of grand larceny. An Astoria physician alleged that Dietz had obtained $2,200 from him under the promise that he could secure the doctor's appointment to the medical staff of the Triborough Bridge and Tunnel Authority. Dietz was arraigned in Queens Felony Court and released on $5,000 bail pending action of the grand jury. He denied the charges.

Earlier press reports indicate that Dietz had also been indicted in a separate fraud case involving $5,175.

== Affiliations ==
Dietz was a member of several fraternal and veterans' organizations, including the Elks, the American Legion, the Moose, and the Knights of Pythias.
