= George L. Glaser =

American politician from New York

Member of the New York State Assembly from Queens County's 1st District
- In office 1898–1898
- Preceded by: Thomas F. Kennedy
- Succeeded by: Charles C. Wissel

Personal details
- Party: Democratic

George L. Glaser was an American politician from Queens, New York. He served as a member of the New York State Assembly in 1898, representing Queens County's 1st District. He later served as Deputy Surrogate of Queens County and was a leader of the Queens County Democratic Party.

== Political career ==
Glaser was elected to the New York State Assembly in 1897 and served in the 1898 session, representing Queens County's 1st District. He resided in Newtown, Queens County.

After his service in the Assembly, Glaser served as Deputy Surrogate of Queens County. In May 1899, he was arraigned in Queens County Court on charges of collecting an alleged fraudulent bill for $1,500 from the town of Newtown. Ex-Supervisor Joseph Bermel of Newtown was also indicted for auditing the bill and for misappropriating $200.

Glaser was a leader of the Queens County Democratic Party. In March 1918, he was declared incompetent by a jury and was committed to Rivercrest Sanitarium. William H. Robinson, an attorney of Elmhurst, was appointed as his committee (legal guardian). At the time, Glaser was reported to be worth more than $100,000 and believed himself to be "immensely rich" and to have a government job paying $20,000,000 a year.

His burial location is unknown.

New York State Assembly
Preceded by	New York State Assembly; Queens County, 1st District; 1898	Succeeded by Charles C. Wissel
