= Thomas F. Kennedy =

American politician from New York

Member of the New York State Assembly from Queens County's 1st District
- In office 1897–1897
- Preceded by: Jacob Stahl
- Succeeded by: George L. Glaser

Thomas F. Kennedy was an American politician from Queens, New York. He served as a member of the New York State Assembly in 1897, representing Queens County's 1st District.

== Political career ==
Kennedy was elected to the New York State Assembly and served in the 1897 session, representing Queens County's 1st District. He resided in Queens County.

He was succeeded in the Assembly by George L. Glaser, who served in 1898.

His burial location is unknown.

New York State Assembly
Preceded by	New York State Assembly; Queens County, 1st District; 1897	Succeeded by George L. Glaser
