= Joseph Sullivan (New York politician) =

American politician from New York

Member of the New York State Assembly from Queens County's 1st District
- In office 1905–1906
- Preceded by: Luke A. Keenan
- Succeeded by: Dennis J. Harte

Joseph Sullivan was an American politician from Queens, New York. He served as a member of the New York State Assembly from 1905 to 1906, representing Queens County's 1st District.

== Political career ==
Sullivan was elected to the New York State Assembly and served in the 1905 and 1906 sessions.

During the 1905 session, Sullivan introduced several notable bills. One bill aimed to regulate the price of gas in the Borough of Queens, proposing that the price should not exceed that charged in any other borough of New York City. Another bill he introduced sought to prevent the Long Island Railroad from raising its tariffs, limiting fares and baggage rates to those in effect on January 1, 1905.

Sullivan served in the Assembly until 1906. He was succeeded by Dennis J. Harte, who took office in 1907 after being elected to the State Senate.

New York State Assembly
Preceded by	New York State Assembly; Queens County, 1st District; 1905–1906	Succeeded by Dennis J. Harte
