= Laurel Hollow, New York =

Laurel Hollow, New York Lauralton, New York
- Village
- Incorporated Village of Laurel Hollow
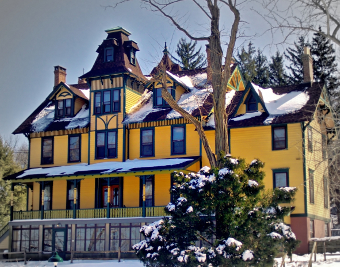
- The Charles Davenport Residence in Laurel Hollow, part of the Cold Spring Harbor Laboratory

- Location in Nassau County and the state of New York

- Location on Long Island Location within the state of New York.
- Coordinates: 40°51′25″N 73°28′37″W
- Country: United States
- State: New York
- County: Nassau
- Town: Oyster Bay
- Incorporated: 1926

Government
  - Mayor: Dan DeVita

Area
  - Total: 3.16 sq mi (8.19 km^{2})
  - Land: 2.96 sq mi (7.66 km^{2})
  - Water: 0.20 sq mi (0.53 km^{2})
- Elevation: 240 ft (73 m)

Population (2020)
  - Total: 1,940
  - Density: 655.9/sq mi (253.25/km^{2})
- Time zone: UTC-5 (Eastern (EST))
  - Summer (DST): UTC-4 (EDT)
- ZIP Codes: 11771 (Oyster Bay); 11791 (Syosset)
- Area codes: 516, 363
- FIPS code: 36-41487
- GNIS feature ID: 0955090
- Website: www.laurelhollowny.gov

Laurel Hollow is a village located within the Town of Oyster Bay in Nassau County, on the North Shore of Long Island, in New York, United States. The population was 1,940 at the time of the 2020 census.

According to Bloomberg BusinessWeek, Laurel Hollow was the eighth wealthiest town in America in 2009.

== History ==
The settlement of what would later become Laurel Hollow began c. 1653, when European colonists purchased land from the local Matinecock Native Americans.

The village was incorporated in 1926 as "Lauralton," but the name was changed to "Laurel Hollow" in 1935, in order to avoid postal confusion with the Laurelton neighborhood of adjacent Queens. Today, Laurel Hollow is served by post offices in the hamlets of Syosset, Oyster Bay, Woodbury and Cold Spring Harbor.

The globally renowned Cold Spring Harbor Laboratory is located in the village.

== Geography ==
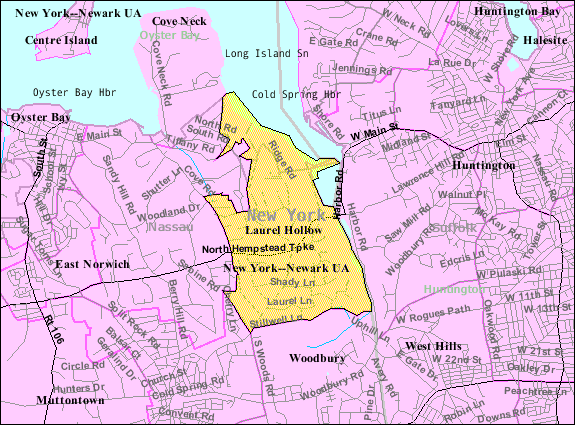
U.S. Census map of Laurel Hollow.

According to the United States Census Bureau, the village has a total area of 3.1 square miles (8.0 km^{2}), of which 2.9 square miles (7.5 km^{2}) is land and 0.2 square miles (0.52 km^{2}), or 5.18%, is water.

The village is situated in Nassau County and creates a portion of Nassau's eastern border with Suffolk County. Hilly terrain predominates in the area, and the forests are mostly deciduous trees with a low canopy of laurel bushes that provide a low evergreen canopy. New York State Route 25A passes through Laurel Hollow east–west.

The postal service is covered by Oyster Bay Post Office to the north, and the Syosset Post Office to the south.

== Demographics ==
Historical population
Census	Pop.	Note	%±
1930	161		—
1940	110		−31.7%
1950	169		53.6%
1960	834		393.5%
1970	1,401		68.0%
1980	1,527		9.0%
1990	1,748		14.5%
2000	1,930		10.4%
2010	1,952		1.1%
2020	1,940		−0.6%
U.S. Decennial Census

=== Racial and ethnic composition ===
Laurel Hollow village, New York – Racial and ethnic composition Note: the US Census treats Hispanic/Latino as an ethnic category. This table excludes Latinos from the racial categories and assigns them to a separate category. Hispanics/Latinos may be of any race.
Race / Ethnicity (NH = Non-Hispanic)	Pop 2000	Pop 2010	Pop 2020	% 2000	% 2010	% 2020
White alone (NH)	1,732	1,708	1,603	89.74%	87.50%	82.63%
Black or African American alone (NH)	17	29	15	0.88%	1.49%	0.77%
Native American or Alaska Native alone (NH)	0	3	0	0.00%	0.15%	0.00%
Asian alone (NH)	132	149	168	6.84%	7.63%	8.66%
Native Hawaiian or Pacific Islander alone (NH)	0	0	0	0.00%	0.00%	0.00%
Other race alone (NH)	0	0	7	0.00%	0.00%	0.36%
Mixed race or Multiracial (NH)	11	18	55	0.57%	0.92%	2.84%
Hispanic or Latino (any race)	38	45	92	1.97%	2.31%	4.74%
Total	1,930	1,952	1,940	100.00%	100.00%	100.00%

=== 2000 census ===
As of the census of 2000, there were 1,930 people, 598 households, and 528 families residing in the village. The population density was 660.0 inhabitants per square mile (254.8/km^{2}). There were 621 housing units at an average density of 212.4 per square mile (82.0/km^{2}). The racial makeup of the village was 91.30% White, 0.88% African American, 6.84% Asian, 0.21% from other races, and 0.78% from two or more races. Hispanic or Latino of any race were 1.97% of the population.

There were 598 households, out of which 44.8% had children under the age of 18 living with them, 81.8% were married couples living together, 5.4% had a female householder with no husband present, and 11.7% were non-families. 10.4% of all households were made up of individuals, and 4.5% had someone living alone who was 65 years of age or older. The average household size was 3.20 and the average family size was 3.37.

In the village, the population was spread out, with 30.4% under the age of 18, 4.4% from 18 to 24, 21.7% from 25 to 44, 30.0% from 45 to 64, and 13.5% who were 65 years of age or older. The median age was 41 years. For every 100 females, there were 88.8 males. For every 100 females age 18 and over, there were 87.0 males.

The median income for a household in the village was in excess of $200,000, as is the median income for a family. Males had a median income of over $100,000 versus $60,000 for females. The per capita income for the village was $83,366. About 0.7% of families and 1.9% of the population were below the poverty line, including 1.0% of those under age 18 and 7.3% of those age 65 or over.

== Education ==
Laurel Hollow is primarily served by the Cold Spring Harbor Central School District in Cold Spring Harbor (which is predominantly in Suffolk County), although a small portion of the village is served by the Oyster Bay-East Norwich Central School District.

== Public Safety ==
=== Fire Department ===
Laurel Hollow is served by the Oyster Bay Fire Department to the north, and the Syosset Fire Department to the south.

=== Police Department ===
Laurel Hollow used to have their own police force, however the department was dissolved in 1998 when residents voted in a referendum to abolish it due to rising costs and staffing challenges, merging its operations into the Nassau County Police Department. Nassau County then covered the village up until 2011. The Oyster Bay Cove Police now covers the entire village.

== Landmarks ==
- Cold Spring Harbor Laboratory, a non-profit institute that conducts biomedical research, trains scientists, and organizes scientific conferences.
- Cold Spring Harbor Fish Hatchery and Aquarium.
- Laurel Hollow Beach, on the west coast of Cold Spring Harbor's inner harbor.

== Notable people ==
- Jay Gould – Leading American railroad developer and speculator. His success at business made him the ninth richest U.S. citizen in history. Built Cedar Knolls for his grandson Frank Gould.
- Alfred Hershey – Nobel Prize–winning bacteriologist and geneticist; lived for much of his adult life at the Cold Spring Harbor Laboratory.
- Ned Lamont – Governor of Connecticut (2019–present); spent some of his childhood years residing in Laurel Hollow.
- John Lennon – Member of The Beatles, owned Cannon Hill, an estate with wife Yoko Ono in Laurel Hollow at the time of his death.
- Lindsay Lohan – Actress and TV personality, spent her early childhood years in Laurel Hollow.
- Doug Morris – Chairman of 12Tone Music Group. He previously was chairman and CEO of the Universal Music Group from 1995 to 2011, and chairman and CEO of Sony Music Entertainment from 2011 to 2017. Founder (and former chairman) of VEVO.
- Louis Comfort Tiffany – Artist and decorative designer; some of his glass vases, lamps, and windows depict scenes inspired by the view from Laurelton Hall – his estate in Laurel Hollow – and three of whose stained glass windows are housed in St. John's Episcopal Church in Cold Spring Harbor.
- James D. Watson – One of the first scientists to understand the double-helix structure of DNA, which had been discovered by Rosalind Franklin; former chancellor of Cold Spring Harbor Laboratory.

== See also ==
- List of municipalities in New York
- Laurelton, Queens
- Oyster Bay Cove, New York
