= Cold Spring Harbor (disambiguation) =

Cold Spring Harbor can refer to:

- Cold Spring Harbor (album), Billy Joel's first solo album, released in 1971
- Cold Spring Harbor (novel), a 1986 novel by Richard Yates
- Cold Spring Harbor, New York, a hamlet on Long Island
  - Cold Spring Harbor (LIRR station), a station on the Long Island Rail Road

== See also ==
- Cold Spring Harbor Laboratory, a genetics laboratory
- Cold Spring Harbor Jr./Sr. High School
