= Peter A. Leininger =

American politician and builder (1860–1937)

Member of the New York State Assembly from Queens County's 1st District
- In office 1917–1923
- Preceded by: Nicholas Nehrbauer Jr.
- Succeeded by: Henry M. Dietz

Personal details
- Born: January 2, 1860 New York City, U.S.
- Died: August 21, 1937 (aged 77) Astoria, Queens, New York, U.S.
- Party: Democratic
- Spouse: Kate Smith
- Children: 2
- Occupation: Builder, real estate developer

Peter A. Leininger (January 2, 1860 – August 21, 1937) was an American builder, real estate developer, and politician from New York. He served seven terms in the New York State Assembly from 1917 to 1923, representing Queens County's 1st District.

== Life ==
Leininger was born on January 2, 1860, in New York City, New York, the son of Adam J. Leininger and Elizabeth Bittinger. His parents were both German immigrants from Bavaria. His father was a stone cutter, an American Civil War veteran who served with the 33rd New Jersey Infantry Regiment and the 69th New York Infantry Regiment, and an interpreter for the government in the West.

After finishing his limited schooling, Leininger spent a year working in Devoe's oil yard in Greenport. He then spent two years working with an uncle in Empire Laundry. He then became a machinist with P. J. Jennings for two and a half years. This was followed by six months as a lithographer. He then worked in the Steinway & Sons for six years, later working for piano action manufacturers Wesley, Nickel & Gross. He then formed a partnership with his brother and worked as a contractor and builder in New York City, later taking an interest in the Berman Brothers carpet store.

In 1883, Leininger moved to Long Island City and became involved in the building business. Interested in the real estate business, he bought a seven-acre tract of land and built up Hoyt Avenue, Debevoise Avenue, and Lawrence Street. He also built and sold a brick double flat in South Brooklyn and worked as an appraiser of property. In 1887, he was an organizer of the Long Island City Building and Loan Association, serving as a director until his retirement in 1916. In 1893, he became a City Assessor in Long Island City, and he was president of the Board of Assessors for three years before the consolidation with the Greater City in 1898.

== Political career ==
In the 1904 United States House of Representatives election, Leininger was the People's Party's candidate for New York's 14th congressional district. He lost the election to Charles A. Towne.

In 1916, Leininger was elected to the New York State Assembly as a Democrat, representing the Queens County 1st District. He served in the Assembly for seven consecutive terms, taking his seat in the 1917 session and serving through the 1923 session.

During his time in the Assembly, Leininger introduced legislation that provided for constructing a tunnel from Astoria through Ward's Island under the Hudson River to Manhattan.

== Personal life and death ==
Leininger was a member of the Elks and the State Volunteer Fire Department. He was a volunteer fireman of the Mohawk Hose Company and president of the Veteran Firemans' Association of Long Island City. He was married to Kate Smith of New York City. His children were Mrs. Eugene E. Heaton and Mrs. Elsie Beeker.

Leininger died on August 21, 1937, after falling from the window of his Astoria home while repairing the window frame.

New York State Assembly
Preceded by Nicholas Nehrbauer Jr.	New York State Assembly; Queens County, 1st District; 1917–1923	Succeeded by Henry M. Dietz
