= Historic Cold Spring Village =

Museum in Cold Spring, New Jersey

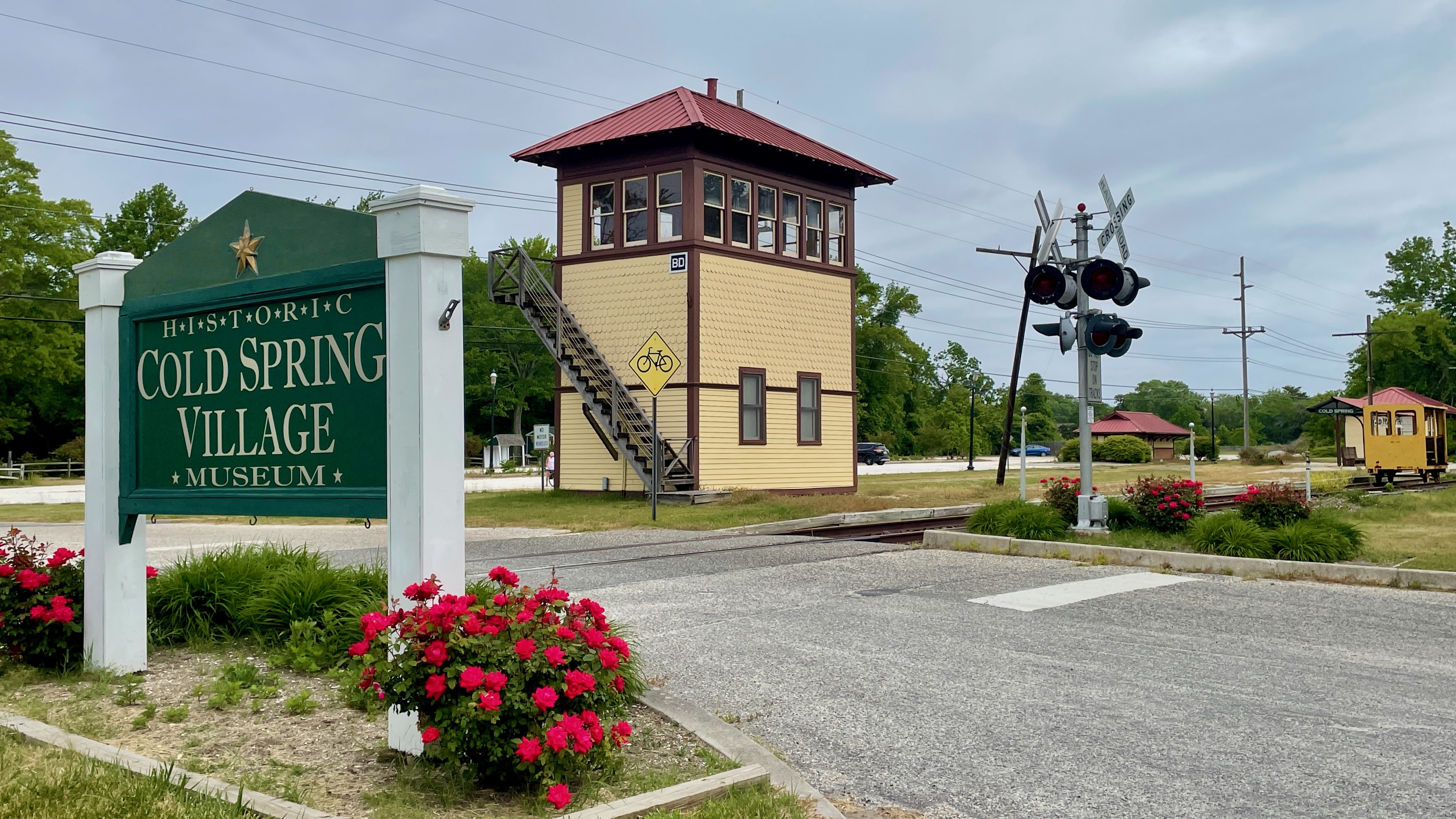
- Entrance sign on US Route 9

- Location within Cape May County, New Jersey
- Location: 720 US Route 9 Cold Spring, New Jersey
- Coordinates: 38°58′36″N 74°54′43″W

Historic Cold Spring Village is a non-profit living history museum in the Cold Spring section of Lower Township in Cape May County, New Jersey. The village was listed as the Historic Cold Spring Village Historic District on the New Jersey Register of Historic Places on September 27, 2016.

The Village consists of 27 historic buildings relocated from around Cape May County, several of which are listed on the National Register of Historic Places. There are two entrances, one at 735 Seashore Road and the other at 720 US Route 9. The Cold Spring Grange Hall, listed in 1998, located at the Seashore Road entrance, serves as the Cold Spring Grange Restaurant. Cold Spring Village is home to Cold Spring Brewery, the only non-profit craft brewery in New Jersey.

In 1983 the one-room former Cape May Point jail was moved to the village.

== Gallery ==
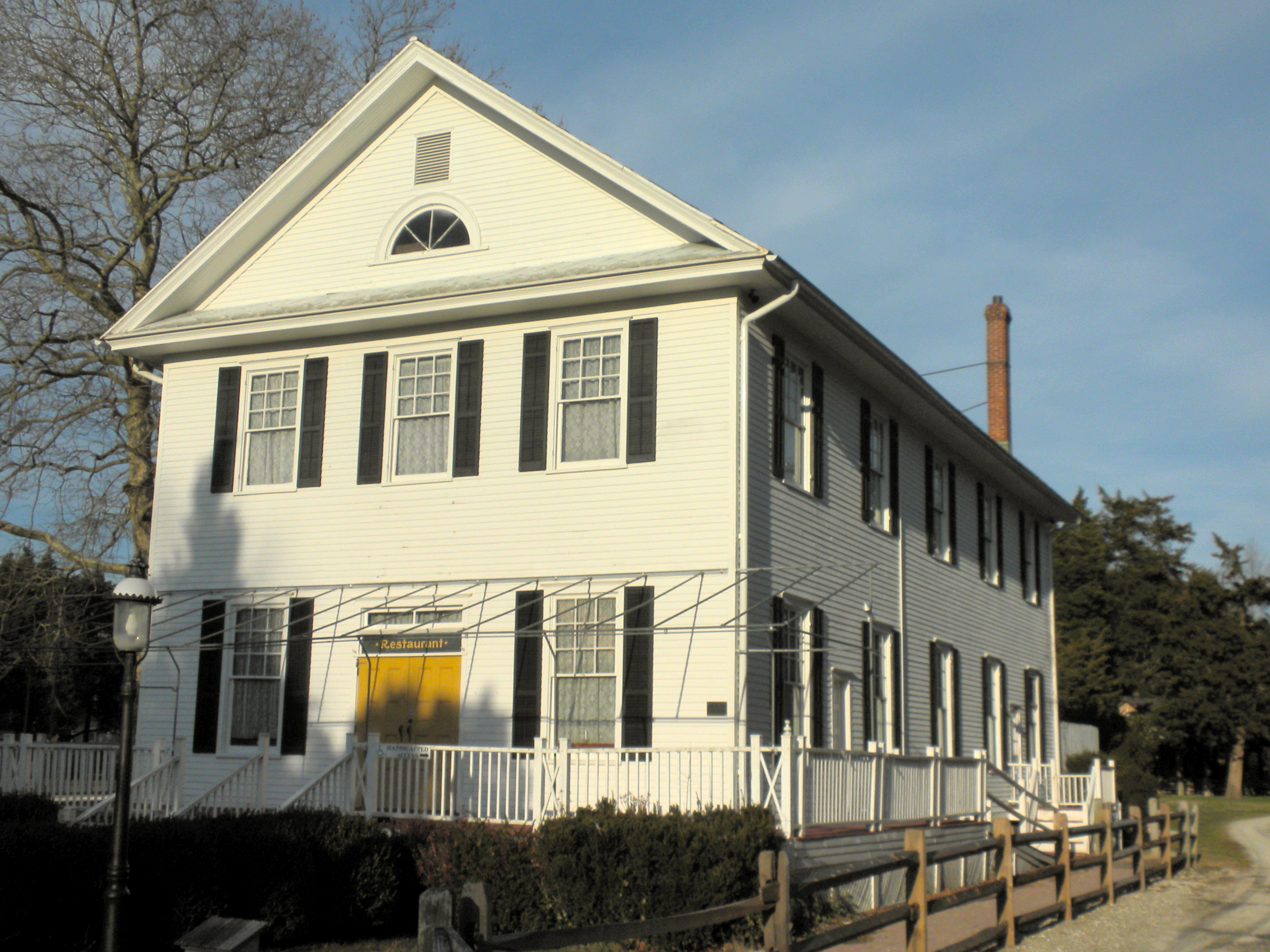
Cold Spring Grange Hall

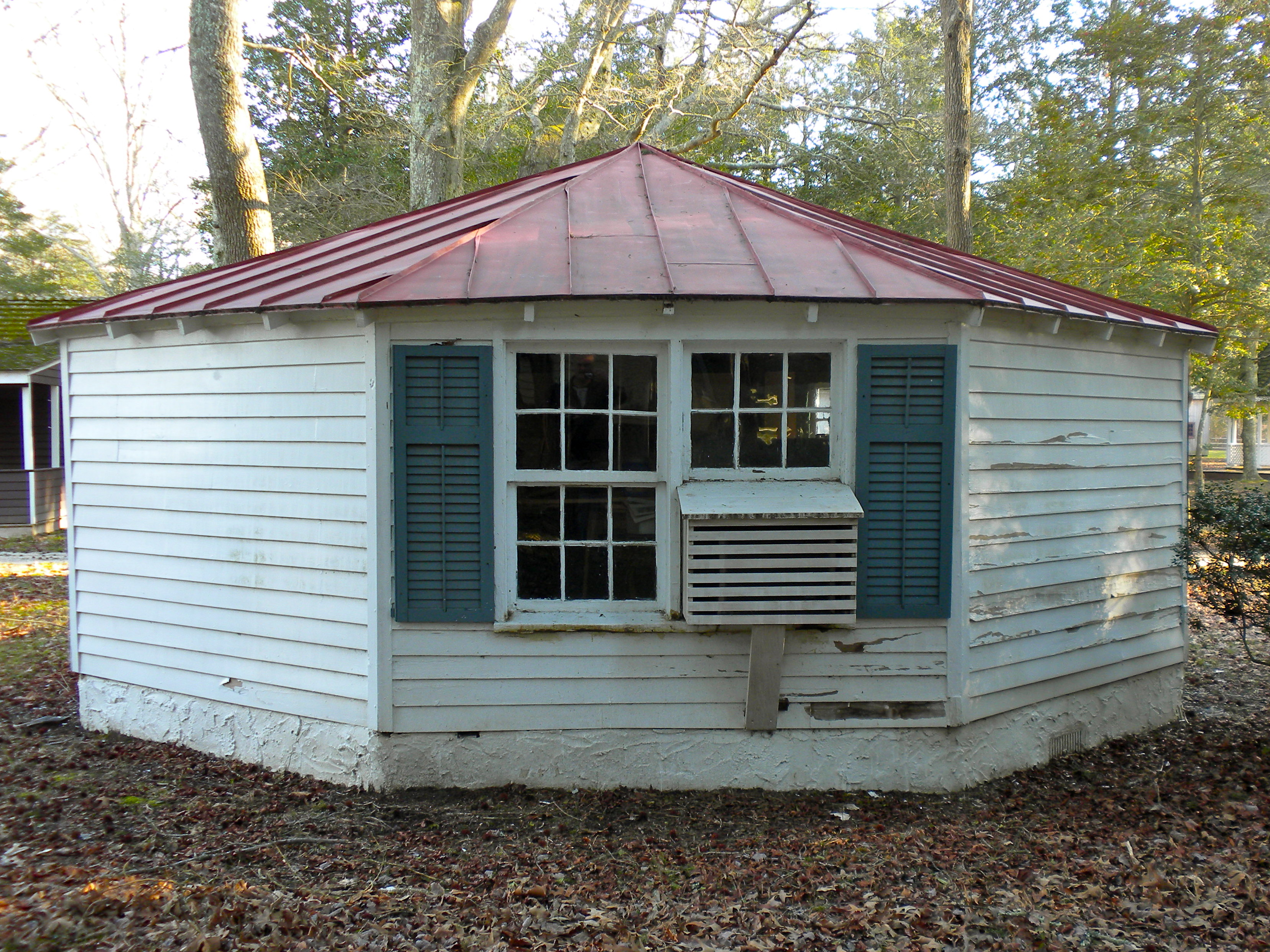
Octagonal Poultry House

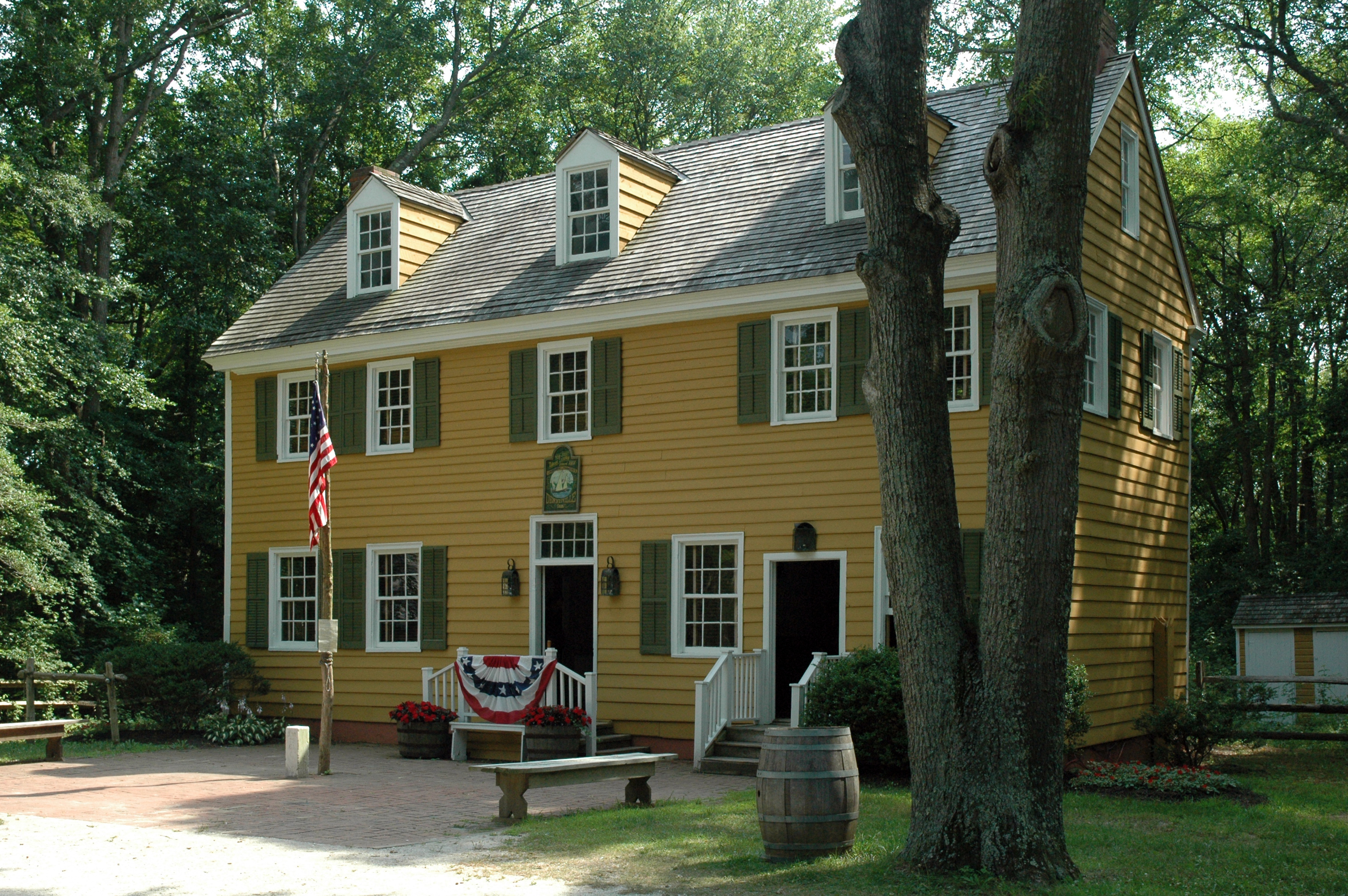
Dennisville Inn

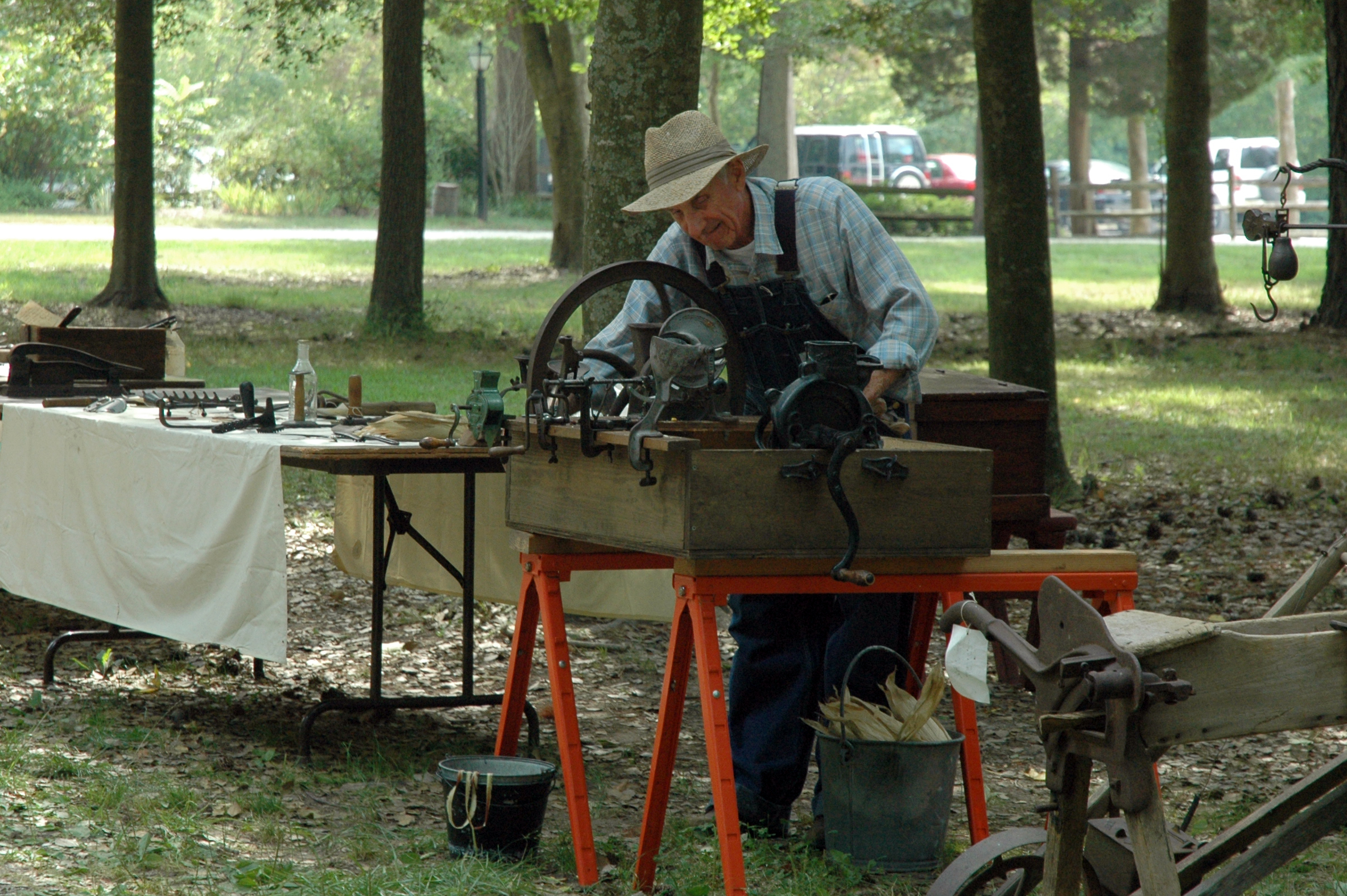
Re-enactment
