= Cold Spring Grange Hall =

- U.S. National Register of Historic Places
- New Jersey Register of Historic Places
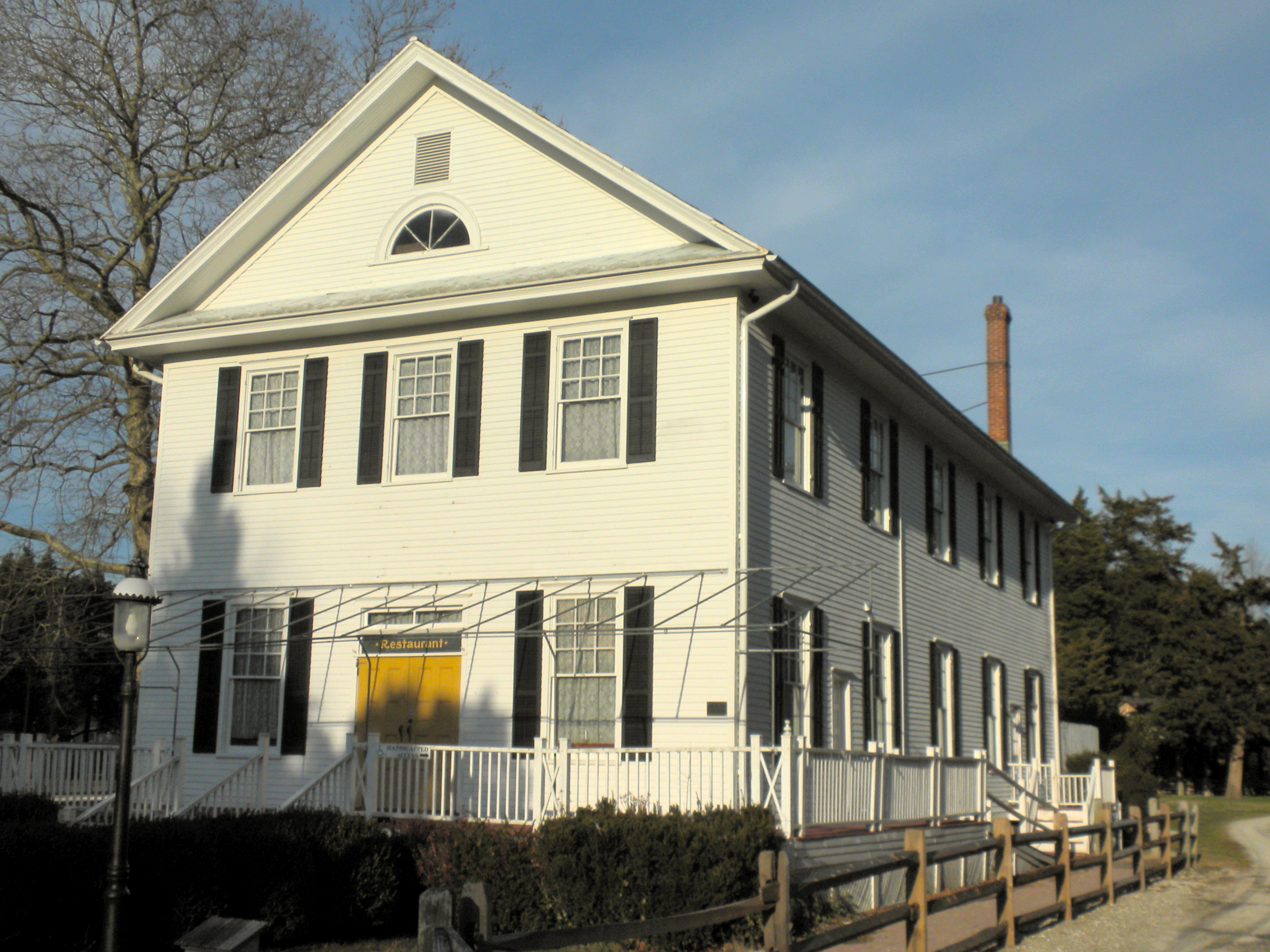

- Location within Cape May County, New Jersey Location within New Jersey Location within the United States
- Location: 720 Seashore Road, Lower Township, New Jersey
- Coordinates: 38°58′39″N 74°54′48″W
- Built: 1912
- Architect: William Hoffman
- Architectural style: Colonial Revival
- NRHP reference No.: 98000234
- NJRHP No.: 89

Significant dates
- Added to NRHP: March 30, 1998
- Designated NJRHP: January 15, 1998

The Cold Spring Grange Hall is located at 720 Seashore Road (U.S. Route 9) in the Cold Spring section of Lower Township in Cape May County, New Jersey, United States. The historic grange hall was built in 1912, designed as the meeting hall for the Cold Spring Grange #132. It was added to the National Register of Historic Places on March 30, 1998, for its significance in architecture and social history. It is at the entrance of Historic Cold Spring Village and is run as a restaurant.

== See also ==
- National Register of Historic Places listings in Cape May County, New Jersey
