= John Cashow =

American politician (1817–1899)

Member of the New York State Assembly from Queens County's 1st District
- In office 1888–1888
- Preceded by: Joseph Fitch
- Succeeded by: Solomon S. Townsend

Personal details
- Born: December 30, 1817 Brookville, New York, U.S.
- Died: September 19, 1899 (aged 81) Mill Neck, New York, U.S.
- Party: Republican (before 1872); Liberal Republican (after 1872)
- Spouse: Hester Craig
- Occupation: Politician, harbor master, insurance executive

John Cashow (December 30, 1817 – September 19, 1899) was an American politician from Queens, New York. He served as a member of the New York State Assembly in 1888, representing Queens County's 1st District. He also served as an alderman, harbor master of the Port of New York, and supervisor of the town of Oyster Bay.

== Early life ==
Cashow was born on December 30, 1817, in Brookville, Long Island, the son of John Kirk Cashow and Elizabeth Underhill. He attended the district school until nearly reaching adulthood.

== Career ==
In 1835, Cashow moved to Brooklyn, where he became involved in politics. He served as an alderman for five years and was chairman of the committee that recommended the resolution providing for the removal of the remains of the martyrs of the British prison‑ships to their final resting place.

He was appointed harbor master of the Port of New York by Governor John Alsop King, reappointed by Governor Edwin Denison Morgan, and again by Governor Reuben Eaton Fenton.

Cashow was a Republican until the campaign of 1872, when he supported Horace Greeley and the Liberal Republican movement.

In 1880, he was elected supervisor of the town of Oyster Bay, a position he held for three years.

=== State Assembly ===
Cashow was elected to the New York State Assembly in 1887 and served in the 1888 session, representing Queens County's 1st District. He was succeeded by Solomon S. Townsend.

== Personal life and death ==
Cashow married Hester Craig. He was associated with the Farragut Fire Insurance Company of Manhattan for many years and was a volunteer fireman; the old Cashow Hose Company in Brooklyn was named after him.

He was a Freemason, belonging to Hohenlinden Lodge No. 56 and Nassau Chapter.

Cashow died on September 19, 1899, at his home in Mill Neck, New York. His burial location is unknown.

New York State Assembly
Preceded by Joseph Fitch	New York State Assembly; Queens County, 1st District; 1888	Succeeded by Solomon S. Townsend
