= Cold Spring Harbor, New York =

- Hamlet and census-designated place
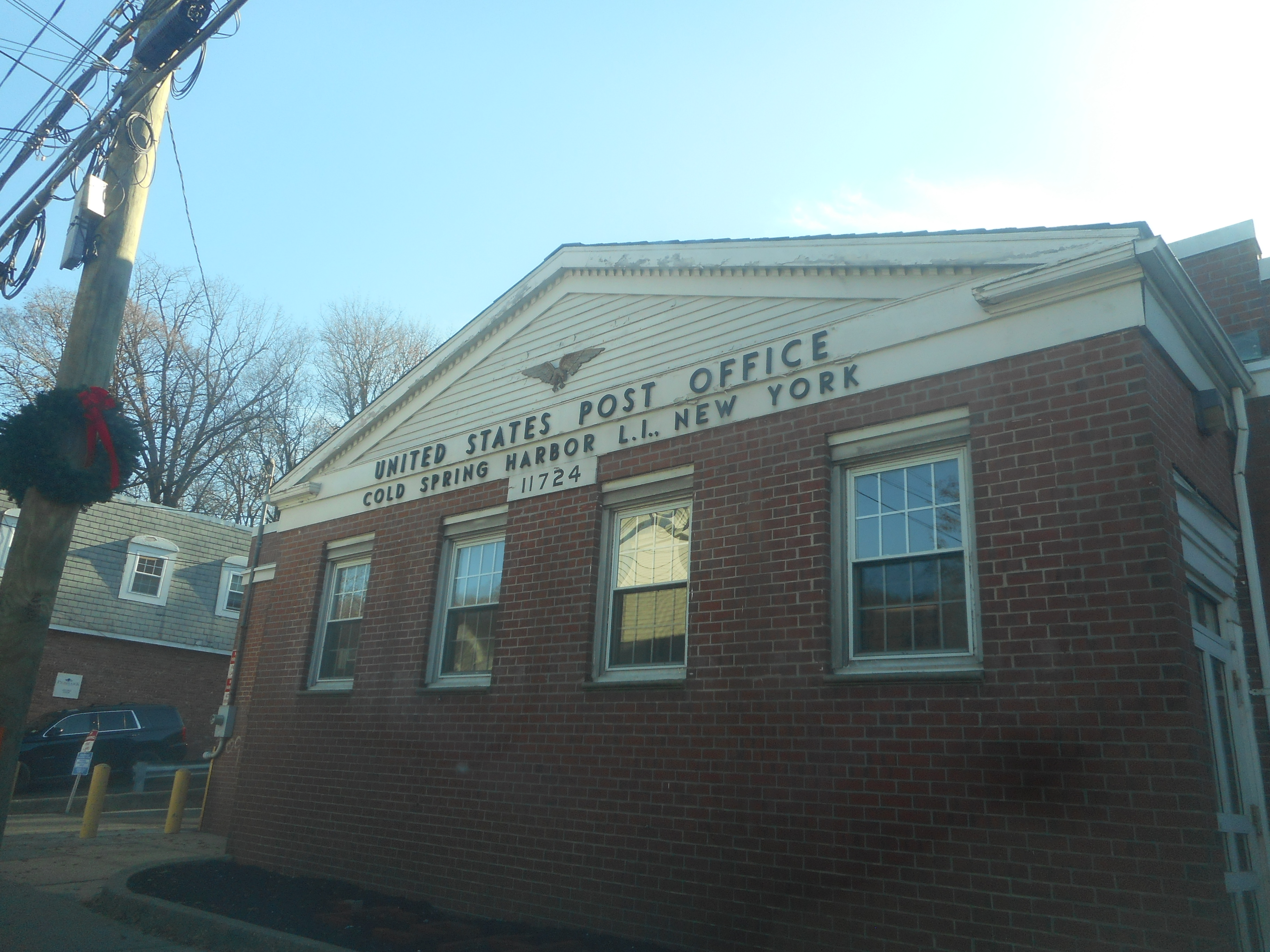
- The Cold Spring Harbor Post Office in 2019

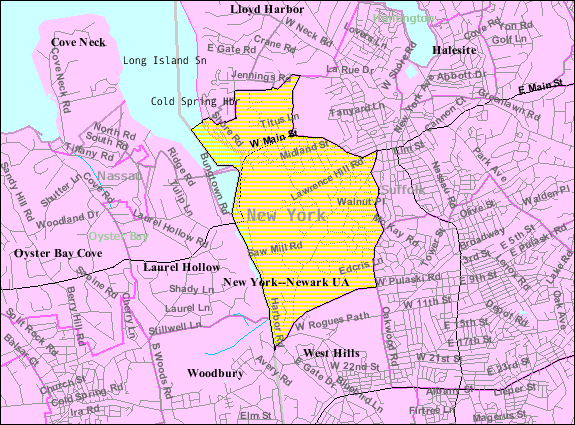
- U.S. Census map

- Location within the state of New York Cold Spring Harbor (New York) Cold Spring Harbor (the United States)
- Coordinates: 40°52′N 73°27′W
- Country: United States
- State: New York
- County: Suffolk
- Town: Huntington

Area
  - Total: 3.58 sq mi (9.28 km^{2})
  - Land: 3.41 sq mi (8.84 km^{2})
  - Water: 0.17 sq mi (0.44 km^{2})
- Elevation: 33 ft (10 m)

Population (2020)
  - Total: 3,064
  - Density: 898/sq mi (346.7/km^{2})
- Time zone: UTC-5 (Eastern (EST))
  - Summer (DST): UTC-4 (EDT)
- ZIP codes: 11724, 11743
- Area codes: 631, 934
- FIPS code: 36-16958
- GNIS feature ID: 0947073
- Website: www.coldspringharborvillage.org

Cold Spring Harbor is a hamlet and census-designated place (CDP) in the Town of Huntington, in Suffolk County, on the North Shore of Long Island in New York. As of the 2020 census, Cold Spring Harbor had a population of 3,064.

== History ==
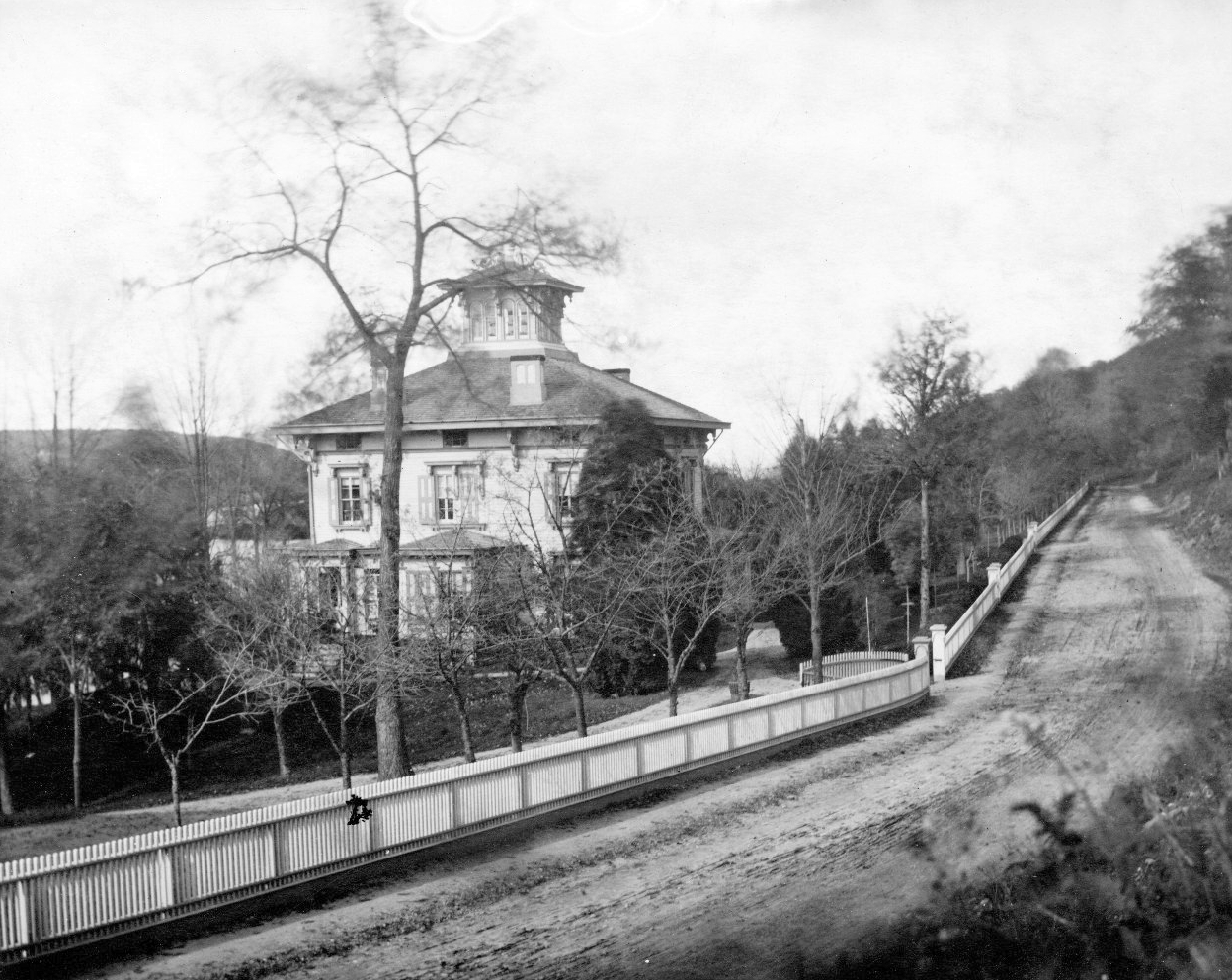
Photo of Cold Spring Harbor by George Bradford Brainerd

Cold Spring Harbor was named after the naturally cold freshwater springs that flow in the area. Its economy mainly tied to milling and port activities, it rose in prominence as a whaling community in the mid-nineteenth century. After the decline of whaling in the 1860s, it became a resort town with several hotels. In the 20th century it became known as the site of Cold Spring Harbor Laboratory, although the laboratory itself is located in the adjacent village of Laurel Hollow in Nassau County, which was called Cold Spring before incorporation.

Today it is primarily a bedroom community of New York City, with a small central business area running along Route 25A, and is home to many educational and cultural organizations: the Cold Spring Harbor Whaling Museum, the Cold Spring Harbor Fish Hatchery and Aquarium (also in Laurel Hollow), Dolan DNA Learning Center, the Uplands Farm Sanctuary (home of The Nature Conservancy's Long Island chapter), and a museum exhibition gallery run by Preservation Long Island.

== Geography ==
According to the United States Census Bureau, the CDP has a total area of 3.9 square miles (10 km^{2}), of which 3.7 square miles (9.6 km^{2}) is land and 0.2 square miles (0.52 km^{2}), or 4.86%, is water.

== Demographics ==
Historical population
Census	Pop.	Note	%±
2000	4,975		—
2010	5,070		1.9%
2020	3,064		−39.6%
U.S. Decennial Census

=== 2020 census ===
As of the 2020 census, Cold Spring Harbor had a population of 3,064. This represented a decrease from 4,975 in 2000. The median age was 42.6 years. 25.4% of residents were under the age of 18 and 16.5% of residents were 65 years of age or older. For every 100 females there were 97.7 males, and for every 100 females age 18 and over there were 94.7 males age 18 and over.

100.0% of residents lived in urban areas, while 0.0% lived in rural areas.

There were 975 households in Cold Spring Harbor, of which 39.2% had children under the age of 18 living in them. Of all households, 71.8% were married-couple households, 8.8% were households with a male householder and no spouse or partner present, and 15.9% were households with a female householder and no spouse or partner present. About 12.4% of all households were made up of individuals and 7.6% had someone living alone who was 65 years of age or older.

There were 1,020 housing units, of which 4.4% were vacant. The homeowner vacancy rate was 1.4% and the rental vacancy rate was 6.6%.

Racial composition as of the 2020 census
Race	Number	Percent
White	2,680	87.5%
Black or African American	11	0.4%
American Indian and Alaska Native	2	0.1%
Asian	119	3.9%
Native Hawaiian and Other Pacific Islander	0	0.0%
Some other race	41	1.3%
Two or more races	211	6.9%
Hispanic or Latino (of any race)	203	6.6%

=== 2000 census ===
There were 1,753 households, out of which 38.8% had children under the age of 18 living with them, 71.8% were married couples living together, 7.1% had a female householder with no husband present, and 19.2% were non-families. 14.9% of all households were made up of individuals, and 5.8% had someone living alone who was 65 years of age or older. The average household size was 2.84 and the average family size was 3.15.

In the CDP, the population was spread out, with 26.7% under the age of 18, 4.2% from 18 to 24, 28.9% from 25 to 44, 26.9% from 45 to 64, and 13.4% who were 65 years of age or older. The median age was 40 years. For every 100 females, there were 94.9 males. For every 100 females age 18 and over, there were 92.1 males.

The median income for a household in the CDP was $101,122, and the median income for a family was $112,441. Males had a median income of $78,984 versus $44,464 for females. The per capita income for the CDP was $52,403. About 1.3% of families and 2.2% of the population were below the poverty line, including 0.4% of those under age 18 and 3.6% of those age 65 or over.

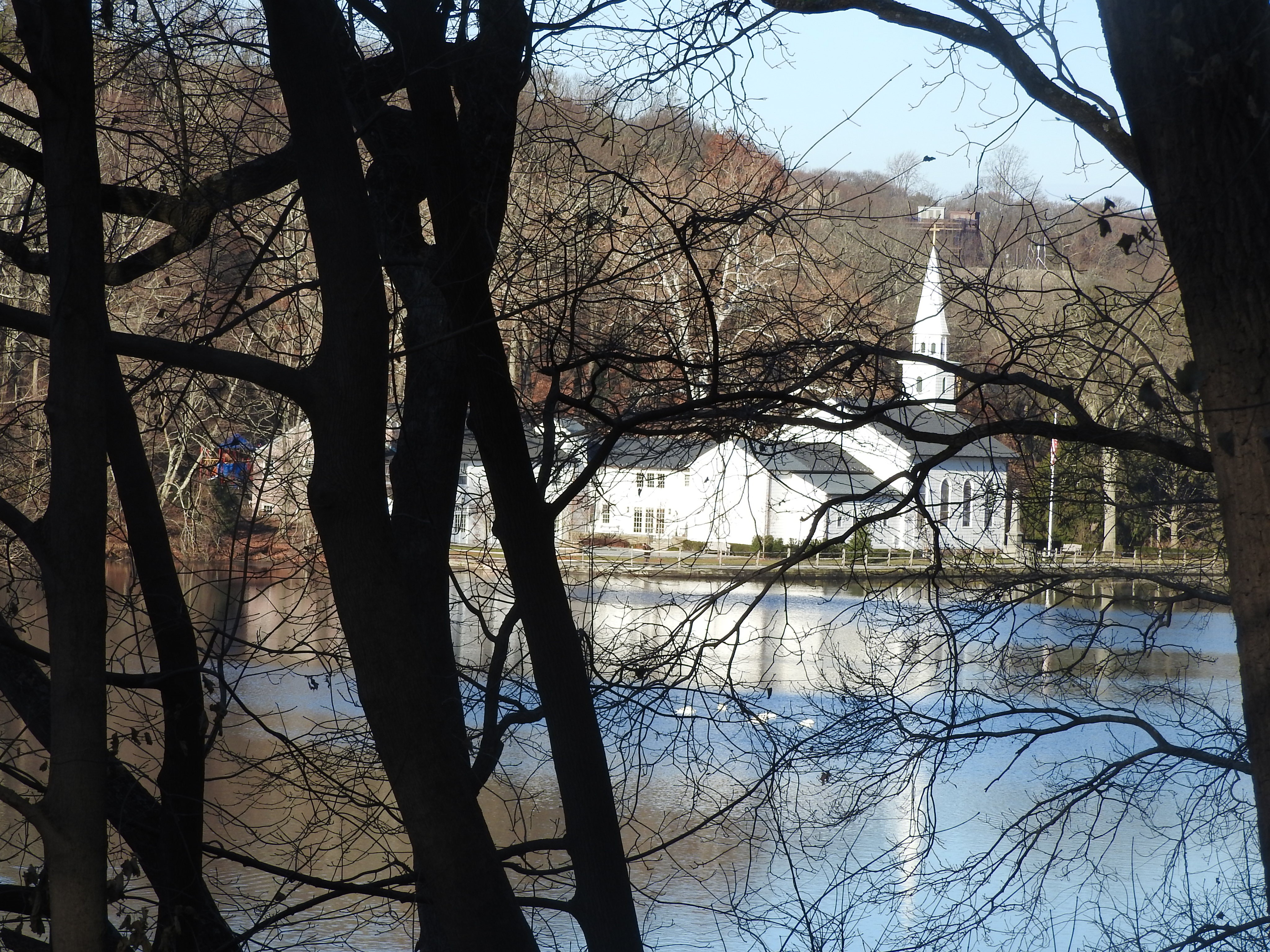
St. John's Episcopal Church

== Arts and culture ==
Residents of Cold Spring Harbor fall into one of two library districts, Cold Spring Harbor and Huntington, each of which correspond to their respective school districts, being the Cold Spring Harbor Central School District and the Huntington Union Free School District.

== Parks and recreation ==
Cold Spring Harbor State Park is located here.

== Education ==
Cold Spring Harbor is primarily served by the Cold Spring Harbor School District, and in parts by the Huntington Union Free School District.

== Infrastructure ==
=== Transportation ===
Cold Spring Harbor is served by the Cold Spring Harbor LIRR Station which is outside the hamlet in the neighboring hamlet of West Hills.

== Notable people ==
- Al Arbour lived in Cold Spring Harbor during his coaching career with the New York Islanders. He moved in 1999, some years after his retirement
- James L. Dolan, Cablevision CEO, graduated in 1974 from Cold Spring Harbor High School.
- Sean Hannity, Fox News host
- Nouria Hernandez, rector of the University of Lausanne (Switzerland) was a professor at the Cold Spring Harbor Laboratory.
- Rosalie Gardiner Jones, suffragette
- Barbara McClintock, Nobel Prize winner for the discovery of gene transposition, worked at the Cold Spring Harbor Laboratory for many years and grew corn for research purposes in Cold Spring Harbor.
- Scott Seiver, World Series of Poker bracelet winner and former world number one poker player, as ranked by the Global Poker Index
- Alex Foxen, World Series of Poker bracelet winner and 2019 Global Poker Index player of the year. Considered to be one of the best poker players in the world today.
- Kathleen Sullivan, a leading scholar in American constitutional law and Professor at Stanford Law School, was valedictorian at her graduation from Cold Spring Harbor High School in 1972
- Wally Szczerbiak, retired NBA basketball player, attended Cold Spring Harbor High School
- Evan Thomas, journalist, editor and author, grew up in Cold Spring Harbor.
- Norman Thomas, socialist, pacifist, and six-time United States presidential candidate for the Socialist Party of America, lived in Cold Spring Harbor until his death in 1968.
- Ryan Vesce, player for the San Jose Sharks in the NHL, grew up in Lloyd Harbor, adjacent to Cold Spring Harbor, and attended Cold Spring Harbor High School.
- James Watson, Nobel Prize winner, co-discoverer of the structure of DNA, and former Chancellor of the Cold Spring Harbor Laboratory
- Meg Whitman, former CEO of Hewlett-Packard and eBay, grew up in Lloyd Harbor and attended Cold Spring Harbor High School, graduating in 1973.

== In popular culture ==
- The novel Cold Spring Harbor (1986), by Richard Yates, is a quiet suburban tragedy set in the 1940s.
- In the Godzilla: The Series episode "Lizard Season", Cold Spring Harbor was used as the setting of the final battle between Godzilla and the Lizard Slayers, a trio of robots developed by the series' recurring villain Cameron Winter.
- Cold Spring Harbor is the name of Billy Joel's debut solo album from 1971 and is referenced in the song "Everybody Loves You Now": "You ain't got the time to go to Cold Spring Harbor no more." The album's cover has Joel in the hamlet. He would go on to purchase a house in the adjacent village of Lloyd Harbor with his then-wife Christie Brinkley in 1981.

== See also ==
- Cold Spring Harbor Laboratory
- Cold Spring Harbor (LIRR station)
- Cold Spring Harbor Whaling Museum
- Dolan DNA Learning Center
- AccuVein
