= Cold Springs Pony Express Station Ruins =

Coordinates: 39.39025°N 117.85449°W

- U.S. National Register of Historic Places
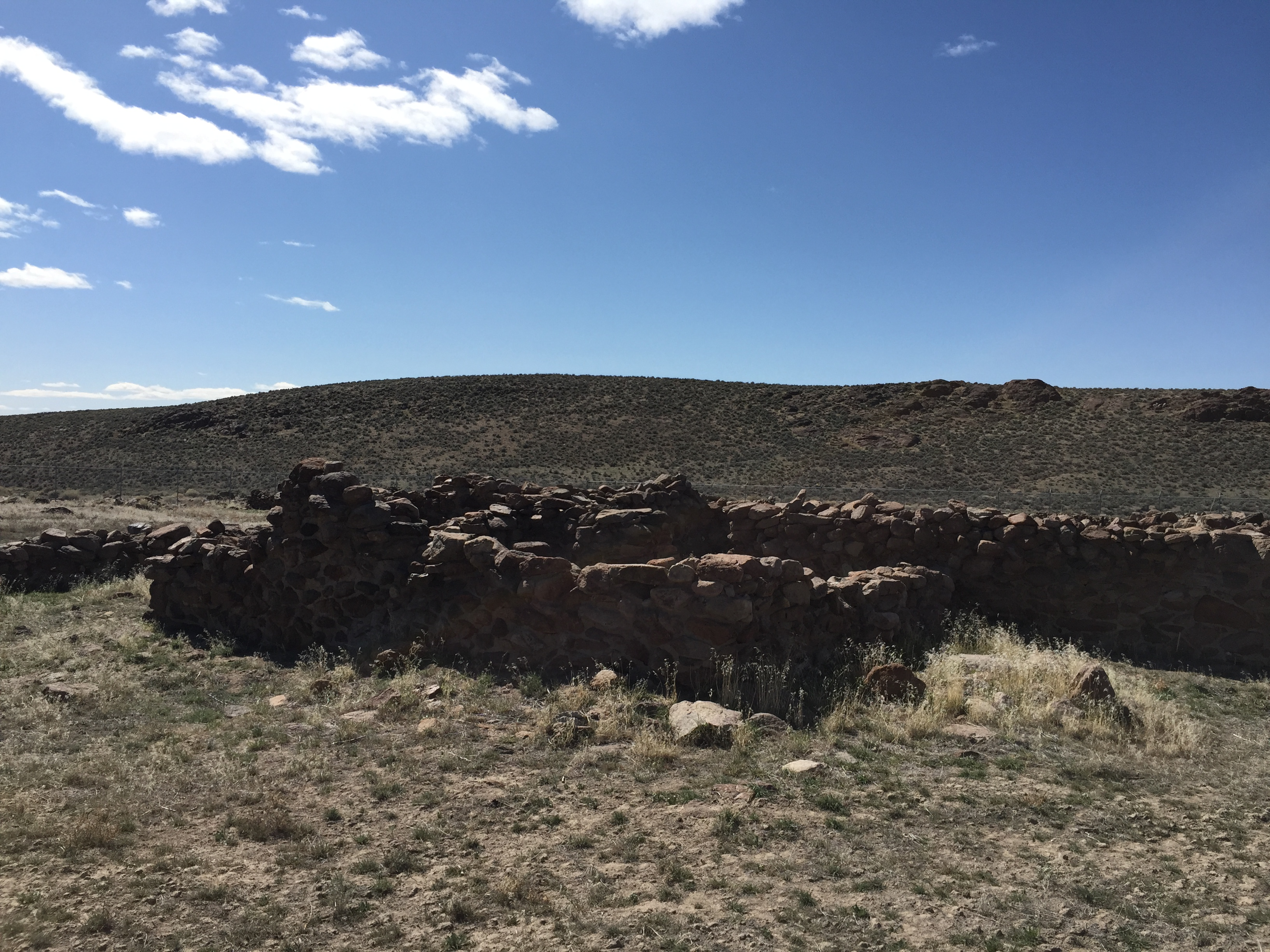

- Location within Nevada Location within the United States
- Nearest city: Frenchman, Nevada
- Area: 9.9 acres (4.0 ha)
- Built by: Kelley, J. G.
- Architect: Roberts, Bolivar
- NRHP reference No.: 78001718
- Added to NRHP: May 16, 1978

Cold Springs Pony Express Station Ruins, in Churchill County, Nevada near Frenchman, are the ruins of a Pony Express station built in 1860 or 1861. The ruins were listed as a 9.9-acre (4.0 ha) historic site on the National Register of Historic Places in 1972.

In May 1860 the station keeper was killed, the station burned and the stock driven off. Robert Haslam was the rider who discovered the body during what is credited to be the longest round trip ride of the Pony Express.

== Description ==
Cold Springs refers to three different sites: Cold Springs Station, Cold Springs Pony Express Station, and the Cold Springs Telegraph Repeater. The Station and Repeater are alternatively called Rock Springs.

Various sources accept the recognition of Cold Springs as a station. Cold Springs got the status of a home station from Raymond W. Settle and Mary Lund Settle in their jointly written book Saddles and Spurs: The Pony Express Saga (1972).

Considerable stone ruins of the station are there till date. Gun holes, bulky walls with windows, a fireplace, and the remaining corral can be still seen close by the station. This construction contains no roof as described by Sir Richard Francis Burton after his visit in 1860. For conservation and safeguarding, it has been structurally balanced.

== History ==
Bolivar Roberts and J. G. Kelly along with their unit built Cold Springs Station in March 1860 for the Central Overland California and Pikes Peak Express Company as they were expecting to start the journey of the Pony Express the next month. Different station keepers including Jim McNaughton, John Williams, and J. G. Kelly ran the operations of the station. Attacking the station in May 1860, Indians murdered the station keeper and looted the horses. The attackers returned to raid the spot after a few weeks. On 15 October 1860, Richard Burton visited the station and saw it as a partially built station house without a roof. The Overland Mail Company line cut Cold Springs out from its route around July 1861 preferring a site west of present U. S. 50.
