= Cold Spring Harbor Fish Hatchery and Aquarium =

Environmental education center in New York, United States

Coordinates: 40.8574°N 73.4648°W

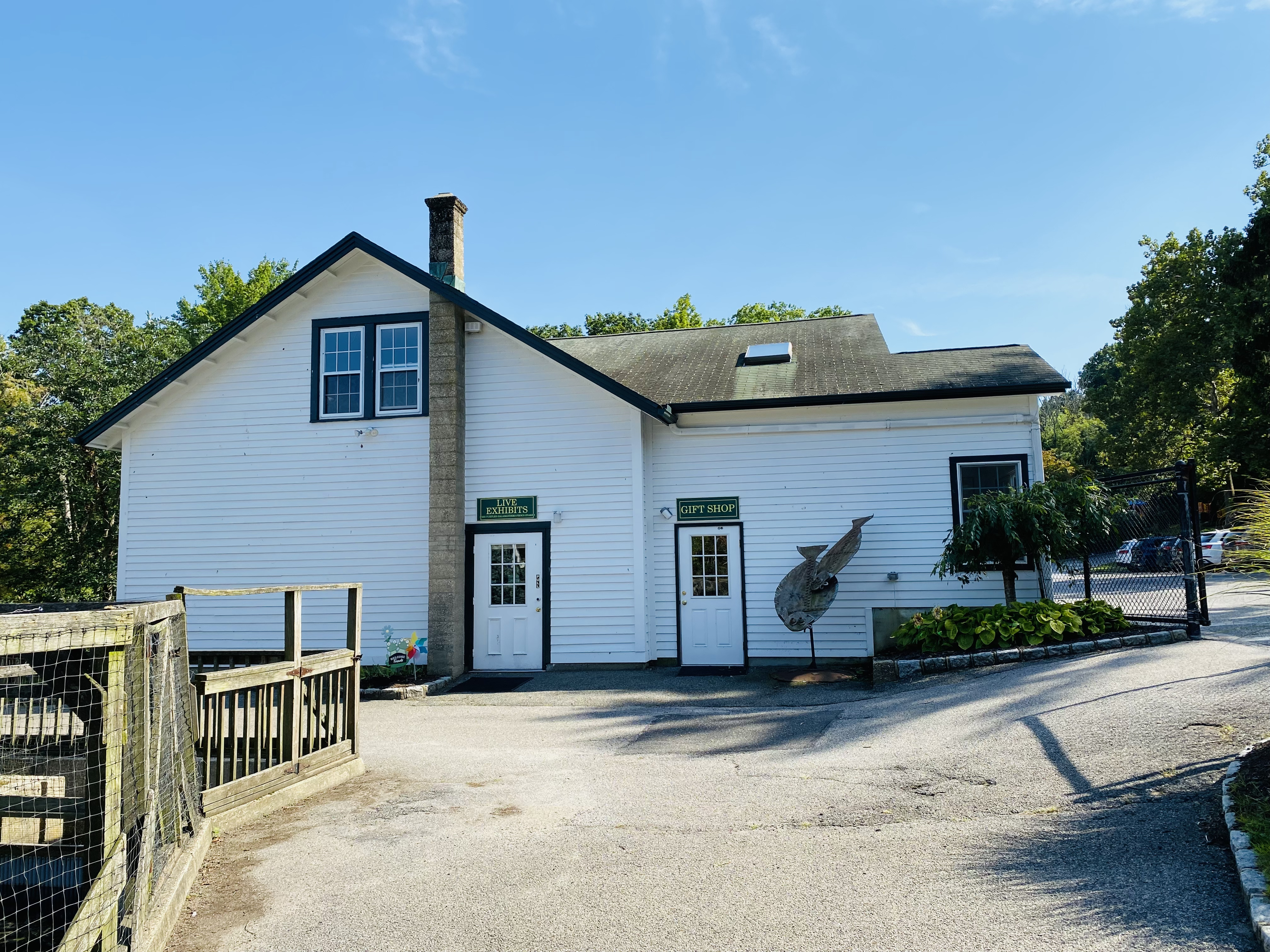
2022 image of the aquarium and gift shop

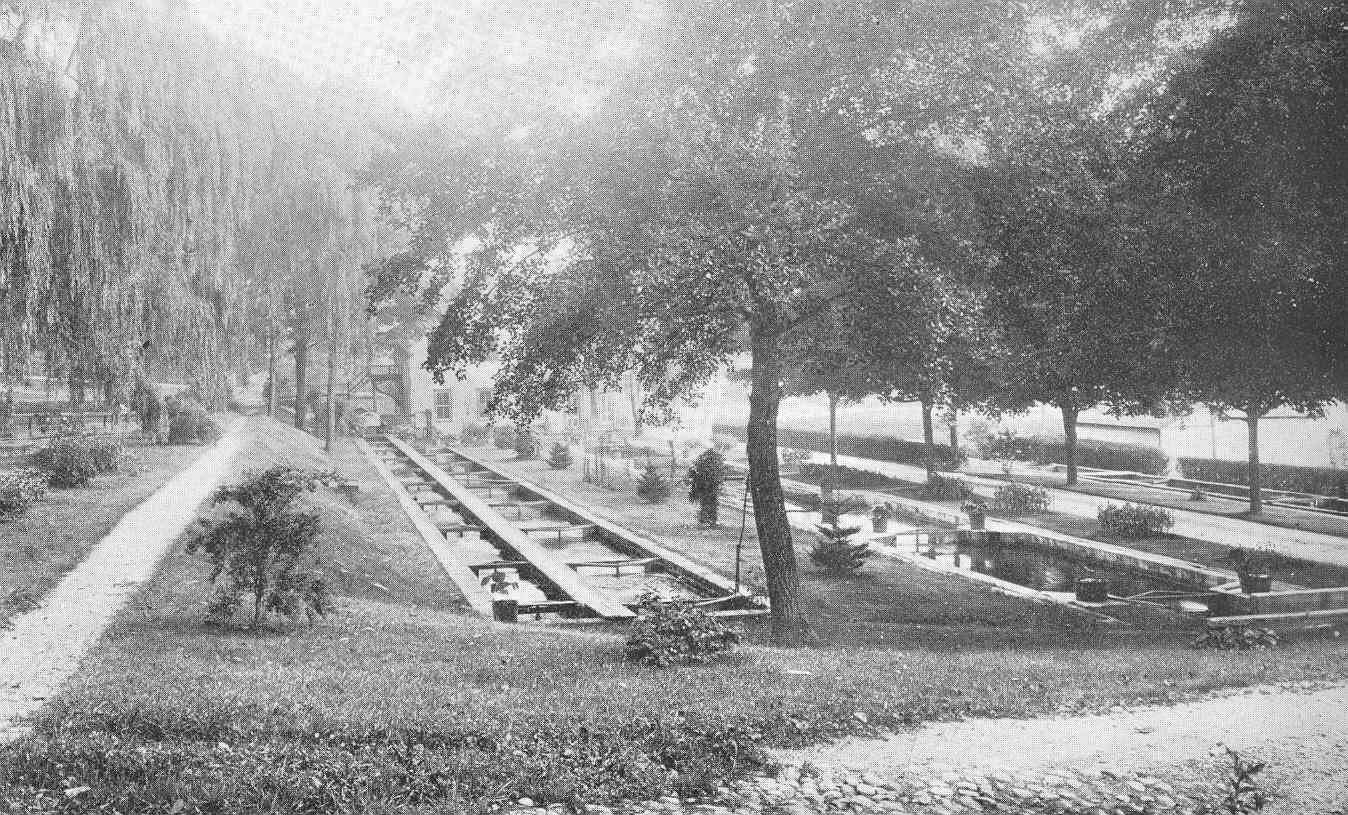
1914 image of the fish hatchery.

The Cold Spring Harbor Fish Hatchery & Aquarium is a non-profit environmental education center dedicated to educating its visitors about the freshwater ecosystems of New York State. It was founded in 1883 in Cold Spring Harbor, New York as a state trout hatchery, and served in that capacity until 1982, when it was reopened as a non-profit educational center by the Friends of the Cold Spring Harbor Fish Hatchery, Inc. Facilities include two aquarium buildings that feature New York State freshwater reptiles, fish and amphibians, and eight outdoor ponds with trout in various stages of development, as well as some with local fish. Catch and keep trout fishing is available year-round.

Cold Spring Harbor Fish Hatchery and Aquarium offers environmental education programs for schools and groups and summer camp programs.
