= Cold Springs Station Site =

- U.S. National Register of Historic Places
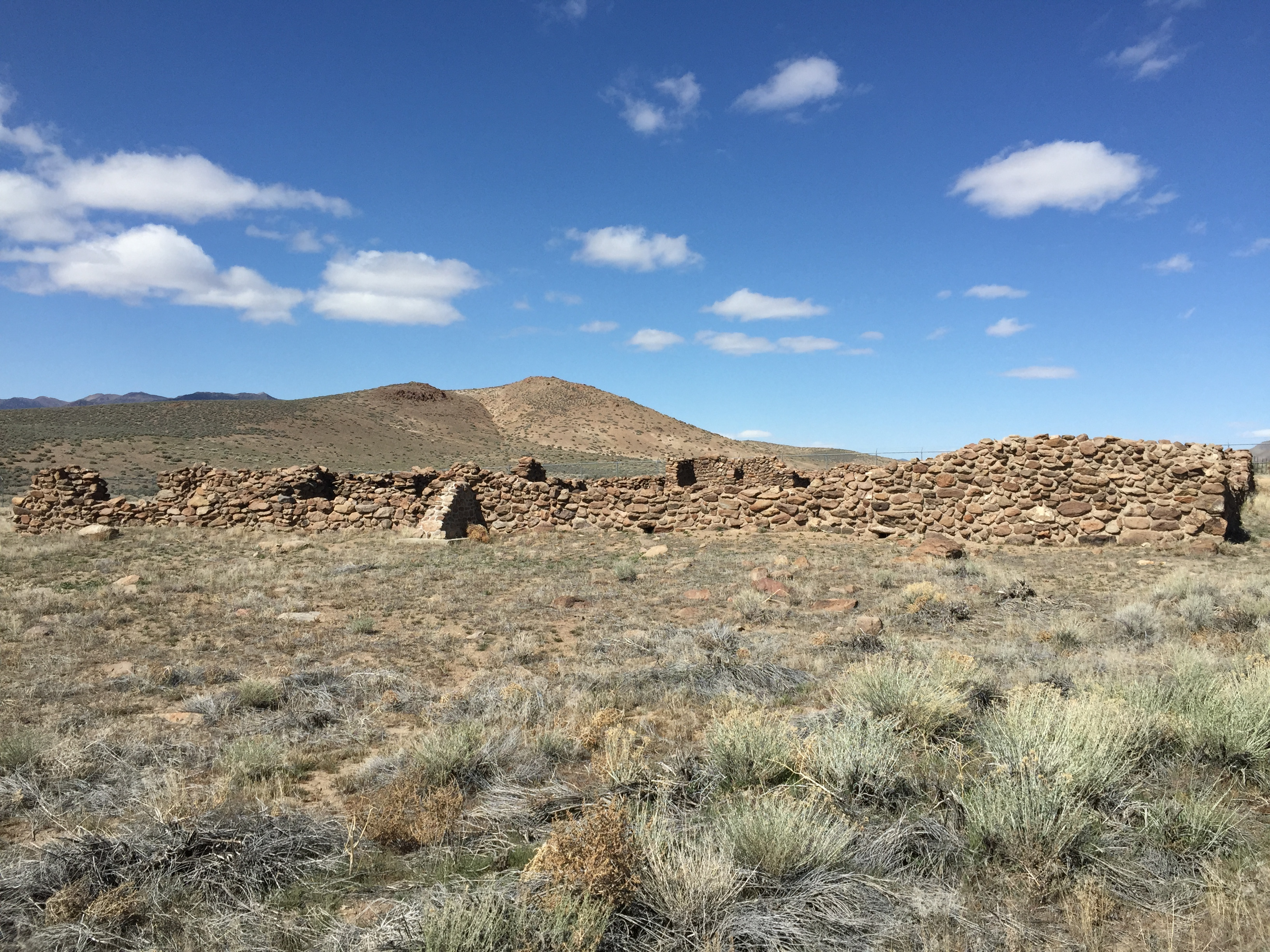

- Location within Nevada Location within the United States
- Location: 51 miles west of Austin on U.S. Route 50
- Nearest city: Austin, Nevada
- Coordinates: 39°23′31″N 117°51′12″W
- Area: 120 acres (49 ha)
- Built: 1861
- NRHP reference No.: 72000762
- Added to NRHP: February 23, 1972

The Cold Springs Station Site, west of Austin, Nevada, is a historic stagecoach station site that was active during 1861-1869 as a passenger and freight station, and later for freight. Only stone ruins remain. Nearby is the location of the original Cold Springs Pony Express Station Ruins.

Also known as the Rock Creek Stage Station, the site was listed on the National Register of Historic Places in 1972; the listing included 120 acres (49 ha).

== See also ==
- Cold Springs Pony Express Station Ruins
