= 116th New York State Legislature =

New York state legislative session

←	115th	117th	→
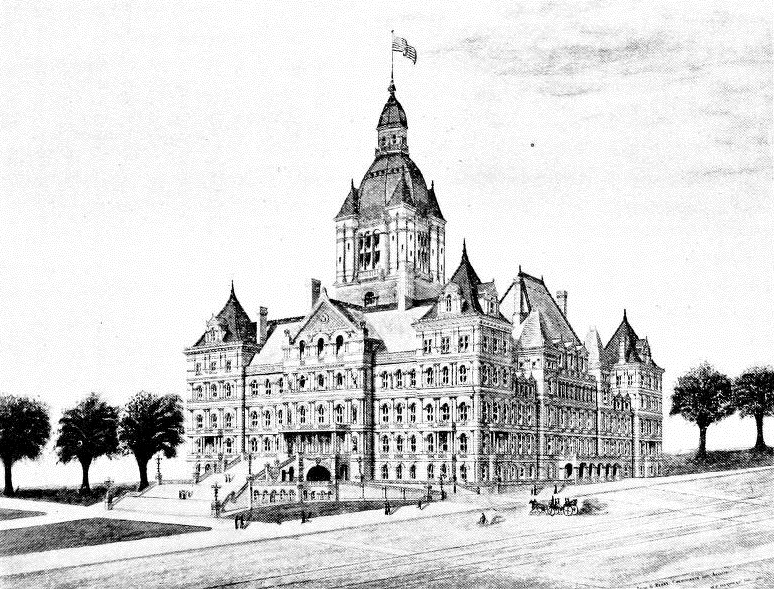
- New York State Capitol (1893)

Overview
- Legislative body: New York State Legislature
- Jurisdiction: New York, United States
- Term: January 1 – December 31, 1893

Senate
- Members: 32
- President: Lt. Gov. William F. Sheehan (D)
- Temporary President: Jacob A. Cantor (D)
- Party control: Democratic (17-14-1)

Assembly
- Members: 128
- Speaker: William Sulzer (D)
- Party control: Democratic (74-54)

Sessions
- 1st: January 3 – April 20, 1893

The 116th New York State Legislature, consisting of the New York State Senate and the New York State Assembly, met from January 3 to April 20, 1893, during the second year of Roswell P. Flower's governorship, in Albany.

== Background ==
Under the provisions of the New York Constitution of 1846, 32 Senators and 128 assemblymen were elected in single-seat districts; senators for a two-year term, assemblymen for a one-year term. The senatorial districts were made up of entire counties, except New York County (seven districts) and Kings County (three districts). The Assembly districts were made up of entire towns, or city wards, forming a contiguous area, all within the same county.

On April 26, 1892, the Legislature re-apportioned the Senate Districts and the number of assemblymen per county. Cattaraugus, Cayuga, Chautauqua, Jefferson, Niagara, Oneida, Oswego, Otsego, Saratoga, Ulster, Washington and Wayne counties lost one seat each; St. Lawrence County lost two seats; Erie and Queens counties gained one seat each; and Kings and New York counties gained six seats each.

At this time there were two major political parties: the Democratic Party and the Republican Party. The Prohibition Party, the Socialist Labor Party and a "People's Party" also nominated tickets.

== Elections ==
The 1892 New York state election was held on November 8. The only statewide elective offices up for election was carried by Charles Andrews, a Republican who was endorsed by the Democrats. The approximate party strength at this election, as expressed by the vote for Chief Judge of the Court of Appeals, was: Republican/Democratic 1,253,000; Prohibition 39,000; Socialist Labor 18,000; and People's Party 17,000.

== Sessions ==
The Legislature met for the regular session at the State Capitol in Albany on January 3, 1893; and adjourned on April 20.

William Sulzer (D) was elected Speaker with 71 votes against 52 for George R. Malby (R).

On January 17, the Legislature elected Edward Murphy Jr. (D) to succeed Frank Hiscock (R) as U.S. Senator from New York, for a six-year term beginning on March 4, 1893.

On January 27, the Legislature passed "An Act to amend chapter 398, of the Laws of 1892, entitled 'An Act to provide for a convention to revise and amend the Constitution'", calling a Constitutional Convention to meet in 1894.

== State Senate ==
=== Districts ===
Note: The Senators in the 116th Legislature had been elected in November 1891 for a two-year term under the apportionment of 1879, as listed below. Although the 115th Legislature (1892) had re-apportioned the Senate districts, the only election under the new apportionment was held in November 1893, to elect the senators who sat in the 117th and 118th Legislatures.

- 1st District: Queens and Suffolk counties
- 2nd District: 1st, 2nd, 5th, 6th, 8th, 9th, 10th, 12th and 22nd Ward of the City of Brooklyn, and the towns of Flatbush, Gravesend and New Utrecht in Kings County
- 3rd District: 3rd, 4th, 7th, 11th, 13th, 19th, 20th, 21st and 23rd Ward of the City of Brooklyn
- 4th District: 14th, 15th, 16th, 17th, 18th, 24th and 25th Ward of the City of Brooklyn, and the towns of New Lots and Flatlands in Kings County
- 5th District: Richmond County and the 1st, 2nd, 3rd, 5th, 6th, 8th, 14th and parts of the 4th and 9th Ward of New York City
- 6th District: 7th, 11th, 13th and part of the 4th Ward of NYC
- 7th District: 10th, 17th and part of the 15th, 18th and 21st Ward of NYC
- 8th District: 16th and part of the 9th, 15th, 18th, 20th and 21st Ward of NYC
- 9th District: Part of the 18th, 19th and 21st Ward of NYC
- 10th District: Part of the 12th, 19th, 20th, 21st and 22nd Ward of NYC
- 11th District: 23rd and 24th, and part of the 12th, 20th and 22nd Ward of NYC
- 12th District: Rockland and Westchester counties
- 13th District: Orange and Sullivan counties
- 14th District: Greene, Schoharie and Ulster counties
- 15th District: Columbia, Dutchess and Putnam counties
- 16th District: Rensselaer and Washington counties
- 17th District: Albany County
- 18th District: Fulton, Hamilton, Montgomery, Saratoga and Schenectady counties
- 19th District: Clinton, Essex and Warren counties
- 20th District: Franklin, Lewis and St. Lawrence counties
- 21st District: Oswego and Jefferson counties
- 22nd District: Oneida County
- 23rd District: Herkimer, Madison and Otsego counties
- 24th District: Chenango, Delaware and Broome counties
- 25th District: Onondaga and Cortland counties
- 26th District: Cayuga, Seneca, Tompkins and Tioga counties
- 27th District: Allegany, Chemung and Steuben counties
- 28th District: Ontario, Schuyler, Wayne and Yates counties
- 29th District: Monroe and Orleans counties
- 30th District: Genesee, Livingston, Niagara and Wyoming counties
- 31st District: Erie County
- 32nd District: Cattaraugus and Chautauqua counties

Note: There are now 62 counties in the State of New York. The counties which are not mentioned in this list had not yet been established, or sufficiently organized, the area being included in one or more of the abovementioned counties.

=== Members ===
The asterisk (*) denotes members of the previous Legislature who continued in office as members of this Legislature.

Note: For brevity, the chairmanships omit the words "...the Committee on (the)..."

District	Senator	Party	Notes
1st	Edward Floyd-Jones*	Democrat	Chairman of Game Laws
2nd	John McCarty*	Democrat	Chairman of State Prisons; and of Public Buildings
3rd	Joseph Aspinall*	Republican	
4th	Patrick H. McCarren*	Democrat	Chairman of Commerce and Navigation; and of Public Expenditures
5th	William L. Brown*	Democrat	Chairman of Affairs of Cities; and of Grievances
6th	John F. Ahearn*	Democrat	Chairman of Banks; and of Public Printing
7th	George F. Roesch*	Democrat	Chairman of Judiciary; and of Privileges and Elections
8th	Martin T. McMahon*	Democrat	Chairman of General Laws; and of Military Affairs
9th	Edward P. Hagan	Democrat	Chairman of Claims; died on February 20, 1893
9th	Thomas F. Cunningham	Democrat	elected on March 21 to fill vacancy
10th	Jacob A. Cantor*	Democrat	President pro tempore; Chairman of Finance; and of Rules
11th	George W. Plunkitt*	Democrat	Chairman of Miscellaneous Corporations; and of Printed and Engrossed Bills
12th	Charles P. McClelland*	Democrat	Chairman of Insurance; and of Joint Library
13th	William P. Richardson*	Republican	
14th	Clarence E. Bloodgood*	Democrat	Chairman of Roads and Bridges; and of Poor Laws
15th	Edward B. Osborne*	Democrat	Chairman of Affairs of Villages; and of Erection and Division of Towns and Counties; died on July 20, 1893
16th	John H. Derby*	Republican	
17th	Amasa J. Parker Jr.*	Democrat	Chairman of Taxation and Retrenchment; and of Public Health
18th	Harvey J. Donaldson*	Republican	
19th	Louis W. Emerson*	Republican	
20th	George Z. Erwin*	Republican	Minority Leader
21st	Joseph Mullin*	Republican	
22nd	Henry J. Coggeshall*	Republican	
23rd	John E. Smith*	Republican	
24th	Edmund O'Connor*	Republican	
25th	John A. Nichols*	Democrat	Chairman of Manufacture of Salt; and of Agriculture
26th	Thomas Hunter*	Republican	
27th	Charles E. Walker	Democrat	Chairman of Internal Affairs of Towns and Counties; and of Manufactures; died on June 6, 1893
28th	Charles T. Saxton*	Republican	
29th	Cornelius R. Parsons*	Republican	
30th	Greenleaf S. Van Gorder*	Republican	
31st	Matthias Endres*	Democrat	Chairman of Canals; and of Indian Affairs
32nd	James T. Edwards*	Ind. Rep./Dem.	Chairman of Railroads; and of Public Education

=== Employees ===
- Clerk: Charles T. Dunning
- Sergeant-at-Arms: Adelbert E. Tallmadge
- Doorkeeper: Joseph Jerge
- Stenographer: James M. Ruso
- Assistant Clerk: Charles W. Sutherland
- Librarian: James Oliver

== State Assembly ==
=== Assemblymen ===
The asterisk (*) denotes members of the previous Legislature who continued as members of this Legislature.

Note: For brevity, the chairmanships omit the words "...the Committee on (the)..."

District		Assemblymen	Party	Notes
Albany	1st	James Hilton	Democrat	Chairman of Agriculture
Albany	2nd	Howard P. Foster	Republican	
Albany	3rd	Myer Nussbaum	Republican	
Albany	4th	George S. Rivenburgh	Republican	
Allegany		Marcus M. Congdon*	Republican	
Broome		Israel T. Deyo*	Republican	
Cattaraugus		William E. Wheeler*	Republican	
Cayuga		Charles Clinton Adams*	Republican	
Chautauqua		Egburt E. Woodbury*	Republican	
Chemung		John M. Diven	Republican	
Chenango		Charles H. Stanton*	Republican	
Clinton		Henry E. Barnard	Democrat	
Columbia		Charles M. Bell	Republican	died on May 6, 1893
Cortland		James H. Tripp*	Republican	
Delaware		DeWitt Griffin	Republican	
Dutchess	1st	Edward H. Thompson	Republican	
Dutchess	2nd	James A. Vanderwater*	Democrat	
Erie	1st	John J. Clahan*	Democrat	Chairman of Canals
Erie	2nd	Jacob Goldberg*	Democrat	Chairman of Excise
Erie	3rd	Joseph Lenhard	Democrat	
Erie	4th	Edward Gallagher*	Republican	
Erie	5th	Henry H. Guenther*	Democrat	Chairman of General Laws
Erie	6th	Frank D. Smith	Democrat	Chairman of Public Lands and Forestry
Essex		George A. Stevens	Republican	
Franklin		Allen S. Matthews*	Republican	
Fulton and Hamilton		Philip Keck	Republican	
Genesee		Charles N. Reed*	Republican	
Greene		James Stead	Republican	
Herkimer		William C. Prescott	Republican	
Jefferson		Harrison Fuller*	Republican	
Kings	1st	William J. Plant*	Democrat	
Kings	2nd	John Cooney*	Democrat	Chairman of Judiciary
Kings	3rd	John J. O'Connor*	Democrat	Chairman of Fisheries and Game
Kings	4th	Joseph J. Cahill*	Democrat	Chairman of Unfinished Business
Kings	5th	Hubert G. Taylor	Republican	
Kings	6th	Patrick McGowan	Democrat	died on April 17, 1893
Kings	7th	Thomas F. Byrnes*	Democrat	Chairman of Federal Relations
Kings	8th	John A. Hennessey	Democrat	
Kings	9th	John Kelly*	Democrat	Chairman of Electricity, Gas and Water Supply
Kings	10th	William E. Melody	Democrat	
Kings	11th	William E. Shields*	Democrat	Chairman of Revision; died on August 14, 1893
Kings	12th	Louis C. Ott*	Democrat	Chairman of Printed and Engrossed Bills
Kings	13th	James F. Quigley*	Democrat	Majority Leader; Chairman of Ways and Means
Kings	14th	Joseph Bender	Democrat	
Kings	15th	George H. Deitsch	Democrat	
Kings	16th	Walter L. Durack	Democrat	
Kings	17th	Michael E. Finnigan	Democrat	
Kings	18th	James Graham	Democrat	
Lewis		Hugh Hughes	Republican	
Livingston		Jesse Roberts*	Republican	
Madison		Clarence W. Dexter*	Republican	
Monroe	1st	Samuel H. Stone	Republican	
Monroe	2nd	James M. E. O'Grady	Republican	
Monroe	3rd	William H. Denniston*	Republican	
Montgomery		Edward J. Hand	Democrat	
New York	1st	Patrick H. Duffy*	Democrat	Chairman of Public Health
New York	2nd	Timothy D. Sullivan*	Democrat	Chairman of Commerce and Navigation
New York	3rd	Jacob A. Mittnacht	Democrat	
New York	4th	Patrick H. Roche*	Democrat	Chairman of Insurance
New York	5th	Samuel J. Foley*	Democrat	Chairman of Taxation and Retrenchment
New York	6th	Moses Dinkelspiel*	Democrat	Chairman of Public Institutions
New York	7th	Otto Kempner	Democrat	
New York	8th	William H. Walker*	Democrat	Chairman of Claims
New York	9th	Walter W. Bahan	Democrat	
New York	10th	William Sulzer*	Democrat	elected Speaker; Chairman of Rules
New York	11th	Percival Farquhar*	Democrat	Chairman of Military Affairs
New York	12th	Frank A. O'Donnel	Democrat	
New York	13th	James H. Southworth*	Democrat	Chairman of Public Education
New York	14th	Daniel F. Martin*	Democrat	Chairman of Codes
New York	15th	Louis Drypolcher*	Democrat	Chairman of Labor and Industries
New York	16th	Joseph C. Wolff	Democrat	Chairman of Soldiers' Home
New York	17th	John Kerrigan	Democrat	Chairman of Trades and Manufactures
New York	18th	Thomas J. McManus*	Democrat	
New York	19th	Thomas C. O'Sullivan	Democrat	Chairman of Privileges and Elections
New York	20th	William H. McKeon	Democrat	
New York	21st	Louis H. Hahlo*	Democrat	Chairman of Charitable and Religious Societies
New York	22nd	Morris Jacoby	Democrat	
New York	23rd	William Bruce Ellison	Democrat	
New York	24th	Frederick P. Hummel	Democrat	
New York	25th	John Keleher	Democrat	
New York	26th	Louis Davidson	Democrat	
New York	27th	George P. Webster*	Democrat	Chairman of Affairs of Cities
New York	28th	James F. Reilly	Democrat	
New York	29th	Arthur C. Butts	Democrat	
New York	30th	Charles C. Marrin	Democrat	
Niagara		Elton T. Ransom	Democrat	
Oneida	1st	Cornelius Haley*	Dem./Labor	
Oneida	2nd	Chester W. Porter*	Republican	
Onondaga	1st	Duncan W. Peck	Democrat	Chairman of Indian Affairs
Onondaga	2nd	Jonathan Wyckoff	Republican	
Onondaga	3rd	William H. Hotaling	Republican	
Ontario		William L. Parkhurst	Republican	
Orange	1st	Howard Thornton*	Republican	
Orange	2nd	John Kinsila	Democrat	
Orleans		Adelbert J. McCormick*	Republican	
Oswego		Danforth E. Ainsworth	Republican	
Otsego		Walter L. Brown*	Republican	
Putnam		Hamilton Fish II	Republican	
Queens	1st	James Robinson	Democrat	
Queens	2nd	Samuel V. Searing	Democrat	
Queens	3rd	Solomon S. Townsend*	Democrat	Chairman of Railroads
Rensselaer	1st	William M. Keenan	Democrat	
Rensselaer	2nd	John M. Chambers	Republican	
Rensselaer	3rd	John J. Cassin*	Democrat	Chairman of Public Printing
Richmond		Hubbard R. Yetman*	Democrat	Chairman of Affairs of Villages
Rockland		Thomas Finegan*	Democrat	
St. Lawrence		George R. Malby*	Republican	Minority Leader
Saratoga		James Frank Terry	Republican	
Schenectady		Alvin J. Quackenbush*	Democrat	Chairman of Banks
Schoharie		Benjamin H. Avery	Democrat	
Schuyler		William H. Wait*	Republican	
Seneca		Henry Van De Mark	Democrat	
Steuben	1st	Gordon M. Patchin*	Republican	
Steuben	2nd	Herman E. Buck*	Republican	
Suffolk		Richard Higbie	Republican	
Sullivan		Uriah S. Messiter	Republican	
Tioga		Edward G. Tracy*	Republican	
Tompkins		Albert H. Pierson*	Republican	
Ulster	1st	Jacob Rice*	Democrat	Chairman of State Prisons
Ulster	2nd	James Lounsbery	Republican	unsuccessfully contested by George H. Bush (D)
Warren		Howard Conkling*	Republican	
Washington		William R. Hobbie	Republican	
Wayne		John E. Hough	Republican	
Westchester	1st	Thomas K. Fraser*	Democrat	Chairman of Internal Affairs
Westchester	2nd	Alfred Hennen Morris	Democrat	
Westchester	3rd	Edgar L. Ryder	Democrat	
Wyoming		Milo H. Olin*	Republican	
Yates		Morris F. Sheppard	Republican	

=== Employees ===
- Clerk: Charles R. DeFreest
- Sergeant-at-Arms: Michael B. Redmond
- Doorkeeper: Edward A. Moore
- Stenographer: Thomas Hassett

== Sources ==
- The New York Red Book compiled by Edgar L. Murlin (published by James B. Lyon, Albany NY, 1897; see pg. 384f for senate districts; pg. 404 for senators; pg. 410–417 for Assembly districts; and pg. 510 for assemblymen)
- New York State Legislative Souvenir for 1893 with Portraits of the Members of Both Houses by Henry P. Phelps
- MOVED LIKE CLOCKWORK in The New York Times on January 3, 1893
