= Senator Saxton =

Senator Saxton may refer to:

- Charles T. Saxton (1846–1903), New York State Senate
- Jim Saxton (born 1943), New Jersey State Senate
