= James F. Quigley =

American lawyer and politician

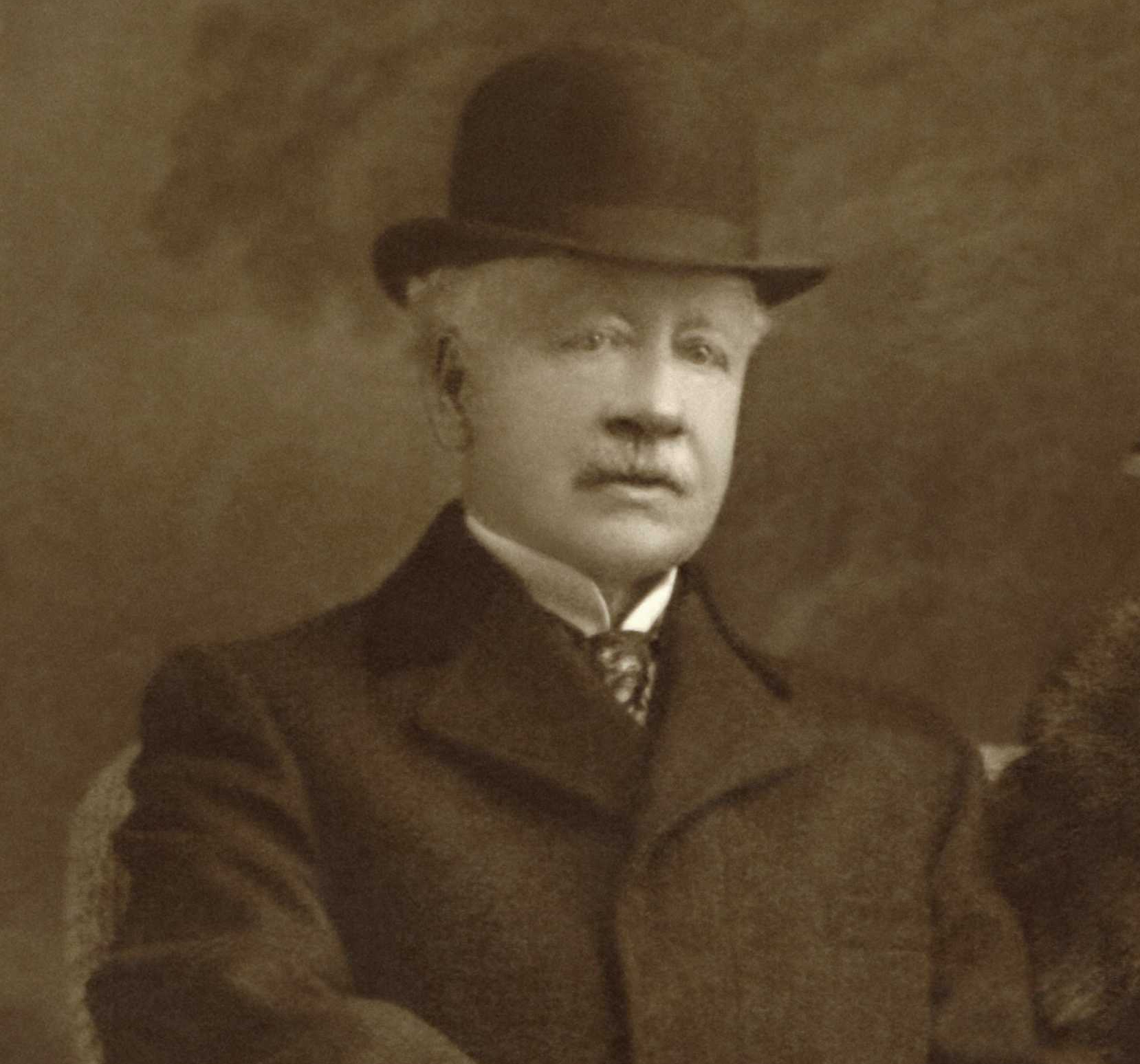
- Quigley c. 1925

Member of the New York State Assembly from the Kings County, 8th district
- In office January 1, 1891 – December 31, 1892
- Preceded by: William Blanchfield
- Succeeded by: John A. Hennessey

Member of the New York State Assembly from the Kings County, 13th district
- In office January 1, 1893 – December 31, 1893
- Preceded by: William Blanchfield
- Succeeded by: John A. Hennessey

Personal details
- Born: December 22, 1859 Greenpoint, New York, USA
- Died: November 12, 1935 (aged 75) Merrick, New York, USA
- Resting place: Holy Cross Cemetery

James Francis Quigley (December 22, 1859 – November 12, 1935) was an American lawyer and politician from New York. James was born on December 22, 1859, in Greenpoint, New York. He was the son of Irish immigrants Patrick B. Quigley and Elizabeth T. Culley. Patrick had a stage line that ran from Greenpoint to Fulton Ferry.

He attended Columbia Law School and passed the bar in 1885. He developed a law firm with John R. Farrar called Quigley & Farrar, which represented some of the leading Brooklyn firms.

In 1890, James was elected to the New York State Assembly, representing the Kings County 8th District. He served in the Assembly in 1891, 1892, and 1893. In 1893, he was the Majority Leader of the Assembly and chairman of the Ways and Means Committee.

In July 1894, James was appointed Police Justice to fill the deceased Robert E. Connelly's remaining term. He was removed from office in March 1895 for being too sympathetic with strikers.

In 1904, James was appointed Assistant Corporation Counsel and put in charge of the Bureau of Street Openings. He resigned in 1910.

James returned to practicing law, specializing in condemnation proceedings. He later moved from Bushwick to Merrick, Nassau County.

In 1893, John married Irish immigrant Mary Theresa Davidson in a ceremony officiated by Bishop Charles Edward McDonnell. Mary died in 1905. He later married Linda M. Phileo.

James died on November 12, 1935, in his Merrick home. He was buried in Holy Cross Cemetery.

New York State Assembly
Preceded by William Blanchfield	New York State Assembly; Kings County, 8th District; 1891-1892	Succeeded by John A. Hennessey
Preceded by New District	New York State Assembly; Kings County, 13th District; 1893	Succeeded by Francis E. Clark (New York)
Preceded by George H. Bush	New York State Assembly; Majority Leader; 1893	Succeeded by Danforth E. Ainsworth
