= 114th New York State Legislature =

New York state legislative session

←	113th	115th	→
- New York State Capitol (2009)

Overview
- Legislative body: New York State Legislature
- Jurisdiction: New York, United States
- Term: January 1 – December 31, 1891

Senate
- Members: 32
- President: Lt. Gov. Edward F. Jones (D)
- Temporary President: Jacob Sloat Fassett (R)
- Party control: Republican (19-13)

Assembly
- Members: 128
- Speaker: William F. Sheehan (D)
- Party control: Democratic (69-59)

Sessions
- 1st: January 6 – April 30, 1891

The 114th New York State Legislature, consisting of the New York State Senate and the New York State Assembly, met from January 6 to April 30, 1891, during the seventh year of David B. Hill's governorship, in Albany.

== Background ==
Under the provisions of the New York Constitution of 1846, 32 Senators and 128 assemblymen were elected in single-seat districts; senators for a two-year term, assemblymen for a one-year term. The senatorial districts were made up of entire counties, except New York County (seven districts) and Kings County (three districts). The Assembly districts were made up of entire towns, or city wards, forming a contiguous area, all within the same county.

At this time there were two major political parties: the Democratic Party and the Republican Party. In New York City, the Democrats were split into two factions: Tammany Hall and the "County Democracy". The Prohibition Party and the Socialist Labor Party also nominated tickets.

== Elections ==
The 1890 New York state election was held on November 4. The only statewide elective office up for election was carried by the incumbent Judge of the Court of Appeals Robert Earl, a Democrat who was endorsed by the Republicans. The approximate party strength at this election, as expressed by the vote for Judge of the Court of Appeals, was: Democratic/Republican 927,000; Prohibition 34,000; and Socialist Labor 13,000.

== Sessions ==
The Legislature met for the regular session at the State Capitol in Albany on January 6, 1891; and adjourned on April 30.

William F. Sheehan (D) was elected Speaker with 66 votes against 56 for Milo M. Acker (R).

On January 21, the Legislature elected Governor David B. Hill (D) to succeed William M. Evarts (R) as U.S. Senator from New York, for a six-year term beginning on March 4, 1891. However, Governor Hill remained in office until the end of his term on December 31, 1891, and took his seat in the U.S. Senate only on January 7, 1892.

== State Senate ==
=== Districts ===
- 1st District: Queens and Suffolk counties
- 2nd District: 1st, 2nd, 5th, 6th, 8th, 9th, 10th, 12th and 22nd Ward of the City of Brooklyn, and the towns of Flatbush, Gravesend and New Utrecht in Kings County
- 3rd District: 3rd, 4th, 7th, 11th, 13th, 19th, 20th, 21st and 23rd Ward of the City of Brooklyn
- 4th District: 14th, 15th, 16th, 17th, 18th, 24th and 25th Ward of the City of Brooklyn, and the towns of New Lots and Flatlands in Kings County
- 5th District: Richmond County and the 1st, 2nd, 3rd, 5th, 6th, 8th, 14th and parts of the 4th and 9th Ward of New York City
- 6th District: 7th, 11th, 13th and part of the 4th Ward of NYC
- 7th District: 10th, 17th and part of the 15th, 18th and 21st Ward of NYC
- 8th District: 16th and part of the 9th, 15th, 18th, 20th and 21st Ward of NYC
- 9th District: Part of the 18th, 19th and 21st Ward of NYC
- 10th District: Part of the 12th, 19th, 20th, 21st and 22nd Ward of NYC
- 11th District: 23rd and 24th, and part of the 12th, 20th and 22nd Ward of NYC
- 12th District: Rockland and Westchester counties
- 13th District: Orange and Sullivan counties
- 14th District: Greene, Schoharie and Ulster counties
- 15th District: Columbia, Dutchess and Putnam counties
- 16th District: Rensselaer and Washington counties
- 17th District: Albany County
- 18th District: Fulton, Hamilton, Montgomery, Saratoga and Schenectady counties
- 19th District: Clinton, Essex and Warren counties
- 20th District: Franklin, Lewis and St. Lawrence counties
- 21st District: Oswego and Jefferson counties
- 22nd District: Oneida County
- 23rd District: Herkimer, Madison and Otsego counties
- 24th District: Chenango, Delaware and Broome counties
- 25th District: Onondaga and Cortland counties
- 26th District: Cayuga, Seneca, Tompkins and Tioga counties
- 27th District: Allegany, Chemung and Steuben counties
- 28th District: Ontario, Schuyler, Wayne and Yates counties
- 29th District: Monroe and Orleans counties
- 30th District: Genesee, Livingston, Niagara and Wyoming counties
- 31st District: Erie County
- 32nd District: Cattaraugus and Chautauqua counties

Note: There are now 62 counties in the State of New York. The counties which are not mentioned in this list had not yet been established, or sufficiently organized, the area being included in one or more of the abovementioned counties.

=== Members ===
The asterisk (*) denotes members of the previous Legislature who continued in office as members of this Legislature.

District	Senator	Party	Notes
1st	Edward Hawkins*	Democrat	
2nd	John C. Jacobs*	Democrat	
3rd	James W. Birkett*	Republican	
4th	Patrick H. McCarren*	Democrat	
5th	William L. Brown*	Tammany Dem.	
6th	John F. Ahearn*	County Dem.	
7th	George F. Roesch*	Tammany Dem.	
8th	Lispenard Stewart*	Republican	
9th	Charles A. Stadler*	Tammany Dem.	
10th	Jacob A. Cantor*	Tammany Dem.	
11th	Eugene S. Ives*	Tammany Dem.	
12th	William H. Robertson*	Republican	
13th	William P. Richardson*	Republican	
14th	John J. Linson*	Democrat	
15th	Gilbert A. Deane*	Republican	died on November 20, 1891
16th	Michael F. Collins*	Democrat	
17th	Norton Chase*	Democrat	
18th	Harvey J. Donaldson*	Republican	
19th	Louis W. Emerson*	Republican	
20th	George Z. Erwin*	Republican	
21st	George B. Sloan*	Republican	
22nd	Henry J. Coggeshall*	Republican	
23rd	Titus Sheard*	Republican	
24th	Edmund O'Connor*	Republican	
25th	Francis Hendricks*	Republican	seat vacated on September 28, 1891, upon taking office as Collector of the Port of New York
26th	Thomas Hunter*	Republican	
27th	J. Sloat Fassett*	Republican	President pro tempore; seat vacated on August 1, 1891, upon taking office as Collector of the Port of New York
28th	Charles T. Saxton*	Republican	
29th	Donald McNaughton*	Democrat	
30th	Greenleaf S. Van Gorder*	Republican	
31st	John Laughlin*	Republican	
32nd	Commodore P. Vedder*	Republican	

=== Employees ===
- Clerk: John S. Kenyon
- Sergeant-at-Arms: Charles V. Schram
- Doorkeeper: Edward R. Gibbons
- Stenographer: George H. Thornton

== State Assembly ==
=== Assemblymen ===
The asterisk (*) denotes members of the previous Legislature who continued as members of this Legislature.

District		Assemblymen	Party	Notes
Albany	1st	Michael J. Nolan*	Democrat	
Albany	2nd	Walter E. Ward	Republican	
Albany	3rd	Galen R. Hitt*	Democrat	
Albany	4th	John T. Gorman	Democrat	
Allegany		Addison S. Thompson*	Republican	
Broome		Israel T. Deyo*	Republican	
Cattaraugus	1st	Burton B. Lewis*	Republican	
Cattaraugus	2nd	James S. Whipple*	Republican	
Cayuga	1st	George W. Dickinson*	Republican	
Cayuga	2nd	William Leslie Noyes	Republican	
Chautauqua	1st	Walter C. Gifford	Republican	
Chautauqua	2nd	Egburt E. Woodbury	Republican	
Chemung		Robert P. Bush*	Democrat	
Chenango		Harvey A. Truesdell	Republican	
Clinton		Alfred Guibord*	Republican	
Columbia		Aaron B. Gardenier*	Republican	unsuccessfully contested by Henry L. Warner (D)
Cortland		Rufus T. Peck*	Republican	
Delaware		Henry Davie	Democrat	
Dutchess	1st	Willard H. Mase*	Republican	
Dutchess	2nd	Edward B. Osborne	Democrat	
Erie	1st	William F. Sheehan*	Democrat	elected Speaker; on November 3, 1891, elected Lieutenant Governor
Erie	2nd	Matthias Endres*	Democrat	
Erie	3rd	Edward Gallagher	Republican	
Erie	4th	Henry H. Guenther*	Democrat	
Erie	5th	Frank D. Smith	Democrat	
Essex		Walter D. Palmer	Republican	
Franklin		William C. Stevens*	Republican	
Fulton and Hamilton		John Christie*	Republican	
Genesee		Francis T. Miller*	Republican	
Greene		Omar V. Sage*	Democrat	
Herkimer		Henry H. Green	Republican	
Jefferson	1st	Henry J. Lane*	Republican	
Jefferson	2nd	Isaac Mitchell*	Republican	
Kings	1st	Joseph J. Cahill	Democrat	
Kings	2nd	Bernard J. McBride*	Democrat	
Kings	3rd	John Cooney*	Democrat	
Kings	4th	John J. O'Connor*	Democrat	
Kings	5th	John Kelly*	Democrat	
Kings	6th	William E. Shields*	Democrat	
Kings	7th	Adam Schaaff*	Democrat	
Kings	8th	James F. Quigley	Democrat	
Kings	9th	Charles W. Sutherland	Democrat	
Kings	10th	Thomas F. Byrnes*	Democrat	
Kings	11th	Joseph Aspinall	Republican	unsuccessfully contested by Francis H. Reinhard (D);
Kings	12th	Mortimer C. Earl	Democrat	
Lewis		G. Henry P. Gould	Democrat	
Livingston		Elias H. Davis*	Republican	
Madison		Samuel R. Mott*	Republican	
Monroe	1st	Frank M. Jones*	Republican	
Monroe	2nd	Cornelius R. Parsons	Rep./Un. Labor	
Monroe	3rd	William H. Denniston	Republican	
Montgomery		W. Barlow Dunlap	Republican	contested, seat vacated on February 25
Montgomery		John F. Dwyer	Democrat	seated on February 26
New York	1st	Patrick H. Duffy*	Tammany Dem.	
New York	2nd	Timothy D. Sullivan*	Tammany Dem.	
New York	3rd	Percival Farquhar	Tammany Dem.	
New York	4th	Patrick H. Roche	Tammany Dem.	
New York	5th	Dominick F. Mullaney*	Tammany Dem.	
New York	6th	Samuel J. Foley	Tammany Dem.	
New York	7th	Martin T. McMahon	Democrat	
New York	8th	John E. Brodsky	Ind. Rep.	
New York	9th	Wright Holcomb	Tammany Dem.	
New York	10th	William Sohmer*	Tammany Dem.	
New York	11th	William M. Lawrence	Democrat	
New York	12th	Moses Dinkelspiel*	Democrat	
New York	13th	James H. Southworth	Democrat	
New York	14th	William Sulzer*	Tammany Dem.	
New York	15th	Louis Drypolcher	Tammany Dem.	
New York	16th	Walter G. Byrne*	Tammany Dem.	
New York	17th	John Kerrigan*	Democrat	
New York	18th	Daniel F. Martin	Tammany Dem.	
New York	19th	John Connelly*	Tammany Dem.	
New York	20th	Myer J. Stein*	Tammany Dem.	
New York	21st	Dabid M. Hildreth Jr.	Republican	
New York	22nd	Joseph Blumenthal*	Democrat	
New York	23rd	George P. Webster*	Tammany Dem.	
New York	24th	Christopher C. Clarke*	Tammany Dem.	
Niagara	1st	Garwood L. Judd	Democrat	
Niagara	2nd	Levi Parsons Gillette	Democrat	
Oneida	1st	Cornelius Haley	Dem./Labor	
Oneida	2nd	James L. Dempsey*	Democrat	
Oneida	3rd	Russell S. Johnson*	Republican	unsuccessfully contested by Leonard E. Adsit (D)
Onondaga	1st	Howard G. White*	Republican	
Onondaga	2nd	William Kennedy	Republican	
Onondaga	3rd	Ignatius Sawmiller*	Republican	
Ontario		Frank O. Chamberlain	Republican	
Orange	1st	Grant B. Taylor	Democrat	
Orange	2nd	Michael N. Kane	Democrat	
Orleans		Wallace L'Hommedieu*	Republican	
Oswego	1st	Nevada N. Stranahan*	Republican	unsuccessfully contested by William B. Howard (D);
Oswego	2nd	Wilbur H. Selleck*	Republican	
Otsego	1st	Oscar F. Lane*	Democrat	
Otsego	2nd	Walter L. Brown	Republican	
Putnam		Hamilton Fish II*	Republican	
Queens	1st	Solomon S. Townsend*	Democrat	
Queens	2nd	James A. McKenna	Democrat	
Rensselaer	1st	James M. Riley*	Democrat	
Rensselaer	2nd	Levi E. Worden	Republican	
Rensselaer	3rd	John W. McKnight*	Democrat	
Richmond		John Croak	Democrat	
Rockland		Frank P. Demarest	Democrat	
St. Lawrence	1st	George R. Malby	Republican	
St. Lawrence	2nd	John C. Keeler	Republican	
St. Lawrence	3rd	William Bradford*	Republican	
Saratoga	1st	Cornelius R. Sheffer*	Republican	contested by Robert O. Davis (D)
Saratoga	2nd	Lewis Varney	Republican	
Schenectady		Alvin J. Quackenbush	Democrat	
Schoharie		Ambrose R. Hunting	Democrat	
Schuyler		Charles T. Willis*	Republican	
Seneca		William Harrison Dunham	Democrat	
Steuben	1st	Grattan H. Brundage	Republican	
Steuben	2nd	Milo M. Acker*	Republican	Minority Leader
Suffolk		James H. Pierson*	Republican	
Sullivan		George M. Beakes	Democrat	
Tioga		Royal W. Clinton	Republican	contested by Enoch S. Williams (D)
Tompkins		Nelson Stevens*	Republican	
Ulster	1st	George M. Brink	Republican	
Ulster	2nd	Jacob Rice*	Democrat	
Ulster	3rd	George H. Bush*	Democrat	
Warren		William M. Cameron	Democrat	
Washington	1st	William D. Stevenson	Republican	
Washington	2nd	Albert Johnson*	Republican	
Wayne	1st	Elliott B. Norris	Democrat	
Wayne	2nd	Richard P. Groat*	Republican	
Westchester	1st	Charles P. McClelland	Democrat	Majority Floor Leader
Westchester	2nd	William Ryan	Democrat	
Westchester	3rd	James W. Husted*	Republican	
Wyoming		I. Sam Johnson*	Republican	
Yates		Everett Brown	Republican	

=== Employees ===
- Clerk: Charles R. DeFreest
- Clerk for the Committee on Cities: Morris Jacoby
- Sergeant-at-Arms: Michael B. Redmond
- Doorkeeper: Edward A. Moore
- First Assistant Doorkeeper: Lawrence D. Fitzpatrick
- Second Assistant Doorkeeper: Kenneth D. L. Nivin
- Stenographer: Thomas Hassett

== Sources ==
- The New York Red Book compiled by Edgar L. Murlin (published by James B. Lyon, Albany NY, 1897; see pg. 384f for senate districts; pg. 403 for senators; pg. 410–417 for Assembly districts; and pg. 508f for assemblymen)
- Biographical sketches of the members of the Legislature in The Evening Journal Almanac (1891)
- THE ASSEMBLY SLATE FIXED in NYT on January 6, 1891
