= Harrison Fuller =

American politician (1845–1904)

Harrison Fuller (August 1, 1845 – June 2, 1904) was an American farmer and politician from New York.

== Life ==
Fuller was born on August 1, 1845, in the family homestead in Adams, New York. His parents were William Fuller, a farmer, and Martha Keep. He attended the Union Academy in Belleville.

After he finished school, Fuller worked as a farmer. He eventually became one of the largest landowners in the county, cultivating more than 1,600 acres. He was active in the Watertown Produce Exchange and served as president and vice-president of the Jefferson County Agricultural Society. He was also interested in business and industrial ventures in and around Adams, serving as vice-president of Farmers' National Bank of Adams and a director of the Watertown National Bank. He lived in Adams Centre.

In 1891, Fuller was elected to the New York State Assembly as a Republican, representing the Jefferson County 1st District. He served in the Assembly in 1892, 1893, 1894, and 1895. While in the Assembly, he introduced several measures, including one that provided for the compulsory education of children in the state.

Fuller married Ella Snell in 1865. They had a daughter, Martha Annette. He was a freemason, a Royal Arch Mason, a Knight Templar, and a Shriner.

Fuller died in Watertown City Hospital on June 2, 1904, after suffering an accident where he was thrown from his buggy. He was buried in Honeyville Cemetery.

New York State Assembly
Preceded by Henry J. Lane	New York State Assembly; Jefferson County, 1st District; 1892	Succeeded by District Abolished
Preceded by District Created	New York State Assembly; Jefferson County; 1893-1895	Succeeded by District Abolished
