= William L. Brown (politician) =

American politician

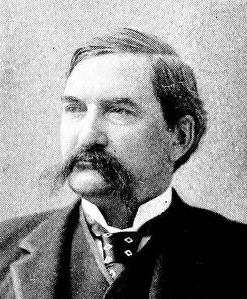
William L. Brown (1893)

William Lee Brown (December 25, 1840 Vermont – December 13, 1906 Great Barrington, Berkshire County, Massachusetts) was an American newspaper publisher and politician from Ohio and New York.

== Life ==
The family removed to Mahoning County, Ohio, soon after William was born. He taught school in Ohio, and then in Copiah County, Mississippi, until 1861. During the American Civil War he fought with the 88th and the 125th Ohio Volunteers.

After the war, he removed to Virginia City, then the capital of the Montana Territory. He was Chief Clerk of the Territorial Legislature, and also engaged in gold mining.

A few years later, he returned to Youngstown, Ohio. He was a delegate from Ohio to the 1872 and 1876 Democratic National Conventions. In 1874, he was aide-de-camp to Gov. William Allen, with the rank of colonel. In 1875, he was elected to the Ohio State Senate. From 1875 to 1880, he published The Vindicator in Youngstown.

In 1880, he removed to New York City and became a partner of Benjamin Wood, co-publishing the New York Daily News.

Brown was a delegate from New York to the 1884 and 1888 Democratic National Conventions; and a member of the New York State Senate (5th D.) from 1890 to 1893, sitting in the 113th, 114th, 115th and 116th New York State Legislatures.

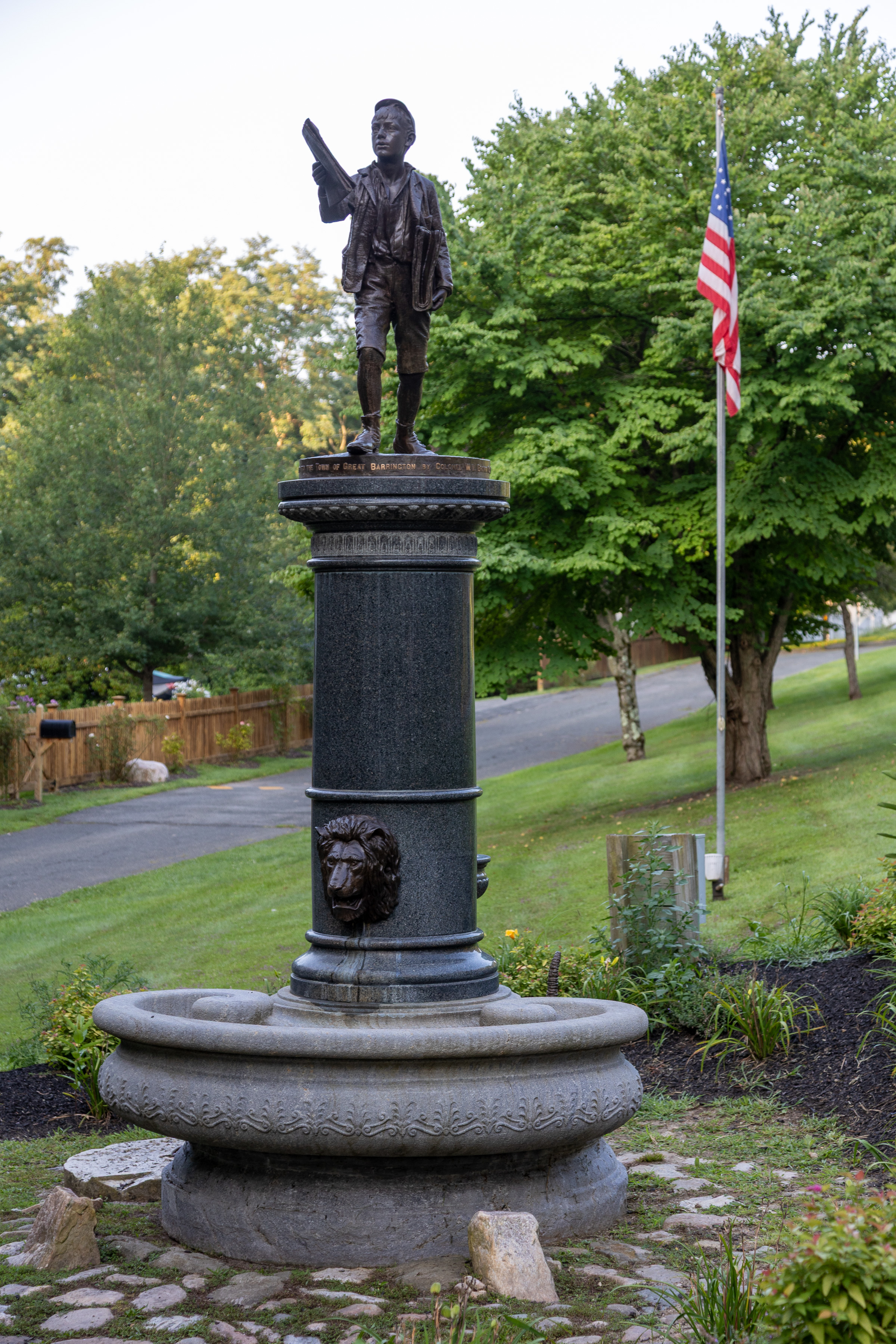
Newsboy monument

In 1895, Brown funded a monument to newsboys in Great Barrington, Massachusetts. The monument features a 5-foot tall bronze statue of a newspaper carrier, on top of a ten-foot tall base. The monument features a watering trough for horses, dogs and cats.

After the death of Benjamin Wood in 1900, his widow Ida Wood ousted Brown from the management of the paper, and Brown retired to an estate in Great Barrington, Massachusetts, where he engaged in horse and cattle breeding. He died there on December 13, 1906.

== Sources ==
- The New York Red Book compiled by Edgar L. Murlin (published by James B. Lyon, Albany NY, 1897; pg. 403f)
- New York State Legislative Souvenir for 1893 with Portraits of the Members of Both Houses by Henry P. Phelps (pg. 8f)
- Biographical sketches of the members of the Legislature in The Evening Journal Almanac (1892)
- COL. BROWN AND HIS PAPER PASS AWAY TOGETHER in NYT on December 14, 1906
- History of Youngstown and the Mahoning Valley, Ohio by Joseph Green Butler, Jr. (1921; Vol. I, pg. 348)

New York State Senate
Preceded by Michael C. Murphy	New York State Senate; 5th District; 1890–1893	Succeeded by Daniel Bradley
