= John Kerrigan (New York City) =

American politician

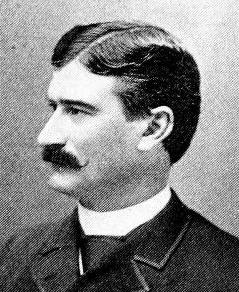
- Kerrigan in 1893

Member of the New York State Assembly for New York County, 17th District
- In office: 1913–1915; 1893; 1889–1891

Personal details
- Born: March 17, 1851
- Occupation: American politician

John Kerrigan (born March 17, 1851, in Ireland) was an American politician from New York.

== Life ==
The family emigrated in 1852 to the United States, and settled in New York City. He attended the public schools, and then became a carpenter. Later he engaged in the real estate business.

Kerrigan was a member of the New York State Assembly (New York Co., 17th D.) in 1889, 1890, 1891 and 1893, and was Chairman of the Committee on Trade and Manufactures in 1893.

He was again a member of the State Assembly (New York Co., 11th D.) in 1913, 1914 and 1915. The Citizen's Union, a non-partisan organization vetting candidates, described him as having a "uniformly bad record". In 1915, he was one of a handful of members to speak in favor of an ultimately unsuccessful bill which would have legalized the playing of baseball on Sundays.

Kerrigan lived for a time in a landmark two-story wooden house on Broadway, which he moved out of in March 1918, as the property had been sold and the building was to be wrecked.

== Sources ==
- Official New York from Cleveland to Hughes by Charles Elliott Fitch (Hurd Publishing Co., New York and Buffalo, 1911, Vol. IV; pg. 325f, 328 and 331)
- New York State Legislative Souvenir for 1893 with Portraits of the Members of Both Houses by Henry P. Phelps (pg. 43)

New York State Assembly
Preceded by William Dalton	New York State Assembly; New York County, 17th District; 1889–1891	Succeeded by Thomas J. McManus
Preceded by Thomas J. McManus	New York State Assembly; New York County, 17th District; 1893	Succeeded by Patrick F. Trainor
Preceded by John J. Boylan	New York State Assembly; New York County, 17th District; 1913–1915	Succeeded by James F. Mahony
