= Louis C. Ott =

American politician from New York

Louis C. Ott (August 1, 1855 – July 28, 1924) was an American politician from New York. He was elected to the New York State Assembly in 1891.

== Life ==
Ott was born in Brooklyn on August 1, 1855, to German immigrants. He attended local public schools and became a cigar manufacturer.

In 1885, he was appointed Deputy Internal Revenue Collector. He served this position until his appointment as Kings County Deputy Sheriff in 1890.

In 1891, Ott was elected to the New York State Assembly, representing the Kings County 7th District. He served in the Assembly in 1892 and 1893.

After he left the Assembly, Ott moved to Rockaway Beach, Queens, where he worked as a brewery agent and managed several hotels. He was elected to the Queens County Board of Supervisors, representing the Rockaways and Inwood, prior to the consolidation of New York City.

His wife's name was Louisa (1858-1917), and his children were Louis C., Jr., William, Andrew, Harry, Walter, Robert, Mrs. F. Reihl, and Mrs. Ernest H. Mejo.

Ott died on July 28, 1924, in his daughter's Lynbrook home. He was buried in the Lutheran All Faiths Cemetery.

New York State Assembly
Preceded by Adam Schaaff	New York State Assembly; Kings County, 7th District; 1892	Succeeded by Thomas F. Byrnes (politician)
Preceded by Charles A. Conrady	New York State Assembly; Kings County, 12th District; 1893	Succeeded by Joseph F. Loonan
