= William E. Wheeler =

American politician

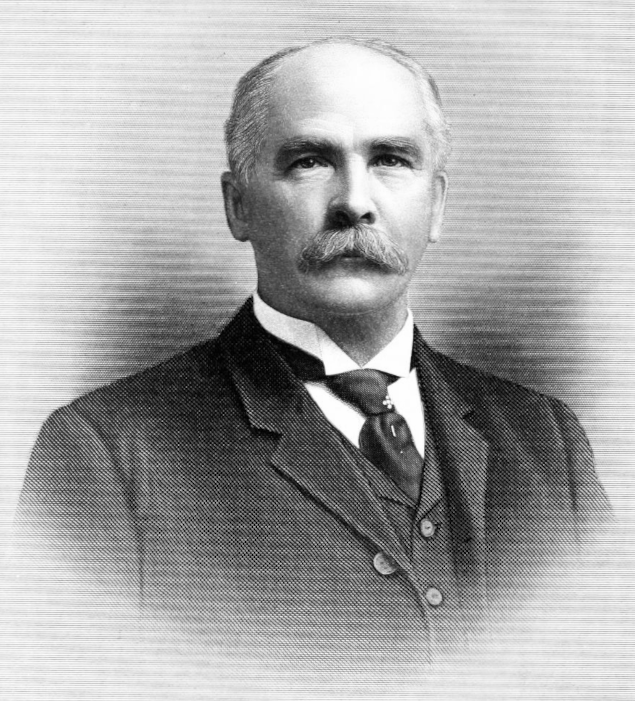

Member of the New York State Assembly
- In office 1892, 1893, 1900

Personal details
- Born: William Egbert Wheeler; November 21, 1843 Portville, New York, US
- Died: April 28, 1911 (aged 67) Portville, New York, US
- Party: Republican
- Parents: William F. Wheeler (father); Flora Atkins (mother)
- Relatives: Nelson Platt Wheeler (brother)
- Education: Yale University
- Occupation: Businessman, politician

William Egbert Wheeler (November 21, 1843 – April 28, 1911) was an American businessman and politician from New York.

== Life ==
Wheeler was born on November 21, 1843, in Mayville, New York. Mayville later became part of Portville. He was the son of William F. Wheeler and Flora Atkins. His brother was Nelson Platt Wheeler.

Wheeler graduated with honors from the Cortland Academy in Homer in 1863. He then entered Hamilton College, but after a year transferred to Yale University. He was a member of the Yale Varsity team and in 1866 participated in the Harvard–Yale Regatta. He was a member of Phi Beta Kappa and Sigma Phi. He graduated from Yale with a B.A. in 1866 and an M.A. in 1869.

After graduating from Yale, he worked with his father and brother in the lumber business. In 1870 he helped establish the Portville Tanning Company, serving as its manager. He was also a stockholder and president of the Chicago Lumbering Company and was a director of several other companies in Manistique, Michigan. After a visit to the Pacific Coast in 1900, he invested heavily in timber in the region, and served as president of the Lagoon Lumber Company, the Rogue River Timber Company, the Wheeler Timber Company, and the Manistique Lumber Company. He was also vice-president of the First National Bank of Olean, an incorporator and director of the Commonwealth Trust Company of Buffalo, and president of the Acme Milling Company of Olean.

Wheeler was elected town supervisor for six terms, and was a member of the school board. In 1891, he was elected to the New York State Assembly as a Republican, representing the Cattaraugus County 1st District. He served in the Assembly in 1892, 1893, and 1900.

In 1874, Wheeler married Allie E. Mersereau. Their children were William M., John Egbert, Eleanor Knox, and Laurence Raymond. He was an elder of the Portville Presbyterian church, and served as trustee and president of the Western New York Society for the Protection of Homeless and Dependent Children.

Wheeler died at home on April 28, 1911, from heart disease. He was buried in Chestnut Hill Cemetery.

New York State Assembly
Preceded by Burton B. Lewis	New York State Assembly; Cattaraugus County, 1st District; 1892	Succeeded by District Abolished
Preceded by District Created	New York State Assembly; Cattaraugus County; 1893	Succeeded by Charles W. Terry (New York)
Preceded by George A. Stoneman	New York State Assembly; Cattaraugus County, 1st District; 1900	Succeeded by Myron E. Fisher
