= William Emmet Shields =

American lawyer and politician

William Emmet Shields (June 6, 1861 – August 14, 1893) was an American lawyer and politician from New York.

== Life ==
William was born on June 6, 1861, in Brooklyn. His father Michael was Chief Clerk in the Second District Civil Court, and his mother Bridget was an Irish immigrant.

Studying law under Kings County District Attorney James W. Ridgway, William became a lawyer at the age of 21. In 1884, he served as attorney for Charles H. Rugg, an accused murderer from Queens.

In 1891, William was elected to the New York State Assembly, representing the Kings County 6th District. He served in the Assembly in 1890, 1891, 1892, and 1893.

William was a commander of the Oak council, American Legion of Honor.

On August 14, 1893, William died from colorectal cancer in New York Hospital, Manhattan. He was buried in Calvary Cemetery in Woodside, Queens.

New York State Assembly
| Preceded by Patrick H. McCarren | New York State Assembly; Kings County, 6th District; 1890-1892 | Succeeded by Patrick McGowan (Brooklyn) |
| Preceded by George L. Weed | New York State Assembly; Kings County, 11th District; 1893 | Succeeded by Henry Schulz |
