= Clarence W. Dexter =

American politician

- Born: April 23, 1848; Stockbridge, New York, U.S.
- Died: March 17, 1914 (aged 65); Oneida Castle, New York, U.S.
- Occupations: American businessman and politician

Clarence W. Dexter (April 23, 1848 – March 17, 1914) was an American businessman and politician from New York.

== Life ==
Dexter was born on April 23, 1848, in Stockbridge, New York, the son of William Dexter and Fanny T. Herrington. When he was 13 he was left to take care of his widowed mother and younger siblings.

When Dexter was 16, he began buying eggs and saving money. In 1870, he raised enough to enter the grocery business in Munnsville. Over time, he grew his business until he became proprietor of a chain of stores in Oriskany Falls, Deansboro, Solsville, and Chittenango. In 1889, he was briefly interested in manufacturing farm implements in Munnsville. He also purchased a farm in Stockbridge. He was a promoter and director of the Farmers' and Merchants' State Bank of Oneida, and was an organizer and president of the National Bank of Oriskany Falls. He served as postmaster at Munnsville for many years.

In 1891, Dexter was elected to the New York State Assembly as a Republican, representing Madison County. He served in the Assembly in 1892 and 1893.

Dexter was married to Emma Jobes. Their daughter was Emma C. Dickson.

In around 1909 Dexter moved to Oneida Castle. He died there from apoplexy on March 17, 1914. He was buried in Glenwood Cemetery.

New York State Assembly
Preceded by Samuel R. Mott	New York State Assembly; Madison County; 1892-1893	Succeeded by Lambert B. Kern
