= Daniel F. Martin =

American politician

Daniel F. Martin (February 1, 1865 – January 8, 1907) was an American lawyer, judge, and politician from New York.

== Life ==
Martin was born on February 1, 1865, in New York City to Irish immigrants. He attended the College of the City of New York.

Initially, Martin worked as a public school teacher. At one point, he was Professor of Mathematics at St. Francis Xavier College. While teaching, he began to study law. He attended Columbia Law School. After he was admitted to the bar, he became a clerk for United States Attorney Stephen A. Walker. He later opened a law office with assemblyman Wright Holcomb.

In 1890, he was elected to the New York State Assembly as a Democrat, representing the New York County 18th District. He served in the Assembly in 1891, 1892, and 1893. In 1893, he was elected Civil Justice of the 6th District. In 1899, he was elected Municipal Court Justice of the 6th District.

Martin died at home on 245 E. 33rd St. from pneumonia on January 8, 1907. He had a wife and three children.

New York State Assembly
Preceded by Stephen J. O'Hare	New York State Assembly; New York County, 18th District; 1891–1892	Succeeded by Thomas J. McManus
Preceded by William Sulzer	New York State Assembly; New York County, 14th District; 1893	Succeeded by John P. Corrigan
