= Morris Jacoby =

American politician

- Born: May 3, 1857; Schneidemuhl, Kingdom of Prussia
- Died: August 24, 1930 (aged 73); New York City, New York, U.S.
- Occupations: Real estate businessman Politician
- Years active: 1891–1920
- Political party: Democratic Party; National Democratic Party
- Spouse: Carrie Gross
- Children: Jeanne H. Jacoby; Stephen H. Jacoby
- Parent(s): Henry Jacoby; Bertha Michaels

Morris Jacoby (May 3, 1857 – August 24, 1930) was a German-American real estate businessman and politician.

== Life ==
Jacoby was born on May 3, 1857 in Schneidemuhl, Kingdom of Prussia, the son of Henry Jacoby and Bertha Michaels.

Jacoby immigrated to America in 1864 and went to New York City public schools. He worked as a real estate dealer, with an office at 145 Nassau Street. He was an official appraiser for New York City in condemnation proceedings, especially Division Street Park, Eleventh Ward Park, and the East River bridges. He was also secretary, manager, and director of Mount Zion Cemetery, director of the Caddo Asphalt Mining Company, and a founder and vice-president of the Hebrew Free Loan Association.

Jacoby was a clerk for the New York State Assembly Committee on Cities in 1891. In 1892, he was elected to the Assembly as a Democrat, representing the New York County 22nd District. He served in the Assembly in 1893. In the Assembly, he submitted bills that prohibited giving contracts to non-residents, punished people assuming the right to grant divorce, prohibited non-citizens from being employed in public works, and declared eight hours the work limit for city government employees.

Jacoby was involved in politics since he joined Tammany Hall when he was 21 and was leader of his assembly district for many years. In the 1896 presidential election, he split with the Democrats over the silver question and joined the Gold Democrats. He left politics afterwards. He remained active in real estate until 1920.

In 1892, Jacoby married Carrie Gross. Their children were Jeanne H. and Stephen H.

Jacoby died in Mount Sinai Hospital following an operation on August 24, 1930.

New York State Assembly
| Preceded by William J. O'Dair | New York State Assembly; New York County, 22nd District; 1893 | Succeeded by Michael F. Tobin |
