= Francis T. Miller =

American politician

Francis T. Miller (October 16, 1847 – September 18, 1917) was an American farmer and politician from New York.

== Life ==
Miller was born on October 16, 1847, in Byron, New York, the son of farmer Wheaton S. Miller and Emarett Southworth.

Miller attended the Albany Classical Institute, graduating from there in 1865. He managed a large farm from 1869 to 1885. He also worked in the coal business as a member of the firm Boynton, Prentice & Co. In 1884, he established a grain business with his brother Elisha H. called F. T. & E. H. Miller, which had grain elevators in Byron, South Byron, Bergen, Morganville, and Darien Center.

Miller was Assessor of Byron from 1870 to 1872 and town supervisor from 1879 to 1881. In 1889, he was elected to the New York State Assembly as a Republican, representing Genesee County. He served in the Assembly in 1890 and 1891.

In 1869, Miller married Julia A. Benham. Their children were Holden C., James D., Francis T. Jr., Marion, Mrs. E. L. McKelver, Imogene, Florence, and Annabel. Julia died in 1894, and by 1899 he married Ida Peckham. By the time he died, he was married to Julia Prentice. He was president of the Genesse County Agricultural Society and a member of the Odd Fellows.

Miller died at home on September 18, 1917. He was buried in Byron Cemetery.

New York State Assembly
Preceded by John M. McKenzie	New York State Assembly; Genesee County; 1890–1891	Succeeded by Charles N. Reed
