= Herman E. Buck =

American politician (1847–1916)

Herman Emerson Buck (May 14, 1847 – March 7, 1916) was an American businessman and politician from New York.

== Life ==
Buck was born on May 14, 1847, in Farmington, Washington County, Wisconsin Territory. His father was Benjamin F. Buck. Shortly after he was born, the family moved to Ridgebury Township, Pennsylvania.

At the age of 15, Buck enlisted in the 75th New York Volunteer Infantry, Company K, as a drummer boy to fight in the American Civil War. While serving in Louisiana, he contracted malarial fever and was in an army hospital for six months. He never fully recovered from the illness. He retained an interest in the Civil War, and kept one of the largest libraries on Civil War history in western New York.

Buck was discharged from military service with a surgeon's certificate of disability. In 1869, he moved to Hornellsville, New York, and worked for Joseph Harris, senior member of the dry goods dealer firm J. Harris & Sons. In 1870, he moved to Canisteo and worked for Wm. B. Taylor & Co. He later worked in the retail boot and shoe business. He also was involved in the Canisteo Fire Department. He served as clerk and trustee of the village of Canisteo, and was town supervisor for two terms.

In 1891, Buck was elected to the New York State Assembly as a Republican, representing the Steuben County 2nd District. He served in the Assembly in 1892 and 1893. While in the Assembly he introduced a bill to appropriate funds for the Hornell Armory. In 1896, he was the village president. In 1910, President Taft appointed him postmaster of Canisteo.

Buck was a freemason and a member of the Grand Army of the Republic. He married Elbertine Shuart of Pennsylvania in 1872. They had two children, Gertrude S. and William E. Elbertine died in 1903. Buck then married Anna Rice of Bath in 1906. He was an active member and elder of the Presbyterian church.

Buck died at home from cancer on March 7, 1916. He was buried in Hillside Cemetery.

New York State Assembly
| Preceded by Milo M. Acker | New York State Assembly; Steuben County, 2nd District; 1892-1893 | Succeeded by Merrit F. Smith |
