= Norton Chase =

American lawyer and politician

Norton Chase (September 3, 1861, Albany, New York – 1922) was an American lawyer and politician from the state of New York.

== Life and career ==
Norton Chase was the son of Nelson H. Chase. He graduated from The Albany Academy in 1878 and attended Yale College. He graduated from Albany Law School in 1882 and practiced law in Albany.

Chase was Assistant Corporation Counsel of the City of Albany for two years. A Democrat, he served in the New York State Assembly (Albany Co., 3rd D.) in 1886. On June 22, 1887, he married Mabel Louise James.

Chase ran for New York State Senate in 1887, but was defeated by Republican Henry Russell by an eight-vote margin. He ran again in 1889 and prevailed. Chase was a member of the New York State Senate (17th D.) in 1890 and 1891.

In the New York state election, 1895, Chase ran on the Democratic ticket for New York Attorney General, but was defeated by the incumbent Republican Theodore E. Hancock.

Chase died in 1922 and was buried at the Albany Rural Cemetery in Menands, New York.

New York State Assembly
Preceded by Patrick Murray	New York State Assembly; Albany County, 3rd District; 1886	Succeeded by William J. Hill
New York State Senate
Preceded by Henry Russell	New York State Senate; 17th District; 1890–1891	Succeeded by Amasa J. Parker, Jr.
