= James M. Riley (politician) =

American politician

Member of the New York House of Representatives from the 1st district
- In office 1890–1892
- Preceded by: George O'Neil (New York)
- Succeeded by: William M. Keenan

James M. Riley (April 11, 1854 – December 10, 1913) was an American politician from New York.

== Life ==
Riley was born on April 11, 1854, in Troy, New York. His parents were John Riley and Mary Higgins. After finishing public school, he worked in his father's pipe-covering business. The business later became the Troy Salamander Foundry Company, with Riley as its president and treasurer. He was elected alderman in 1886 and 1887 as a Democrat in what was considered a Republican stronghold.

In 1889, Riley was elected to the New York State Assembly, representing the Rensselaer County 1st District. He served in the Assembly in 1890, 1891, and 1892. While in the Assembly, he introduced a number of bills related to canals, including one for the improvement of the Hudson River, another for widening of the Champlain Canal, another for the dredging of the Erie basin, and another for the restoration of locks on the Black River Canal and Erie Canal. He also proposed several bills related to prison labor, including one to prohibit employing state prisons of more than 100 men from making collars and cuffs, one on the employment of convicts on roads, and one for the branding of goods made in state prisons as prison-made.

In 1899, Riley was appointed a member of the Municipal Service Civil Commission and was quickly chosen as its chairman. He was later appointed Secretary of the Board of Contract and Supply. He was a member of the Trojan Hook and Ladder Company since 1872, and a trustee of the Exempt Firemen's Association.

Riley died at home on December 10, 1913. He was buried in St. Agnes Cemetery in Albany.

New York State Assembly
Preceded by George O'Neil (New York)	New York State Assembly; Rensselaer County, 1st District; 1890-1892	Succeeded by William M. Keenan
