= Thomas F. Byrnes (politician) =

American politician (1859–1916)

Thomas F. Byrnes (May 2, 1859 – December 16, 1916) was an American politician from New York.

== Life ==
Thomas was born on May 2, 1859, in Brooklyn, New York. He was the son of Irish immigrants, Michael Byrnes and Margaret Quigley.

After graduating from public school, he became a horseshoer. Over time, he became shop foreman of the Brooklyn City Railroad Company, president of the Journeymen Horseshoers' National Union of the United States of America, a delegate to the Brooklyn Central Labor Union, and a delegate to the District Assembly No. 75, Knights of Labor.

A Democrat, he was elected in 1889 to the New York State Assembly, representing the Kings County 10th District. He served in the Assembly in 1890, 1891, 1892, and 1893

After he left the Assembly, Thomas worked as a contractor for several years, but remained active in local politics. He was appointed Deputy Commissioner of Water Supply, Gas, and Electricity in January 1904, and shortly after being removed from the position in May he was appointed Collector of City Revenue and Superintendent of Markets. In 1906, he was appointed real estate appraiser for the Finance Department. In 1911, New York governor John Alden Dix appointed him Tax Commissioner of New York. In December 1915, Thomas was made undersheriff, a position he held for the remainder of his life. Thomas also served as a delegate to the 1912 and 1916 Democratic National Conventions.

Thomas was married to Rose Gillen, and they had two daughters, Beatrice and Agnes. Thomas was a member of several organizations, including the Benevolent and Protective Order of Elks and the Montauk Club.

Thomas died at his Brooklyn home on December 16, 1916. He was buried in Holy Cross Cemetery.

New York State Assembly
| Preceded by John B. Longley | New York State Assembly; Kings County, 10th District; 1890-1892 | Succeeded by William E. Melody |
| Preceded by Louis C. Ott | New York State Assembly; Kings County, 7th District; 1893 | Succeeded by William Hughes |
