= Gilbert A. Deane =

American politician

Gilbert A. Deane (June 2, 1851 Chapinville, Litchfield County, Connecticut – November 20, 1891 Copake, Columbia County, New York) was an American politician from New York.

== Life ==
He attended Williamstown Seminary. Then he removed to Copake and worked at the Copake Iron Works owned by Frederick Miles. Deane married Minnie J. Andrews (1855–1932), and they had several children.

Deane was a Republican member of the New York State Assembly (Columbia Co.) in 1884.

He was a member of the New York State Senate (15th D.) from 1888 to 1891, sitting in the 111th, 112th, 113th and 114th New York State Legislatures. In November 1891, he ran for re-election but the State Board of State Canvassers (the Democratic state officers) declared his opponent Edward B. Osborne elected despite receiving fewer votes than Deane.

Deane died on November 20, 1891, less than three weeks after the election, at his home in Copake, from "congestion of the brain" attributed to "overexertion during the election campaign". He was buried at the Hillsdale Rural Cemetery in Hillsdale, New York.

== Sources ==
- The New York Red Book compiled by Edgar L. Murlin (published by James B. Lyon, Albany NY, 1897; pg. 403 and 503)
- Biographical sketches of the members of the Legislature in The Evening Journal Almanac (1888)
- OBITUARY; GILBERT A. DEANE in NYT on November 21, 1891

New York State Assembly
Preceded by Abram L. Schermerhorn	New York State Assembly; Columbia County; 1884	Succeeded by John C. Hogeboom
New York State Senate
Preceded by Jacob W. Hoysradt	New York State Senate; 15th District; 1888–1891	Succeeded by Edward B. Osborne
