= Michael J. Nolan =

American printer and politician

Michael J. Nolan (February 1, 1856 – December 24, 1902) was an American printer and politician from New York.

== Life ==
Nolan was born on February 1, 1856, in Albany, New York, the son of Patrick and Mary Nolan.

When he was 13, Nolan entered the printing office of Joel Munsell and began studying the printing trade. In 1877, he began working for the Argus Company as a compositor for the Argus. He was promoted to day foreman of the Argus compositing room in 1885, and then foreman of the book-room. In the latter position, he superintended the execution of the 1886 legislative printing. He was prominently involved with organized labor, belonging to the Albany Typographical Union. He was an organizer for the International Typographical Union, and he represented his union at two national conventions. He retired as a printer in 1893, and later became proprietor of a saloon.

In 1885, Nolan was elected town supervisor of the Albany 2nd Ward. He was re-elected the following year unopposed. In 1889, he was elected to the New York State Assembly as a Democrat, representing the Albany County 1st District. He served in the Assembly in 1890 and 1891.

Nolan was a member of the Elks. He had a wife, three daughters, and a son.

Nolan died on December 24, 1902.

New York State Assembly
Preceded by Jervis L. Miller	New York State Assembly; Albany County, 1st District; 1890–1891	Succeeded by Artcher La Grange
