= Galen R. Hitt =

American lawyer and politician

Galen R. Hitt (August 16, 1843 – March 11, 1897) was an American lawyer and politician from New York.

== Life ==
Hitt was born on August 16, 1843, in Pawlet, Vermont. In 1859 he entered Troy Conference Academy in Poultney, attending the school for the next four years.

Hitt began to study law in Rutland in the law office of Dewey & Joice. He was admitted to the Vermont bar. In 1865, he moved to Albany, New York, and was admitted to the New York bar. He worked as a prominent criminal lawyer in the state, serving as a defense for Bat Shea in the murder of Robert Ross. In 1874, he helped organize Albany's Boatman's Relief Association, serving as a director and its attorney. In 1877, he joined the Burgesses Corp and served as its president and vice-president. In 1884, he was elected an alderman from the sixth ward, and in 1888 he was elected as alderman-at-large.

In 1888, Hitt was elected to the New York State Assembly as a Democrat, representing the Albany County 3rd District. He served in the Assembly in 1889, 1890, 1891, and 1892.

In 1865, Hitt married Sarah J. Crowley of Mount Holly, Vermont. They had no children.

Hitt died in Round Lake on March 11, 1897. He was buried in Mountain View Cemetery in West Pawlet, Vermont.

New York State Assembly
Preceded by William J. Hill	New York State Assembly; Albany County, 3rd District; 1889-1892	Succeeded by Myer Nussbaum
