= Frank O. Chamberlain =

American farmer, hotel manager, and politician

Frank O. Chamberlain (April 2, 1829 – March 21, 1902) was an American farmer, hotel manager, and politician from New York.

== Life ==
Chamberlain was born on April 2, 1829, in Cohocton, New York. His father was a veteran of the War of 1812.

At the age of 15, Chamberlain left for Rushville, where he worked as a farmer. He later managed the Rushville mill and worked in the livery business. In 1852, he was appointed postmaster of Rushville, a position he held for the next eight years. In 1860, he became the manager of the Rushville hotel, where he worked until the outbreak of the Civil War.

Chamberlain enlisted in the 8th New York Volunteer Cavalry Regiment in September 1861. He participated in the retreat of General Banks and served as quartermaster with the rank of major. He resigned after a year due to ill health. He returned to Rushville, where he worked on a farm and livery for the next few years.

In 1862, he was elected Superintendent of the Poor of Yates County. He resigned from the position in 1865. He then moved to Canandaigua, where he spent the next ten years managing the Webster House, a prominent hotel in the area. He bought a farm on the western shore of Canandaigua Lake in 1873.

In 1869, Chamberlain was elected town supervisor of Canandaigua. In 1876, he was appointed postmaster of Canandaigua. In 1877, he was appointed Under Sheriff of Ontario County.

In 1890, Chamberlain was elected to the New York State Assembly as a Republican, representing Ontario County. He served in the Assembly in 1891 and 1892.

Chamberlain was a freemason and a Congregationalist. He served as president and treasurer of the Ontario County Agricultural Society, and was a trustee for the New York State Agricultural Society. He was the first president of the Canandaigua Street Railroad. In 1896, he was appointed trustee for the New York State Agricultural Experiment Station in Geneva, New York.

Charmberlain's first wife was Fear Yeackley. Their three sons were Oliver H., James H., and Frank D. After Fear died, he married Elizabeth H. Hulse.

Chamberlain died on March 21, 1902, at home. He was buried in the Woodlawn Cemetery in Canandaigua.

New York State Assembly
Preceded by Sanford W. Abbey	New York State Assembly; Ontario County; 1891-1892	Succeeded by William L. Parkhurst
