= William P. Richardson (New York politician) =

American politician (1848–1923)

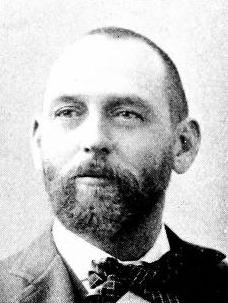
William P. Richardson (1893)

William Phineas Richardson (1848–1923) was an American politician from New York.

== Life ==
He was born May 10, 1848 Lawrence, Essex County, Massachusetts, as the son of Rev. John G. Richardson (1815–1890). The family removed to Newburyport, and then to Providence, Rhode Island. He attended the public schools, and then became a clerk in drug store, first in Providence, then in Paterson, New Jersey. In the latter place, he became later a clerk, and then a partner, in a hardware store, and also engaged in the feed business. Some time later he removed to a farm in Goshen, New York.

He was a presidential elector in 1888, voting for Benjamin Harrison and Levi P. Morton.

He was a member of the New York State Senate (13th D.) from 1890 to 1893, sitting in the 113th, 114th, 115th and 116th New York State Legislatures.

== Sources ==
- The New York Red Book compiled by Edgar L. Murlin (published by James B. Lyon, Albany NY, 1897; pg. 403f)
- OBITUARY NOTES; The Rev. John G. Richardson... in NYT on June 17, 1890
- Biographical sketches of the members of the Legislature in The Evening Journal Almanac (1892)
- New York State Legislative Souvenir for 1893 with Portraits of the Members of Both Houses by Henry P. Phelps (pg. 18)

New York State Senate
Preceded by Peter Ward	New York State Senate; 13th District; 1890–1893	Succeeded by Charles L. Guy
