= Charles N. Reed =

American politician

Charles Newton Reed (May 9, 1837 – March 25, 1926) was an American farmer and politician from New York.

== Life ==
Reed was born on May 9, 1837, in Clarendon, New York. His parents were assemblyman Horatio Reed and Jane Green. He moved to Bergen in 1845.

Reed attended Cary Academy and the Monroe Institute. He taught school in Trumansburg, and later worked as a farmer. He campaigned for John C. Frémont in the 1856 presidential election, served on the Genesee County Republican Committee, and was a captain of the Wide Awakes. He was also a Sunday school superintendent, and served as town supervisor of Bergen.

In 1891, Reed was elected to the New York State Assembly as a Republican, representing Genesee County. He served in the Assembly in 1892 and 1893.

In 1860, Reed married Charlotte A. Griffin. They had two sons, Herbert Griffin and Charles Louise.

In his later years, Reed largely lived in Rochester, but returned to Bergen in the winter. He died in his Bergen home on March 25, 1926. He was buried in the Rest Cemetery in Bergen.

New York State Assembly
Preceded by Francis T. Miller	New York State Assembly; Genesee County; 1892-1893	Succeeded by Thomas B. Tuttle
