= Henry J. Lane =

American politician

Henry J. Lane (February 27, 1841 – October 2, 1915) was an American merchant and politician from New York.

== Life ==
Lane was born on February 27, 1841, in Sackets Harbor, New York, the son of English immigrants Charles Lane and Frances Hallyard.

Lane began teaching when he was 17, and continued doing so from 1858 to 1862. He then worked as a merchant in Sackets Harbor. He was elected town clerk of Hounsfield when he was 21, holding that office for three years. He also served as justice of the peace for two years, town assessor for three years, village president for six years, and town supervisor of Hounsfield from 1885 to 1888. He was also director of the Carthage, Watertown and Sackets Harbor Railroad.

In 1888, Lane was elected to the New York State Assembly as a Republican, representing the Jefferson County 1st District. He served in the Assembly in 1889, 1890, and 1891.

Lane was a member of the Freemasons. In 1862, he married Rosalthea S. Payne. Their three surviving children were Hubert H., Mrs. Rose F. Potter, and Dr. Arthur Garfield. Rosalthea died in around 1900, and a few years before his death Lane married Addie Parker.

Lane was blinded from cataracts in the last few years of his life, and due to financial difficulties he was forced to bankruptcy, which lead him to live the last year of his life in his daughter's home in East Rochester. He died there on October 2, 1915. He was buried in the family plot in Sackets Harbor cemetery.

New York State Assembly
Preceded by Anson S. Thompson	New York State Assembly; Jefferson County, 1st District; 1889–1891	Succeeded by Harrison Fuller
