= George L. Weed =

American politician (1857–1916)

George Leonard Weed (February 7, 1857 – December 2, 1916) was an American politician from New York.

== Life ==
George was born on February 7, 1857, in Brooklyn. His parents were William H. Weed and Maria Louise Fisher.

He went to Brooklyn Collegiate and Polytechnic Institute (today the New York University Tandon School of Engineering). Afterwards, he studied law under Horatio C. King and worked at Weed and Becker Manufacturing Company, which made tools and axes. He was a member of a number of fraternal orders, including the Freemasons (where he was a 32nd degree Scottish Rite), the Knights Templar, the Knights of the Mystic Shrine, the Royal Arcanum, the American Legion of Honor, the National Provident Union, and the Order of the Golden Chain.

George, active in local Republican politics, was elected to the New York State Assembly in 1889, representing the Kings County 11th District. He served in the Assembly in 1890 and, after a year away from the Assembly, in 1892.

George was ill for the last 12 years of his life, and he died on December 2, 1916, in Brooklyn. He was buried in Cypress Hills Cemetery.

New York State Assembly
Preceded by Joseph Aspinall	New York State Assembly; Kings County, 11th District; 1890	Succeeded by Joseph Aspinall
Preceded by Joseph Aspinall	New York State Assembly; Kings County, 11th District; 1892	Succeeded by William Emmet Shields
