= Otto Kempner =

American politician (1858-1914)

Otto Kempner (July 5, 1858 – October 8, 1914) was a Jewish-American lawyer, politician, and judge from New York.

== Life ==
Kempner was born on July 5, 1858 in Tokaj, Kingdom of Hungary. He immigrated to America with his parents in about 1868. He attended public school and the Cooper Union. He became a teacher of the German Free School of New York in 1883, and later became principal of the school. At one point, he worked as a clerk and bookkeeper for Henry Fliegenheimer, a former assemblyman in the liquor business.

Kempner was involved in politics from a very young age. When he was 17, he spoke on the stump for Samuel Tilden's 1876 presidential campaign. Four years later he published and edited the "Student and Statesman," a paper devoted to politics and encouraging young people to be more involved in politics. In 1892, he was elected to the New York State Assembly as a Democrat, representing the New York County 7th District. He served in the Assembly in 1893 and 1896. He quickly gained a reputation for his opposition to Tammany Hall, starting with a speech at the opening of the legislature that attacked the election of Edward Murphy Jr. to the United States Senate. In 1893, he published a pamphlet on Tammany leader Boss Crocker called Boss Crocker's Career, which contributed to Crocker's eventual downfall.

In 1894, the Committee of Seventy nominated him to be the Fusion candidate for Sheriff of New York County, but he declined the nomination. He did play a critical role in the Fusion campaign in 1901, and helped get Seth Low nominated candidate for mayor of New York City.

Kempner later studied law at New York Law School and was admitted to the bar. In 1898, he moved to Brooklyn. In 1901, he was appointed Assistant Commissioner of Public Works. In 1910, he was appointed Chief City Magistrate of the Magistrates' Courts of the Second Division of the City of New York.

Kempner's wife's name was Sarah. Their children were Clarence B., Henry, and Alma Kleiner. He was a member of the Freemasons and the Royal Arcanum. He was a trustee of Temple Israel.

Kempner died at home from cancer on October 8, 1914. He was buried in Mount Neboh Cemetery.

New York State Assembly
Preceded by Alfred R. Conkling	New York State Assembly; New York County, 7th District; 1893	Succeeded by John C. Stein
Preceded by Jacob Kunzenman	New York State Assembly; New York County, 10th District; 1896	Succeeded by Jeremiah J. Sullivan
