= James H. Pierson =

American politician

James Henry Pierson (May 26, 1838 – March 28, 1914) was an American politician from New York.

== Life ==
James H. Pierson was born on May 26, 1838, in Southampton, New York, the son of Philetus Pierson and Elizabeth Reeves. His ancestor was Henry Pierson, who immigrated to Southampton in 1640 to join his brother Abraham Pierson. Pierson's father Philetus was a whaling captain.

As a young man, Pierson served as Southampton's highway commissioner, assessor, tax collector, and inspector of elections. In 1881, he was elected as a Republican to be Southampton's town supervisor. He served as supervisor until 1902.

In 1889, Pierson was elected to the New York State Assembly, representing Suffolk County. He served in the Assembly in 1890, 1891, and 1892.

Pierson never married. He was the first president of the Southampton Bank, president of the Sag Harbor Savings Bank, president of the Southampton Water Works Company, and one of the founders and president of the Southampton Cemetery Association.

Pierson died in his Southampton home on March 28, 1914. He was buried in Southampton's North End Cemetery.

New York State Assembly
Preceded by Henry E. Huntting	New York State Assembly; Suffolk County; 1890-1892	Succeeded by Richard Higbie
