= Charles Clinton Adams =

American politician

Charles Clinton Adams (October 11, 1833 – March 15, 1906) was an American merchant and politician from New York.

== Life ==
Adams was born on October 11, 1833, in Sennett, New York, the son of Robert G. Adams. His grandfather, Captain Jonathan Adams, was a drummer boy in the American Revolutionary War.

When he was young, Adams moved to Weedsport, where he clerked in the community store. He later became the senior partner of the firm C. C. Adams & Sons, which dealt in grain, produce, and coal. In 1860, he was appointed postmaster of Weedsport. In 1865, he was appointed revenue collector for the northern district of Cayuga County. He served as town supervisor for Brutus from 1887 to 1890, and was chairman of the board of supervisors in 1890.

In 1891, Adams was elected to the New York State Assembly as a Republican, representing the Cayuga County 1st District. He served in the Assembly in 1892 and 1893.

Adams was married. He had two sons, Charles M. and Willard G. He was a freemason since 1859 and was a member of the Royal Arch Masonry. He served as a ruling elder of the local Presbyterian church.

Adams died at home from a stroke on March 15, 1906. He was buried in Weedsport Rural Cemetery.

New York State Assembly
Preceded by George W. Dickinson	New York State Assembly; Cayuga County, 1st District; 1892	Succeeded by District Abolished
Preceded by District Created	New York State Assembly; Cayuga County; 1893	Succeeded by Benjamin M. Wilcox
