= William E. Melody =

American politician

William Edward Melody (January 13, 1850 – May 15, 1916) was an American politician from New York.

== Life ==
Melody was born on the West Side of Manhattan, New York City on January 13, 1850. His parents were Matthew Melody and Sabina O'Connor, Irish immigrants. When he was six months old, he moved with his parents to Tivoli, New York. Six years later, the family moved to Cincinnati, Ohio. After six months there, the family moved to Williamsburg, Brooklyn, where Melody lived ever since.

After finished school, Melody became a successful real estate dealer. In 1892, he was elected to the New York State Assembly as a Democrat, representing the Kings County 10th District. He served in the Assembly in 1893 and 1894. In 1900, he was appointed commissioner of jurors for Kings County. In 1902, he was elected Sheriff of Kings County, and served as sheriff in 1903. In 1906, he was appointed deputy collector of arrears. In 1908, he was appointed commissioner of public works.

Melody married Henrietta Hinck in 1896. They had a daughter, Dorothy. He was a member of the Benevolent and Protective Order of Elks.

Melody died in Bushwick Hospital on May 15, 1916, from intestinal trouble. He was buried in the Lutheran All Faiths Cemetery; although Melody was a Roman Catholic, his wife was a Lutheran.

New York State Assembly
Preceded by Thomas F. Byrnes (politician)	New York State Assembly; Kings County, 10th District; 1893	Succeeded by Frank F. Schulz
Preceded by John Kelly (Brooklyn politician)	New York State Assembly; Kings County, 9th District; 1894	Succeeded by Thomas H. Bockwell
