= Milo M. Acker =

American lawyer and politician

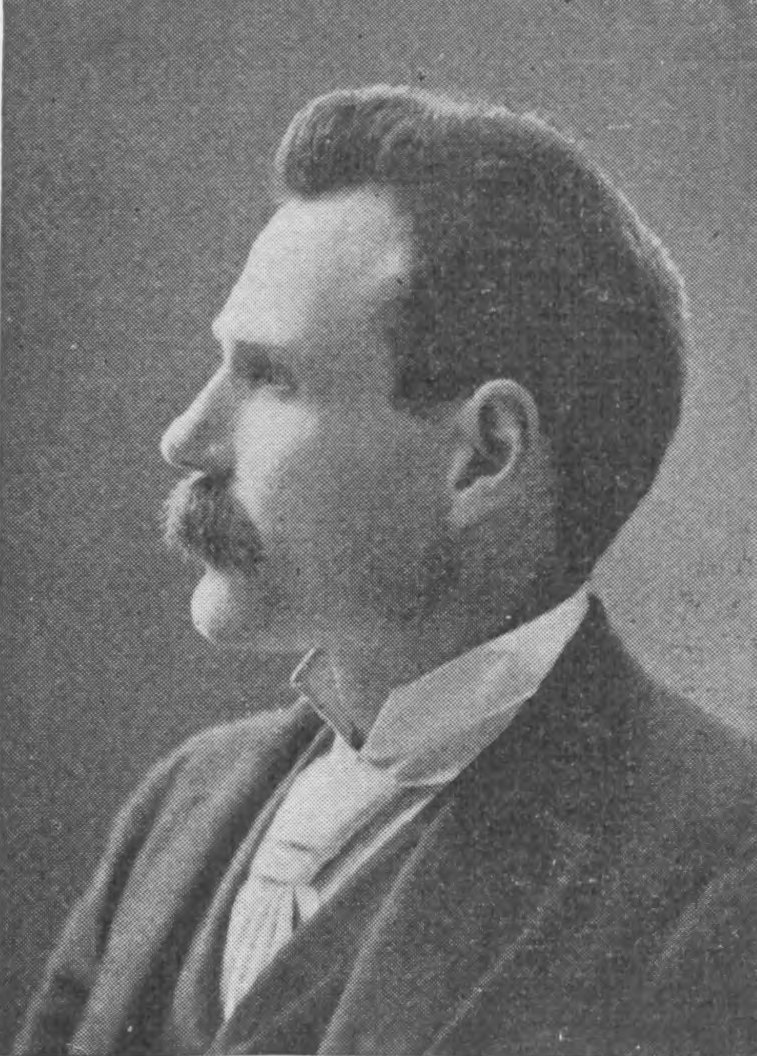
- Born: 3 October 1853; Hartsville
- Died: 11 August 1922; Rochester
- Occupations: Politician, lawyer
- Political party: Republican Party

Milo M. Acker (October 3, 1853 – August 11, 1922) was an American lawyer and politician from New York.

== Life ==
He was born on October 3, 1853, in Hartsville, Steuben County, New York, the son of Hugh J. Acker and Huldah (Call) Acker. He attended the public schools and Alfred University. He worked as a farmhand and a lumberjack, and later became a farmer. He was Supervisor of the Town of Hartsville in 1879 and 1880. Then he studied law, was admitted to the bar in 1883, and practiced law in Hornellsville. He was Police Justice of Hornellsville in 1885 and Recorder of Hornellsville in 1886.

Acker was a member of the New York State Assembly (Steuben Co., 2nd D.) in 1888, 1889, 1890 and 1891; and was Chairman of the Committee on the Judiciary in 1890. On October 9, 1890, he married Mary Wilder Clarke (1857–1937). He was Minority Leader of the Assembly in 1891. He was a delegate to the New York State Constitutional Convention of 1894.

He was a member of the New York State Water Supply Commission from 1905 to 1911. He was a delegate to the 1908 Republican National Convention.

He died on August 11, 1922, in Highland Hospital in Rochester, New York and was buried at the Rural Cemetery in Hornell.

== Sources ==
New York State Assembly
Preceded by Charles D. Baker	New York State Assembly; Steuben County, 2nd District; 1888–1891	Succeeded by Herman E. Buck
Political offices
Preceded by William F. Sheehan	Minority Leader in the New York State Assembly; 1891	Succeeded by James W. Husted
