= Joseph Aspinall =

American politician

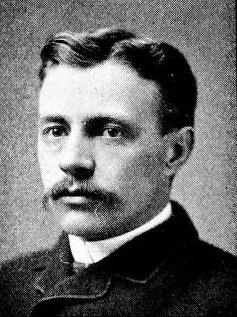
- Aspinall as state senator in 1893

Member of the New York Senate from the 3rd district
- In office 1892–1893

Member of the New York State Assembly for Kings County, 11th District
- In office: 1891; 1888–1889

Personal details
- Born: 1854 Brooklyn, Kings County, New York
- Died: May 7, 1939 (aged 84–85) Brooklyn, New York City

Joseph Aspinall (1854 – May 7, 1939) was an American lawyer and politician from New York.

== Life ==
He graduated from Columbia Law School in 1875. He was admitted to the bar, and practiced in Brooklyn.

He was a member of the New York State Assembly (Kings Co., 11th D.) in 1888, 1889 and 1891.

He was a member of the New York State Senate (3rd D.) in 1892 and 1893.

He was a Kings County Judge from 1896 to 1906; and a justice of the New York Supreme Court (2nd D.) from 1907 to 1924.

He died on May 7, 1939, at the Bushwick Hospital in Brooklyn.

== Sources ==
- The New York Red Book compiled by Edgar L. Murlin (published by James B. Lyon, Albany NY, 1897; pg. 404 and 506ff)
- New York State Legislative Souvenir for 1893 with Portraits of the Members of Both Houses by Henry P. Phelps (pg. 8) [with portrait]
- Biographical sketches of the members of the Legislature in The Evening Journal Almanac (1892)
- KINGS COUNTY'S JUDGES-ELECT in NYT on December 10, 1895
- JOSEPH ASPINALL, EX-JUSTICE, DEAD in NYT on May 9, 1939 (subscription required)

New York State Assembly
Preceded by James P. Graham	New York State Assembly; Kings County, 11th District; 1888–1889	Succeeded by George L. Weed
Preceded by George L. Weed	New York State Assembly; Kings County, 11th District; 1891	Succeeded by George L. Weed
New York State Senate
Preceded by James W. Birkett	New York State Senate; 3rd District; 1892–1893	Succeeded by William H. Reynolds
