= Myer Nussbaum =

American politician

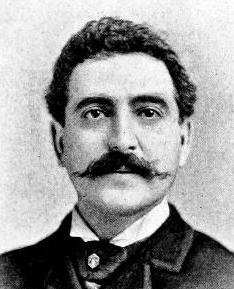
Myer Nussbaum (1893)

Myer Nussbaum (March 10, 1855, in Albany, New York – September 23, 1952, in New York City) was an American lawyer and politician from New York.

== Life ==
He was the son of Solomon Nussbaum (1806–1879) and Clara Nussbaum (1816–1898), German Jewish emigrants from Neustadt an der Saale. He attended the public schools. He graduated from Albany Law School in 1877, was admitted to the bar, and practiced in Albany. In 1884, he was appointed as a police justice. He married Lillian Van Kuren. The marriage ended in divorce before 1902.

He was a member of the New York State Assembly (Albany Co., 3rd D.) in 1893; and a member of the New York State Senate (29th D.) from 1896 to 1898, sitting in the 119th, 120th and 121st New York State Legislatures.

On May 28, 1900, he was appointed as referee to hear testimony relating to the business of the American Ice Company, an ice trust which the State authorities wanted to break up. Afterwards he remained in New York City, and practiced law there.

On February 13, 1915, he was appointed as referee to hear testimony to "determine whether the increased prices of bread, flour and wheat have been due to criminal conspiracy."

He was buried at the Beth Emeth Cemetery in Glenmont.

== Sources ==
- The New York Red Book compiled by Edgar L. Murlin (published by James B. Lyon, Albany NY, 1897; pg. 164f, 404 and 510)
- New York State Legislative Souvenir for 1893 with Portraits of the Members of Both Houses by Henry P. Phelps (pg. 47 and 49)
- STATE WAR ON ICE TRUST in NYT on May 29, 1900
- ALIMONY FOR MRS. WILSON in NYT on March 23, 1907
- STATE TO EXPOSE BREAD CONSPIRACY on February 14, 1915
- NUSSBAUM, MYER in the Jewish Encyclopedia

New York State Assembly
Preceded by Galen R. Hitt	New York State Assembly; Albany County, 3rd District; 1893	Succeeded by James Brennan
New York State Senate
Preceded by Cuthbert W. Pound	New York State Senate; 29th District; 1896–1898	Succeeded by Curtis N. Douglas
