= 113th New York State Legislature =

New York state legislative session

←	112th	114th	→
- New York State Capitol (2009)

Overview
- Legislative body: New York State Legislature
- Jurisdiction: New York, United States
- Term: January 1 – December 31, 1890

Senate
- Members: 32
- President: Lt. Gov. Edward F. Jones (D)
- Temporary President: Jacob Sloat Fassett (R)
- Party control: Republican (19-13)

Assembly
- Members: 128
- Speaker: James W. Husted (R)
- Party control: Republican (71-57)

Sessions
- 1st: January 7 – May 9, 1890

The 113th New York State Legislature, consisting of the New York State Senate and the New York State Assembly, met from January 7 to May 9, 1890, during the sixth year of David B. Hill's governorship, in Albany.

== Background ==
Under the provisions of the New York Constitution of 1846, 32 Senators and 128 assemblymen were elected in single-seat districts; senators for a two-year term, assemblymen for a one-year term. The senatorial districts were made up of entire counties, except New York County (seven districts) and Kings County (three districts). The Assembly districts were made up of entire towns, or city wards, forming a contiguous area, all within the same county.

At this time there were two major political parties: the Democratic Party and the Republican Party. In New York City, the Democrats were split into two factions: Tammany Hall and the "County Democracy". The Prohibition Party and the Greenback Party also nominated state tickets.

== Elections ==
The 1889 New York state election was held on November 5. All six statewide elective office up for election was carried by the Democrats. The approximate party strength at this election, as expressed by the vote for Secretary of State, was: Democrats 506,000; Republicans 485,000; Prohibition 27,000; and Greenback 1,000.

== Sessions ==
The Legislature met for the regular session at the State Capitol in Albany on January 7, 1890; and adjourned on May 9.

James W. Husted (R) was again elected Speaker, against William F. Sheehan (D).

Jacob Sloat Fassett (R) was re-elected President pro tempore of the State Senate.

== State Senate ==
=== Districts ===
- 1st District: Queens and Suffolk counties
- 2nd District: 1st, 2nd, 5th, 6th, 8th, 9th, 10th, 12th and 22nd Ward of the City of Brooklyn, and the towns of Flatbush, Gravesend and New Utrecht in Kings County
- 3rd District: 3rd, 4th, 7th, 11th, 13th, 19th, 20th, 21st and 23rd Ward of the City of Brooklyn
- 4th District: 14th, 15th, 16th, 17th, 18th, 24th and 25th Ward of the City of Brooklyn, and the towns of New Lots and Flatlands in Kings County
- 5th District: Richmond County and the 1st, 2nd, 3rd, 5th, 6th, 8th, 14th and parts of the 4th and 9th Ward of New York City
- 6th District: 7th, 11th, 13th and part of the 4th Ward of NYC
- 7th District: 10th, 17th and part of the 15th, 18th and 21st Ward of NYC
- 8th District: 16th and part of the 9th, 15th, 18th, 20th and 21st Ward of NYC
- 9th District: Part of the 18th, 19th and 21st Ward of NYC
- 10th District: Part of the 12th, 19th, 20th, 21st and 22nd Ward of NYC
- 11th District: 23rd and 24th, and part of the 12th, 20th and 22nd Ward of NYC
- 12th District: Rockland and Westchester counties
- 13th District: Orange and Sullivan counties
- 14th District: Greene, Schoharie and Ulster counties
- 15th District: Columbia, Dutchess and Putnam counties
- 16th District: Rensselaer and Washington counties
- 17th District: Albany County
- 18th District: Fulton, Hamilton, Montgomery, Saratoga and Schenectady counties
- 19th District: Clinton, Essex and Warren counties
- 20th District: Franklin, Lewis and St. Lawrence counties
- 21st District: Oswego and Jefferson counties
- 22nd District: Oneida County
- 23rd District: Herkimer, Madison and Otsego counties
- 24th District: Chenango, Delaware and Broome counties
- 25th District: Onondaga and Cortland counties
- 26th District: Cayuga, Seneca, Tompkins and Tioga counties
- 27th District: Allegany, Chemung and Steuben counties
- 28th District: Ontario, Schuyler, Wayne and Yates counties
- 29th District: Monroe and Orleans counties
- 30th District: Genesee, Livingston, Niagara and Wyoming counties
- 31st District: Erie County
- 32nd District: Cattaraugus and Chautauqua counties

Note: There are now 62 counties in the State of New York. The counties which are not mentioned in this list had not yet been established, or sufficiently organized, the area being included in one or more of the abovementioned counties.

=== Members ===
The asterisk (*) denotes members of the previous Legislature who continued in office as members of this Legislature. Patrick H. McCarren, George F. Roesch, Harvey J. Donaldson, Charles T. Saxton and Greenleaf S. Van Gorder changed from the Assembly to the Senate.

District	Senator	Party	Notes
1st	Edward Hawkins	Democrat	
2nd	John C. Jacobs	Democrat	
3rd	James W. Birkett	Republican	
4th	Patrick H. McCarren*	Democrat	
5th	William L. Brown	Tammany Dem.	
6th	John F. Ahearn	County Dem.	
7th	George F. Roesch*	Tammany Dem.	
8th	Lispenard Stewart	Republican	
9th	Charles A. Stadler*	Tammany Dem.	re-elected
10th	Jacob A. Cantor*	Tammany Dem.	re-elected
11th	Eugene S. Ives*	Tammany Dem.	re-elected
12th	William H. Robertson*	Republican	re-elected
13th	William P. Richardson	Republican	
14th	John J. Linson*	Democrat	re-elected
15th	Gilbert A. Deane*	Republican	re-elected
16th	Michael F. Collins*	Democrat	re-elected; contested by James C. Rogers (R)
17th	Norton Chase	Democrat	contested by George H. Treadwell (R)
18th	Harvey J. Donaldson*	Republican	
19th	Louis W. Emerson	Republican	
20th	George Z. Erwin*	Republican	re-elected
21st	George B. Sloan*	Republican	re-elected
22nd	Henry J. Coggeshall*	Republican	re-elected
23rd	Titus Sheard	Republican	
24th	Edmund O'Connor	Republican	
25th	Francis Hendricks*	Republican	re-elected
26th	Thomas Hunter	Republican	
27th	J. Sloat Fassett*	Republican	re-elected; re-elected President pro tempore
28th	Charles T. Saxton*	Republican	
29th	Donald McNaughton*	Democrat	re-elected
30th	Greenleaf S. Van Gorder*	Republican	
31st	John Laughlin*	Republican	re-elected
32nd	Commodore P. Vedder*	Republican	re-elected

=== Employees ===
- Clerk: John S. Kenyon
- Sergeant-at-Arms: Charles V. Schram
- Doorkeeper: Edward R. Gibbons
- Stenographer: George H. Thornton

== State Assembly ==
=== Assemblymen ===
The asterisk (*) denotes members of the previous Legislature who continued as members of this Legislature.

District		Assemblymen	Party	Notes
Albany	1st	Michael J. Nolan	Democrat	
Albany	2nd	William B. Page	Republican	
Albany	3rd	Galen R. Hitt*	Democrat	
Albany	4th	Michael C. Gillice	Democrat	contested; seat vacated
Albany	4th	William Burton LeRoy	Republican	seated on April 15
Allegany		Addison S. Thompson	Republican	
Broome		Israel T. Deyo	Republican	
Cattaraugus	1st	Burton B. Lewis	Republican	
Cattaraugus	2nd	James S. Whipple*	Republican	
Cayuga	1st	George W. Dickinson	Republican	
Cayuga	2nd	Leander Fitts*	Republican	
Chautauqua	1st	S. Frederick Nixon*	Republican	
Chautauqua	2nd	George E. Towne*	Republican	
Chemung		Robert P. Bush*	Democrat	
Chenango		Edgar A. Pearsall*	Republican	
Clinton		Alfred Guibord	Republican	
Columbia		Aaron B. Gardenier	Republican	
Cortland		Rufus T. Peck*	Republican	
Delaware		James Ballantine	Republican	
Dutchess	1st	Willard H. Mase*	Republican	
Dutchess	2nd	Johnston de Peyster*	Republican	
Erie	1st	William F. Sheehan*	Democrat	Minority Leader
Erie	2nd	Matthias Endres*	Democrat	
Erie	3rd	Leroy Andrus*	Republican	
Erie	4th	Henry H. Guenther*	Democrat	
Erie	5th	William B. Currier	Republican	
Essex		Thomas J. Treadway*	Republican	
Franklin		William C. Stevens*	Republican	
Fulton and Hamilton		John Christie	Republican	
Genesee		Francis T. Miller	Republican	
Greene		Omar V. Sage	Democrat	
Herkimer		John D. Henderson	Democrat	
Jefferson	1st	Henry J. Lane*	Republican	
Jefferson	2nd	Isaac Mitchell	Republican	
Kings	1st	Hugh A. McTernan	Democrat	
Kings	2nd	Bernard J. McBride	Democrat	
Kings	3rd	John Cooney	Democrat	
Kings	4th	John J. O'Connor	Democrat	
Kings	5th	John Kelly*	Democrat	
Kings	6th	William E. Shields	Democrat	
Kings	7th	Adam Schaaff*	Democrat	
Kings	8th	William Blanchfield*	Democrat	
Kings	9th	George Gretsinger	Republican	
Kings	10th	Thomas F. Byrnes	Democrat	
Kings	11th	George L. Weed	Republican	
Kings	12th	Charles J. Kurth	Republican	
Lewis		LeRoy Crawford	Republican	
Livingston		Elias H. Davis	Republican	
Madison		Samuel R. Mott	Republican	
Monroe	1st	Frank M. Jones	Republican	
Monroe	2nd	(P. Andrew Sullivan)	Democrat	did not take his seat; death announced on January 15
Monroe	2nd	Robert Courtney	Democrat	elected February 17 to fill vacancy; seated on February 26
Monroe	3rd	Edwin A. Loder*	Republican	died on June 5, 1890
Montgomery		John Knox Stewart	Republican	
New York	1st	Patrick H. Duffy*	Tammany Dem.	
New York	2nd	Timothy D. Sullivan*	Tammany Dem.	
New York	3rd	James A. Monaghan	County Dem.	
New York	4th	Thomas Brady	County Dem.	
New York	5th	Dominick F. Mullaney*	Tammany Dem.	
New York	6th	Gustav Menninger	County Dem.	
New York	7th	Francis V. King*	Republican	
New York	8th	Philip Wissig	County Dem.	
New York	9th	John Martin*	Democrat	
New York	10th	William Sohmer	Tammany Dem.	
New York	11th	William N. Hoag	Republican	
New York	12th	Moses Dinkelspiel*	County Dem./Rep.	
New York	13th	Frederick S. Gibbs*	Republican	
New York	14th	William Sulzer	Tammany Dem.	
New York	15th	Frederick Haffner*	Tammany Dem.	
New York	16th	Walter G. Byrne	Tammany Dem.	
New York	17th	John Kerrigan*	Democrat	
New York	18th	Stephen J. O'Hare	Tammany Dem.	
New York	19th	John Connelly*	Tammany Dem.	
New York	20th	Myer J. Stein	Tammany Dem.	
New York	21st	Richard J. Lewis	Republican	
New York	22nd	Joseph Blumenthal*	Tammany Dem.	
New York	23rd	George P. Webster	Tammany Dem.	
New York	24th	Christopher C. Clarke*	Tammany Dem.	
Niagara	1st	Ruthven Kill	Democrat	
Niagara	2nd	J. Marville Harwood*	Democrat	
Oneida	1st	James K. O'Connor	Republican	
Oneida	2nd	James L. Dempsey	Democrat	
Oneida	3rd	Russell S. Johnson	Republican	
Onondaga	1st	Howard G. White	Republican	
Onondaga	2nd	Willis B. Burns	Republican	
Onondaga	3rd	Ignatius Sawmiller	Republican	
Ontario		Sanford W. Abbey	Democrat	
Orange	1st	John C. Adams*	Republican	
Orange	2nd	George W. Greene*	Democrat	
Orleans		Wallace L'Hommedieu	Republican	
Oswego	1st	Nevada N. Stranahan	Republican	
Oswego	2nd	Wilbur H. Selleck	Republican	
Otsego	1st	Oscar F. Lane	Democrat	
Otsego	2nd	Nathan Bridges	Republican	
Putnam		Hamilton Fish II*	Republican	
Queens	1st	Solomon S. Townsend*	Democrat	
Queens	2nd	Henry C. Johnson	Republican	
Rensselaer	1st	James M. Riley	Democrat	
Rensselaer	2nd	Joseph S. Saunders*	Republican	
Rensselaer	3rd	John W. McKnight	Democrat	contested by James S. Rowley (R)
Richmond		Daniel T. Cornell	Democrat	
Rockland		Arthur S. Tompkins	Republican	
St. Lawrence	1st	N. Martin Curtis*	Republican	
St. Lawrence	2nd	William H. Kimball*	Republican	
St. Lawrence	3rd	William Bradford	Republican	
Saratoga	1st	Cornelius R. Sheffer	Republican	
Saratoga	2nd	Frank M. Boyce	Democrat	
Schenectady		George W. Van Vranken	Democrat	
Schoharie		Alonzo B. Coons	Democrat	
Schuyler		Charles T. Willis	Republican	
Seneca		John H. Stevens	Democrat	
Steuben	1st	Peter B. Pealer	Democrat	
Steuben	2nd	Milo M. Acker*	Republican	Chairman of Judiciary
Suffolk		James H. Pierson	Republican	
Sullivan		William R. Rose	Republican	
Tioga		Abram I. Decker*	Republican	
Tompkins		Nelson Stevens	Republican	
Ulster	1st	James H. Everett	Republican	
Ulster	2nd	Jacob Rice*	Democrat	
Ulster	3rd	George H. Bush*	Democrat	
Warren		Scott Barton*	Republican	
Washington	1st	Charles W. Larmon*	Republican	
Washington	2nd	Albert Johnson	Republican	
Wayne	1st	John P. Bennett	Republican	
Wayne	2nd	Richard P. Groat*	Republican	
Westchester	1st	J. Irving Burns	Republican	
Westchester	2nd	Bradford Rhodes*	Republican	
Westchester	3rd	James W. Husted*	Republican	elected Speaker
Wyoming		I. Sam Johnson	Republican	
Yates		Calvin J. Huson	Democrat	

=== Employees ===
- Clerk: Charles A. Chickering
- Sergeant-at-Arms: James H. Manville
- Doorkeeper: Homer B. Webb
- Stenographer: Isaac H. Smith

== Sources ==
- The New York Red Book compiled by Edgar L. Murlin (published by James B. Lyon, Albany NY, 1897; see pg. 384f for senate districts; pg. 403 for senators; pg. 410–417 for Assembly districts; and pg. 507f for assemblymen)
- Biographical sketches of the members of the Legislature in The Evening Journal Almanac (1890)
