= John Laughlin (New York politician) =

American politician

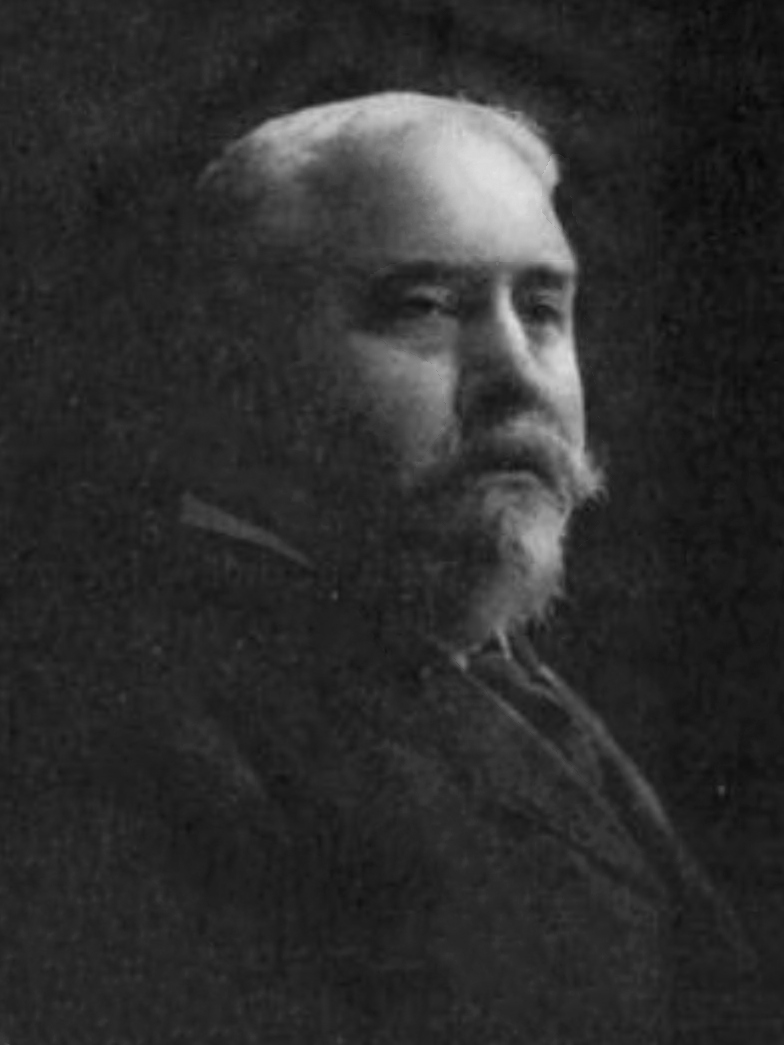

Member of the New York State Senate
- In office 1888–1891

Personal details
- Born: March 14, 1856 Newstead, New York
- Died: August 4, 1905 (aged 49) Buffalo, New York
- Party: Republican

John Laughlin (March 14, 1856 – August 4, 1905) was an American politician from New York.

== Life ==
John Laughlin was born in Newstead, New York on March 14, 1856. He attended the district schools, and Lockport Union School from 1874 to 1878. Then he studied law with Richard Crowley, was admitted to the bar in 1880, and practiced in Buffalo.

He was a member of the New York State Senate (31st D.) from 1888 to 1891, sitting in the 111th, 112th, 113th and 114th New York State Legislatures. He was a delegate to the 1888 Republican National Convention.

He died suddenly on August 4, 1905, in his apartment at the Lenox Hotel in Buffalo, of "apoplexy".

== Sources ==
- The New York Red Book compiled by Edgar L. Murlin (published by James B. Lyon, Albany NY, 1897; pg. 403)
- Biographical sketches of the members of the Legislature in The Evening Journal Almanac (1891)

New York State Senate
Preceded by Daniel H. McMillan	New York State Senate; 31st District; 1888–1891	Succeeded by Matthias Endres
