= John Kelly (Brooklyn politician) =

American politician (1855-1900)

John Kelly (March 23, 1855 − July 18, 1900) was an American politician from New York.

== Life ==
John was born on March 23, 1855, in New York City, the son of Peter Kelly and Rose McLeone. He was baptized a week later in the Church of St. Joseph in Greenwich Village. His parents were Irish immigrants.

The Kelly family moved to Brooklyn, then a separate city from New York City, when John was very young. After graduating from St. Francis Xavier College in Manhattan, he joined his father's building business. They built a number of houses in South Brooklyn.

A Democrat, John unsuccessfully ran for Supervisor as an Independent in 1886. In 1888, he was elected to the New York State Assembly, representing the Kings County 5th District. He served in the Assembly in 1889, 1890, 1891, 1892, and 1893.

John died on July 18, 1900, at his home on 161 Coffey St. He was buried in Holy Cross Cemetery in Flatbush.

New York State Assembly
| Preceded by Daniel B. Farrell | New York State Assembly; Kings County, 5th District; 1889-1892 | Succeeded by Hubert G. Taylor |
| Preceded by Lawrence E. Malone | New York State Assembly; Kings County, 9th District; 1893 | Succeeded by William E. Melody |
