= Frank M. Jones =

American merchant and politician

Frank Marion Jones (November 18, 1847 – January 28, 1922) was an American merchant and politician from New York.

== Life ==
Jones was born on November 18, 1847, in Union Hill, New York, the son of Chester Jones and Hannah Millard. After attending the local school he initially worked on the family farm. In 1867, he took over his dying father's store and worked there for the next three years. After his marriage, he moved to Ontario and owned a general store there for four years. While living in Ontario, he served as town clerk and assessor

Jones then moved back to Union Hill, where he built and owned the main store. He also secured and named the Union Hill post office, and served as its first postmaster for about ten years. In 1885, he was elected town supervisor and served in that position for the five years. In 1886, he sold his store and started a hardware store. In 1890, he moved to the village of Webster, where he purchased an extensive general store. He also served as inspector of the Monroe County Penitentiary.

In 1889, Jones was elected to the New York State Assembly as a Republican, representing the Monroe County 1st District. He served in the Assembly in 1890, 1891, and 1892. In 1908, he was elected treasurer of Monroe County. He was an alternate delegate to the 1908 and 1912 Republican National Conventions, and was a delegate to the 1915 New York Constitutional Convention.

Jones married M. Louise Cranmer of Ontario in 1869. He was a freemason and a Shriner, and was a member and trustee of the Webster Presbyterian Church.

Jones died at home from Bright's disease and heart trouble on January 28, 1922. He was buried in Webster Rural Cemetery.

New York State Assembly
Preceded by Judson F. Sheldon	New York State Assembly; Monroe County, 1st District; 1890-1892	Succeeded by Samuel H. Stone
