= James W. Birkett =

English shipbuilder and shipowner

James W. Birkett (July 13, 1841 – June 29, 1898) was an English-American manufacturer and politician.

== Life ==
Birkett was born on July 13, 1841, in Manchester, England. He immigrated to America with his parents when he was four.

Birkett initially lived in New York City, New York, but in 1854 he moved to Brooklyn. After finishing school, he was initially apprenticed as a plumber. He then began manufacturing and erecting steam and hot water plants as well as engineer supplies. In around 1890, he organized the James W. Brikett Company, with himself as president.

Birkett was treasurer of the Brooklyn Republican Party for several years, an alderman in 1885 and 1886, and a presidential elector in the 1888 presidential election. In 1889, he was elected to the New York State Senate as a Republican, representing New York's 3rd State Senate district. He served in the Senate in 1890 and 1891.

Birkett served on the Volunteer Fire Department and was a member of the Exempt Fireman's Association. He helped organize a local Freemason lodge and served as its president. He was also a member of the Masonic Veterans' Association, the Knights Templar, the Shriners, and an honorary member of the Grand Army of the Republic. He served as treasurer of Talmage's Tabernacle. He had a wife, two sons, and two daughters.

Birkett died at home on June 29, 1898. He was buried in Cypress Hills Cemetery.

New York State Senate
Preceded by Eugene F. O'Connor	New York State Senate; 3rd District; 1890–1891	Succeeded by Joseph Aspinall
