= Wilbur H. Selleck =

American politician

Wilbur H. Selleck (November 9, 1850 – March 15, 1913) was an American politician from New York.

== Life ==
Selleck was born on November 9, 1850, in Canajoharie, New York, the son of George Selleck and Margaret Wild. He attended Palmyra Union School and Canajoharie Academy.

Selleck initially clerked in a store, then worked as bookkeeper. He later worked in the drug business in Williamstown. He served as town clerk from 1879 to 1884, and was town supervisor from 1884 to 1890. He was also overseer of the poor for a year and was also a member of the Oswego County Republican Committee. He also owned a shoe store in Oswego.

In 1889, Selleck was elected to the New York State Assembly as a Republican, representing the Oswego County 2nd District. He served in the Assembly in 1890, 1891, and 1892. He served as sheriff from 1894 to 1897. In 1898, he was appointed deputy customs collector. He resigned from the position in September 1912 for health reasons.

Selleck was a freemason and a member of the Benevolent and Protective Order of Elks. In 1870, he married Flora Filkins. They had two daughters, Fannie M. and Lena M.

Selleck died at home in Oswego on March 15, 1913.

New York State Assembly
Preceded by Danforth E. Ainsworth	New York State Assembly; Oswego County, 2nd District; 1890-1892	Succeeded by District Abolished
