= Thomas Hunter (New York politician) =

American politician (1834–1903)

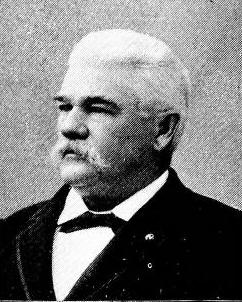
Thomas Hunter (1893)

Thomas Hunter (September 11, 1834 – March 11, 1903) was an American businessman and politician from New York.

== Life ==
Hunter was born on September 11, 1834, in Baltimore, Maryland.

He attended the common schools, worked on a farm, and then took part in the construction of the Manassas Gap Railroad. From 1857 to 1860, he engaged in the milling business in Sterling Valley. During the American Civil War he enlisted as a private in the 110th New York Volunteers, and finished the war as a captain. After the war he engaged in the lumber business, and then became a railroad contractor.

He was a member of the New York State Assembly (Cayuga Co., 1st D.) in 1881 and 1882.

He was a member of the New York State Senate (26th D.) from 1890 to 1893, sitting in the 113th, 114th, 115th and 116th New York State Legislatures.

Hunter died on March 11, 1903, in Sterling, New York.

== Sources ==
- The New York Red Book compiled by Edgar L. Murlin (published by James B. Lyon, Albany NY, 1897; pg. 403f and 500f)
- Sketches of the Members of the Legislature in The Evening Journal Almanac (1882)
- Obituary Notes; Ex-State Senator THOMAS HUNTER died... in NYT on March 12, 1903

New York State Assembly
Preceded by Harvey D. Ferris	New York State Assembly; Cayuga County, 1st District; 1881–1882	Succeeded by Josiah H. Hamilton
New York State Senate
Preceded by William L. Sweet	New York State Senate; 26th District; 1890–1893	Succeeded by Charles T. Saxton
