= William H. Denniston =

American politician

William Henry Denniston (March 10, 1850 – March 11, 1936) was an American politician from New York.

== Life ==
Denniston was born on March 10, 1850, in Rochester, New York. He was of partial Irish parentage. He attended the Eastman Business College in Poughkeepsie.

He later settled in Parma Center, in Parma, New York. He had a general merchandising establishment there, along with a stock farm to breed and train race horses. He served as Town Clerk and Overseer of the Poor for eight years, town supervisor for four years, and from 1882 to 1889 was the Postmaster. From 1886 to 1889 he was also manager of the Monroe County Penitentiary. When George W. Aldridge was cementing his power as the leader of the Monroe County Republican Party, Denniston served as his assistant.

In 1890, Denniston was elected to the New York State Assembly as a Republican, representing the Monroe County 3rd District. He served in the Assembly in 1891, 1892, 1893, and 1894.

In the turn of the century Denniston moved to Rochester with his children. They helped build the Rochester Public Market in 1904 and the Cobbs Hill Reservoir in 1906. He later ran a grocery store with his son Louis.

His wife was Anna Palmer. Their three sons were Charles W., Frank J., and Louis F.

Denniston died at home in Rochester on March 11, 1936, the day after his 86th birthday. He was buried in the Parma Union Cemetery.

New York State Assembly
Preceded by Edwin A. Loder	New York State Assembly; Monroe County, 3rd District; 1891-1894	Succeeded by William W. Armstrong (politician)
