= John Christie (New York politician) =

American politician (1824–1893)

- Born: October 20, 1824
- Died: March 24, 1893 (aged 68)

John Christie (October 20, 1824 – March 24, 1893) was an American glove manufacturer and politician from New York.

== Life ==
Christie was born on October 20, 1824, in Mayfield, New York. His parents, John Christie and Janet Robertson, were Scottish immigrants from Blair, Perthshire, Scotland.

Christie attended the Kingsboro Academy. He taught at school for several years and briefly had a business in Albany. He spent six years in Jackson Summit, where he erected a tannery and tanned sole leather. He then moved to Gloversville and spent 21 years as foreman of A. C. Churchill's glove factory.

Christie served as Assistant Doorkeeper of the New York State Assembly in 1879, 1880, and 1885. In 1889, he was elected to the Assembly as a Republican, representing Fulton and Hamilton Counties. He served in the Assembly in 1890 and 1891. While in the Assembly, he introduced and secured passage of a charter that made Gloversville a city.

Christie attended the Congregational Church. In 1848, he married Ann Vrooman. Their children were Edward, Eugene, Frank, Mrs. William T. Lintner, and Mrs. Seymour Grinnell. Ann was a great-granddaughter of Colonel Peter Vrooman.

Christie died at home on March 24, 1893. He was buried in Prospect Hill Cemetery in Gloversville.

New York State Assembly
Preceded by Lewis Brownell	New York State Assembly; Fulton and Hamilton Counties; 1890–1891	Succeeded by Horace S. Judson
