= Henry H. Green =

American politician

Henry Harper Green (July 23, 1837 – May 9, 1921) was an American physician and politician from New York.

== Life ==
Green was born on July 23, 1837, in Paines Hollow, New York. His parents were Dr. Abel Green and Eliza Harter.

Green attended school in Little Falls and the Fairfield Academy. In 1859, he graduated from Geneva Medical College, the same medical school his father attended. He lived and had a large practice in Paines Hollow. He was a member of the New York State Medical Society and president of the Herkimer County Agricultural Society.

In 1890, Green was elected to the New York State Assembly as a Republican, representing Herkimer County. He served in the Assembly in 1891 and 1892.

Green was a Methodist. In 1855, he married Julia Loomis. They had three daughters, Mary E., Alice R., and Eliza H.

Green died at home on May 9, 1921. He was buried in the Mohawk Cemetery.

New York State Assembly
Preceded by John D. Henderson	New York State Assembly; Herkimer County; 1891-1892	Succeeded by William C. Prescott
