= Alvin J. Quackenbush =

American politician

Alvin J. Quackenbush (June 20, 1852 – January 6, 1921) was an American merchant and politician from New York.

== Life ==
Quackenbush was born on June 20, 1852, in Guilderland, New York. He attended Albany Business College.

After working on a farm and working in his father's wholesale commission office in Albany, Quackenbush moved to Fuller's Station and worked in the hay business. Five years later, he moved to Schenectady and continued the hay business. In 1889, he became the eastern agent of Anheuser-Busch. He also owned a 200-acre farm in Saratoga County, near Ballston. He served as alderman for several terms, and was commissioner of public works.

In 1890, Quackenbush was elected to the New York State Assembly as a Democrat, representing Schenectady County. He served in the Assembly in 1891, 1892, and 1893. He was a delegate to the 1892 Democratic National Convention.

Quackenbush married Amelia Van Wie; they had a daughter, Olive.

== Death ==
Quackenbush died of blood poisoning on January 6, 1921, aged 68. He was buried in Prospect Hill Cemetery in Guilderland.

New York State Assembly
Preceded by George W. Van Vranken	New York State Assembly; Schenectady County; 1891–1893	Succeeded by John C. Myers
