= Burton B. Lewis =

American politician

Burton B. Lewis (September 3, 1856 – November 21, 1938) was an American cheese manufacturer from New York.

== Lewis ==
Lewis was born on September 3, 1856, in Rushford, New York, the son of Jerome B. Lewis and Mary E. VanDusen. He later moved to Sandusky, living in that area for most of his life.

Lewis attended the Ten Broeck Academy in Franklinville in 1872, the Arcade Academy in 1873, and Bryant & Stratton's Commercial College in Buffalo from 1876 to 1877. He worked in cheese making from 1870 to 1876 while attending school. He then worked with his father as cashier and bookkeeper of the Sandusky Combination Cheese Factories. He was a town clerk for Freedom from 1878 to 1881, and was town supervisor from 1882 to 1889 and from 1892 to 1893. He was also involved in real estate operations in Buffalo.

In 1889, Lewis was elected to the New York State Assembly as a Republican, representing the Cattaragus County 1st District. He served in the Assembly in 1890 and 1891.

Lewis belonged to the Methodist Church. In 1878, he married Cora V. Law of Sandusky. Their children were Leah, Lora, Ruth, Mary, Genevieve, and Margary.

Lewis died at his daughter Mrs. Foster Joselyn's home in Sandusky on November 21, 1938. He was buried in Sandusky Cemetery.

New York State Assembly
| Preceded by George N. West | New York State Assembly; Cattaraugus County, 1st District; 1890–1891 | Succeeded by William E. Wheeler |
