= Howard Thornton =

American politician from New York (1849–1917)

Howard Thornton (February 25, 1849 – January 13, 1917) was an American lawyer and politician from New York.

== Life ==
Thornton was born on February 25, 1849, in Governor's Island, New York, the son of General William A. Thornton and Helen Smith. William A. Thornton, a West Point graduate and veteran of the Black Hawk War, the Seminole Wars, the Mexican-American War, and the American Civil War, was stationed on Governor's Island at the time of Thornton's birth.

After graduating from New York City public school in 1865, Thornton began attending the City College of New York for the next two years. He was planning on using his father's influence to get into West Point, but his father died and he was unable to get admitted. Instead, he attended Union College in Schenectady, graduating from there in 1872.

Thornton then studied law under Eugene A. Brewster of Newburgh. He also began attending Albany Law School, graduating in 1874. He returned to Newburgh and Mr. Brewster's law office, and in 1883 he opened his own law office. He also served as president of the board of trustees of Washington's Headquarters State Historic Site and a member of the board of education. He also served as director and president of the National Bank of Newburgh.

In 1891, Thornton was elected to the New York State Assembly as a Republican, representing the Orange County 1st District. He served in the Assembly in 1892, 1893, and 1894.

Thornton was a member of the Sons of the American Revolution, via his grandfather John Thornton and great-grandfather Samuel Clyde. His great-grandfather William Thornton was believed to be the brother of Matthew Thornton, one of the signers of the Declaration of Independence. He was Master of his local freemason lodge, and was a member of the Royal Arch Masonry, the Knights Templar, and the Chi Psi fraternity, the University Club of New York, and the Loyal Legion of the United States. He was also a trustee of Union College, a trustee and director of the Newburgh City Club, and an honorary member of a local fire company.

Thornton died from a stroke in his apartment in the Palatine Hotel on January 13, 1917. He was buried in Cedar Hill Cemetery and Mausoleum in Newburgh.

New York State Assembly
Preceded by Grant B. Taylor	New York State Assembly; Orange County, 1st District; 1892-1894	Succeeded by Louis F. Goodsell
