= George W. Dickinson =

American politician

George W. Dickinson (January 16, 1843 – October 2, 1928) was an American politician and diplomat from New York. A Republican, he served in the New York State Assembly from Cayuga County and was later appointed United States consul at Acapulco, Mexico.

== Life ==
Dickinson was born on January 16, 1843, in Aurelius, New York.

Dickinson attended Auburn Academy. He worked as a farmer, teacher, and dealer in leaf tobacco. At some point, he moved to Port Byron and became active in politics there, serving as town supervisor of Mentz for several terms.

In 1889, Dickinson was elected to the New York State Assembly as a Republican, representing the Cayuga County 1st District. He served in the Assembly in 1890 and 1891. In 1898, he was appointed United States Consul at Acapulco, Mexico. He retired as Consul in 1908. Two years later, he moved to Auburn and lived with his daughter for the rest of his life.

Dickinson attended the Port Byron Methodist Church. He was a master of his local Freemason lodge. He had two children, Mrs. Maude I. Jones and C. Elbert.

Dickinson died at home on October 2, 1928. He was buried in Mount Pleasant Cemetery.

New York State Assembly
Preceded by John E. Savery	New York State Assembly; Cayuga County, 1st District; 1890–1891	Succeeded by Charles Clinton Adams
