= Levi Parsons Gillette =

American politician

Levi Parsons Gillette (February 19, 1832 – December 10, 1903) was an American farmer and politician from New York.

== Life ==
Gillette was born on February 19, 1832, in Henrietta, New York. He moved to Niagara County when he was four. His parents were Eliphalet Gillette and Lydia Miner.

Gillette attended Wilson Academy in the winter and worked on a farm in the summer. He later worked as a farmer and fruit-grower in Youngstown. He was a town assessor for three years.

In 1890, Gillette was elected to the New York State Assembly as a Democrat, representing the Niagara County 2nd District. He served in the Assembly in 1891 and 1892.

Gillette died at home on December 10, 1903. He was buried in Glenwood Cemetery in Lockport.

New York State Assembly
Preceded by J. Marville Harwood	New York State Assembly; Niagara County, 2nd District; 1891-1892	Succeeded by District Abolished
