= George P. Webster =

American politician

George Parmlee Webster (June 24, 1828 – January 11, 1899) was an American lawyer and politician.

== Life ==
Webster was born on June 24, 1828, in Watertown, Connecticut, the son of George Butler Webster and Eliza Jane Noys. He was a descendant of Connecticut colonial governor John Webster through his father's side.

Webster studied at the Lancasterian School in New Haven under John E. Lovel. He then moved to Newport, Kentucky, and studied law in his uncle Francis M. Webster's law firm Webster & Root. In 1849, before he was admitted to the bar, he moved to California during the California Gold Rush. He spent three years there, prospecting the mining region from the North Yuba to the Mohave. He spent the winter of 1851–1852 in Death Valley, after which he went to the northern mines. In 1853, he returned to Newport, resumed his law studies, and was admitted to the bar. In 1854, he was elected District Attorney of Campbell County. He was then appointed City Solicitor of Newport, an office he held for six years.

In 1861, Webster was elected to the Kentucky Legislature as a Union Democrat, representing Campbell County. In 1861, he was the deciding vote against neutrality, 96–97, which kept Kentucky in the Union during the American Civil War. In honor of the vote, a salute of 97 guns was fired from New York City Hall Park. He was also the deciding vote to elect Garret Davis to the United States Senate from Kentucky. President Lincoln then appointed and commissioned him assistant quartermaster in the Union Army with the rank of captain. He became major and lieutenant-colonel by brevet in December 1865. He was then brevetted colonel in February 1866. He served in the field in Kentucky with Generals Lew Wallace, Grant, and Goodloe. He was also in charge of the post in Covington and Cincinnati. When the Confederates were moving in on Covington and General Burnside needed supplies to defend the state, Webster provided Burnside's army with $500,000 worth of rations and clothing while the army was on the move. He handled a total of 40 million dollars of government and property during the war. He declined an offer of commission in the regular army and was honorably discharged in October 1866. After the war, he moved to New York City and practiced law there.

In 1889, Webster was elected to the New York State Assembly as a Tammany Democrat, representing the New York County 23rd District. He served in the Assembly in 1890, 1891, 1892 (when he introduced bills that appropriated three million dollars for repaving the streets establish a pumping station, abolished the aqueduct commission, authorized the New York Central to build a bridge above the Harlem River, and authorized the consolidation of all street railways in New York City), and 1893 (when, as chairman of the Committee on Affairs of Cities, introduced a number of bills, including to enlarge the Metropolitan Museum of Art and the Museum of Natural History, abolish the power of dock commissioners to issue bonds, keep New York City's water supply pure, provide for the consolidation of New York City and Brooklyn, remove New York City Hall from City Hall Park, establish a speedway along the Harlem River, settle wrongful assessments, remove the reservoir in Bryant Park, and appropriate $150,000 to convert Castle Garden into an aquarium. In the Assembly, he passed a law that gave women the right to make a will without the knowledge or consent of the husband as well as an act that made the mother and father joint guardians of minor children instead of just the father.

Webster became a member of the New York State Bar Association in 1889. In 1891, he formed a partnership with Lyman W. Redington, which they maintained for several years. He was a corporate member of the Knights Templar and a member of the Grand Army of the Republic and the Loyal Legion. He was also a member of the New York Press Club, publisher of a Harlem newspaper, and a contributor of the New York press for thirty years. In 1856, he married Agnes Hayman, daughter of an old Kentucky family. They had two daughters and two sons. The sons were both lawyers.

Webster died at home from Bright's disease on January 11, 1899.

New York State Assembly
Preceded by Augustus Strassburg	New York State Assembly; New York County, 23rd District; 1890–1892	Succeeded by William Bruce Ellison
Preceded by District Created	New York State Assembly; New York County, 27th District; 1893	Succeeded by Thomas H. Robertson
