= Matthias Endres =

American politician (1852–??)

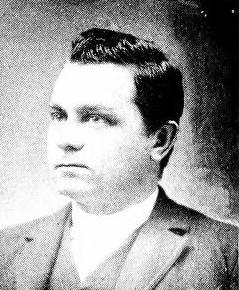
Matthias Endres (1893)

Matthias Endres (born July 6, 1852 in Buffalo, New York) was an American lawyer and politician from New York.

== Life ==
He attended the public schools, and then became a compositor, and later a gas fitter. He studied law, was admitted to the bar, and practiced in Buffalo.

He was a member of the New York State Assembly (Erie Co., 2nd D.) in 1888, 1889, 1890 and 1891.

He was a member of the New York State Senate (31st D.) in 1892 and 1893; and was Chairman of the Committee on Canals, and of the Committee on Indian Affairs.

== Sources ==
- The New York Red Book compiled by Edgar L. Murlin (published by James B. Lyon, Albany NY, 1897; pg. 403f, 503f and 508)
- Biographical sketches of the members of the Legislature in The Evening Journal Almanac (1892)
- New York State Legislative Souvenir for 1893 with Portraits of the Members of Both Houses by Henry P. Phelps (pg. 12)

New York State Assembly
Preceded by Frank M. Giese	New York State Senate; Erie County, 2nd District; 1888–1891	Succeeded by Jacob Goldberg
New York State Senate
Preceded by John Laughlin	New York State Senate; 31st District; 1892–1893	Succeeded by Henry H. Persons
