= Danforth E. Ainsworth =

American lawyer and politician (1848–1927)

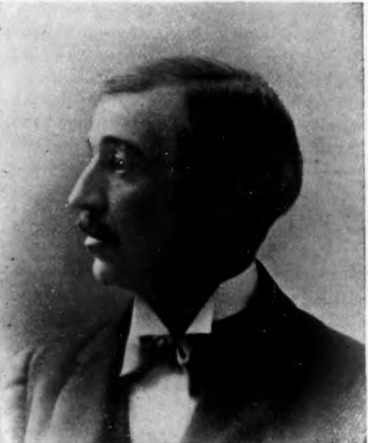
- Born: December 29, 1848; Clayton, New York, U.S.
- Died: October 25, 1927 (aged 78)
- Education: Pulaski Academy, Falley Seminary, Union University
- Occupations: lawyer and politician
- Years active: 1886–1895 (politician)
- Political party: Republican
- Spouse: Annie P. Porte (m. 1874)
- Parents: Henry Ainsworth (father); Philomena Allen (mother)

Danforth Emmit Ainsworth (November 29, 1848 – October 25, 1927) was an American lawyer and politician from New York.

== Life ==
Ainsworth was born on November 29, 1848, in Clayton, New York, the son of Henry Ainsworth and Philomena Allen. Shortly after his birth, the family moved to Sandy Creek, where his father owned a farm. He attended Pulaski Academy and the Falley Seminary in Fulton.

After graduating from Union University, Ainsworth began studying law under Henry L. Howe of Oswego. He was admitted to the bar in 1873. He served as a trustee of the village of Sandy Creek from 1881 to 1883, and was on the village's board of education.

In 1885, Ainsworth was elected to the New York State Assembly as a Republican, representing the Oswego County 2nd District. He served in the Assembly in 1886, 1887, 1888, 1889, 1893, 1894, and 1895. He served as the Majority Leader and Chairman of the Ways and Means Committee in 1894 and 1895.

Ainsworth served as Deputy State Superintendent of Public Instruction from 1895 to 1904. From 1906 to 1907, he was Deputy Attorney General. He was also president of the Albany Board of Education from 1908 to 1912. In 1907, he began practicing law in Albany, where he maintained a law office until his death.

In 1874, Ainsworth married Annie P. Porter. They had no children. He was a trustee and first vice-president of the Albany Institute and Historical and Art Society, a trustee of Albany Law School, a member of the Albany County Bar Association and the New York State Bar Association.

Ainsworth died at home on October 25, 1927, 6 months after his wife Annie's death from pneumonia. He was buried in the family plot in Woodlawn Cemetery in Sandy Creek.

New York State Assembly
Preceded by Gouverneur M. Sweet	New York State Assembly; Oswego County, 2nd District; 1886–1889	Succeeded by Wilbur H. Selleck
Preceded by District Created	New York State Assembly; Oswego County; 1893–1895	Succeeded by District Abolished
