= Charles T. Saxton =

American lawyer and politician from New York

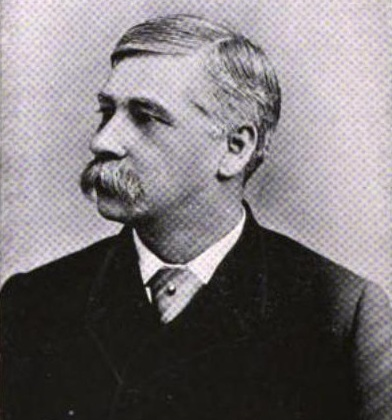
Charles T. Saxton

Charles Terry Saxton (July 2, 1846 in Clyde, Wayne County, New York – October 23, 1903 in Rochester, Monroe County, New York) was an American lawyer and a Republican politician from New York.

== Life and politics ==
He was the son of Daniel Saxton and Eliza A. Saxton. He was educated at the Clyde High School. He was a member of the Young Men's Debating Club in Cortland (which later became the Delphic Fraternity.)

In 1861, he joined the 19th Regiment of New York Volunteers, and finished the American Civil War as a major. He fought in the Red River Campaign and in the Battle of Port Hudson. Afterwards he studied law and was admitted to the bar. He was a Justice of the Peace, and President of the Village of Clyde.

He was an alternate delegate to the 1884 Republican National Convention, and a delegate to the 1900 Republican National Convention.

He was a member of the New York State Assembly (Wayne Co., 1st D.) in 1887, 1888 and 1889. In 1888, as Chairman of the Judiciary Committee, he took charge of the Ballot Reform Bill and secured its passage in both Assembly and Senate, but it was vetoed by Gov. David B. Hill. The next year, he had the bill passed again, but it was vetoed again by Hill.

He was a member of the New York State Senate from 1890 to 1894, sitting in the 113th, 114th, 115th, 116th (all four 28th D.) and 117th New York State Legislatures (26th D.); and was President pro tempore in 1894. In 1890, considering the governor's objections, he made a few changes to the Ballot Reform Bill and had it passed again, and it was finally enacted. He also was largely instrumental for the Electric Execution Bill to be passed and enacted. In 1891, he was appointed Chancellor of Union College, and the College awarded him the honorary degree of LL.D.

In the session of 1892, he made a strong but unsuccessful fight against the re-apportionment of the state, and for his refusal to vote on an enumeration bill (voting reapportionment) he and two other senators were declared guilty of contempt by Lt. Gov. William F. Sheehan and their names taken from the roll. But they were supported by the judiciary committee in their position, were purged of contempt and their names restored.

He was the Lieutenant Governor of New York from 1895 to 1896, elected on the Republican ticket with Levi P. Morton at the New York state election, 1894. On November 19, 1896, his wife Helen M. Saxton died at Clyde.

On March 30, 1897, he was appointed one of the first judges of the New York Court of Claims, to take office on January 1, 1898, for a six-year term. Until the end of 1897, this body had been the Board of Claims, with three commissioners. He was chosen Chief Judge, and died in office.

Because of his failing health, he went in late 1903 to Clifton Springs, New York, but did not get better. After several weeks, he entered the City Hospital at Rochester, and died a week later.

== See also ==
- List of New York Legislature members expelled or censured

New York State Assembly
Preceded by William Wood	New York State Assembly; Wayne County, 1st District; 1887–1889	Succeeded by John P. Bennett
New York State Senate
Preceded by John Raines	New York State Senate; 28th District; 1890–1893	Succeeded by Cornelius R. Parsons
Preceded by Thomas Hunter	New York State Senate; 26th District; 1894	Succeeded by John Raines
Political offices
Preceded by Jacob A. Cantor	President pro tempore of the New York State Senate; 1894	Succeeded by Edmund O'Connor
Preceded by William F. Sheehan	Lieutenant Governor of New York; 1895–1896	Succeeded by Timothy L. Woodruff
