= Edward Cole =

Edward, Ed or Eddie Cole may refer to:

- Edward Cole (Winchester MP) (1549–1617), English MP for Winchester
- Edward William Cole (1832–1918), Australian businessman, entrepreneur and publisher
- Edward M. Cole (1844–1915), American newspaper editor and politician
- Edward Irham Cole (1859–1942), Australian theatrical entrepreneur and film director
- Edward B. Cole (1879–1918), United States Marine Corps officer
- Ed Cole (1909–1977), American car manufacturer
- Ed Cole (baseball) (1909–1999), American baseball pitcher
- Eddie Cole (musician) (1910–1970), American jazz musician
- Ned Cole (1917–2002), American Episcopal bishop
- Eddie Cole (American football coach) (1919–2015), American football player and coach
- E. Nelson Cole (Edward Nelson Cole, born 1937), member of the North Carolina General Assembly
- Carroll Cole (Carroll Edward Cole, 1938–1985), American serial killer
- Eddie Cole (linebacker) (born 1956), American football player

== See also ==
- Ted Cole (disambiguation)
- Edwin Cole (disambiguation)
