= 115th New York State Legislature =

New York state legislative session

←	114th	116th	→
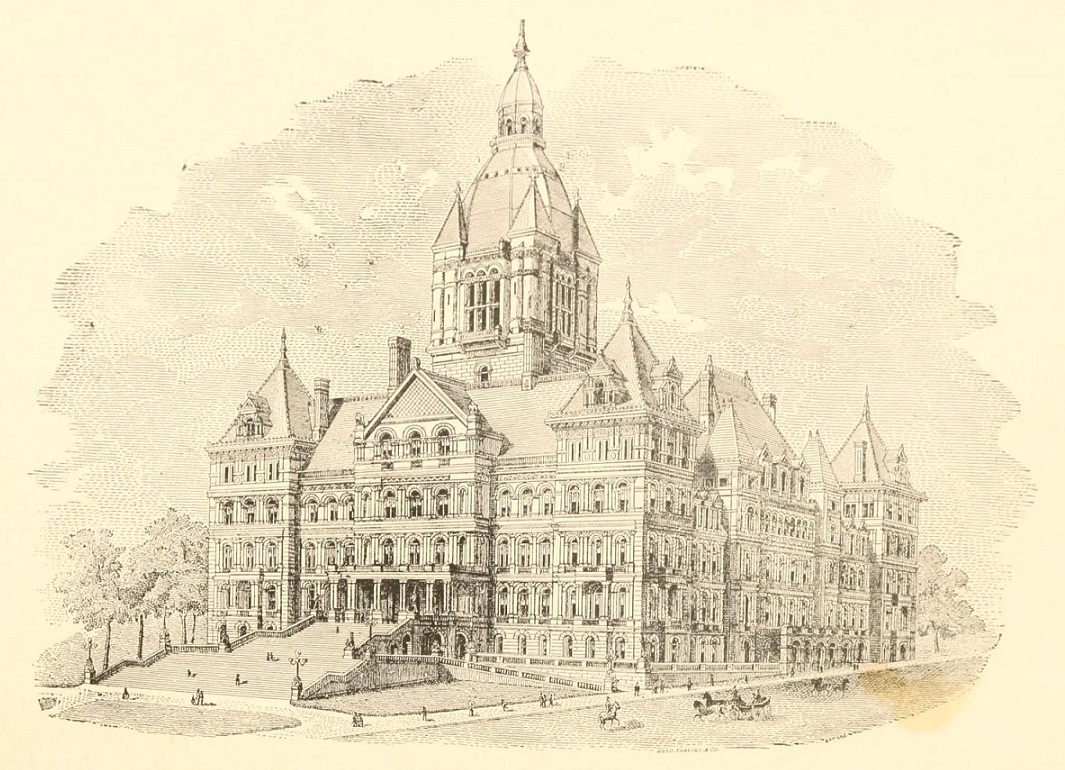
- New York State Capitol (1892)

Overview
- Legislative body: New York State Legislature
- Jurisdiction: New York, United States
- Term: January 1 – December 31, 1892

Senate
- Members: 32
- President: Lt. Gov. William F. Sheehan (D)
- Temporary President: Jacob A. Cantor (D)
- Party control: Democratic (17-14-1)

Assembly
- Members: 128
- Speaker: Robert P. Bush (D)
- Party control: Democratic (66-61-1)

Sessions
- 1st: January 5 – April 25, 1892
- 2nd: April 25 – 26, 1892

The 115th New York State Legislature, consisting of the New York State Senate and the New York State Assembly, met from January 5 to April 26, 1892, during the first year of Roswell P. Flower's governorship, in Albany.

== Background ==
Under the provisions of the New York Constitution of 1846, 32 Senators and 128 assemblymen were elected in single-seat districts; senators for a two-year term, assemblymen for a one-year term. The senatorial districts were made up of entire counties, except New York County (seven districts) and Kings County (three districts). The Assembly districts were made up of entire towns, or city wards, forming a contiguous area, all within the same county.

At this time there were two major political parties: the Democratic Party and the Republican Party. In New York City, the Democrats were split into three factions: Tammany Hall, the "County Democracy" and the "New York Democracy". The Prohibition Party and the Socialist Labor Party also nominated tickets.

== Elections ==
The 1891 New York state election was held on November 3. Roswell P. Flower was elected Governor; and Speaker William F. Sheehan was elected Lieutenant Governor, both Democrats. The other five statewide elective offices up for election were also carried by the Democrats. The approximate party strength at this election, as expressed by the vote for Governor, was: Democratic 585,000; Republican 535,000; Prohibition 30,000; and Socialist Labor 15,000.

This was the first time that seats in the Legislature were contested in the courts. Previously, since Independence in 1777, seats could be contested only in the Legislature, after the beginning of the session, and it took usually a long time to come to a conclusion. Most contestants whose claims were found to be correct, were seated only a few days before the end of the session. Now it became possible to take the contest to the courts, swiftly being decided by New York Court of Appeals, before the session began. At this time, the Court of Appeals was composed of five Democrats and two Republicans, and ruled in favor of Democrats Edward B. Osborne, John A. Nichols and Charles E. Walker who were referred to in the press as "usurpers", holding their seats by fraud. Seven more seats were then contested in the Legislature.

== Sessions ==
The Legislature met for the regular session at the State Capitol in Albany on January 5, 1892; and adjourned on April 25.

Robert P. Bush (D) was elected Speaker with 65 votes against 55 for James W. Husted (R).

Jacob A. Cantor (D) was elected president pro tempore of the State Senate with 15 votes against 14 for George Z. Erwin (R).

On January 13, the Democratic senators met in caucus to discuss the scheme of unseating Republicans John H. Derby and Harvey J. Donaldson. Senator William L. Brown refused to go along with the scheme.

On January 14, Senators George Z. Erwin, Edmund O'Connor and Charles T. Saxton (all three Rep.) refused to vote on a substitute Enumeration Bill, and were declared in contempt by the Democratic majority.

On January 20, the Enumeration Bill was finally passed. It had been due in 1885, but Republicans and Democrats could not agree on the terms. The Census Bill passed by Republican majorities in the Legislature of 1885 was vetoed by Gov. David B. Hill. In 1892, for the first time since 1885 the majorities in both Houses of the Legislature and the Governor were of the same party, and the enumeration bill was rushed through. The enumeration was needed as a basis for the re-apportionment of the Senate and Assembly districts.

On February 10, the Legislature elected James F. Crooker (Dem.) as Superintendent of Public Instruction, with 81 votes against 71 for Andrew S. Draper (Rep.), to succeed Draper on April 7 for a term of three years.

The Legislature met for a special session on April 25, at 8.30 p.m., to consider the re-apportionment of the Senate districts and the number of assemblymen per county.

On April 26, the Re-Apportionment Bill was passed by a vote of 17 to 1 (the 14 Republicans refused to vote) in the Senate; and by a vote of 67 to 58 in the Assembly. Cattaraugus, Cayuga, Chautauqua, Jefferson, Niagara, Oneida, Oswego, Otsego, Saratoga, Ulster, Washington and Wayne counties lost one seat each; St. Lawrence County lost two seats; Erie and Queens counties gained one seat each; and Kings and New York counties gained six seats each.

On August 5, Monroe County Judge Rumsey declared the Re-Apportionment Bill as unconstitutional and void.

On September 23, Supreme Court Justice Stephen L. Mayham declared the Re-Apportionment Bill as constitutional.

On October 13, the Court of Appeals upheld the Re-Apportionment Bill by a party vote of 5 to 2.

== State Senate ==
=== Districts ===
- 1st District: Queens and Suffolk counties
- 2nd District: 1st, 2nd, 5th, 6th, 8th, 9th, 10th, 12th and 22nd Ward of the City of Brooklyn, and the towns of Flatbush, Gravesend and New Utrecht in Kings County
- 3rd District: 3rd, 4th, 7th, 11th, 13th, 19th, 20th, 21st and 23rd Ward of the City of Brooklyn
- 4th District: 14th, 15th, 16th, 17th, 18th, 24th and 25th Ward of the City of Brooklyn, and the towns of New Lots and Flatlands in Kings County
- 5th District: Richmond County and the 1st, 2nd, 3rd, 5th, 6th, 8th, 14th and parts of the 4th and 9th Ward of New York City
- 6th District: 7th, 11th, 13th and part of the 4th Ward of NYC
- 7th District: 10th, 17th and part of the 15th, 18th and 21st Ward of NYC
- 8th District: 16th and part of the 9th, 15th, 18th, 20th and 21st Ward of NYC
- 9th District: Part of the 18th, 19th and 21st Ward of NYC
- 10th District: Part of the 12th, 19th, 20th, 21st and 22nd Ward of NYC
- 11th District: 23rd and 24th, and part of the 12th, 20th and 22nd Ward of NYC
- 12th District: Rockland and Westchester counties
- 13th District: Orange and Sullivan counties
- 14th District: Greene, Schoharie and Ulster counties
- 15th District: Columbia, Dutchess and Putnam counties
- 16th District: Rensselaer and Washington counties
- 17th District: Albany County
- 18th District: Fulton, Hamilton, Montgomery, Saratoga and Schenectady counties
- 19th District: Clinton, Essex and Warren counties
- 20th District: Franklin, Lewis and St. Lawrence counties
- 21st District: Oswego and Jefferson counties
- 22nd District: Oneida County
- 23rd District: Herkimer, Madison and Otsego counties
- 24th District: Chenango, Delaware and Broome counties
- 25th District: Onondaga and Cortland counties
- 26th District: Cayuga, Seneca, Tompkins and Tioga counties
- 27th District: Allegany, Chemung and Steuben counties
- 28th District: Ontario, Schuyler, Wayne and Yates counties
- 29th District: Monroe and Orleans counties
- 30th District: Genesee, Livingston, Niagara and Wyoming counties
- 31st District: Erie County
- 32nd District: Cattaraugus and Chautauqua counties

Note: There are now 62 counties in the State of New York. The counties which are not mentioned in this list had not yet been established, or sufficiently organized, the area being included in one or more of the abovementioned counties.

=== Members ===
The asterisk (*) denotes members of the previous Legislature who continued in office as members of this Legislature. Joseph Aspinall, Martin T. McMahon, Charles P. McClelland, Edward B. Osborne, Cornelius R. Parsons and Matthias Endres changed from the Assembly to the Senate.

Note: For brevity, the chairmanships omit the words "...the Committee on (the)..."

District	Senator	Party	Notes
1st	Edward Floyd-Jones	Democrat	Chairman of Game Laws
2nd	John McCarty	Democrat	Chairman of State Prisons; and of Public Buildings
3rd	Joseph Aspinall*	Republican	
4th	Patrick H. McCarren*	Democrat	Chairman of Commerce and Navigation; and of Public Expenditures
5th	William L. Brown*	Tammany Dem.	Chairman of Affairs of Cities; and of Grievances
6th	John F. Ahearn*	Democrat	Chairman of Banks; and of Public Printing
7th	George F. Roesch*	Tammany Dem.	Chairman of Judiciary
8th	Martin T. McMahon*	Tammany Dem.	Chairman of General Laws; and of Militia
9th	Edward P. Hagan	Tammany Dem.	Chairman of Claims
10th	Jacob A. Cantor*	Tammany Dem.	elected President pro tempore; Chairman of Finance; and of Rules
11th	George W. Plunkitt	Tammany Dem.	Chairman of Miscellaneous Corporations; and of Engrossed Bills
12th	Charles P. McClelland*	Democrat	Chairman of Insurance; and of Joint Library
13th	William P. Richardson*	Republican	contested by C. Frederick Lamont (D)
14th	Clarence E. Bloodgood	Democrat	Chairman of Roads and Bridges; and of Poor Laws
15th	Edward B. Osborne*	Democrat	contested in the courts by Gilbert A. Deane (R); Chairman of Affairs of Villages; and of Erection and Division of Towns and Counties
16th	John H. Derby	Republican	contested by Michael F. Collins (D)
17th	Amasa J. Parker Jr.	Democrat	Chairman of Taxation and Retrenchment; and of Public Health
18th	Harvey J. Donaldson*	Republican	contested by Edward H. Hoyt (D)
19th	Louis W. Emerson*	Republican	
20th	George Z. Erwin*	Republican	Minority Leader
21st	Joseph Mullin	Republican	
22nd	Henry J. Coggeshall*	Republican	
23rd	John E. Smith	Republican	
24th	Edmund O'Connor*	Republican	
25th	John A. Nichols	Democrat	contested in the courts by Rufus T. Peck (R); Chairman of Salt; and of Agriculture
26th	Thomas Hunter*	Republican	
27th	Charles E. Walker	Democrat	seated in place of Franklin D. Sherwood (R); Chairman of Internal Affairs of Towns and Counties; and of Manufactures
28th	Charles T. Saxton*	Republican	
29th	Cornelius R. Parsons*	Republican	
30th	Greenleaf S. Van Gorder*	Republican	contested by Harvey Arnold (D)
31st	Matthias Endres*	Democrat	Chairman of Canals; and of Indian Affairs
32nd	James T. Edwards	Ind. Rep./Dem.	Chairman of Railroads; and of Public Education

=== Employees ===
- Clerk: Charles T. Dunning
- Assistant Clerk: Charles W. Sutherland
- Sergeant-at-Arms: Adelbert E. Tallmadge
- Doorkeeper: Joseph Jerge
- Stenographer: James M. Ruso

== State Assembly ==
=== Assemblymen ===
The asterisk (*) denotes members of the previous Legislature who continued as members of this Legislature.

Note: For brevity, the chairmanships omit the words "...the Committee on (the)..."

District		Assemblymen	Party	Notes
Albany	1st	Artcher La Grange	Democrat	
Albany	2nd	Walter E. Ward*	Republican	
Albany	3rd	Galen R. Hitt*	Democrat	Chairman of Railroads
Albany	4th	John T. Gorman*	Democrat	Chairman of Banks
Allegany		Marcus M. Congdon	Republican	
Broome		Israel T. Deyo*	Republican	
Cattaraugus	1st	William E. Wheeler	Republican	
Cattaraugus	2nd	Solon S. Laing	Democrat	
Cayuga	1st	Charles Clinton Adams	Republican	
Cayuga	2nd	William Leslie Noyes*	Republican	
Chautauqua	1st	Walter C. Gifford*	Republican	
Chautauqua	2nd	Egburt E. Woodbury*	Republican	
Chemung		Robert P. Bush*	Democrat	elected Speaker; Chairman of Rules
Chenango		Charles H. Stanton	Republican	
Clinton		Edward Hall	Democrat	
Columbia		Henry L. Warner	Democrat	
Cortland		James H. Tripp	Republican	
Delaware		James R. Cowan	Republican	
Dutchess	1st	Obed Wheeler	Republican	contested by James H. Russell (D)
Dutchess	2nd	James A. Vanderwater	Democrat	
Erie	1st	John J. Clahan	Democrat	
Erie	2nd	Jacob Goldberg	Democrat	
Erie	3rd	Edward Gallagher*	Republican	
Erie	4th	Henry H. Guenther*	Democrat	Chairman of General Laws
Erie	5th	Myron H. Clark	Republican	
Essex		Walter D. Palmer*	Republican	
Franklin		Allen S. Matthews	Republican	
Fulton and Hamilton		Horace S. Judson	Democrat	
Genesee		Charles N. Reed	Republican	
Greene		Edward M. Cole	Democrat	Chairman of Public Printing
Herkimer		Henry H. Green*	Republican	
Jefferson	1st	Harrison Fuller	Republican	
Jefferson	2nd	Martin L. Willard	Democrat	
Kings	1st	Joseph J. Cahill*	Democrat	Chairman of Unfinished Business
Kings	2nd	William J. Plant	Democrat	
Kings	3rd	John Cooney*	Democrat	Chairman of Privileges and Elections
Kings	4th	John J. O'Connor*	Democrat	Chairman of Fisheries and Game
Kings	5th	John Kelly*	Democrat	Chairman of Printed and Engrossed Bills
Kings	6th	William E. Shields*	Democrat	Chairman of Codes
Kings	7th	Louis C. Ott	Democrat	
Kings	8th	James F. Quigley*	Democrat	Chairman of Revision
Kings	9th	Lawrence E. Malone	Republican	
Kings	10th	Thomas F. Byrnes*	Democrat	Chairman of Federal Relations
Kings	11th	George L. Weed	Republican	
Kings	12th	Charles A. Conrady	Republican	
Lewis		G. Henry P. Gould*	Democrat	Chairman of Canals
Livingston		Jesse Roberts	Republican	
Madison		Clarence W. Dexter	Republican	
Monroe	1st	Frank M. Jones*	Republican	
Monroe	2nd	Richard J. Curran	Republican	contested by John A. Bernhard (D)
Monroe	3rd	William H. Denniston*	Republican	
Montgomery		George J. Gove	Democrat	
New York	1st	Patrick H. Duffy*	Tammany Dem.	Chairman of Public Health
New York	2nd	Timothy D. Sullivan*	Tammany Dem.	Chairman of Commerce and Navigation
New York	3rd	Percival Farquhar*	Tammany Dem.	Chairman of Military Affairs
New York	4th	Patrick H. Roche*	Tammany Dem.	
New York	5th	Dominick F. Mullaney*	Tammany Dem.	
New York	6th	Samuel J. Foley*	Tammany Dem.	Chairman of Excise
New York	7th	Alfred R. Conkling	Republican	
New York	8th	Philip Wissig	Democrat	Chairman of Soldiers' Home
New York	9th	William H. Walker	Tammany Dem.	
New York	10th	William Sohmer*	Democrat	Chairman of Public Institutions
New York	11th	William N. Hoag	Republican	
New York	12th	Moses Dinkelspiel*	Tammany Dem.	Chairman of Trade and Manufactures
New York	13th	James H. Southworth*	Tammany Dem.	Chairman of Public Education
New York	14th	William Sulzer*	Tammany Dem.	Chairman of Judiciary
New York	15th	Louis Drypolcher*	Tammany Dem.	
New York	16th	Walter G. Byrne*	Tammany Dem.	
New York	17th	Thomas J. McManus	New York Dem.	Chairman of Claims
New York	18th	Daniel F. Martin*	Tammany Dem.	Chairman of Electricity, Gas and Water Supply
New York	19th	John Connelly*	Tammany Dem.	Chairman of Insurance
New York	20th	Myer J. Stein*	Tammany Dem.	Chairman of Public Lands and Forestry
New York	21st	Louis H. Hahlo	Tammany Dem.	Chairman of Charitable and Religious Societies
New York	22nd	William J. O'Dair	Independent	
New York	23rd	George P. Webster*	Tammany Dem.	Chairman of Affairs of Cities
New York	24th	James L. Wells	Republican	
Niagara	1st	Garwood L. Judd*	Democrat	Chairman of Indian Affairs
Niagara	2nd	Levi Parsons Gillette*	Democrat	Chairman of Agriculture
Oneida	1st	Cornelius Haley*	Dem./Labor	Chairman of Labor and Industries
Oneida	2nd	Harry S. Patten	Democrat	
Oneida	3rd	Chester W. Porter	Republican	
Onondaga	1st	Patrick J. Ryan	Democrat	
Onondaga	2nd	William Kennedy*	Republican	
Onondaga	3rd	Adam C. Listman	Republican	
Ontario		Frank O. Chamberlain*	Republican	
Orange	1st	Howard Thornton	Republican	
Orange	2nd	William E. McCormick	Democrat	
Orleans		Adelbert J. McCormick	Republican	
Oswego	1st	Nevada N. Stranahan*	Republican	
Oswego	2nd	Wilbur H. Selleck*	Republican	
Otsego	1st	Charles Goodell	Democrat	
Otsego	2nd	Walter L. Brown*	Republican	
Putnam		William H. Ladue	Democrat	
Queens	1st	Solomon S. Townsend*	Democrat	Chairman of Internal Affairs
Queens	2nd	George L. Weeks	Republican	contested by James A. McKenna (D)
Rensselaer	1st	James M. Riley*	Democrat	
Rensselaer	2nd	Levi E. Worden*	Republican	
Rensselaer	3rd	John J. Cassin	Democrat	
Richmond		Hubbard R. Yetman	Democrat	Chairman of Affairs of Villages
Rockland		Thomas Finegan	Democrat	
St. Lawrence	1st	George R. Malby*	Republican	
St. Lawrence	2nd	John C. Keeler*	Republican	
St. Lawrence	3rd	Lewis C. Lang	Republican	
Saratoga	1st	Frank L. Smith	Republican	
Saratoga	2nd	Lewis Varney*	Republican	
Schenectady		Alvin J. Quackenbush*	Democrat	
Schoharie		William T. Lamont	Democrat	
Schuyler		William H. Wait	Republican	
Seneca		William H. Kinne	Democrat	
Steuben	1st	Gordon M. Patchin	Republican	
Steuben	2nd	Herman E. Buck	Republican	
Suffolk		James H. Pierson*	Republican	
Sullivan		George M. Beakes*	Democrat	
Tioga		Edward G. Tracy	Republican	
Tompkins		Albert H. Pierson	Republican	
Ulster	1st	George M. Brink*	Republican	
Ulster	2nd	Jacob Rice*	Democrat	Chairman of State Prisons
Ulster	3rd	George H. Bush*	Democrat	Majority Leader; Chairman of Ways and Means
Warren		Howard Conkling	Republican	
Washington	1st	William D. Stevenson*	Republican	
Washington	2nd	William Reid	Republican	
Wayne	1st	George W. Brinkerhoff	Republican	
Wayne	2nd	Flynn Whitcomb	Republican	
Westchester	1st	Thomas K. Fraser	Democrat	
Westchester	2nd	William Ryan*	Democrat	Chairman of Taxation and Retrenchment; on November 8, 1892, elected to the 53rd U.S. Congress
Westchester	3rd	James W. Husted*	Republican	Minority Leader; died on September 25, 1892
Wyoming		Milo H. Olin	Republican	
Yates		Everett Brown*	Republican	

=== Employees ===
- Clerk: Charles R. DeFreest
- Sergeant-at-Arms: Michael B. Redmond
- Doorkeeper: Edward A. Moore
- First Assistant Doorkeeper: Lawrence D. Fitzpatrick
- Second Assistant Doorkeeper: Kenneth D. L. Nivin
- Stenographer: Thomas Hassett

== Sources ==
- The New York Red Book compiled by Will L. Lloyd (published by James B. Lyon, Albany NY, 1892; see pg. 387 for list of senators; pg. 77–103 for senators' bios; pg. 410ff for list of assemblymen; pg. 104–175 for assemblymen's bios; and pg. 406f for senate and assembly committees)
- The New York Red Book compiled by Edgar L. Murlin (published by James B. Lyon, Albany NY, 1897; see pg. 384f for senate districts; and pg. 410–417 for Assembly districts)
- Manual for the Use of the Legislature (1892; pg. 369 and 422ff)
- THE REPUBLICANS WEAKEN in NYT on January 6, 1892
