= George Weeks =

George Weeks may refer to:

- George Weeks (priest) (1868–1941), English Anglican clergyman
- George Weeks (footballer) (1902–1982), English football full back
- George Weeks (politician) (1836–1905), member of the Wisconsin State Assembly
- George Weeks (American football) (1918–1980), American football defensive end
- George E. Weeks (1837–1893), American politician from Maine
- George G. Weeks (1860–1923), American lawyer and politician, speaker of the Maine House of Representatives
- George Henry Weeks (1834–1905), officer in the United States Army
- George L. Weeks, American politician from New York
- George W. Weeks, American film producer

== See also ==
- George Weekes (1869–1953), British academic
