= Morningside Cemetery =

Morningside Cemetery may refer to:

- Morningside Cemetery, Edinburgh, Scotland
- Morningside Cemetery (Malone, New York), United States

== See also ==
- Balmoral Cemetery, Brisbane, in Morningside, Brisbane, Queensland, Australia
- San Fernando Pioneer Memorial Cemetery, formerly Morningside Cemetery, in Los Angeles, California, United States
