= Senator Gallagher =

Senator Gallagher may refer to:

- Frank Gallagher (Brooklyn) (1870–1932), New York State Senate
- John P. Gallagher (1932–2011), New Jersey State Senate
- Owen A. Gallagher (1902–1977), Massachusetts State Senate
- Raymond F. Gallagher (born 1939), New York State Senate
