= Senator Stapleton =

Senator Stapleton may refer to:

- Charles W. Stapleton (1853–1935), New York State Senate
- Corey Stapleton (born 1967), Montana State Senate
- Patrick J. Stapleton Jr. (1924–2001), Pennsylvania State Senate
