= William Lamont =

William Lamont may refer to:

- William C. Lamont (1827–?), American lawyer and politician from New York
- William T. Lamont (1830–1908), American merchant and politician from New York
- William M. Lamont (1934-2018), English historian
- Bill Lamont (1926–1996), Scottish footballer
- Billy Lamont (born 1936), Scottish footballer and manager
