= Isaac Mitchell =

Isaac Mitchell may refer to:

- Isaac Mitchell (writer) (1759–1812), American author and journalist
- Isaac Mitchell (trade unionist) (1867–1952[), Scottish trade unionist.
- Isaac Mitchell (New York politician, born 1835) (1835–1893), American farmer and politician from New York
- Isaac B. Mitchell (1888–1977), American farmer and politician from New York.
