= William R. Hobbie =

American politician (1848–1924)

William Roscoe Hobbie (December 22, 1848 – December 3, 1924) was an American paper manufacturer and politician from New York.

== Life ==
Hobbie was born on December 22, 1848, in Unity, Maine, the son of William H. Hobbie and Sarah Gilkey. He attended Central High School in Cleveland, Ohio. In 1865, he began studying at Amherst College, graduating from there in 1869. He was a member of Alpha Delta Phi. After he graduated, he spent the next three years working as a general agent for New York publisher A. J. Johnson.

In 1872, Hobbie organized the Phoenix Paper Company with Henry L. Mowry and Leonard Haskins moved to Battenville, New York. They built one of the first paper mills in the area, and initially produced brown wrapping paper. The company later switched to producing tissue paper. Hobbie eventually became sole owner of the company, but his son Edward later helped manage the company. He sold the mill in 1922, after over half a century in the paper business.

Hobbie was town supervisor for Greenwich in 1889 and 1890. In 1892, Hobbie was elected to the New York State Assembly as a Republican, representing Washington County. He served in the Assembly in 1893, 1894, 1896, and 1897.

In 1880, Hobbie married Phoebe Walsh. Their children were Phoebe Elizabeth, Edward Walsh, and Marian. He was senior warden of St. Paul's Episcopal Church, president of the board of directors of the Washington County Home for Aged Women, and a Freemason.

In 1922, Hobbie moved to St. Petersburg, Florida. Hobbie died at his home there on December 3, 1924. He was buried in Greenwich.

New York State Assembly
Preceded by District Created	New York State Assembly; Washington County; 1893-1894	Succeeded by William D. Stevenson
Preceded by William D. Stevenson	New York State Assembly; Washington County; 1896-1897	Succeeded by Charles R. Paris
