= William H. Reynolds (New York politician) =

American politician (1868–1931)

William Henry Reynolds

Member of the New York State Senate from the 7th district
- In office January 1, 1894 – December 31, 1895
- Preceded by: Joseph Aspinall
- Succeeded by: Frank Gallagher

Personal details
- Born: February 29, 1868 Brooklyn, New York
- Died: October 13, 1931 (aged 63) Long Beach, New York
- Resting place: Green-Wood Cemetery
- Party: Republican
- Spouse: Elsie Guerrier
- Children: 2

William Henry Reynolds (February 29, 1868 – October 13, 1931) was an American real estate developer and politician from New York.

== Life and career ==
Reynolds was born on February 29, 1868, in Brooklyn, New York, the son of William Reynolds and Margaret McChesney. His father worked as a builder and carpenter.

Reynolds studied law for two years at New York University, but didn't graduate. He initially worked for his father. When he was 18, he opened a real estate broker office and began buying, developing, and selling land in Bedford. He quickly became so successful, his father began working for him. In the early 1890s, he bought at least 80 lots in Prospect Heights previously meant for Prospect Park and turned them into row houses. He also built the Montauk Theatre, rebuilt the Bennett Casino, and helped create Borough Park. He also developed neighborhoods in Bensonhurst and Westminster Heights, built the Jamaica Racetrack, owned several movie theaters (including the Casino Theatre in Manhattan). He opened Dreamland, a Coney Island amusement park, in 1904. The park was destroyed in a terrible fire in 1911.

In 1893, Reynolds was elected to the New York State Senate as a Republican, representing New York's 3rd State Senate district. He served in the State Senate in 1894 and 1895. While in the State Senate, he voted against the consolidation of New York City and Brooklyn.

In 1907, Reynolds went to Long Beach – at the time consisting of a few ramshackle buildings on the sand dunes – and began developing it. In 1914, when Long Beach incorporated as a village, he was elected the first village president. In 1922, when it reincorporated as a city, he was elected as the city's first mayor. He also developed Lido Beach. He served as president of the Lido Realty Corporation, Long Beach on the Ocean, Inc., the Alert Associates, the Livingston Amusement Company, the Blythedale Water Company, the Reylex Corporation, and the Long Beach Railway Company. He was also director of the Long Island Safe Deposit Company.

In August 1917, Reynolds was indicted by a grand jury for committing perjury in 1912, when he served as an expert witness in the condemnation proceedings of Rockaway Park land. He claimed he had no personal interest or ownership in the property, when in fact he held at least 20% of Neponsit Realty Company, which sold the land to New York City for $1,225,000. In October, he was again indicted with three others for conspiring to defraud the city. The indictments were dismissed in 1920.

In May 1924, while serving as mayor of Long Beach, Reynolds was indicted with Long Beach treasurer John Gracy for stealing over $8,000 from the city funds. They were tried and found guilty in June for committing grand larceny and Reynolds was removed from his mayoral office. They were sentenced to six months in the Nassau County jail, but they were permitted to remain free pending their appeal. In June 1925, the appellate court reversed the earlier ruling and ordered a new trial be conducted. The charges were dropped in 1927.

=== Personal life ===
Reynolds was married to Elsie Guerrier. They had two daughters, Mrs. Charles C. Warren and Mrs. Russel O. Ellis. He was a member of the Freemasons and the Elks.

=== Death and legacy ===
Reynolds died at home of heart disease on October 13, 1931. He was buried in Green-Wood Cemetery.

Reynolds Channel – a strait separating the Long Beach Barrier Island from Long Island and Barnum Island – is named in his honor.

== See also ==
- Todd Kaminsky

New York State Senate
Preceded by Joseph Aspinall	New York State Senate; 3rd District; 1894–1895	Succeeded by Frank Gallagher
