= Frank L. Smith (New York politician) =

American farmer and politician

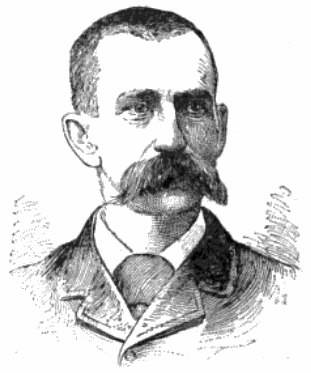

Member of the New York State Assembly
- In office 1892
- Constituency: Saratoga County 1st District

Town supervisor of Galway, New York
- In office 1888–1889

Personal details
- Born: June 26, 1851 Charlton, New York
- Died: October 13, 1926 (aged 75) Ballston Spa, New York
- Party: Republican
- Spouses: Mary E. Feeney (m. 1875; died 1914) Achsah Holbrook (m. 1921)
- Children: 2
- Occupation: Farmer, politician

Frank L. Smith (June 26, 1851 – October 13, 1926) was an American farmer and politician from New York.

== Life ==
Smith was born on June 26, 1851, in Charlton, New York. He attended the Charlton Academy.

Smith worked as a farmer in Charlton. He was a member of the Harmony Association, Patrons of Industry, and the Grange. He was the manager of the Saratoga County Agricultural Society. He served as justice of the peace for eight years, and school commissioner for three terms. In the last fifteen years of his life, he was the manager of the Galway Telephone Company.

Smith served as the town supervisor of Galway in 1888 and 1889. In 1891, Smith was elected to the New York State Assembly as a Republican, representing the Saratoga County 1st District. He served in the Assembly in 1892.

In 1875, Smith married Mary E. Feeney. She died in 1914. In 1921, he married Achsah Holbrook. He had two daughters, Mrs. William Crawford and Mrs. Clinton Palmatier. He was a member of the Charlton Presbyterian church and was superintendent of the Sunday school for thirty years.

Smith died on October 13, 1926. He was buried in Pine Grove Cemetery.

New York State Assembly
Preceded by Cornelius R. Sheffer	New York State Assembly; Saratoga County, 1st District; 1892	Succeeded by District Abolished
