= Joseph J. Cahill =

American politician

Joseph J. Cahill (February 18, 1857 – February 16, 1934) was an American politician from New York.

== Life ==
Cahill was born on February 18, 1857, in Brooklyn, New York, the son of John Cahill and Susan Brackley. His parents were Irish immigrants.

After attending St. Francis Xavier's College in Manhattan, Cahill worked with his father in the produce business and was a member of the Produce Exchange. He later joined the liquor business.

In 1890, Cahill was elected to the New York State Assembly as a Democrat, representing the Kings County 1st District. He served in the Assembly in 1891, 1892, 1893, and 1894.

After he left the Assembly, Cahill had a saloon at 413 Henry Street. In 1905, he was arrested and found guilty of voter registration fraud. After trying to appeal the case for nearly 3 years, he was given a two-year sentence in Sing Sing prison.

Cahill's wife was Margaret Hogan, and they had two sons and two daughters. He died on February 16, 1934, in Frank J. Quayle Jr.'s office at the Hotel St. George. He was buried in Holy Cross Cemetery.

New York State Assembly
Preceded by Hugh A. McTernan	New York State Assembly; Kings County, 1st District; 1891-1892	Succeeded by William J. Plant
Preceded by John J. O'Connor (Brooklyn politician)	New York State Assembly; Kings County, 4th District; 1893-1894	Succeeded by Frank Gallagher (Brooklyn)
