= Allen S. Matthews =

American merchant and politician

Allen S. Matthews (October 19, 1845 – September 14, 1915) was an American merchant and politician from New York.

== Life ==
Matthews was born on October 19, 1845, in Vermont. He attended Fort Covington Academy and Eastman Business College. He came to live in Fort Covington, New York, where he worked as a hardware merchant. He served as town supervisor for three years.

In 1891, while running for the New York State Assembly, Matthews was accused of burning his storehouse when it was practically empty and then attempting to collect insurance money for a large amount of wool he claimed was in the storehouse. The charges were disproved and he won the election to the Assembly. He represented Franklin County as a Republican, and served in the Assembly in 1892, 1893, and 1894.

Matthews died at home on September 14, 1915. He was buried in Elmwood Cemetery.

New York State Assembly
Preceded by William C. Stevens	New York State Assembly; Franklin County; 1892-1894	Succeeded by Thomas A. Sears
