= Mortimer C. Earl =

American politician

- Born: January 12, 1840; Ossining, New York
- Died: October 15, 1917 (aged 77)
- Burial place: Mountain View Cemetery, New Concord; Latitude: 42.3986, Longitude: -73.5253
- Education: Fort Edward Institute
- Employer: Publisher for the Hudson River Chronicle
- Title: Sergeant Major of the 40th New York Infantry (1861-1862), Second Lieutenant of the 40th New York infantry (1862) First Sergeant in the 176th New York Infantry Regiment (1862-1863)
- Term: 1861-1862
- Political party: The Republican Party (1863-1872)
- Other political affiliations: The Democratic Party (1872-1874)
- Spouse: Clarrisa C. Palmer (1864-1917)
- Children: Lucy A. (Daughter) and E. Augusta (Daughter)
- Parents: William Earl (father); Serena Sniffen (mother)

Mortimer C. Earl (January 12, 1840 – October 15, 1917) was an American journalist and politician from New York.

== Early life and education ==
Earl was born on January 12, 1840, near Ossining, New York, the son of William Earl and Serena Sniffen.

Earl attended the Fort Edward Institute.

== Career ==
When he was 19, he started working for the Hudson River Chronicle, later becoming its publisher.

In July 1861, after the American Civil War began, he enlisted in the 40th New York Infantry Regiment and was mustered in as Sergeant Major. The regiment was initially sent to Alexandria, Virginia and guarded it during the First Battle of Bull Run, He was then sent to join George B. McClellan's army. He participated in the Siege of Yorktown and the Battle of Williamsburg.

In May 1862, after the latter battle, he was promoted to Second Lieutenant. He then participated in the Battle of Seven Pines. He accompanied his regiment while retreating through the Seven Days Battles, even though he was suffering from swamp fever.

In July 1862, he was discharged due to his illness.

In December 1862, he re-enlisted as First Sergeant in the 176th New York Infantry Regiment and participated in the Banks expedition to New Orleans.

In April 1863, while stationed in Thibodaux, Louisiana, he was permanently disabled due to a bad fracture in his right ankle bone.

In June 1863, while still crippled, he participated in a skirmish in Thibodaux as a mounted force and fought in the Battle of LaFourche Crossing.

In September 1863, he was honorably discharged due to his disability. While serving in Louisiana, he started a small union paper in Thibodaux and acted as an occasional correspondent of the New York Sunday Mercury.

After his discharge, he moved to Brooklyn, where he was an active Republican until 1872, when he became a Democrat during the Greeley campaign.

In 1874, he became a reporter for the Brooklyn Eagle.

In 1875 and 1876, he acted as secretary to congressman Archibald M. Bliss and was Special Washington Correspondent for the Eagle and the Brooklyn Times.

In 1877, he returned to Brooklyn and worked as a reporter for the Times until 1882.

In 1882, Earl was elected to the New York State Assembly as a Democrat, representing the Kings County 12th District.

He served in the Assembly in 1883, 1884, 1885, and 1891. While in the Assembly, he introduced a bill that exempted Civil War veterans from the civil service examination, which was modified to give them preference and was embodied in the New York State Constitution. He was also the father of a bill that governed the canning and labeling of food in the state, and another that restricted labor hours on railroads. The latter was the first law of its kind enacted.

In 1902, he became Chief Clerk of the Adams Street Police Court, but he lost the position four years later when Republicans took control of the court. He then passed a civil service examination and was appointed assistant clerk under Judge Brenner.

He retired from the position in 1916 due to poor health.

== Personal life ==
For many years, Earl was an active member of the James Methodist Episcopal Church. After he moved to Sunnyside Avenue, he joined the East New York Reformed Church. He was a member of the Grand Army of the Republic and the Royal Arcanum.

In 1864, he married Clarrisa C. Palmer of New Concord. They had two daughters, Lucy A. and E. Augusta.

== Death ==
Earl died at home on October 15, 1917. He was buried in Mountain View Cemetery in New Concord.

New York State Assembly
Preceded by Jaques J. Stillwell	New York State Assembly; Kings County, 12th District; 1883–1885	Succeeded by Richard V. B. Newton
Preceded by Charles J. Kurth	New York State Assembly; Kings County, 12th District; 1891	Succeeded by Charles A. Conrady
