= William H. Ladue =

American politician

William Henry Ladue (December 29, 1843 – August 22, 1903) was an American builder and politician from New York.

== Life ==
Ladue was born on December 29, 1843, in Cold Spring, New York, the son of William A. Ladue and Catherine Jaycox. His great-grandfather was Peter Ladeaux, a French soldier who came to America to fight in the American Revolutionary War and stayed in New York after the war.

Ladue began working as a carpenter in 1859. In 1870, he started his own business and began building a number of residences and stores in Cold Spring and beyond. He was also a director of the National Bank of Cold Spring-on-Hudson, a member of the Board of Water Commissioners, and a fireman.

In 1891, Ladue was elected to the New York State Assembly as a Democrat, representing Putnam County. He served in the Assembly in 1892.

In 1870, Ladue married Alice Greenwood. They had two sons, James G. and William A. He was a member of the Episcopal Church and served as a vestryman of St-Mary's-in-the-Highlands. He was a freemason and a charter member of the Old Homestead Club.

On August 20, 1903, Ladue was seriously injured after being thrown from his wagon. He died from his injuries two days later, on August 22. He was buried in Cold Spring Cemetery.

New York State Assembly
Preceded by Hamilton Fish II	New York State Assembly; Putnam County; 1892	Succeeded by Hamilton Fish II
