= William J. Plant =

Irish-American politician (1847-1905)

William J. Plant (1847 – April 7, 1905) was an Irish-American politician in New York.

== Life ==
Plant was born in 1847 in Ireland. He immigrated to New York in 1848, when he was only one. He and his parents Humphrey and Margaret moved to Brooklyn shortly after immigrating.

After serving in the Navy for a few years, he worked as a shipping clerk for Stafford Ink Company for twenty years.

In 1886, Plant unsuccessfully ran as Brooklyn Supervisor under the United Labor Party. In 1888, he was elected Master Workman of Advance Assembly 1562 of the Knights of Labor.

Plant was elected in 1891 to the New York State Assembly as a Democrat, representing the Kings County 2nd District. He served in the Assembly in 1892, 1893, and 1894.

After he left the Assembly, Plant began work as a contractor. Among his contracts was supplying horses and wagons for the Brooklyn Post Office. He was a member of several societies, including the Royal Arcanum, the Catholic Benevolent Legion, the Knights of Columbus, and the Benevolent and Protective Order of Elks.

His wife was Louisa, who died in 1895. Their children were William, Edward, Humphrey, Mary, Loretta, Margaret, Catherine, and Elizabeth.

Plant died from heart failure on April 7, 1905, in his home on 105 Adams Street. He was buried in Holy Cross Cemetery.

New York State Assembly
Preceded by Bernard J. McBride	New York State Assembly; Kings County, 2nd District; 1892	Succeeded by John Cooney
Preceded by Joseph J. Cahill	New York State Assembly; Kings County, 1st District; 1893-1894	Succeeded by John McKeown (Brooklyn)
