= Harvey J. Donaldson =

American politician

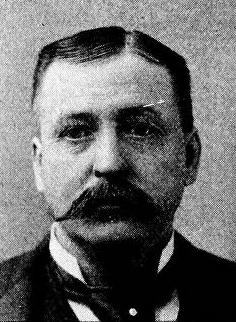
Harvey J. Donaldson (1893)

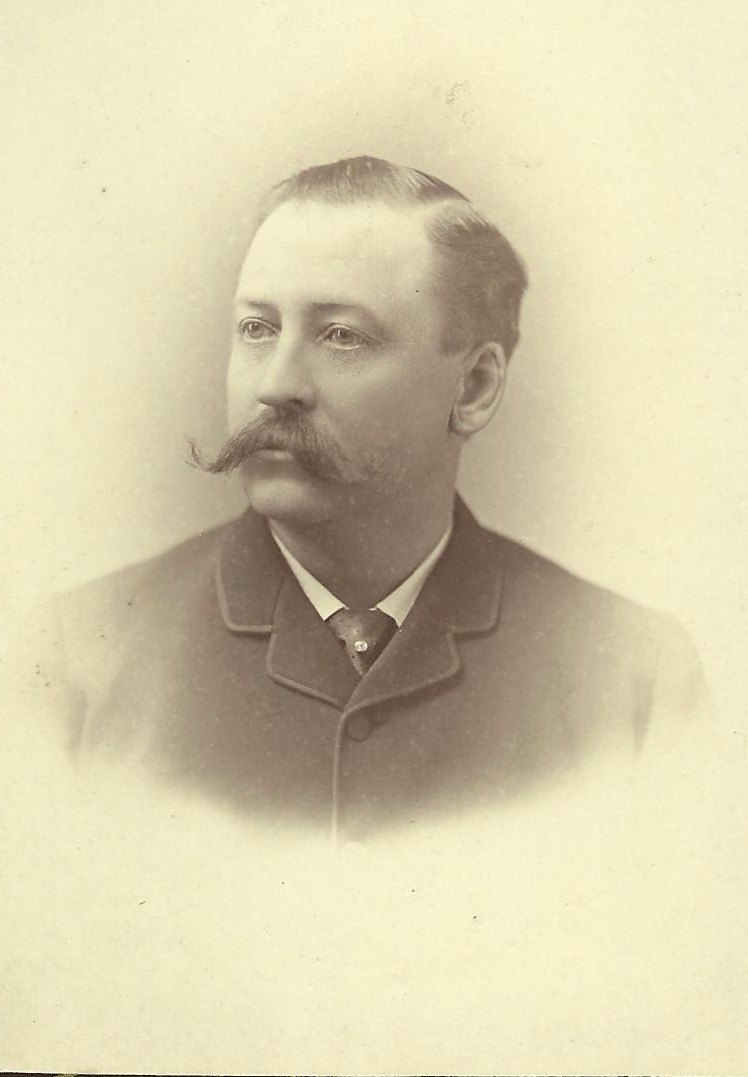
This was a photo in possession of the Zieley family, passed to Mary Zieley's younger brother John D. Zieley, and it was captioned "Harvey J. Donaldson, Saratoga, 1877."

Harvey J. Donaldson (September 15, 1848 – January 2, 1912) was an American manufacturer, banker and politician from New York.

== Life ==
He was born on September 15, 1848, in Argyle, Washington County, New York, the son of Samuel Donaldson (1814–1891) and Jane (Barkley) Donaldson (1814–1894). He attended the common schools, and then became a contractor, and in 1880 a paper manufacturer. Later he also engaged in banking.

He married Mary L. Zieley (1855–1883), but they had no children. After the death of his first wife, he married Martha V. Beattie, and they had one son, Russell Donaldson, who died in infancy. They lived in Ballston Spa, Saratoga County.

He was a member of the New York State Assembly (Saratoga Co., 1st D.) in 1888 and 1889.

He was a member of the New York State Senate from 1890 to 1895, sitting in the 113th, 114th, 115th, 116th (all four 18th D.), 117th and 118th New York State Legislatures (both 20th D.).

In April 1904, he was appointed as a State Canal Appraiser.

He died on January 2, 1912, in Ballston, New York.

== Sources ==
New York State Assembly
Preceded by John H. Burke	New York State Assembly; Saratoga County, 1st District; 1888–1889	Succeeded by Cornelius R. Sheffer
New York State Senate
Preceded by John Foley	New York State Senate; 18th District; 1890–1893	Succeeded by Michael F. Collins
Preceded by George Z. Erwin	New York State Senate; 20th District; 1894–1895	Succeeded by Jacob A. Cantor
