= Charles W. Sutherland =

American newspaper editor and politician

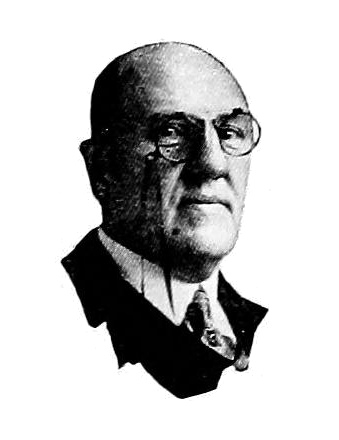
Charles W. Sutherland

Charles Welton Sutherland (March 28, 1860 – December 7, 1943) was an American newspaper editor and politician from New York.

== Life ==
Sutherland was born on March 28, 1860, in Chatham, New York, the son of Delos Sutherland, publisher of the Chatham Courier and other newspapers, and Mariette Curtis.

Sutherland attended the Rochester Free Academy. He initially studied medicine under Dr. George T. Benford, but at an early age he moved to Brooklyn, living at different points in Williamsburg, Stuyvesant, and Flatbush. There, he started writing as a political journalist for The World under Manton Marble. He then became Brooklyn editor of The World, and covered the first inauguration of Grover Cleveland in 1885.

In 1890, Sutherland was elected to the New York State Assembly as a Democrat, representing the Kings County 9th District. He served in the Assembly in 1891. He then served as Assistant Clerk of the New York State Senate in 1892 and 1893.

Sutherland worked for a number of newspapers over the years, mainly in New York City. He was assistant city editor and city editor of the New York Commercial Advertiser and its successor The New York Globe, city editor of the New York Evening Telegram, night editor of the New York American, managing editor of The American, managing editor of The Evening Journal, and an editorial writer of The Evening World. He was an editor of The World for 25 years and worked with The American Weekly for ten years. He also worked as managing editor of The Boston Herald at one point. In the last several years of his life, he lived in Clinton, Connecticut, where three of his children lived.

Sutherland was a founder and president of the Silurians and president of the New York Press Club. He was married to Rose Stillman. Their children were Rand W., Eugene, Floyd R., Renee, and Mrs. Alfred Hall Stevens Jr.

Sutherland died in St. Vincent's Hospital in Manhattan on December 7, 1943. Two years before his death, he wrote his own obituary and submitted it to newspapers in New York City. He was buried in the family plot in Cypress Hills in Brooklyn.

New York State Assembly
Preceded by George Gretsinger	New York State Assembly; Kings County, 9th District; 1891	Succeeded by Lawrence E. Malone
