= Solon S. Laing =

American politician

Solon S. Laing (1847 – November 9, 1911) was an American businessman and politician from New York.

== Life ==
Laing was born in 1847 in East Otto, New York, the son of John Laing. He attended Buffalo Commercial College. In 1870, he began working as a hardware dealer in East Otto, where he lived and worked for the next 18 years. He also worked as a cashier and president of the Bank of Cattaraugus. He was a town supervisor for East Otto in 1884, 1885, 1889, and 1890, and served as a member and chairman of the Democratic County Committee. He also worked as postmaster of East Otto.

In 1891, Laing was elected to the New York State Assembly as a Democrat, representing the Cattaraugus County 2nd District. He served in the Assembly in 1892. In 1892, he moved to Salamanca, where he was a member of the hardware dealer firm Laing & Andrews. He moved back to East Otto after a few years.

In 1870, Laing married Martha D. Eddy of Mansfield. They had two children, John Laing and Mrs. G. W. Butterfield.

Laing died at home on November 9, 1911. He was buried in East Otto Cemetery.

New York State Assembly
Preceded by James S. Whipple	New York State Assembly; Cattaraugus County, 2nd District; 1892	Succeeded by District Abolished
