= Adam C. Listman =

American politician

Adam C. Listman (July 1, 1859 – February 24, 1943) was an American clothing cutter and politician from New York.

== Life ==
Listman was born on July 1, 1859, in Syracuse, New York. His father, Adam Litman, was a German immigrant who worked as a hotel keeper, contractor, salt manufacturer, grocery dealer, and an alderman.

After attending Prescott School, Listman initially worked as a drug store clerk. From 1881 to 1882, he lived in Baltimore, Maryland. He largely worked as a clothing cutter, and was a founder and president of the clothing cutters' organization of Syracuse. He was also in the restaurant business at one point.

In 1891, Listman was elected to the New York State Assembly as a Republican, representing the Onondaga County 3rd District. He served in the Assembly in 1892. In February 1922, he was appointed Deputy U. S. Marshall for the Northern New York District. He also served as a Deputy Sheriff for Sheriffs John Schlosser and Edward Ten Eyek.

In 1881, while living in Baltimore, Listman married Martha W. Bowling. They had two children, Harry A. and Martha W. He was a member of the Syracuse Turn Verin, and served as a captain of the Sons of Union Veterans of the Civil War and its aide-de-camp for the state of New York.

Listman died at home on February 24, 1943. He was buried in Woodlawn Cemetery.

New York State Assembly
Preceded by Ignatius Sawmiller	New York State Assembly; Onondaga County, 3rd District; 1892	Succeeded by William H. Hotaling
