= Lawrence E. Malone =

American lawyer and politician

Lawrence Edward Malone (September 1, 1862 – August 23, 1944) was an American lawyer and politician from New York.

== Life ==
Lawrence was born on September 1, 1862, in Williamsburg, Brooklyn, New York. He was the son of Irish immigrants Dr. Lawrence E. Malone. His sister was suffragette and labor leader Maud Malone, and his uncle was Rev. Sylvester Malone. His brother Sylvester and sister Marcella also became lawyers.

Lawrence attended St. Francis Xavier's College and Columbia Law School. One of his classmates in Columbia was Charles Evans Hughes. He was later part of the law firm S. L. and L. E. Malone.

A Republican, Lawrence was elected in 1891 to the New York State Assembly, representing the Kings County 9th District. He served in the Assembly 1892.

In 1896, Lawrence became an attorney for the Lawyers Title Insurance Co. In 1913, he moved to Jamaica, Queens, to work for the Lawyers Title and Trust Co. In 1933, he joined the Home Owners' Loan Corporation.

Lawrence died in his Richmond Hill home on August 23, 1944. He was buried in Cypress Hills Cemetery.

New York State Assembly
Preceded by Charles W. Sutherland	New York State Assembly; Kings County, 9th District; 1892	Succeeded by John Kelly
