= Charles A. Conrady =

American judge and politician

- Born: Charles August Conrady; October 9, 1853; Brooklyn, New York, US
- Died: March 16, 1919 (aged 65); Bushwick Hospital, Brooklyn
- Resting place: Evergreens Cemetery, Brooklyn
- Occupations: judge, politician
- Known for: New Utrecht Judge, New York State Assembly (1892,1907)

Charles August Conrady (October 9, 1853 – March 16, 1919) was an American judge and politician from New York.

== Life ==
Charles was born on October 9, 1853, in the old 25th Ward of Brooklyn, New York. He was the son of John Peter Conrady (1809-1893) and Madeline Schneider (1811-1888), German immigrants from the Duchy of Nassau.

Charles initially worked as a coach maker and carriage painter. In 1878, he was appointed to be assistant keeper of the Municipal Building. He later moved to Bath Beach and was elected three times as justice of the peace in New Utrecht, twice as justice of the Court of Special Sessions (later the County Court), making him the first Republican judge elected in the town.

In 1891, Charles was elected to the New York State Assembly, where he represented the Kings County 12th District. He served in the Assembly in 1892. He was then appointed Chief Deputy Collector of Internal Revenue for the Brooklyn 2nd District in 1893, followed by four years as chief clerk of the Third District Municipal Court.

Charles was elected back to the State Assembly in 1906, this time representing the Kings County 16th District. He served in 1907.

Charles died on March 16, 1919, in Bushwick Hospital following an operation. He is buried in Evergreens Cemetery.

New York State Assembly
Preceded by Mortimer C. Earl	New York State Assembly; Kings County, 12th District; 1892	Succeeded by Louis C. Ott
Preceded by Charles J. Weber	New York State Assembly; Kings County, 16th District; 1907	Succeeded by Michael J. Grady
