= John A. Hennessy =

American politician

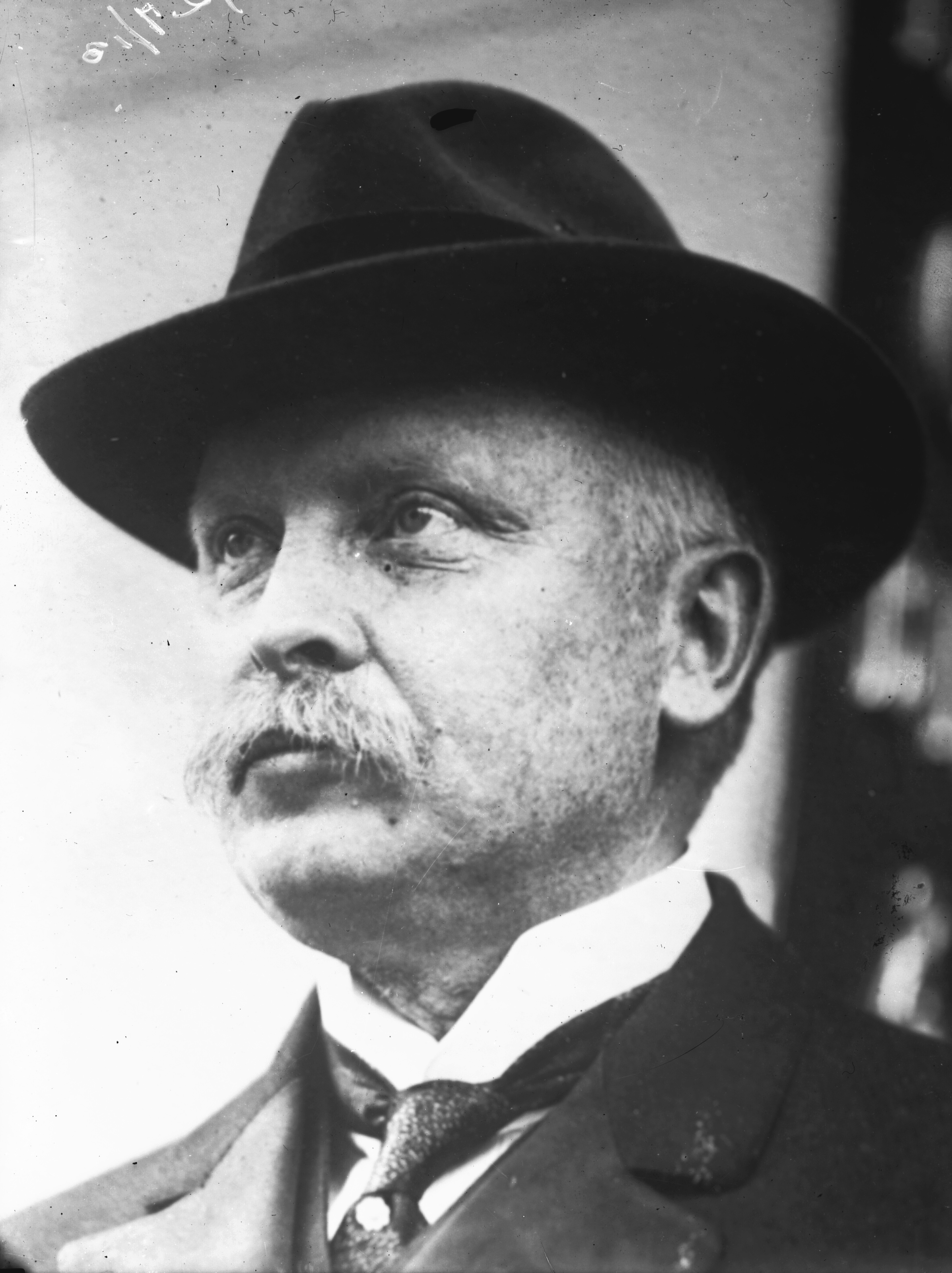
John A. Hennessy

John A. Hennessy (1859 - April 22, 1951), was a newspaper editor and a special investigator for Governor Sulzer in the Tammany Hall corruption trial of 1913.

== Biography ==
He was a member of the New York State Assembly in 1893 (Kings Co., 8th D.), 1894 and 1895 (both Kings Co., 2nd D.).

He died on April 22, 1951, in Brooklyn.

New York State Assembly
Preceded by James F. Quigley	New York State Assembly; Kings County, 8th District; 1893	Succeeded by John J. Cain
Preceded by John Cooney	New York State Assembly; Kings County, 2nd District; 1894–1895	Succeeded by John McKeown
