= Flynn Whitcomb =

American farmer and politician

Flynn Whitcomb (December 20, 1833 – June 14, 1911) was an American farmer and politician from New York.

== Life ==
Whitcomb was born on December 20, 1833, in Granville, New York. His parents were Samuel Whitcomb, a preacher for the Methodist Episcopal Church, and Selinda Smith. Whitcomb moved to Walworth as an infant. In 1838, he moved to Ontario, New York.

After attending school, Whitcomb learned the carpenter trade. He spent most of his life working as a farmer, with his own 87 acre farm. He also was involved in fruit raising. He married Mary A. Clark of Williamson in 1854.

Whitcomb was Collector and Excise Commissioner for Ontario. In 1891, he was elected to the New York State Assembly as a Republican, representing the Wayne County 2nd District. He served in the Assembly in 1892.

Whitcomb died at home on June 14, 1911.

New York State Assembly
Preceded by Richard P. Groat	New York State Assembly; Wayne County, 2nd District; 1892	Succeeded by District Abolished
