= John Cooney (politician) =

American politician

John Cooney (June 9, 1836 – January 20, 1894) was an American lawyer and politician from New York.

== Life ==
Cooney was born on June 9, 1836, in Albany, New York. He was of Irish descent.

Cooney attended The Albany Academy. He moved to Brooklyn in 1855 and was admitted to the bar two years later. He studied law under James T. Brady and defended a large number of murder cases.

A Democrat, Cooney was elected in 1889 to the New York State Assembly, representing the Kings County 3rd District. He served in the Assembly in 1890, 1891, 1892, and 1893.

He was an elected delegate to the 1894 New York Constitutional Convention, but he died before the convention.

Cooney died of pneumonia on January 20, 1894, in his home at 189 Dean Street. He was in poor health for at least a year beforehand. He was buried in Holy Cross Cemetery.

New York State Assembly
Preceded by Peter K. McCann	New York State Assembly; Kings County, 3rd District; 1890-1892	Succeeded by John J. O'Connor
Preceded by William J. Plant	New York State Assembly; Kings County, 2nd District; 1893	Succeeded by John A. Hennessy
