= Chester W. Porter =

American farmer, cheese manufacturer and politician

Chester Winfield Porter (September 3, 1861 – August 30, 1911) was an American farmer, cheese manufacturer, and politician from New York.

== Life ==
Porter was born on September 3, 1861, in Western, New York. He was the son of Joel Porter, a farmer and cheese manufacturer, and Ann A. French. He attended Syracuse Classical School.

In 1880, Porter began attending Syracuse University. He was a member of Psi Upsilon. He graduated with a B.S. in 1884. After he graduated, he returned to his father's farm in North Western and worked with him in agriculture and cheese manufacturing. He was a member of the Farmers' League and the Utica Board of Trade.

In 1891, Porter was elected to the New York State Assembly as a Republican, representing the Oneida County 3rd District. He served in the Assembly in 1892 and 1893. In 1897, he was appointed superintendent of the Black River Canal, but he resigned shortly afterwards for health reasons. In 1910, he was appointed assistant commissioner of jurors of Oneida County, an office he held until his death.

Porter was a member of the First Methodist Episcopal Church of Western. He was also a member of the Independent Order of Odd Fellows.

Porter moved to Rome in 1908. Porter died at his home there on August 30, 1911. He was buried in Carmichael Hill Cemetery in Western.

New York State Assembly
Preceded by Russell S. Johnson	New York State Assembly; Oneida County, 3rd District; 1892	Succeeded by District Abolished
Preceded by Harry S. Patten	New York State Assembly; Oneida County, 2nd District; 1893	Succeeded by Joseph Porter (New York politician)
