= Maud Malone =

American suffragist and librarian

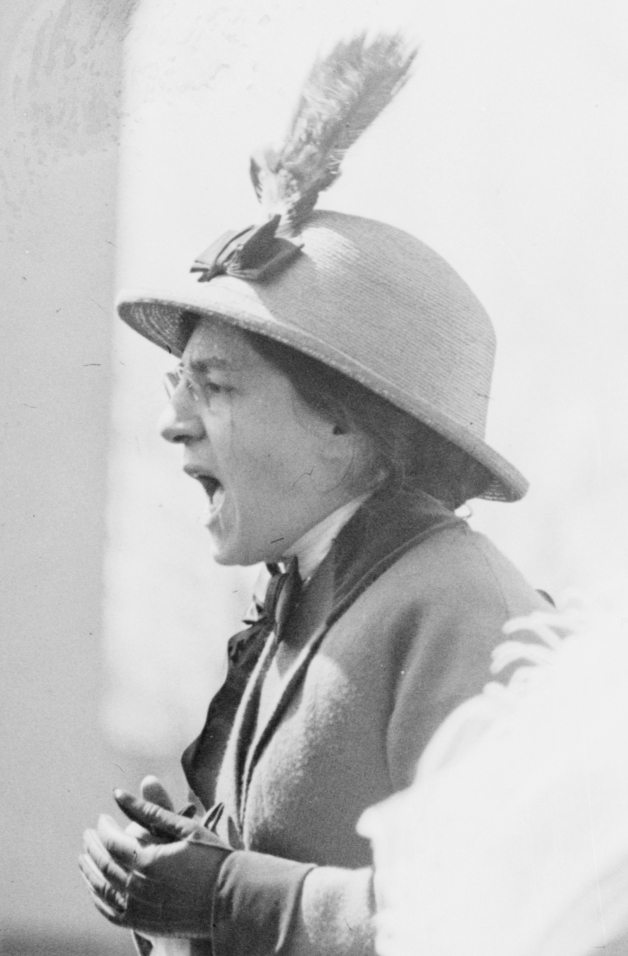
- Malone in 1914
- Born: 1873; New York City
- Died: 1951 (aged 78)
- Occupation: Librarian

Maud Malone (1873 – 1951), also seen as Maude Malone, was an American librarian and "militant suffragette" based in New York. She was also a spokesperson for the Library Employees' Union, the first labor union for public library workers in the United States.

== Early life ==
Maud Malone was born in New York City, to Irish immigrant parents, Annie Malone and Edward Malone. Her father was a doctor, her uncle Sylvester Malone was a priest, and both men were among the founders of the New York Anti-Poverty Society. Her sister Marcella Malone and her brothers Lawrence and Sylvester Malone all became lawyers.

== Career ==
Malone was active as a suffragist in New York City. She was president of the Harlem Equal Rights League when she organized an outdoor suffrage meeting in 1908. "It was in the broadest spirit of democracy that we went out into the streets inviting all passersby to listen to listen to our arguments and offer their objections or ask questions," Malone wrote of the event. In March 1908, she quit the Progressive Woman's Union in protest against their concerns for attracting a "well-dressed crowd". In 1909, she wore a large yellow sign advocating suffrage, on a solo march from Cooper Union, up Broadway, and along Fifth Avenue.

One of her visible acts of protest was as "heckler", especially at presidential candidate speeches in 1912, when she was known to shout "What about woman suffrage?" from the audience. She was often ejected for this act, fined, and at least once convicted of creating a disturbance at a public meeting, and given a suspended sentence. In 1917 she picketed the White House as part of the Silent Sentinels in a campaign to get the Democratic Party to endorse women's suffrage. She was arrested and sentenced to 60 days at the Occoquan Workhouse, where she was among the eleven women who unsuccessfully requested political prisoner status.

Maud Malone worked for the New York Public Library and was a founding member of the Library Employees' Union in 1917. She was the organization's spokesperson; her sister Marcella Malone served a term as the union's president. After many years of outspoken union activity, she was dismissed from her job at the New York Public Library in 1932. Later in life she worked as librarian for the newspaper The Daily Worker.

== Personal life ==
Maud Malone died in 1951, aged 78 years.
