= George Asher Stevens =

American politician

George Asher Stevens (June 7, 1856 – September 17, 1920) was an American hotel manager and politician from New York.

== Life ==
Stevens was born on June 7, 1856, in Black Brook, New York, the son of lumberman Curtis Stevens and Lucy Sherman.

After Stevens' father died when he was seven, he moved with his mother and siblings to the Saranac River. When he was twelve, he moved to Au Sable Forks, where he worked on a farm in the summer and attended school in the winter. When he was fourteen, he began working at his step-father's hotel in Franklin Falls. Three years later, he took a job as a traveling salesman for the Isham Wagon Company of Plattsburg. For the next two years, he traveled across New York and New England for that job.

While hunting with his brother John, a machinist, Stevens camped on the site of the future Loom Lake House and decided to enter the hotel business with his brother. The two broke camp and found a Mr. Nash wanted to sell the Excelsior House in Lake Placid. In 1877, they bought the hotel with financial help from some friends and renamed it the Stevens House. Initially, John ran it on his own while Stevens took a business course. In 1880, the two brothers began running it together. In 1905, John retired and Stevens became the sole proprietor of the hotel until his death. The hotel consisted of 500 acres of land. He was a member of the executive committee of the New York State Hotel Men's Association and president of the Bank of Lake Placid from its organization until his death. He was also First Vice-President of the Adirondack Hotel League and President of the Shore Owners' Association.

Stevens was town supervisor from 1875 to 1876. In 1892, he was elected to the New York State Assembly as a Republican, representing Essex County. He served in the Assembly in 1893 and 1894. In the Assembly, he presented bills for the improvement of highways through Essex County and the Adirondack Park. He also introduced a large number of bills related to the Adirondacks, including one to settle a dispute between the State and claimants of state-owned land, another to appropriate a million dollars to purchase Adirondack land for a state park, and a third to provide the redemption of land held by the State under a tax title. He was a presidential elector in the 1904 presidential election.

Stevens was a member of the Freemasons. He was an Episcopalian. In 1887, he married Frances J. Flanders. Their children were Apollos, J. Hubert, Raymond Flanders, and Curtis Palmer.

Stevens died at home from heart disease on September 17, 1920. He was buried in Riverside Cemetery in Au Sable Forks.

New York State Assembly
Preceded by Walter D. Palmer	New York State Assembly; Essex County; 1893–1894	Succeeded by Albert Weed
