= Charles T. Dunning =

Former Clerk of New York State Senate

Charles T. Dunning (November 2, 1843 – May 14, 1916) was a former Clerk of the New York State Senate.

== Life ==
Dunning was born on November 2, 1843, in Minisink, New York. He was the son of Braddock R. Dunning, a cooper and farmer, and Harriet L. Walsh.

Growing up in Unionville, Dunning attended public school in Middletown. He then moved to Jersey City, New Jersey, where he clerked for a store. In 1867, he moved to Goshen with his father. In 1872, he was made Clerk of the Orange County Board of Supervisors, a position he would serve in for the next 17 years. He was an active member of the Democratic Party.

In 1892, Dunning was appointed Clerk of the New York State Senate. He served as Clerk in 1892 and 1893.

Dunning's first wife, Georgia Thompson, died in 1888. His second wife was Mary E. Millspaugh.

Dunning died at home on May 14, 1916. He was buried in Wallkill Cemetery.

Government offices
Preceded by John Snyders Kenyon	Clerk of the New York State Senate; 1892-1893	Succeeded by John Snyders Kenyon
