= Martin L. Willard =

American politician

Martin Louis Willard (February 21, 1842 – January 1, 1921) was an American politician from New York.

== Life ==
Willard was born on February 21, 1842, in Antwerp, New York, to Otis Willard (1807-1893) and Jerusha Ellis (1807-1868). He was brought up on a farm, and attended Ives Seminary and Eastman's Commercial College.

In June 1861, during the American Civil War, Willard enlisted in the 35th New York Volunteer Infantry Regiment as a private in Company C. He was wounded in August 1862, during the Second Battle of Bull Run. He was mustered out with his company in June 1863. In August 1864, he re-enlisted in the 186th New York Volunteer Infantry Regiment, and was mustered in as a private in Company D in September. He was promoted to first sergeant, and was mustered out in June 1865.

Willard worked as superintendent of the Alpine Iron and Furnace Company in Antwerp. He later served as street commissioner and deputy sheriff. From 1885 to 1891, he was postmaster of Antwerp. After his term as postmaster expired, he became superintendent of cells in Auburn State Prison.

In 1891, Willard was elected to the New York State Assembly as a Democrat, representing the Jefferson County 2nd District. He served in the Assembly in 1892. He passed a civil service examination in December 1892, and in January 1893 he was appointed a clerk in the office of the Adjutant General of New York Josiah Porter. In 1895, he was removed from office by the newly elected Republican administration. In 1896, he moved to Brooklyn, where he worked in the insurance and relief department of the Brooklyn Rapid Transit Company. He lived in Brooklyn for the rest of his life.

In 1864, Willard married Frank Ellen Green. They had a son, Charles Otis. They also had an adopted daughter, Lois Annis Willard. Willard was a freemason, and a member of the Grand Army of the Republic, the Independent Order of Odd Fellows, the Knights of Labor, and the Masonic Veterans' Association of Brooklyn.

Willard died at home on January 1, 1921. He was buried in the Hillside Cemetery in Antwerp.

== Family ==
Martin Louis Willard was a 5th great-grandson (8th generation descendant) of Simon Willard (1605–1676), a Massachusetts colonist.

New York State Assembly
Preceded by Isaac Mitchell	New York State Assembly; Jefferson County, 2nd District; 1892	Succeeded by District Abolished
