= Walter D. Palmer =

American politician

Walter Daniel Palmer (January 18, 1850 – November 18, 1894) was an American politician from New York.

== Life ==
Palmer was born in Charlotte, Vermont on January 18, 1850. He graduated from Eastman Business College in Poughkeepsie, New York in 1868. He worked in the mercantile business until 1874, and later served as secretary and treasurer of the Essex Nail Company. He served as postmaster of Essex, New York from 1875 to 1884. He was also town clerk for two terms and represented Essex as town supervisor for several years, at one point serving as chairman on the board of supervisors.

In 1890, Palmer was elected to the New York State Assembly as a Republican, representing Essex County. He served in the Assembly in 1891 and 1892.

He had a son Guy Palmer who died in a boat accident at the age of thirteen in March 1892.

Palmer died in Buffalo on November 18, 1894 and is buried in the Essex Cemetery.

New York State Assembly
Preceded by Thomas J. Treadway	New York State Assembly; Essex County; 1891-1892	Succeeded by George Asher Stevens
