= Jacob Rice (New York politician) =

American politician

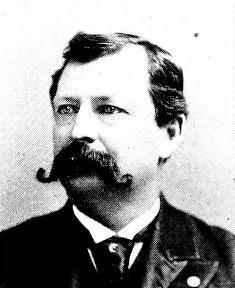
Jacob Rice (1893)

Jacob Rice (March 7, 1847 Trier, Rhine Province, Kingdom of Prussia – July 1930 Kingston, Ulster County, New York) was an American politician from New York.

== Life ==
The family emigrated to United States in 1849, and settled four years later in Rondout, New York. He attended the public schools. During the American Civil War, he fought with the 192nd New York Volunteers. After the war, he engaged in the manufacture of furniture, and later in freight forwarding, contracting, and boat building. In 1877, he married Sophie Derrenbacher (died 1941), and they had ten children.

Rice was Coroner of Ulster County from 1882 to 1885.

He was a member of the New York State Assembly in 1889, 1890, 1891, 1892 (all four Ulster Co., 2nd D.) and 1893 (Ulster Co., 1st D.).

He was a member of the New York State Senate in 1894 and 1895 (both 17th D.); and in 1899 and 1900 (both 25th D.). He was a delegate to the 1900 Democratic National Convention.

He died in July 1930 at his home in Kingston, New York, and was buried at the St. Peter's Cemetery there.

== Sources ==
- The New York Red Book compiled by Edgar L. Murlin (published by James B. Lyon, Albany NY, 1897; pg. 404 and 507–510)
- Sketches of the members of the Legislature in The Evening Journal Almanac (1895; pg. 50)
- The History of Ulster County, New York by Alphonso D. Clearwater (1907 re-published 2001; pg. 666)

New York State Assembly
Preceded by John J. O'Reilly	New York State Assembly; Ulster County, 2nd District; 1889–1892	Succeeded by James Lounsbery
Preceded by George M. Brink	New York State Assembly; Ulster County, 1st District; 1893	Succeeded by Henry McNamee
New York State Senate
Preceded by Amasa J. Parker, Jr.	New York State Senate; 17th District; 1894–1895	Succeeded by Charles B. Page
Preceded by Charles Davis	New York State Senate; 25th District; 1899–1900	Succeeded by William S. C. Wiley
