= William C. Stevens (New York politician) =

American politician

William Cullen Stevens (August 29, 1848 – October 2, 1897) was an American merchant and politician from New York.

== Life ==
Stevens was born on August 29, 1848, in Moira New York, the son of Simon Dwight Stevens and Susan Burdick. His brother was newspaper publisher and assemblyman Halbert D. Stevens.

Stevens moved with his parents to Bangor, Maine, when he was a few months old, later returning to Moira. At a young age, he started working as a store clerk in Moira. He then worked as a traveling salesman. He then became a commercial traveller for the wholesale crockery house Abram, French & Co. In 1874, he moved to Malone, became the senior member of the firm Stevens, Bowen & Co, and opened a hardware store. He later formed a new partnership with W. F. Symonds and opened a dry goods store. He disposed of his interest in 1889, when he was elected to the Assembly.

Stevens was a trustee of the village of Malone. In 1888, he was elected to the New York State Assembly as a Republican, representing Franklin County. He served in the Assembly in 1889, 1890, and 1891. While in the Assembly, he obtained appropriations for the Northern New York Institute for Deaf Mutes, which he helped found and took a deep interest in. He then worked as the financial clerk in the Assembly in 1894, 1895, 1896, and 1897. In between Assembly sessions as financial clerk, he worked as a salesman for the Lawrence-Webter Company of Malone.

Stevens was a member of the Methodist Episcopal Church. In 1873, he married the eldest daughter of Wallace H. Webster. Their children were Mabel, Jennie, Susie, and Wallace H.

Stevens died at home from heart failure on October 2, 1897, the day after he was appointed chairman of the Republican county committee. He was buried in Morningside Cemetery in Malone.

New York State Assembly
Preceded by Floyd J. Hadley	New York State Assembly; Franklin County; 1889–1891	Succeeded by Allen S. Matthews
