= Patrick J. Ryan (New York judge) =

American politician

Member of the New York State Assembly from the 1st district
- In office 1892–1892
- Preceded by: Howard G. White
- Succeeded by: Duncan W. Peck

Personal details
- Born: January 19, 1861
- Died: February 29, 1940 (aged 79)
- Party: Democratic

Patrick J. Ryan (January 19, 1861 – February 29, 1940) was an American lawyer, politician, and judge from New York.

== Life ==
Ryan was born on January 19, 1861, in LaFayette, New York, the son of Irish immigrant Martin Ryan and Margaret Burke. In 1867, the family moved to Pompey. After graduating from the Pompey Academy at 17, he spent the next two years teaching in Pompey.

In 1884, Ryan graduated at the top of his class at St. Bonaventure University in Allegany. He then moved to Syracuse, where he studied law in the law offices of Goodelle & Nottingham and George W. and Michael E. Driscoll. He was admitted to the bar in 1886.

In 1891, Ryan was elected to the New York State Assembly as a Democrat, representing the Onondaga County 1st District. He served in the Assembly in 1892. While in the Assembly, he introduced a bill that created the Syracuse Municipal Court. Upon the court's creation in 1893, Governor Roswell P. Flower appointed him as a judge. He served on the Municipal Court for the next 47 years, longer than any other judge in Syracuse, and was still serving as judge when he died.

Ryan was a member of the Catholic Mutual Benefit Association, the Catholic Business League, and the Citizens' Club. His children were Charles, Alfred, George, Alice, and Mrs. M. J. Clarey.

Ryan died from a stroke at St. Joseph's Hospital on February 29, 1940. He was buried in St. Agnes Cemetery.

New York State Assembly
Preceded by Howard G. White	New York State Assembly; Onondaga County, 1st District; 1892	Succeeded by Duncan W. Peck
