= Charles Goodell (born 1853) =

American politician

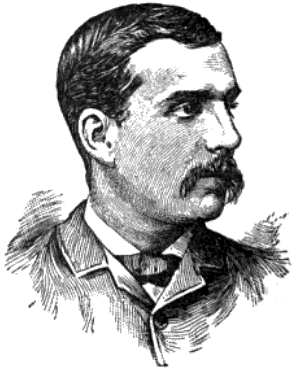

Member of the New York State Assembly
- In office 1892
- Constituency: Otsego County, 1st District

Personal details
- Born: May 11, 1853 Decatur, New York
- Died: October 13, 1940 (aged 87) West Palm Beach, Florida
- Party: Democratic
- Occupation: Farmer, politician

Charles Goodell (May 11, 1853 – October 13, 1940) was an American farmer and politician from New York.

== Life ==
Goodell was born on May 11, 1853, in Decatur, New York. Once he reached his majority, he was elected Town Clerk. He then served as town supervisor in 1879, 1880, and 1881. In 1885, he moved to Worcester, where he was appointed, and then elected, justice of the peace. He was a farmer and a dealer in hops, butter, and other farm produce.

In 1891, he was elected to the New York State Assembly as a Democrat, representing the Otsego County 1st District. He served in the Assembly in 1892.

Goodell was a member of the Methodist church. He was a freemason and a member of The Elks and the Woodmen of the World.

In 1935, Goodell moved to West Palm Beach, Florida. He died there on October 13, 1940. He was buried in Maple Grove Cemetery in Worcester.

New York State Assembly
Preceded by Oscar F. Lane	New York State Assembly; Otsego County, 1st District; 1892	Succeeded by District Abolished
