= Harry S. Patten =

American politician

Harry Sherburn Patten (August 9, 1860 – June 5, 1931) was an American lawyer and politician from New York.

== Life ==
Patten was born on August 9, 1860, in Tyrone, New York. He attended the Utica Free Academy. He worked as a farmer for a time.

In 1884, after studying law in the law office of W. and N. E. Kernan, Patten passed the bar. From 1885 to 1888 he worked as clerk of the city court of Utica. He later established his own law office. He was a member of Whitestown Board of Health and Commissioner of the U.S. Deposit Fund of Oneida County. He lived in Whitesboro. He was also head of the Whitestown Water Works Company.

In 1891, Patten was elected to the New York State Assembly as a Democrat, representing the Oneida County 2nd District. He served in the Assembly in 1892. After his term in the Assembly, he was appointed Oneida County loan commissioner.

In 1880, Patten married Effie L. Combs of Utica. Their children were Elizabeth, Mrs. W. F. Waterbury, Mrs. C. W. Clarke, Mrs. H. B. Boyle.

Patten died at home on June 5, 1931.

New York State Assembly
Preceded by James L. Dempsey	New York State Assembly; Oneida County, 2nd District; 1892	Succeeded by Chester W. Porter
