= George M. Brink =

American politician

George M. Brink (March 19, 1848 – June 6, 1905) was an American politician from Kingston, New York.

== Life ==
Brink was born in Kingston, New York on March 19, 1848. He was the son of Adam Brink.

In 1863, during the American Civil War, Brink enlisted in the 80th New York Volunteer Infantry Regiment as a musician. After the War, he returned to Kingston and became a cigar maker. In 1875, he opened his own store and became a tobacco and cigar dealer.

In 1890, Brink was elected to the New York State Assembly as a Republican, representing Ulster County, 1st District. He served in the Assembly in 1891 and 1892.

In 1894 and 1895, Brink was an excise commissioner of Kingston and alms commissioner for the Ninth Ward. In 1898 and 1899, he was supervisor for the Third department of Kingston. In 1898, he was appointed postmaster by President McKinley. He was in the National Guard for 14 years, serving as a lieutenant.

Brink married Ida E. Houghtaling in 1872. They had four daughters, Grace, Edna T., Mary M. V., and Ida T. He was a freemason, a Knight of Pythias, a member of the Independent Order of Odd Fellows, and commander of the Pratt Post, the Grand Army of the Republic. He was connected with the Kingston Fire Department since 1866.

Brink hanged himself in his barn on June 6, 1905. He was buried in Wiltwyck Cemetery.

New York State Assembly
Preceded by James H. Everett	New York State Assembly; Ulster County, 1st District; 1891-1892	Succeeded by Jacob Rice (New York politician)
