= John Snyders Kenyon =

American politician

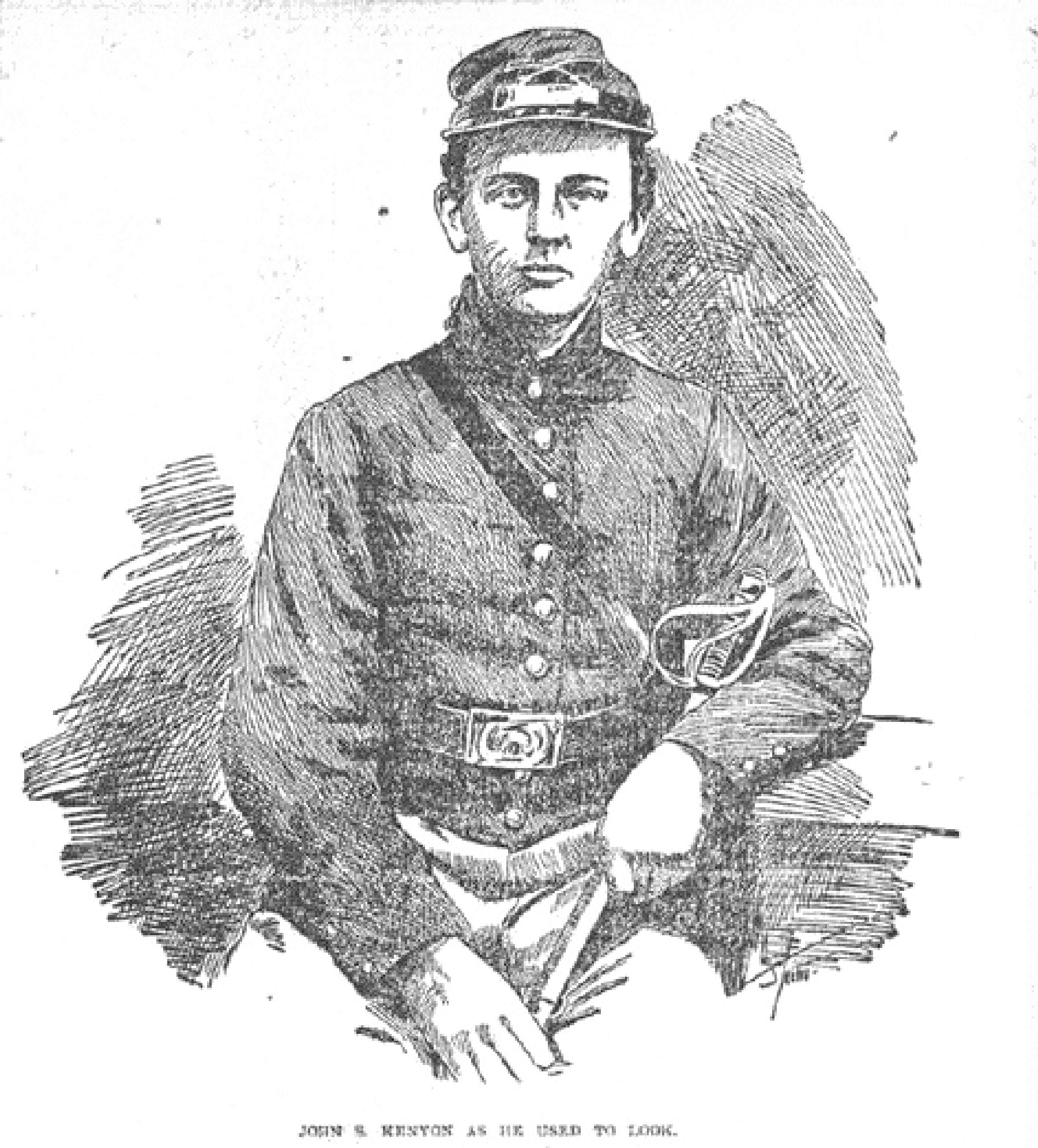
- Drawing from c. 1865

Clerk of the New York State Senate
- In office 1888–1891
- Preceded by: John W. Vrooman
- Succeeded by: Charles T. Dunning

Clerk of the New York State Senate
- In office 1894–1897
- Preceded by: Charles T. Dunning
- Succeeded by: James S. Whipple

Personal details
- Born: May 5, 1843 Grosvenors Corners, Schoharie County, New York, U.S.
- Died: February 16, 1902 (aged 58)
- Cause of death: Appendicitis
- Resting place: Oakwood Cemetery, Syracuse, New York
- Party: Republican

Military service
- Allegiance: Union
- Branch/service: Union Army
- Years of service: 1861-1865
- Unit: 3rd New York Volunteer Cavalry
- Awards: Medal of Honor

John Snyders Kenyon (May 5, 1843 – February 16, 1902) was an American politician and Medal of Honor recipient from New York.

== Life ==
Kenyon was born on May 5, 1843, in Grosvenors Corners, Schoharie County, New York. His parents were Charles Grosvenor Kenyon and Helen Snyder. He was beginning to study law when the American Civil War broke out.

Kenyon enlisted in the 3rd New York Volunteer Cavalry in October 1861 and was mustered in as a private in Company D. By December 1862, he was promoted to second lieutenant. He was mustered out as supernumerary in May 1863, but he re-enlisted as a private in Company H in January 1864. He was promoted to corporal in December 1864. He was mustered out in July 1865. On May 15, 1862, his regiment was fighting Confederates along the Trent River in North Carolina when they were ordered to retreat. When a man from his company fell, Kenyon turned and galloped towards the injured soldier. Under fire from Confederates, he dismounted, put the man on his horse, and ran beside him until they made it back to their unit. In 1897, he was awarded a Medal of Honor for his action.

After the war, Kenyon moved to Baldwinsville, where he worked in the flour and paper milling business. In around 1876, he moved to Syracuse. He was originally a member of the Democratic Party, but he became a Republican shortly after moving to Syracuse. He served as secretary and chairman of the Onondoga County Republican General Committee and as secretary of the New York Republican State Committee.

In 1874, Kenyon was appointed Canal Superintendent of the Oswego Canal. He was appointed Deputy Clerk of the New York State Assembly in 1877. He served as Assistant Clerk of the New York State Senate in 1881, 1882, 1886, and 1887. In 1882 and 1883, he was the Reading Clerk of the United States House of Representatives. He served as Clerk of the New York State Senate in 1888, 1889, 1890, 1891, 1894, 1895, 1896, and 1897. In 1898, he resigned to serve as secretary of the New York State Board of Railroad Commissioners.

He was a member of the Grand Army of the Republic, the Military Order of the Loyal Legion, and the Medal of Honor Society. He was married to Martha Tefft. They had one daughter, Alma.

Kenyon died at home from appendicitis on February 16, 1902. He was buried in Oakwood Cemetery in Syracuse.

== Medal of Honor citation ==
The President of the United States of America, in the name of Congress, takes pleasure in presenting the Medal of Honor to Sergeant John Snyders Kenyon, United States Army, for extraordinary heroism on 15 May 1862, while serving with Company D, 3d New York Cavalry, in action at Trenton, North Carolina. Sergeant Kenyon voluntarily left a retiring column, returned in face of the enemy's fire, helped a wounded man upon a horse, and so enable him to escape capture or death.

Government offices
Preceded by John W. Vrooman	Clerk of the New York State Senate; 1888-1891	Succeeded by Charles T. Dunning
Preceded by Charles T. Dunning	Clerk of the New York State Senate; 1894-1897	Succeeded by James S. Whipple
