= John J. O'Connor (New York state legislator) =

New York politician

John J. O'Connor (June 14, 1855 – January 21, 1898) was an Irish-American politician.

== Life ==
John was born on June 14, 1855, in Ireland, immigrating to Brooklyn as a child. He came from County Donegal.

After graduating from St James' School, he was employed first as a bookkeeper and later as a wine merchant.

In 1889, John was elected to the New York State Assembly, representing the Kings County 4th District. He served in the Assembly in 1890, 1891, 1892, and 1893.

John was a member of the Catholic Benevolent Legion, the Knights of Columbus, and the Royal Arcanum.

John died on January 21, 1898, in his home on 170 Concord Street. He was buried in Holy Cross Cemetery.

New York State Assembly
Preceded by Henry F. Haggerty	New York State Assembly; Kings County, 4th District; 1890-1892	Succeeded by Joseph J. Cahill
Preceded by John Cooney	New York State Assembly; Kings County, 3rd District; 1893	Succeeded by John F. Houghton
