= James H. Tripp =

American politician (1832–1917)

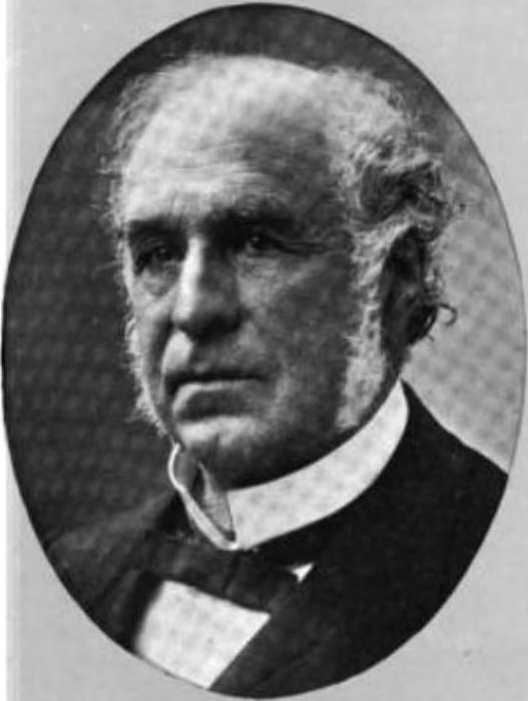
- Tripp in a 1910 publication

Member of the New York State Assembly from the Cortland County district
- In office 1892–1893
- Preceded by: Rufus T. Peck
- Succeeded by: Benjamin F. Lee

Personal details
- Born: January 17, 1832 Ancram, New York, U.S.
- Died: October 7, 1917 (aged 85)
- Party: Republican
- Spouse(s): Sarah Remington (m. 1865, died) Louisa Bogadus (m. 1873)
- Occupation: Banker; businessman; politician

James H. Tripp (January 17, 1832 – October 7, 1917) was an American banker, businessman, and politician from New York.

== Early life ==
James H. Tripp was born on January 17, 1832, in Ancram, New York, to Loretta (née Haviland) and Daniel A. Tripp. He moved to Dryden with his parents in 1837, followed by Harford a year later.

After graduating from Cortland Academy, Tripp spent the next five years teaching in the winter, working on his father's farm in the summer.

== Career ==
In the 1850s, he moved to Marathon, where he worked as a clerk in the general store Peck & Adams. Three years later, he took an interest in the firm and it was renamed Peck, Adams, & Tripp. When the partnership was dissolved in 1862, he began working as a cashier H. J. Messenger's banking house. A few months later, he moved to Canandaigua to take charge of a bank Messenger was president of. He stayed in Messenger's employment until 1866.

In 1865, Tripp began a partnership with Lyman Adams, his former partner, and conducted a general mercantile firm under the name Tripp & Adams. In 1867, the firm began a private banking business along with the mercantile business. In 1883, they sold the mercantile business to focus exclusively on banking. In 1884, when the First National Bank of Marathon was organized, Tripp was named its president. He also served as a director of the Homer National Bank, which he helped organize. He served as president until his resignation on October 1, 1917. In 1897, he was a vice-president of the American Bankers Association.

In 1891, Tripp was elected to the New York State Assembly as a Republican, representing Cortland County. He served in the Assembly in 1892 and 1893. He served in the committee of banking. He was treasurer of the village of Marathon and trustee of the Peck Memorial Library.

== Personal life ==
In 1865, Tripp married Sarah Remington. She died in 1870 or 1871. On November 11, 1873, he married Mrs. Louisa (née Farrington) Bogadus, daughter of Edward Farrington, of Cuyler. He adopted her daughter Anna from her first marriage.

Tripp died at home on October 7, 1917. He was buried in Marathon Cemetery.

New York State Assembly
Preceded by Rufus T. Peck	New York State Assembly; Cortland County; 1892-1893	Succeeded by Benjamin F. Lee (New York)
