= Omar V. Sage =

American politician

Omar Van Leuven Sage

Member of the New York State Assembly from the Greene County district
- In office January 1, 1890 – December 31, 1891
- Preceded by: Francis G. Walters
- Succeeded by: Edward M. Cole

Warden of Sing Sing
- In office 1894–1899
- Preceded by: Charles F. Durston
- Succeeded by: Addison Johnson

Personal details
- Born: December 17, 1834 Prattsville, New York
- Died: January 7, 1916 (aged 81) Catskill, New York
- Parent(s): Hart C. Sage; Clarissa H. Van Leuve

Colonel Omar Van Leuven Sage (December 17, 1834 – January 7, 1916) was the Warden of Sing Sing from 1894 to 1899.

== Biography ==
He was born in Prattsville, New York to Hart C. Sage and Clarissa H. Van Leuven. He married Julia Frances Houghtaling on February 15, 1868.

He was a member of the New York State Assembly (Greene Co.) in 1890 and 1891. He was county clerk for Greene County, New York. He was Warden of Sing Sing from 1894 to 1899. He later became Superintendent of the New York House of Refuge on Randall's Island.

He died in Catskill, New York on January 7, 1916.

== Legacy ==
His widow died in 1935.

New York State Assembly
Preceded by Francis G. Walters	New York State Assembly; Greene County; 1890-1891	Succeeded by Edward M. Cole
