= John H. Derby =

American politician

John Hamilton Derby (June 20, 1845 – November 26, 1925) was an American manufacturer and politician from New York.

== Life ==
Derby was born on June 20, 1845, in Sandy Hill (now Hudson Falls), New York. He was the only child of George Ferris Derby (1817–1873) and Jane F. Howland (1823–1871).

When Derby was 16 he joined his father (a railroad contractor) as the latter worked in western New York, Ohio, and Pennsylvania. Derby worked as a clerk for the Atlantic and Great Western Railroad. He married Margaret Forster Steuart (1845–1919) in Meadville, Pennsylvania, on September 6, 1870. John and Margaret had four children: George Hamilton (1875–1875), Archibald Steuart (1876–1973), Anna Louise O'Hara (1879–1918).

Derby returned to Sandy Hill in 1873, where he joined the firm Howland & Co. The firm was succeeded in 1892 by the Howland Paper Co., which was itself sold to the Union Bag and Paper Co. in 1899. He was involved in all of these companies for decades, serving as company director and vice president. He was also president of the Sandy Hill Power Co., director of the Sandy Hill National Bank, and a charter member of the local Royal Arcanum council. He was also a member of the Sons of the American Revolution, via his great-grandfather Benjamin Derby.

A politically active Republican, Derby was on the local board of education for 20 years, where he was president of the board, and represented Kingsbury on the board of supervisors for three years. In 1891, he was elected to the New York State Senate, where he represented the 16th District (Rensselaer and Washington counties). He served in the Senate in 1892 and 1893.

Derby died on November 26, 1925, in Orlando, Florida. He was buried in Union Cemetery in Fort Edward, New York.

New York State Senate
Preceded by Michael F. Collins	New York State Senate; 16th District; 1892–1893	Succeeded by Clarence Lexow
