= Edmund O'Connor =

American politician (1848–1898)

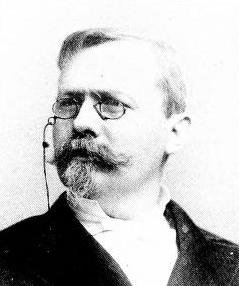
- O'Connor in 1893

Member of the New York Senate from the 25th district
- In office 1894–1895
- Preceded by: John A. Nichols
- Succeeded by: Charles Davis

Member of the New York Senate from the 24th district
- In office 1890–1893
- Preceded by: William Lewis
- Succeeded by: Charles W. Stapleton

Personal details
- Born: November 1848 near Mallow, County Cork, Ireland
- Died: July 15, 1898 (aged 49) Binghamton, New York, U.S.
- Resting place: Catholic Cemetery; Binghamton, New York, U.S.
- Party: Republican
- Spouse: Bridget Murphy (m. 1880)
- Children: 4
- Occupation: Politician; lawyer
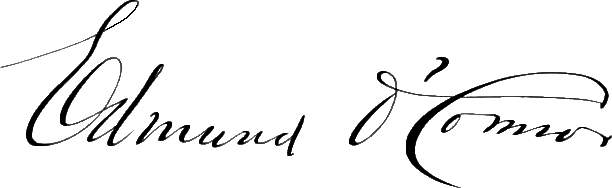
- Signature

Edmund O'Connor (November 1848 – July 15, 1898) was an American lawyer and politician from New York. He was President pro tempore of the New York State Senate in 1895.

== Early life ==
Edward O'Connor was born in November 1848 near Mallow, County Cork, Ireland. In the spring of 1851, the family moved to the United States and settled at Little Falls, New York. After the death of his father in 1862, he began to work at a railroad blacksmith shop in Little Falls. He attended local public and parochial schools in Little Falls and studied at Little Falls Academy and Delhi Academy from where he graduated in 1868. Then he studied law in the office of Judge Rollin H. Smith in Little Falls, was admitted to the bar in October 1870 in Oswego, New York.

== Career ==
In 1873, O'Connor moved to Binghamton and started law firm Ludden & O'Connor with William J. Ludden, later a judge in Troy. In 1876, he was elected city attorney and dissolved his partnership. He practiced alone afterward. From 1880 on, he was a trustee of the Binghamton State Asylum. In 1881, he was elected as chairman of the auditing committee of the asylum. In 1897, he was appointed as attorney for the board of the asylum by Governor Black.

He was a Republican member of the New York State Senate from 1890 to 1895, sitting in the 113th, 114th, 115th, 116th (all four 24th D.), 117th and 118th New York State Legislatures (both 25th D.); and was president pro tempore in 1895. In 1890, he was chairman of the committee on commerce and navigation. He was a member of the Lexow investigation committee. He introduced a bill for the "equal division of the election offices of the state between the Republican and Democratic parties".

In the session of 1892, when Republican leader, he made a strong but unsuccessful fight against the re-apportionment of the state, and for his refusal to vote on an enumeration bill (voting reapportionment) he and two other senators were declared guilty of contempt by Lt. Gov. William F. Sheehan and their names taken from the roll. But they were supported by the judiciary committee in their position, were purged of contempt and their names restored.

After leaving the senate, O'Connor continued his law practice.

== Personal life ==
O'Connor married Bridget Murphy of Deposit on November 17, 1880. They had four children, Edmund, Helen, William and Florence. He was a member of St. Mary's Catholic Church. His brother William O'Connor was a port warden of the Port of New York.

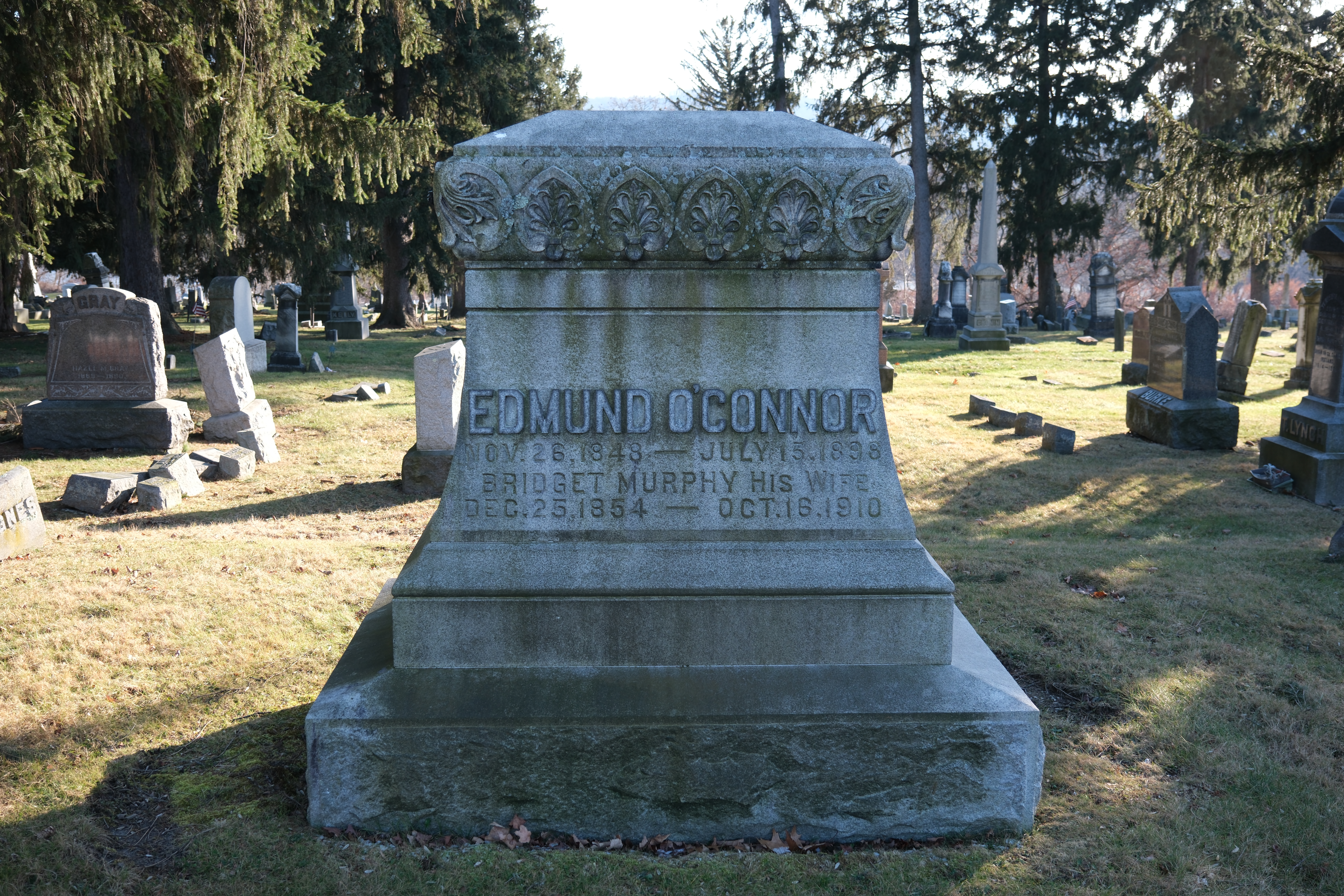
Grave of O'Connor in St. Patricks Cemetery

O'Connor died on July 15, 1898, at his home at 132 Prospect Avenue in Binghamton. He was buried at the Catholic Cemetery in Binghamton.

== See also ==
- List of New York Legislature members expelled or censured

New York State Senate
Preceded by William Lewis	New York State Senate; 24th District; 1890–1893	Succeeded by Charles W. Stapleton
Preceded by John A. Nichols	New York State Senate; 25th District; 1894–1895	Succeeded by Charles Davis
Political offices
Preceded by Charles T. Saxton	President pro tempore of the New York State Senate; 1895	Succeeded by Timothy E. Ellsworth
