= Thomas Finegan =

American politician

Thomas Finegan (May 8, 1852 – August 9, 1921) was an American manufacturer and politician from New York.

== Life ==
Finegan was born on May 8, 1852, in Haverstraw, New York. His parents were machinist James Finegan and Catherine McManus, Irish immigrants from County Monaghan. He attended school in this village until he started working at 15. Finegan worked in various capacities under brick manufacturers Wood & Keenan. He then worked in boating and railroading in different parts of the country. This was followed by working as a bricklayer on several big public projects across the country, including the Brooklyn Bridge, the New York State Capitol, and the Chicago Sewage Project.

In 1881, Finegan returned to Haverstraw and opened a retail cigar store. A year later, he purchased a mineral water business. In 1895, he began brewing ale and porter, and in 1900 he started brewing lager beer as well. In 1891, he leased a brickyard and started manufacturing bricks. He was also involved with real estate in Haverstraw and neighboring town of Stony Point. He served as town assessor for Haverstraw.

In 1891, Finegan was elected to the New York State Assembly as a Democrat, representing Rockland County. He served in the Assembly in 1892, 1893, and 1903. He served on the Commerce and Navigation Committee as well as the Electricity, Gas, and Water Supply Committee.

Finegan's wife was Julia Kohler. Their children were Mrs. Thomas Gagan, Julia, Regis, James E., and Thomas Jr. He was a member of the Foresters of America.

Finegan died on August 9, 1921. He was buried in St. Peter's Cemetery.

New York State Assembly
Preceded by Frank P. Demarest	New York State Assembly; Rockland County; 1892-1893	Succeeded by Otis H. Cutler
Preceded by George Dickey	New York State Assembly; Rockland County; 1903	Succeeded by Matthew Hurd
