= Otis H. Cutler =

American businessman and politician (1866–1922)

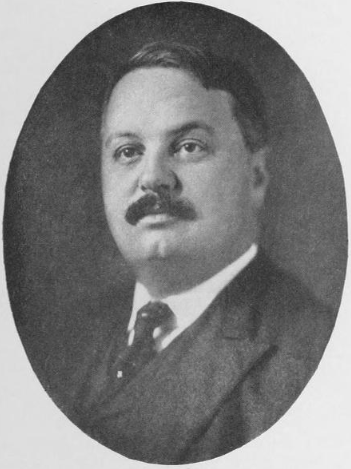

Member of the New York State Assembly from Rockland County
- In office 1894–1896
- Preceded by: Thomas Finegan
- Succeeded by: Frederick L. Whritner

Personal details
- Born: Otis Henderson Cutler; May 15, 1866 New York City, U.S.
- Died: March 4, 1922 (aged 55) Miami, Florida, U.S.
- Resting place: Suffern, New York, U.S.
- Party: Republican
- Spouse: Mary A. Straut
- Parent(s): Otis Nelson Cutler; Mary Caroline Frye Tebbets
- Profession: Politician, businessman

Otis Henderson Cutler (May 15, 1866 – March 4, 1922) was an American businessman and politician from New York.

== Life ==
Cutler was born on May 15, 1866, in New York City, New York, the son of Captain Otis Nelson Cutler and Mary Caroline Frye Tebbets. His mother was a cousin of William P. Frye.

Cutler attended public school in Suffern and went to Rockland College. Upon his father's death in 1883, he moved to Washington, D.C., and became private secretary to his relative Senator Frye. He later became clerk of the United States Senate Committee on Commerce. He returned to Suffern in 1892 and became secretary to several mining and construction companies in New York City. In 1893, he was elected to the New York State Assembly as a Republican over, representing Rockland County. He defeated the Democratic incumbent Thomas Finegan. He served in the Assembly in 1894 (when he introduced bills to protect the rights of policyholders in insurance companies, extend the time when insurance companies have to pay for the support of the exempt firemen's benevolent fund, and in regard to the instruction of the blind), 1895 (when he was chairman of the Committee on Internal Affairs), and 1896 (when he was chairman of the Committee on Taxation and Retrenchment). He was a delegate to the 1900 and 1920 Republican National Conventions and a presidential elector in the 1908 and 1920 presidential elections.

Cutler declined a renomination in the Assembly to the accept a position at the Ramapo Iron Works in Hillburn. He then organized the Ramapo Foundry Co. of Mahwah, New Jersey, which was then merged with the American Brake Shoe & Foundry Co. He was secretary of the North River Bridge Company from 1895 to 1900 and manager of the Ramapo Foundry Company. In 1902, he became vice-president and general manager of the American Brake Shoe & Foundry Co. He then served as its president from 1903 to 1916, at which point he became chairman of its board of directors. During World War I, he was manager of the insular and foreign division of the American Red Cross. He was a director of a number of large corporations, including the Baldwin Locomotive Works, the American Surety Company, the Liberty National Bank, Metropolitan Life Insurance, the New York Telephone Company, the Manganese Steel Rail Company, the Rail Joint and the Railway Steel Spring Company.

Cutler attended the Episcopal Church. He was a member of the Knights Templar, the Union League Club, and the Metropolitan Club. He was married to Mary A. Straut.

Cutler died of heart disease aboard the yacht Seramic in Miami, Florida, on March 4, 1922. His body was sent back to Suffern and buried there.

New York State Assembly
Preceded by Thomas Finegan	New York State Assembly; Rockland County; 1894–1896	Succeeded by Frederick L. Whritner
