= Sylvester Malone =

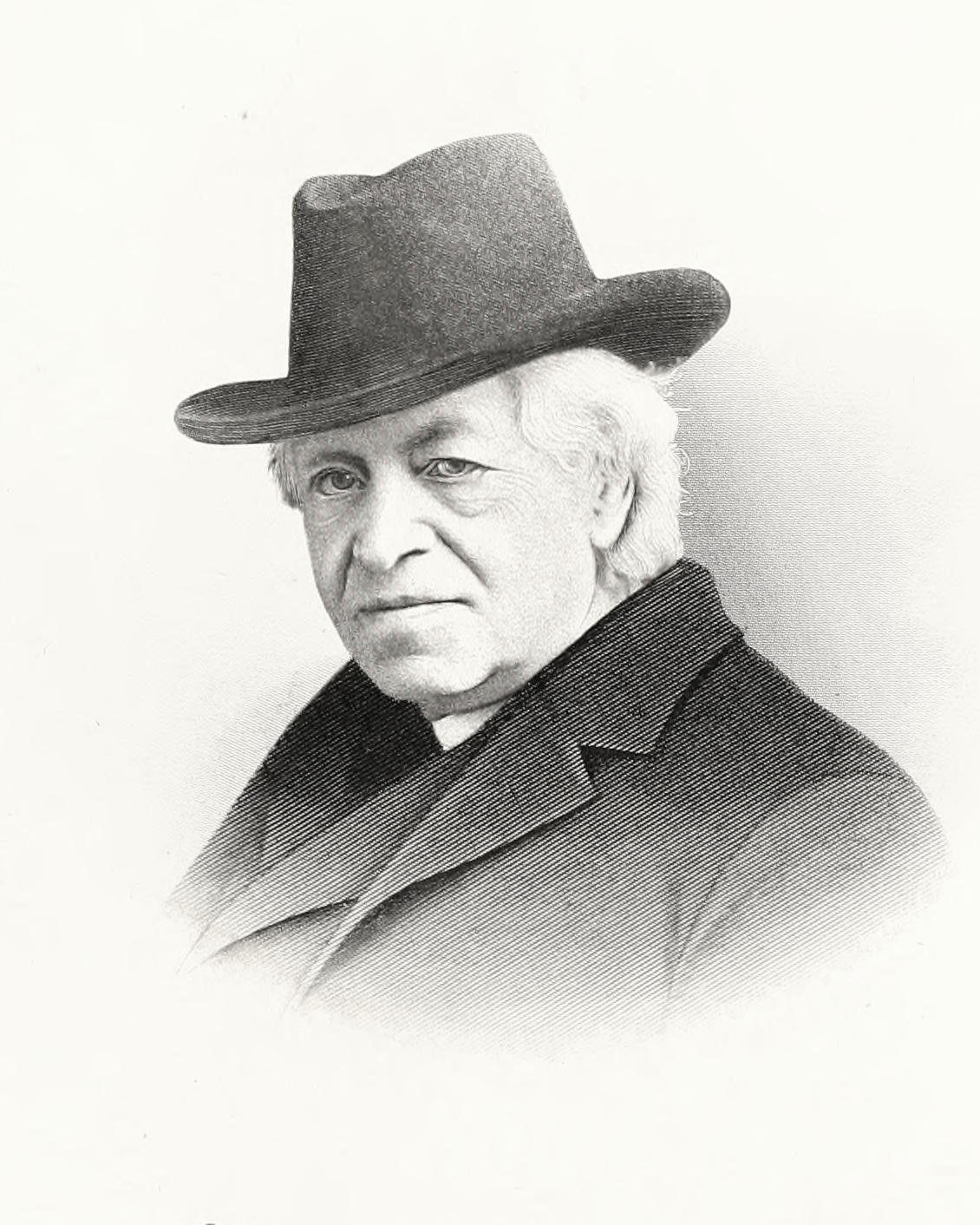
Sylvester Malone

Rev. Sylvester Malone (8 May 1821 – 29 December 1899) was an Irish-born American Catholic priest.

== Life ==
Malone was born in Trim, County Meath, Ireland on 8 May 1821, the son of Laurence and Marcella Malone. His father was a civil engineer and surveyor.

Receiving a classical education, in 1838 he was recruited to go to America by the Rev. Andrew J. Byrne, then pastor of St. James' Church in Manhattan. In the spring of 1839, Byrne and Malone left from Kingstown for Liverpool where on 10 April they sailed to Philadelphia, arriving on 12 May 1839. After calling on Bishop Francis Kenrick, they made their way to New York, where Bishop Hughes advised Malone to enter St. Joseph's Seminary in LaFargeville, Jefferson County, New York. The following year, the seminary moved to Rose Hill in Fordham, where Malone continued his studies. As a seminarian, on 10 March 1844 he participated in the ceremonies when Bishop Hughes consecrated Byrne as first bishop of Little Rock, Arkansas and John McCloskey coadjutor bishop of New York.

Fr. Malone was ordained by Bishop McCloskey on 15 August 1844. Shortly afterward, Malone was visiting Father Joseph P. Burke, pastor of St. Peter's Church in Poughkeepsie, who asked him to attend a small mission a few miles away. Malone said his first Mass in the village of Wappingers Falls, an up-river mill town.

Bishop Hughes soon sent Father Malone to Williamsburg, Brooklyn. He befriended the Irish-born architect Patrick Keely and together they were responsible for a number of church buildings. In 1861 he founded the Irish-American fraternal organization The Friendly Sons of St. Patrick in Brooklyn. A man noted for his tolerance, he was friendly with clerics from other Christian churches and local rabbis. Politically, he was a Republican Abolitionist and supported Lincoln; he was also a supporter of the Land League in Ireland, and for Home Rule for Ireland. He died on 29 December 1899.

His nephews Lawrence and Sylvester Malone became lawyers, as did his niece Marcella Malone. Their sister, Maud Malone, was a suffragette and labor leader in New York City.
