= John McKeown (Brooklyn) =

American politician (1859–1919)

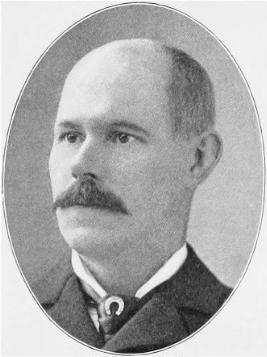

Member of the New York State Assembly
- In office 1896–1905
- Constituency: Kings County, 2nd District
- In office 1895
- Constituency: Kings County, 1st District

Personal details
- Born: 1859 Ireland
- Died: September 9, 1919 (aged 59–60) Brooklyn, New York, US
- Resting place: Holy Cross Cemetery
- Party: Democratic
- Spouse: Esther McGowan

John McKeown (1859 – September 9, 1919) was an Irish-American politician from New York.

== Life ==
McKeown was born in 1859 in Ireland. He immigrated to the United States when he was 18 and settled in Brooklyn. Starting in 1880, he worked in the shoe business.

In 1890, McKeown was elected to the Kings County board of supervisors. In 1892, he was re-elected supervisor. In 1894, he was elected to the New York State Assembly as a Democrat, representing the Kings County 1st District. He served in the Assembly in 1895, 1896, 1897, 1898, 1899, 1900, 1901, 1902, 1903, 1904, and 1905. In his last year in the Assembly, he was appointed a member of the Hughes-Armstrong Insurance Investigating Committee.

In 1906, Mayor George B. McClellan Jr. appointed McKeown Deputy Tenement House Commissioner, in charge of Brooklyn, Queens, and Richmond. In 1911, Comptroller Somers appointed him Supervisor of Private Bank Examiners. In 1918, he was appointed Clerk of the First District Municipal Court.

McKeown was married to Esther McGowan. Their children were Marie, Esther, Majorie, Virginia, Helen, John A., James Mitchell, and Frank E. He was a member of the Roman Catholic Orphan Asylum Society, the Knights of Columbus, St. Patrick's Society, the St. James Holy Name Society, and the Kings County Democratic Committee. He was a parishioner of St. James Pro-cathedral.

McKeown died at home on September 9, 1919. He was buried in Holy Cross Cemetery.

New York State Assembly
Preceded by William J. Plant	New York State Assembly; Kings County, 1st District; 1895	Succeeded by Thomas H. Wagstaff
Preceded by John A. Hennessy	New York State Assembly; Kings County, 2nd District; 1896-1905	Succeeded by Patrick Donohue
