= William Reid (New York politician) =

American politician (1827–1906)

William Reid (1827 – March 16, 1906) was an American manufacturer and politician from New York.

== Life ==
Reid was born in 1827 in Hebron, New York. He attended Argyle Academy and initially worked in lumbering. He later worked as a manufacturer in West Hebron.

In 1891, Reid was elected to the New York State Assembly as a Republican, representing the Washington County 2nd District. He served in the Assembly in 1892. He also served as town supervisor for two terms.

Reid died at home in West Hebron on March 16, 1906. He was buried in New Hebron Cemetery.

New York State Assembly
Preceded by Albert Johnson	New York State Assembly; Washington County, 2nd District; 1892	Succeeded by District Abolished
