= George J. Gove =

American politician

George Johnson Gove (December 4, 1834 – June 2, 1913) was an American businessman and politician from New York.

== Life ==
Gove was born on December 4, 1834, in Watervliet, New York, the son of Johnson Gove and Sarah Walker. When his father died, he moved with his mother to Root.

When he was 13, Gove began working in the store of Ira Hoag. When he was 14, he began working for his future father-in-law John Bowdish as a clerk. In 1870, he became a partner to the business. In 1884, the partnership was dissolved and he brought in his son as a partner. He also had a 140-acre farm. He served as a town clerk for two terms, and was elected town supervisor in 1884-1885 and 1889-1891.

In 1891, Gove was elected to the New York State Assembly as a Democrat, representing Montgomery County. He served in the Assembly in 1892.

In 1858, Gove married Louisa Bowdish. They had six children, three of whom died before Gove. The surviving children were Rev. John Bowdish Gove, Myrta L., and Maggie M. Louisa's father, John Bowdish, was an Assemblyman and a delegate to the 1846 New York Constitutional Convention. Gove was a member of the Independent Order of Odd Fellows.

Gove died at his Rural Grove home on June 2, 1913. He was buried in Gove Cemetery.

New York State Assembly
Preceded by John F. Dwyer	New York State Assembly; Montgomery County; 1892	Succeeded by Edward J. Hand
