= Charles J. Kurth =

American lawyer and politician

Charles Justus Kurth (October 23, 1862 – September 28, 1896) was an American lawyer and politician.

== Life ==
Kurth was born on October 23, 1862, in Brooklyn, New York.

Kurth attended Public School No. 3 in Brooklyn, the Royal College at Brandenburgh, Prussia, and Columbia Law School. He was admitted to the bar in 1884 and had a law office at 375-379 Fulton Street. He also had a law office at 200 Montague Street, and by the time he died, he practiced law in the Germania bank building at Fulton Street. While young, he studied law in the law firm Place, Nelson & Place. As a lawyer, he was involved in the acquittal of Annie Phillips, George L. Nicodemus, and Mary Ramsay of the charge of murder.

During the reign of John Y. McKane of Gravesend, Kurth was counsel to several official boards there, notably the board of health and the town board. In 1889, he was elected to the New York State Assembly as a Republican, representing the Kings County 12th District. He served in the Assembly in 1890. He was a delegate to the 1894 New York State Constitutional Convention.

Kurth was district clerk of the School District No. 6 of Gravesend, secretary of the Coney Island Fire Department and the John S. McKeon Association of Gravesend, and a member of the Order of United Friends, the Ancient Order of Foresters of America, and the American Legion of Honor. In 1887, he married Jessie Woolsey of Gravesend, and the couple had two children.

Kurth died in Seney Hospital on September 28, 1896. His funeral was conducted at his house by Rev. Lewis Edwin Pease, pastor of the Church of Our Father, First Universalist Church. He was buried in Green-Wood Cemetery.

New York State Assembly
Preceded by James P. Graham	New York State Assembly; Kings County, 12th District; 1890	Succeeded by Mortimer C. Earl
