= James Stead =

American politician

James Stead (May 23, 1832 – May 27, 1902) was an American steamer superintendent and politician from New York.

== Life ==
Stead was born on May 23, 1832, in Cairo, New York, son of farmer and woolen manufacturer David Stead and Hannah Mackelwaite. His parents were both English immigrants, his father immigrating from Huddersfield, England.

Stead left home when he was eighteen and began working as a clerk for Penfield, Day & Co., which managed a steamboat line between New York City and Catskill. He later became a captain for the company, serving with them for several years. He then spent three years as captain of a steamer owner by Hamilton & Smith, freighting between New Baltimore and New York. He later worked as a salesman for the firm on a line of boats between Coxsackie and New York. He spent a year during the American Civil War working for the government as an inspector of the bay for the army, loading schooners in Jersey City and making reports to Quartermaster Brown. He then spent three years as captain of the New Champion, a boat owned by Black & Donahue that ran from Catskill to New York. He then worked with George H. Penfield, his first employer, by running a line of barges for two years. After another three years working on the New Champion again, he became an organizer of the Catskill and New York Steamboat Company.

Initially, Stead commanded one of the boats while a Mr. Donahue was the company's superintendent, but after Donahue's death Stead became the company's superintendent and general manager. The company initially had two small boats, but over time it bought more and larger boats that travelled from New York to Catskill. The company was connected with the Catskill Mountain Railroad and carried large numbers of tourists and freight. Stead served village trustee for three years and president of its board of trustees for one. He was also trustee of the Catskill Savings Bank, president and owner of the Catskill Ferry Company, and a director of the Hudson Steamboat Company.

Stead was president of the Greene County Agricultural Society for four years. He served as Sheriff of Greene County from 1889 to 1891. In 1892, he was elected to the New York State Assembly as a Republican, representing Greene County. He served in the Assembly in 1893. In the Assembly, he submitted bills to make appropriations for the improvement of the Hudson River, complete the State Armory in Catskill, and purchase cell doors for Sing Sing.

Stead attended the Methodist Episcopal Church. In 1865, he married Rachel E. Pettit of Dutchess County. They had a daughter, Ida H.

Stead died in Catskill on May 27, 1902. He was buried in the Town of Catskill Cemetery.

New York State Assembly
Preceded by Edward M. Cole	New York State Assembly; Greene County; 1893	Succeeded by Ira B. Kerr
