= Theodore Cole =

Theodore Cole or Ted Cole may refer to:

- Ted Cole (born 1971), Canadian voice actor
- Theodore Cole (convict), criminal who attempted to escape from Alcatraz Federal Penitentiary
- Ted Cole, character in Rising Sun (Crichton novel)

== See also ==
- Edward Cole (disambiguation)
