= James S. Whipple =

US lawyer and politician

James Spencer Whipple (October 1, 1852 – April 1, 1941) was an American lawyer, politician, and public official in New York State.

== Life ==
Whipple was born on October 1, 1852, in Steamburg, New York, the son of Henry and Martha Whipple. During the American Civil War, his father enlisted in the 154th New York Volunteer Infantry, was captured in the Battle of Gettysburg, and died in Andersonville Prison.

After his father died, Whipple moved to Salamanca and worked in the Atlantic and Great Western Railroad. He studied law while working there and in 1881 he passed the state bar and started working as a lawyer.

In 1879, Whipple was elected a coroner of Cattaraugus County and justice of the peace for Salamanca. He was also elected police justice of Salamanca at around that time. He was an alternate delegate to the 1884 Republican National Convention.

In 1887 he was elected to the New York State Assembly as a Republican, representing the Cattaraugus County 2nd District. He served in the Assembly in 1888, 1889, 1890, and 1891. In 1892, he was elected town supervisor of Salamanca and appointed by Judge William James Wallace a United States commissioner. He served as Clerk of the New York State Senate in 1898, 1899, 1900, 1901, 1902, 1903, 1904, and 1905. He resigned as Clerk in 1905 upon his appointment as New York State Forest, Fish, and Game Commissioner.

He was a delegate to the 1915 New York State Constitutional Convention. In 1921, he was appointed referee for the Bureau of Workmen's Compensation. In 1927, he was made a member of the State Industrial Board.

Whipple married his first wife, Sarah R. Dean, in 1873. She died in 1928. In 1930, he married Amy Tucker. He had three sons.

Whipple died on April 1, 1941, while on a train en route from St. Petersburg, Florida, when the train was near New York City. He was buried in the family plot in Wildwood Cemetery.

New York State Assembly
Preceded by Erastus S. Ingersoll	New York State Assembly; Cattaraugus County, 2nd District; 1888-1891	Succeeded by Solon S. Laing
Political offices
Preceded by John Snyders Kenyon	Clerk of the New York State Senate; 1898-1905	Succeeded by Lafayette B. Gleason
