= Rufus T. Peck =

American politician

Rufus T. Peck (December 24, 1836 – July 24, 1900) was an American teacher, publisher, and politician from New York.

== Life ==
Peck was born on December 24, 1836, in Solon, New York, the son of farmer Lyman Peck and Almira Thompson.

Peck attended the New York Central College. He worked as a teacher for fourteen years, and then as a merchant for three years in his native town. In 1874, he was elected school commissioner of the northern district of Cortland County. He served two terms in that office. He read law under R. Holland Duell, and was admitted to the bar in 1876, but he only practiced law in connection with his own private business affairs. In 1876, he joined the publishing house of Major L. H. Evarts of Philadelphia and established a publishing firm called Evarts & Peck. The firm published a number of city and county histories in the United States. He was postmaster of Solon from 1867 to 1875, vice-president of the State Teachers Association, and a director of the Elmira National Bank.

In 1888, Peck was elected to the New York State Assembly as a Republican, representing Cortland County. He served in the Assembly in 1889, 1890, and 1891. By that year, he moved to Cortland. He was a delegate to the 1892 Republican National Convention.

Peck was a trustee of the First Baptist Church of Cortland. In 1859, he married Susan Wells of Kings Township, Ontario, Canada. Their children were Louise E., Arthur R., Frank John, and Fred Ross. Susan died in 1889, and in 1892 Peck married Jeanette Dutton of Perry, Iowa.

Peck died in a private Auburn sanitarium, where he was staying for over a year, on July 24, 1900. He was buried in the family plot in the Cortland Rural Cemetery.

New York State Assembly
Preceded by Wayland D. Tisdale	New York State Assembly; Cortland County; 1889–1891	Succeeded by James H. Tripp
