= Isaac Mitchell (New York politician, born 1835) =

American politician

Isaac Mitchell (June 5, 1835 – February 2, 1893) was an American farmer and politician from New York.

== Life ==
Mitchell was born on June 5, 1835, in Stone Mills, New York, the son of Hiram Mitchell and Anna Wood.

Mitchell attended LaFargeville Academy, working on a farm in the summer while attending school in the winter. He also taught at school for several years while working on a farm. He became a successful farmer and land owner, and was involved in the cattle trade. He was involved in a bonding fight while town supervisor of Orleans, ultimately saving the town at least 50,000 dollars.

Mitchell was town assessor from 1876 to 1878, town supervisor from 1879 to 1884, and chairman of the supervisor board in 1883 and 1884. In 1889, he was elected to the New York State Assembly as a Republican, representing the Jefferson County 2nd District. He served in the Assembly in 1890 and 1891.

Mitchell was a director and president of the Jefferson County Agricultural Society and a member of the Freemasons. In 1863, he married Kate L. Bort of Orleans. Their children were Sadie L., Lottie, Fred B., and Lucien C.

Mitchell died at home of pneumonia on February 2, 1893. He was buried in Stone Mills Cemetery.

New York State Assembly
Preceded by Andrew C. Comstock	New York State Assembly; Jefferson County, 2nd District; 1890–1891	Succeeded by Martin L. Willard
