= William T. Lamont =

American politician

William T. Lamont (November 27, 1830 – February 12, 1908) was an American merchant and politician from New York.

== Life ==
Lamont was born on November 27, 1830, in Charlotteville, New York, the son of Thomas W. Lamont. He moved to Richmondville in 1859.

Lamont attended the New York Conference in Charlotteville. He worked as a dealer of produce and stock. He served as a town supervisor for two years, a member of the board of education for several years, and trustee and treasurer of the village of Charlotteville.

In 1891, Lamont was elected to the New York State Assembly as a Democrat, representing Schoharie County. He served in the Assembly in 1892.

Lamont married Mary Rogers of Massachusetts in 1859. They had three children, Ella, Wilbur F., and W. Stanley. His second wife was Adeline Smith. He was a member of the Methodist Episcopal Church.

Lamont died at home on February 12, 1908. He was buried in the Town of Catskill Cemetery.

New York State Assembly
Preceded by Ambrose R. Hunting	New York State Assembly; Schoharie County; 1892	Succeeded by Benjamin H. Avery
