= Michael F. Collins =

American politician

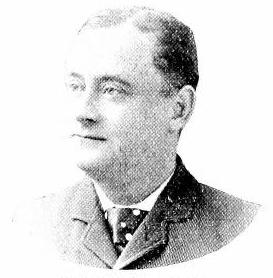
Michael F. Collins (1894)

Michael F. Collins (September 27, 1854 in Troy, Rensselaer County, New York – December 22, 1928) was an American newspaper publisher and politician from New York.

== Life ==
He was the son of Patrick Collins (died 1876), a tailor who came from County Limerick to Troy in 1848. Michael attended the common schools, and then became a typesetter and printer working for the Troy Weekly and then the Troy Press. In 1877, during a printers strike, Collins and seven other newspaper employees founded the Troy Evening Standard. He was City Editor at the Standard until 1879, when he bought the Sunday Trojan and renamed it the Troy Observer. In 1880, he married Caroline E. O'Sullivan, and they had six children.

Collins was a Democratic member of the New York State Assembly (Rensselaer Co., 1st D.) in 1886 and 1887.

He was a member of the New York State Senate (16th D.) from 1888 to 1891, sitting in the 111th, 112th, 113th and 114th New York State Legislatures.

He was again a member of the State Senate (18th D.) in 1894 and 1895.

He died on December 22, 1928; was buried at St. Mary's Cemetery in Troy.

== Sources ==
- The New York Red Book compiled by Edgar L. Murlin (published by James B. Lyon, Albany NY, 1897; pg. 403f and 505f)
- Biographical sketches of the members of the Legislature in The Evening Journal Almanac (1888)
- MICHAEL F. COLLINS DIES OF A STROKE in NYT on December 23, 1928 (subscription required)
- Bio transcribed from Landmarks of Rensselaer County, NY by George Baker Anderson (1897)

New York State Assembly
| Preceded by James P. Hooley | New York State Assembly; Rensselaer County, 1st District; 1886–1887 | Succeeded by George O'Neil |
New York State Senate
| Preceded by Albert C. Comstock | New York State Senate; 16th District; 1888–1891 | Succeeded by John H. Derby |
| Preceded by Harvey J. Donaldson | New York State Senate; 18th District; 1894–1895 | Succeeded by Maurice Featherson |
