= Morningside Cemetery (Malone, New York) =

Cemetery in Malone, New York, USA

Coordinates: 44°51′14″N 74°16′37″W

Morningside Cemetery is in Malone, New York

== Burials ==
- Benjamin S. W. Clark (1829–1912)
- William Henry Flack (1861–1907)
- Clarence Evans Kilburn
- William C. Stevens (1848–1897), New York assemblyman
- William A. Wheeler (1819–1887) served as Vice President of the United States under Rutherford Hayes.
- Orville H. Gibson (1856–1918) Luthier, inventor, innovator and founder of the Gibson Mandolin-Guitar Manufacturing Co., which ultimately became the Gibson Guitar Corporation.

== See also ==
- List of burial places of presidents and vice presidents of the United States
