= Edward M. Cole =

American newspaper editor and politician

Edward M. Cole (October 26, 1844 – April 13, 1915) was a newspaper editor and politician from New York.

== Life ==
Cole was born on October 26, 1844, in Conesville, New York. His parents were Ahaz N. Cole and Caroline M. Pierce. He moved to Roxbury with his family in 1854. In 1857, they moved to Windham, where they had a farm two and a half miles north known as the Cole Homestead. After he finished school, he spent a few years teaching in the district schools.

In 1862, Cole started working for the Bloomville Mirror in Bloomville, where he learned the printing trade under editor Simon B. Champion. In 1867, he moved to Windham and became co-owner of the newspaper The Windham Journal. In 1868, he turned his attention away from the Journal towards other business. In 1872, he again became co-owner of the Journal. In 1878, he became the sole proprietor of the paper. Other than a nine month period in 1882, he remained the sole owner and editor of the paper for the rest of his life.

In 1875, Cole helped organize the Catskill, Cairo, and Windham Telegraph Company. The company later fell to the control of Western Union Telegraph Company, but it still provided local and general telegraph service in Greene County. He was elected town supervisor of Windham in 1884 and served as justice of the peace for several years.

In 1891, Cole was elected to the New York State Assembly as a Democrat, representing Greene County. He served in the Assembly in 1892. He then served as postmaster of Windham from 1893 to 1897. He also served on the Windham town board and board of education.

In 1874, Cole married Josephine M. Keeler of Bloomville, daughter of assemblyman Stephen H. Keeler. They had two children, Keeler M. and Bessie Louise.

Cole died at home from an embolism on April 13, 1915. He was buried in Windham Cemetery.

New York State Assembly
Preceded by Omar V. Sage	New York State Assembly; Greene County; 1892	Succeeded by James Stead
