= Frank Gallagher (Brooklyn) =

American politician

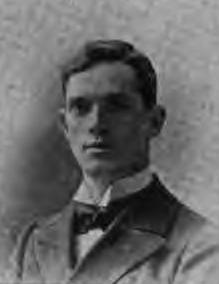
Frank Gallagher (1897)

Frank Gallagher (April 28, 1870 Brooklyn, Kings County, New York – June 10, 1932 Manhattan, New York City) was an American politician from New York.

== Life ==
He attended the public schools and St. Peter's Academy. He graduated from St. John's College in 1888, and then became a journalist. In 1891, he became a political writer for the Brooklyn Daily Eagle.

Gallagher was a member of the New York State Assembly (Kings Co., 4th D.) in 1895.

He was a member of the New York State Senate (3rd D.) from 1896 to 1898, sitting in the 119th, 120th and 121st New York State Legislatures.

For some years he was the secretary of the Bush Terminal Company of Brooklyn. Subsequently, he moved to a law firm Dykman, Oeland & Khune, which is now known as Cullen and Dykman LLP, also in Brooklyn.

On January 2, 1913, he was appointed by Mayor William Jay Gaynor as President of the New York City Civil Service Commission after being an Examiner for the commission for thirteen years.

He died on June 11, 1932, in the French Hospital in Manhattan, of a "heart attack".

== Sources ==
- The New York Red Book compiled by Edgar L. Murlin (published by James B. Lyon, Albany NY, 1897; pg. 147f, 404 and 511)
- Sketches of the members of the Legislature in The Evening Journal Almanac (1895; pg. 55)
- NEW CIVIL SERVICE HEAD in NYT on January 3, 1913
- FRANK GALLAGHER, EX-LEGISLATOR, DIES in NYT on June 11, 1932 (Subscription required)

New York State Assembly
Preceded by Joseph J. Cahill	New York State Assembly; Kings County, 4th District; 1895	Succeeded by George W. Wilson
New York State Senate
Preceded by William H. Reynolds	New York State Senate; 3rd District; 1896–1898	Succeeded by Thomas H. Cullen
