= William D. Stevenson =

American politician

William Daniel Stevenson (December 11, 1847 – July 30, 1914) was an American politician from New York.

== Life ==
Stevenson was born on December 11, 1847, in North Argyle, New York. His parents were William and Susanna Terry Stevenson. His father died when Stevenson was young. A few years later, his mother married a Mr. Orr of Troy. He then grew up in Troy, but spent his summers in North Argyle. He attended Troy Academy and Dr. Read's Boarding school in Geneva.

While in Troy, he was a member of the Arba Read Fire Company. After his marriage, he returned to North Argyle, where he worked in a brick store his father once worked in. He was president of the Argyle-Fort Edward Plank Road Company, and a director and president of the Washington County Agricultural Society. He was also director of the Fort Edward National Bank and president of the Argyle and Fort Edward Telegraph Company. He owned several valuable farms and was involved in real estate.

Stevenson was elected as town supervisor, and served as chairman of the board. In 1890, he was elected to the New York State Assembly as a Republican, representing the Washington County 1st District. He served in the Assembly in 1891, 1892, and 1895.

In 1870, Stevenson married Elizabeth Livingston Wallace. They had only one child, Mrs. A. U. C. Fowler.

Stevenson died at home from Bright's disease on July 30, 1914. He was buried in Oakwood Cemetery in Troy.

New York State Assembly
Preceded by Charles W. Larmon	New York State Assembly; Washington County, 1st District; 1891-1892	Succeeded by District Abolished
Preceded by William Roscoe Hobbie	New York State Assembly; Washington County; 1895	Succeeded by William Roscoe Hobbie
