= George L. Weeks =

American politician

George Lewis Weeks II (February 16, 1846 – August 1, 1938) was an American politician from New York.

== Life ==
Weeks was born on February 16, 1846, in East Hampton, New York. He was the son of whaler George L. Weeks I and Clarissa King, both descended from early Long Island pioneer families.

When he was 12, Weeks went to school in Brooklyn to learn to be a shipwright. He worked at a number of shipyards over the years, and in 1882 he established his own shipyard in Grassy Point, Rockland County. One of the shipyards he worked at was owned by Elliott Bulloch Roosevelt, Theodore Roosevelt's brother and Eleanor Roosevelt's father. In 1884, he was a justice of the peace in Stony Point, Rockland County. In 1891, he moved to Seaford, Long Island, where he lived for the rest of his life.

In 1891, Weeks was elected to the New York State Assembly as a Republican, representing the Queens County 2nd District. He served in the Assembly in 1892.

Weeks was married twice, once to Adeline Augusta Price (who died young), and later to Henrietta L. Mahon (who died in 1932). He had two children, George L. Weeks III and Ella. He was a member of the City Island lodge of Masons.

Weeks died on August 1, 1938, in his Seaford home at the age of 92, a great-great-grandfather. He was buried in the Oakwood Cemetery in Bay Shore.

New York State Assembly
Preceded by James A. McKenna	New York State Assembly; Queens County, 2nd District; 1892	Succeeded by Samuel V. Searing
