= Eddie Cole (American football coach) =

American football player and coach (1919–2015)

Biographical details
- Born: October 14, 1919; Waxahachie, Texas, U.S.
- Died: June 24, 2015 (aged 95); Arlington, Texas, U.S.
- Education: UC Santa Barbara

Coaching career (HC unless noted)
- 1951–1952: College of Idaho

Head coaching record
- Overall: 12–5–1

Accomplishments and honors

Championships
- 1 NWC (1952)

Eddie G. Cole (October 14, 1919 – June 24, 2015) was an American football player and coach. He served as the head football coach at the College of Idaho in Caldwell, Idaho from 1951 to 1952, compiling a record of 12–5–1.

Cole was a graduate of the University of California, Santa Barbara.

== Head coaching record ==
Year	Team	Overall	Conference	Standing	Bowl/playoffs
College of Idaho Coyotes (Northwest Conference) (1951–1952)
1951	College of Idaho	5–4	3–2	3rd	
1952	College of Idaho	7–1–1	4–0–1	T–1st	
College of Idaho:		12–5–1	9–6		
Total:		7–2–1			
National championship Conference title Conference division title or championship game berth
