= Charles W. Stapleton =

American politician

Charles W. Stapleton (November 23, 1853 – December 6, 1935) was an American lawyer and politician from New York.

== Life ==
Stapleton was born on November 23, 1853, in Hamilton, New York. He studied law at Hamilton College and was admitted to the bar in 1879. He practiced law in Hamilton until 1886. In 1885, he was elected County Clerk of Madison County. He served as County Clerk from 1886 to 1891. He later moved in Morrisville, and had a law office in Syracuse.

In 1893, Hamilton was elected to the New York State Senate as a Republican, representing New York's 24th State Senate district (Onondaga and Madison Counties). He served in the Senate in 1894 and 1895. While in the Senate, he introduced a large number of bills related to the Syracuse charter and his Senate district specifically.

In 1896, he began practicing civil law in New York City, specializing in patent law. He retired from his law practice in about 1929. He was also a founder and president of the American Rubber Tire Company. The company was later merged with the Kelly-Springfield Tire Company, and he served that firm as general counsel.

Stapleton was a member of the New York State Bar Association, the New York County Lawyers Association, the Freemasons, the Knights Templar, and the New York Athletic Club. In 1912, he married Genevieve Bishop of White Plains.

Stapleton died at his Riverdale home of pneumonia on December 6, 1935. He was buried in Woodlawn Cemetery in Hamilton.

New York State Senate
Preceded by Edmund O'Connor	New York State Senate; 24th District; 1894–1895	Succeeded by William C. Daley
