= List of women hymnwriters =

The following is a list of women hymnwriters, in order of their year of birth.

== Pre-1000 ==
- Kassia the Nun (b. Constantinople, c. 805-810 - d. Casos, 867)

== 1000-1100 ==
- Heloise (other names not known) (b. 1090–97; d. 16 May 1163/4)
- Hildegard of Bingen (b. Bermersheim vor der Höhe, 1098, d. Bingen am Rhein, 17 September 1179)

== 1200-1300 ==
- Mechthild of Magdeburg (ca. 1207 - ca. 1282)

== 1300-1400 ==
- Julian of Norwich (1342 - ca. 1416)

== 1500-1600 ==
- Elisabeth von Meseritz Cruciger, (b. Pomerania, ca.1500; d. Wittenberg 2 May, 1535)
- Teresa of Avila (b. Gotarrendura, Avila, Spain, 28 March 1515; d. Alba de Tormes, 4 October 1582)
- Christine of Hesse (b. Kassel, 29 June 1543 – d. Kiel, 13 May 1604)

== 1600-1700 ==
- Countess Emilie Juliane of Barby-Mühlingen (1637 – 1706)
- Jeanne Marie Guyon (b. Montargis, France, 16 April 1648; d. 9 January 1717)
- Elizabeth Singer Rowe (b. Ilchester, Somerset, 11 September 1674; d. Frome, Somerset, 20 February 1737)
- Catharina von Schlegel (1697 - after 1768)

== 1700-1750 ==
- Anna (Schindler) Dober (b. Kunewald, near Fulneck, Moravia, 9 April 1713; d. Marienborn, near Büdingen, Hesse, 12 December 1739)
- Anna Nitschmann (b. 24 November 1715; d. 21 May 1760)
- Anne Steele (1717 – 1778)
- Henriette Luise von Hayn (b. 22 May 1724; d. 27 August 1782)
- Birgitte Katerine Boye (b. Gentofte, Denmark, 7 March 1742; d. 17 October 1824)
- Anna Letitita Barbauld (b. Kibworth Harcourt, Leicestershire, 20 June 1743; d. Stoke Newington, London, 9 March 1825)

== 1750-1800 ==
- Joanna Southcott (b. Taleford, near Ottery St Mary, Devon, 25 April 1750; d. London, 27 December 1814)
- Judith Sargent Murray (b. Gloucester, Massachusetts, 1 May 1751; d. Natchez, Mississippi, 9 June 1820)
- Susanna Harrison (b. 1752; d. Ipswich, 3 August 1784)
- Helen Maria Williams (b. London, 17 June 1759; d. Paris, 15 December 1827)
- Harriet Auber (b. Spitalfields, London, 4 August 1773; d. Hoddesdon, Hertfordshire, 20 Jan 1862)
- Ann Griffiths (b. Llanfihangel, Montgomeryshire, April 1776; d. Llanfihangel, August 1805)
- Ann Taylor Gilbert (b. Islington, London, 30 January 1782, d. Nottingham, 20 December 1866)
- Phoebe Hinsdale Brown (b. Canaan, New York State, 1 May 1783; d. Henry, Marshall County, Illinois, 10 October 1861)
- Jane Taylor (b. Islington, 23 September 1783, d. Ongar, Essex, 13 April 1824)
- Charlotte Elliott (1789 – 1871)
- Mary (MacDougall) Macdonald (b. Ardtun, Isle of Mull, 1789; d. Ardtun, 21 May 1872)
- Sarah White Livermore (b. Wilton, New Hampshire, 20 July 1789; d. Wilton, 3 July 1874)
- Penina Moise (b. Charleston, South Carolina, 23 April 1797; d. Charleston, SC, 13 September 1880)
- Abigail Bradley Hyde (b. Stockbridge, Massachusetts, 28 September 1799; d. Andover, Connecticut, 7 April 1872)
- Henrietta Joan Fry (b. Bristol, 6 December 1799; d. Weston-super-Mare, Somerset, 1860)

== 1800-1850 ==
- Margaret Mackay (b. Inverness, Scotland, 1802; d. 5 January 1887)
- Sarah Flower Adams (b. Great Harlow, Essex, 22 February 1805; d. London, 14 August 1848)
- Emily Bowes (b. London, England, 10 Nov. 1806; d. Islington, London, 10 Feb. 1857)
- Harriet Burn McKeever (b. Philadelphia, Pennsylvania, 28 August 1807; d. Chester, Pennsylvania, 7 February 1886 or 1887)
- Margaret Cockburn-Campbell (b. 1808; d. Alphington, near Exeter, Devonshire, 6 February 1841)
- Eliza Westbury (b. Hackleton, Northamptonshire, 1808 (Baptized 22 May); d. 11 April 1828)
- Julia Anne Elliott (b. Hallsteads, Watermillock, Ullswater, 1809; d. England, 24 October 1841)
- Anne Houlditch Shepherd (b. Cowes, Isle of Wight, 11 September 1809; d. Blackheath, Kent, 7 January 1857)
- Jane Crewdson (b. Perran-ar-worthal, Cornwall, 22 October 1809; d. Whalley Range, Manchester, 14 September 1863)
- Catharine H. Esling (b. Philadelphia, Pennsylvania, 12 April 12, 1812; d. Philadelphia, 6 April 1897)
- Emma Leslie Toke (b. Holywood, near Belfast, 9 August 1812; d. Ryde, Isle of Wight, 29 September 1878)
- Lady Georgiana Charlotte (née Leveson-Gower) Fullerton (b. Tixhall Hall, Staffordshire, 23 September 1812; d. Bournemouth, Hampshire, 19 January 1885)
- Mary (Bowly) Peters (b. Cirencester, 17 April 1813; d. Clifton, Bristol, 29 July 1856)
- Jemima Luke (b. London, 19 August 1813; d. Newport, Isle of Wight, 2 February 1906)
- Mary Duncan (b. Kelso, 26 April 1814; d. Cleish, Kinross-shire, 5 January 1840)
- Lucy Akerman (b. Wrentham, Massachusetts, 21 February 1816; d. Providence, Rhode Island, 21 February 1874)
- Jane Montgomery Campbell (1817 – 1878)
- Elvina M. Hall (1818-1889)
- Elizabeth Payson Prentiss (b. Portland, Maine, 26 October 1818; d. Dorset, Vermont, 13 August 1878)
- Cecil Frances Alexander (1818 – 1895)
- Maria Frances Anderson (b. Paris, France, 30 January 1819; d. Rosemont, Pennsylvania, U.S., 13 October 1895)
- Julia Ward Howe (b. New York, 27 May 1819; d. Portsmouth, Rhode Island, 17 October 1910)
- Mary Fawler Maude (b. London, 25 October 1819; d. Overton, Cheshire, 30 July 1913)
- Fanny Crosby (1820 – 1915)
- Anne Thorton Brontë (b. near Bradford, Yorkshire, 17 January 1820; d. Scarborough, Yorkshire, 28 May 1849)
- Eliza F. Morris (b. London, 1821; d. Malvern Link, Worcestershire, 1874)
- Eliza Scudder (b. Barnstable, Massachusetts, 1821; d. Salem, Massachusetts, 1896)
- Charlotte Maria Tucker (b. Friern Hatch, Barnet, 8 May 1821; d Amritsar, India, 2 December 1893)
- Martha Matilda Stockton (b. Washington, North Carolina, 12 June 1821; d. Camden, New Jersey, 18 October 1885)
- Anna Laetitia Waring (1823 – 1910)
- Anne Ross Cundell Cousin (b. Hull, Yorkshire, 27 April 1824; d. Edinburgh, 6 December 1906)
- Adelaide Anne Procter (b. London, 30 October 1825; d. London, 2 February 1864)
- Julie Hausmann (b. Riga, Latvia, 7 March 1826; d. Wösso (now Võsu, Estonia), 15 August 1901)
- Mary Shekleton (b., place and date unknown, 1827; d. Dublin, 28 September 1883)
- Anna Bartlett Warner (b. New York, 31 August 1827; d. Constitution Island, 22 January 1915)
- Emma Frances Shuttleworth Bevan (b. Oxford, 25 September 1827; d. Cannes, France, 15 March 1909)
- Catherine Winkworth (1827 – 1878)
- Emily Sullivan Oakey (b. Albany, New York, U.S., 1829; d. Albany, 1883)
- Christina Rossetti (1830 – 1894)
- Elizabeth Cecilia Douglas Clephane (b. Edinburgh, 18 June 1830; d. Melrose, Roxburghshire, 19 February 1869)
- Adelaide Thrupp (b. London, 1831; d. Guildford, Surrey, 1908)
- Mary Bynon Reese (b. Pittsburgh, Pennsylvania, June 27, 1832; d. Everett, Washington, February 8, 1908)
- Lina Sandell-Berg (b. 3 October 1832; d. 27 July 1903)
- Mary Ann Sidebotham (b. London, 31 July 1833; d. Ryde, Isle of Wight, 20 February 1913)
- Marianne Farningham (b. Farningham, Kent, 17 Dec 1834; d. Barmouth, Merioneth, Wales, 16 March 1909)
- Anne Louise Ashley-Greenstreet (17 February 1835 – unknown)
- Eleonore (née Gräfin [Countess] zu Stolberg-Werningerode Reuss (b. Gedern am Vogelsberg, Hesse, 20 February 1835; d. Schloss Ilsenberg, near Bad Harzburg, 18 September 1903)
- Annie Sherwood Hawks (b. Hoosick, New York, 25 or 28 May 1835 or 1836; d. Bennington, Vermont, 3 January 1918)
- Frances Ridley Havergal (1836 – 1879)
- Annie Louisa Coghill (b. Brewood, Staffordshire, 23 June 1836; d. Bath, Somerset, 7 July 1907)
- E. S. Elliott (b. Brighton, Sussex, 22 July 1836; d. London, 3 August 1897)
- Elizabeth Wordsworth (b. Harrow, Middlesex, 22 June 1840; d. Oxford, 30 November 1932)
- Mary Artemisia Lathbury (1841-1913)
- Mary "May" Butler (b. 1841, Langar, near Bingham, Nottinghamshire; d. Shrewsbury, Shropshire, 6 January 1916)
- Ella Sophia Armitage (b. Liverpool, 3 March 1841; d. Leeds, 20 March 1931)
- Clara H. Scott (b. Elk Grove, Cook County, Illinois, 3 December 1841; d. Dubuque, Iowa, 21 June 1897)
- Isabella Stephana Stevenson (b. Cheltenham, Gloucestershire, 31 July 1843; d. Cheltenham, 28 April 1890)
- Lady Victoria Cecil Evans-Freke Carbury (b. 6 November 1843; d. 22 February 1932)
- Annie Herbert Barker (b. Leon, New York State, 1844; d. San Rafael, California, 21 January 1932)
- Constance Headlam Coote (b. Tunbridge Wells, Kent, 30 December 1844; d. Tunbridge Wells, 16 August 1936)
- Harriet Reynolds Krauth Spaeth (b. Baltimore, Maryland, 21 September 1845; d. Philadelphia, Pennsylvania, 5 May 1925)
- Jean Sophia Pigott (b. Leixlip, Ireland, 1845; d. Leixlip, Ireland, 1882)
- Bessie Porter Head (b. 1849/1850, exact date unknown; d. Wimbledon, Surrey, 28 June 1936)
- Caroline Maria Noel (b. Teston, Kent, England, 10 April 1817; d. St. Marylebone, Middlesex, England, 7 December 1877)
- Mary A. Kidder (b. Boston, Massachusetts, March 16, 1820; d. Chelsea, Massachusetts, November 25, 1905)

== 1850-1900 ==
- Eliza Edmunds Hewitt (b. Philadelphia, Pennsylvania, 28 June 1851; d. Philadelphia, 24 April 1920)
- Ellen Lakshmi Goreh (b. Benares (now Varanasi), India, 11 Sept 1853; d. Cawnpore (Kanpur), 1937)
- Carrie Elizabeth Ellis Breck (b. Walden, Vermont, 22 January 1855; d. Portland, Oregon, 27 March 1934)
- Geneviève Mary Irons (b. Brompton, London, 28 December 1855; d. Eastbourne, Sussex, 13 December 1928)
- Dorothy Frances Blomfield Gurney (b. London, 4 October 1858; d. London, 15 June 1932)
- Eleanor Henrietta Hull (b. Cheetham, Manchester, 15 Jan 1860; d. Wimbledon, Surrey, 13 Jan 1935)
- Ada Rundall Greenaway (1861-1937)
- Ada Ruth Habershon (b. Marylebone, London, 8 January 1861; d. London, 1 February 1918)
- Lelia Morris (b. Pennsville, Ohio, 15 April 1862; d. Auburn, Ohio, 23 July 1929)
- Adelaide Addison Pollard (b. Bloomfield, Iowa, 27 November 1862; d. New York City, 20 December 1934)
- Jessie Adams (b. Ipswich, Suffolk, 9 September 1863; d. York, 15 July 1954)
- Harriet (Hattie) Pierson (b. Canaan, New York, 1865; d. Sagaponack (a village in the Town of Southampton), New York, 25 February 1921)
- Civilla Durfee Holden Martin (b. Jordan, Nova Scotia, 21 August 1866; d. Atlanta, Georgia, 9 March 1948)
- Amy Carmichael (b. Millisle, Co Down, Ireland (later Northern Ireland), 16 December 1867; d. Tirunelveli, India, 18 January 1951)
- Laura L. Copenhaver (b. Columbus, Texas, 29 August 1868; d. Rosemont, Marion, Virginia, 18 December 1940)
- Alda Marguerite Milner-Barry (b. Scothorne (now Scothern), Lincolnshire, 18 August 1875; d. Weston-super-Mare, 15 April 1940)
- Frances Whitmarsh Wile (b. Bristol Centre, New York, 2 December 1878; d. Rochester, New York, 31 July 1939)
- Mary E. Byrne (b. Dublin, Ireland, 2 July 1880; d. Dublin, 19 January 1931)
- Eleanor Farjeon (b. Westminster, London, 13 February 1881; d. Hampstead, London, 5 June 1965)
- Lucie Eddie Campbell-Williams (b. Duck Hill, Mississippi, 30 April 1885; d. Nashville, Tennessee, 3 January 1963)
- Anna Bernardine Dorthy Hoppe (b. Milwaukee, Wisconsin, 7 May 1889; d. Milwaukee, 2 August 1941)
- Mary Susannah Edgar (b. Sundridge, Ontario, 23 May 1889; d. Toronto, 17 September 1973)
- Georgia Harkness (b. Harkness, New York (the town was named after her grandfather), 21 April 1891)
- Katherine Kennicott Davis (b. St Joseph, Missouri, 25 June 1892; d. Concord, Massachusetts, 20 April 1980)
- Maria Ferschl (b. Melk, Austria, 18 March 1895; d. Saulgau, Baden-Württemberg, 10 April 1982)
- Avis Christiansen (1895-1985)
- Helen Kim (b. Inchon, Korea, 27 February 1899; d. Seoul, Republic of Korea (South Korea), 10 February 1970)

== 1900-1950 ==
- Miriam (Leyrer) Drury (b. Santa Ana, California, 1900; d. Pasadena, California, 1985)
- Ruth Carter (b. Clapton, London, 22 August 1900; d. Clacton, Essex, 4 November 1982)
- Anastasia Van Burkalow (b. Buchanan, New York, 16 March 1911; d. Wantage, New Jersey, 14 January 2004)
- Maria Luise Thurmair (b. Bozen, Süd Tirol, Austria (now Bolzano, Alto Adige, Italy), 27 September 1912; d. Germering, München, 24 October 2005)
- Pilar Manalo Danao (b. Santa Ana, Manila, 10 March 1914: d. 26 November 1987)
- Honor Mary Thwaites (b. Young, New South Wales, Australia, 21 September 1914; d. Canberra, 24 November 1993)
- Anna Martina Gottschick (b. Dresden, 29 Sept 1914; d. Kassel. 8 Nov 1995)
- Margaret Clarkson (b. Melville, Saskatchewan, Canada, 8 June 1915; d. Toronto, 17 March 2008)
- Olive Adelaide (Wise) Spannaus (b. St Louis, Missouri, 23 January 1916; d. Seattle, Washington, 10 May 2018)
- Audrey Mae Mieir (b. Leechburg, Pennsylvania, 12 May 1916; d. 3 November 1996)
- Doris Akers (b. Brookfield, Missouri, 21 May 1922; d. Minneapolis, Minnesota, 26 July 1995)
- Estelle White (b. South Shields, County Durham (now in Tyne and Wear), 4 December 1925; d. 9 February 2011)
- Alice Parker (b. Boston, 16 December 1925)
- Jane McAfee Parker Huber (b. Jinan, China, 24 October 1926; d. Hanover, Indiana, 15 November 2008)
- Mary Louise Enigson VanDyke (b. Rochester, Pennsylvania, 28 Feb 1927)
- Catherine Cameron (b. St John, New Brunswick, Canada, 27 March 1927)
- Lois Clara Kroehler (b. Saint Louis, Missouri, 9 September 1927; d. Bremerton, Washington, 3 August 2019)
- Dosia Carlson (b. January 11, 1930, Huron, South Sakota; d. January 13, 2021)
- Cecily Taylor (b. Coulsdon, Surrey, 25 March 1930)
- Judith Beatrice O'Neill (b. Melbourne, Australia, 3 June 1930)
- Natalie Sleeth (1930-2002)
- Shirley Murray (b. Invercargill, New Zealand, 31 March 1931; d. Wellington, NZ, 25 January 2020)
- Jocelyn Mary Marshall (b. Morrinsville, Waikato, New Zealand, 15 September 1931)
- Carol Owens (b. El Reno, Oklahoma, 30 October 1931)
- Marian Collihole (. Pontypridd, Wales, 14 August 1933
- Dottie Rambo (b. Madisonville, Kentucky, 2 March 1934; d. Mount Vernon, Missouri, 11 May 2008)
- Eluned (Cornish) Harrison (b. Cardiff, South Wales, 19 December 1934)
- Jill Jenkins (b. Ealing, west London, 14 October 1937)
- Miriam Therese Winter (b. Passaic, New Jersey, 14 June 1938)
- Delores Dufner (b. near Buxton, North Dakota, 20 February 1939)
- Alison Margaret Robertson (b. Glasgow, 22 February 1940)
- Claire Cloninger (b. Lafayette, Louisiana, 12 August 1942; d. 15 August 2019)
- Simei Monteiro (b. Belém, Brazil, 28 December 1943)
- Ruth C. Duck (b. Washington, DC, 21 November 1944)
- Anna Briggs (b. Newcastle upon Tyne, 15 February 1947)

== 1950-present ==
- Kathy Galloway (b. Dumfries, Scotland, 6 August 1952)
- Marnie Barrell (b. Ashburton, New Zealand, 30 December 1952)
- Susan Palo Cherwien (b. Ashtabula, Ohio, 4 May 1954, d. 28 December 2021)
- Mary Louise Bringle (b. Ripley, Tennessee, 31 July 1953)
- Mary Yoke Thue Gan (. Jasin, Melaka, Malaysia, 14 November 1954)
- Sylvia Dunstan (b. Simcoe, Ontario, Canada, 26 May 1955; d. 25 July 1993)
- Elizabeth Smith (b. Stawell, Victoria, Australia, 27 February 1956)
- Maggi Eleanor Dawn (b. 1959)
- Geraldine Latty (b. 1963)
- Darlene Joyce Zscech (b. Brisbane, Queensland, Australia, 8 September 1965)
- Kristyn Getty (born 1980)
- Emma Turl (b. 1946)
