= Lloyd Stone =

American poet, illustrator, and composer

Lloyd Stone, 1954

Lloyd Stone (June 29, 1912 – March 9, 1993) was an American poet best known for the poem "This Is My Song". Stone was also an illustrator and composer.

== Early life ==
Lloyd Shelbourne Stone was born on June 29, 1912, in Coalinga, California. His parents, Lowends Columbus Stone and Gurtha Emalaine Marr were born in Missouri and married there in 1910 before moving to California. In California, Lowends Stone got a job as a "well puller" working for the Associated Oil Company of Coalinga, on the Shawmut lease. His mother worked as a seamstress. Stone attended Lindsay High School, Lindsay, California, graduating in 1930. He was president of his class in his junior year. He attended the University of Southern California (USC), majoring in music, and earning both Bachelor's and master's degrees. In 1936 he joined up with the E. K. Hernandez circus on its way to Hawaii. He did not stay with the circus for long, but did stay in Hawaii. After a short stint as a designer in a jewelry shop, he joined the staff at Kulamanu Studios as pianist-composer and teacher. While at Kulamanu Studios he composed a large part of their modern dance music. He taught orchestra and drama at the Honolulu Public Schools and poetry at the University of Hawaii. He designed and illustrated his own stationery and greeting cards.

== Writing career ==
The Hawaiian journal, The Islander praised his poetry: "Mr. Stone is probably among the most versatile contributors to the arts of whom Hawaii can boast. His poetry reflects Hawaii. He does not sing of the palms and the surf, but of the earthy human beauty which is the heritage of the islands. He finds his niche as an interpreter of that which lies beneath the lovely outward shell of Hawaii. He has made Hawaii his home. And Hawaii is fortunate."

In 1944 KGU News ran a poetry program entitled Lei of Hours, featuring Lloyd Stone and Don Blanding. In 1945 the Poets of the Pacific named Stone the Hawaiian Poet Laureate. The Legislature of the Territory of Hawaii passed a concurrent resolution in 1951 "bestowing the honor and title of poet laureate of Hawaii (Ka Haku-Mele O Hawaii)" on Lloyd Stone. In 1969 the World Congress of Poets declared Stone the Poet Laureate of Hawaii, and he received a bronze medal presented by then Philippine President Ferdinand Marcos.

In 1947 Stone was elected the president of the Poetry Theater of Honolulu. In 1946 he sponsored a poetry contest in which he published the winners in Hawaii Magazine of Verse of which he was an editor. In 1949 he fiscally sponsored another a poetry contest in Honolulu.

After spending many years in Hawaii, he alternated residency between California and Hawaii, spending six months of the year in each location. He was elected president of the California Federation of Chaparral Poets in 1981. Stone opposed California's term limits upon its poets laureate. While serving as third vice president of the organization, Stone attended the National Society of Arts and Letters World Congress in Seoul, Korea in July 1979, and he served as its literature chairman and diplomat chancellor for the conference in July 1981. He was a lifetime member of the National and World Poetry Day Committee, World Poetry Society International of India, belonged to the Ozark's Writers Guild, and was a fellow at the International Academy of Poets in Cambridge, England.

Lloyd Stone composed a musical based on Joyce Kilmer's poetry, and a production by the Golden Age Chorus aired on television in 1980.

== "This Is My Song" ==
Stone wrote "This Is My Song" around the time of his graduation from the University of Southern California. In 1934, Ira B. Wilson of the Lorenz Publishing Company set Stone's words to the hymn-like portion of Finlandia by Jean Sibelius. This arrangement was published under the title "A Song of Peace".

Because they are both set to the same music from Finlandia, "This Is My Song" / "A Song of Peace" is sometimes inaccurately called the "Finlandia Hymn". The Finlandia Hymn is more appropriately applied to the work that appeared seven years after A Song of Peace was published — when the words of the Finnish poet Veikko Koskenniemi were set to Sibelius's music.

Although his poem has appeared as a hymn in 26 hymnals, there is nothing that suggests Stone was particularly religious himself. By the late 1930s, "A Song of Peace" had become a favorite of the Wesleyan Service Guild of the Methodist Church. The executive secretary of the Guild, Marion Norris, asked Georgia Elma Harkness to give Lloyd Stone's poem a more Christian character. Harkness recalls writing her stanza sometime during the period 1937-39 while she was teaching at Mount Holyoke. It became the official hymn of the Wesleyan Service Guild. Not all hymnals include this third verse meant to "Christianize" the hymn. The poem was translated into 17 languages, and reprinted over 1 million times.

Secretary of Defense Lewis Johnson read Stone's poem "Song of Peace" at Arlington Cemetery, and the poem was also read as part of the Punchbowl War Memorial Cemetery dedication ceremony and American Association of University Women's 1950 convention in Wichita, Kansas. Ladybird Johnson recited the poem at the White House. The Missoula, Montana chapter of Veterans for Peace read the poem at their debut event on Veterans Day 2013.

== Works ==
=== Poems ===
- Stone, Lloyd "Seven Days" Esquire January 1938, p. 40. (appeared opposite F. Scott Fitzgerald's "Financing Finnegan.")

=== Books ===
- For You (with decorations by the author) (1937)—[original title For Me]
- The Story of an Ozark Grandmother: As the Grandmother, Jane Honey Howell Marr, Told her Story to her Grandson, Lloyd Stone. Point Lookout, Missouri self-illustrated (1938)
- Poems to Be Served with a Poi Cocktail (1940)
- Lei of Hours (1941)
- Hawaiian War Chant (October 1942)
- Aloha Means an Island (1944)
- In This Hawaiian Net (1945)
- Hawaiian Christmas (1945)
- Laughter Wears a Coconut Hat (1948)
- Escape to the Sun with illustrations by the author (1949)
- The Cave of Makalei: Old Hawaii Pageant Aloha Week (1958)
- Boy's Illustrated Book of Old Hawaiian Sports (na pa'ani kahiko) (1964)
- Christmas Luau (1976)
- San Joaquin Carols (1977)

=== Illustrations ===
- Keaka, the Hawaiian Fishboy by Max Keith, illustrated by Lloyd Stone
- Song Stories of Hawaii by Carol Roes with drawings by Lloyd Stone (1959)
- A Children’s Hawaiian Program: Eight Islands by Carol Roes, with drawings by Lloyd Stone (1963)

== Personal life ==
His father, Lowends, died in Lindsay in 1978. His mother, Gurtha, lived to be 100, dying in 1987. Stone died, age 80, in Lindsay, California, on March 9, 1993. His two-line obituary in the Fresno Bee described him as "a retired teacher", and made no mention of his poems, his being the poet laureate of Hawaii, or his well-known "Song of Peace".
