= Abby B. Hyde =

American hymnwriter (1799–1872)

Abigail Bradley Hyde
- Born: Abigail Bradley; September 28, 1799; Stockbridge, Massachusetts, U.S.
- Died: April 7, 1872 (aged 72); Andover, Connecticut, U.S.
- Occupation: hymnwriter
- Genre: religious music lyrics
- Subject: Christian hymns
- Notable works: "Dear Saviour, if these lambs should stray"
- Spouse: Lavius Hyde (m. 1818; died 1865)

Abby B. Hyde (née, Bradley; 1799–1872) was an American hymnwriter, who wrote the lyrics to at least 52 hymns. At an early age, she started writing poetry, and subsequently, sacred hymns. Some of these were first published without her name. Among American women to make contributions to its hymnology, she was one of the earliest.

Her Christian hymns were strongly evangelistic in tone, but unlike many hymns of that period which portrayed the anguish of hell and sought to terrify sinners into repentance, hers were more moderate and were marked by a calm persuasiveness which made them effective. In her day, nearly fifty of her poems were being sung in the U.S. It was to Asahel Nettleton's Village Hymns, 1824, and to Elias Nason's Collection, 1857, that the greater part of her hymns were contributed. Smith included Hyde's "Dear Saviour, if these lambs should stray" in his Songs from the Hearts of Women: One Hundred Famous Hymns and Their Writers (1903).

== Early life and education ==
Abigail (nickname, "Abby") Bradley was born at Stockbridge, Massachusetts, September 28, 1799. Her parents were Asahel Ives Bradley and Abigail Rogers. She was religiously trained, and at the age of 13, was admitted to the church directed by Dr. Stephen West, one of the theologians of the Hopkinsian school. During the next two years, she was influenced by the ministry of the Rev. Dr. Lyman Beecher, while at Miss Pierce's school, at Litchfield Hill, Connecticut.

She had a frail constitution, and her health from childhood was delicate.

== Career ==
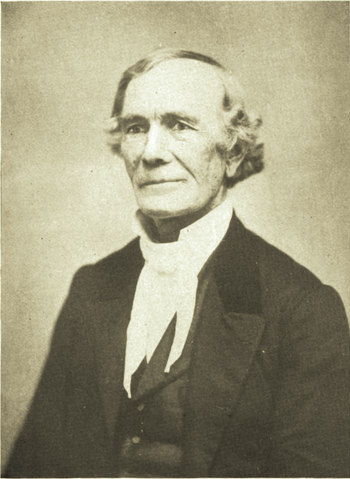
Lavius Hyde

On September 28, 1818, her nineteenth birthday, she married Rev. Lavius Hyde (1789–1865), formerly a teacher in her native town, but who a short time previously had been ordained to the Congregational ministry in Salisbury, Connecticut. They spent the four years following in Salisbury, where her husband was pastor. During the long years of her husband's life in the gospel ministry, Hyde was an efficient minister's wife.

In 1823, they removed to Bolton, Connecticut, where Rev. Hyde had charge of the Congregational Church. Here, the revivalist, Rev. Asahel Nettleton, just recovering from a severe attack of typhus, and was engaged in the preparation of the Village Hymns for Social Worship. Rev. Hyde read him two from a volume of Monthly Concert Hymns, selected by Dr. Leonard Bacon while a student at Andover Theological Seminary, "The trump of Israel's Jubilee", and "The Lord will not forget the grace". The stanzas had been selected from a poem written by Mrs. Hyde in 1821, "Address to Mr. Wolfe", and published in the Christian Intelligencer, New Haven, Connecticut, in 1822 or 1823, after a visit to Dr. and Mrs. Elias Cornelius at Salem, Massachusetts, who were full of enthusiasm respecting Dr. Joseph Wolff's labors in Palestine. Dr. Nettleton at once requested more from the same poet, and received quite a number, of which, "Dear Saviour, if these Lambs should Stray," "Say, Sinner, hath a Voice Within," and "Shepherd who Leadest with tender Care," were perhaps most widely used. Nettleton wrote to her during the later years of his life, "I know of none which have been more useful". At Nettleton request, she wrote and contributed, in addition to Nos. 463 and 470, seven hymns, Nos. 42, 303, 333, 335, 337, 449, and 482; 34 more were given in the revised and enlarged edition of the same, in 1851. An additional hymn appeared in Nason's Congregational Hymn Book (1857).

In 1831, the Hydes removed to Ellington, Connecticut, where Rev. Hyde had charge of the Congregational Church. This was the home of Phoebe Hinsdale Brown when she wrote, "I love to steal awhile away". It was here that the two women met and formed an acquaintance which continued for many years.

On July 22, 1835, Rev. Hyde became pastor of the Evangelical Trinitarian Church in Wayland, Massachusetts. Subsequently, they removed to Becket, Massachusetts. In 1849, they returned Bolton for ten years more of pastoral service, till Rev. Hyde resigned his charge at the age of 70. Lastly, they lived at Vernon, Connecticut (1860–1865), until the death of Rev. Hyde.

A few of Hyde's pieces can be highly commended, but many changes have taken place in hymnology, and only two of her hymns were admitted in the more modern hymnals. One of her earlier hymns, "And Canst Thou, Sinner, Slight", was once popular in the U.S., and was favored with places in several hymnbooks in Great Britain. The other hymn, "Dear Saviour, if these lambs should stray", is a "Prayer for the Children of the Church", which is touching in sentiment. Hyde was especially fond of children, and as a pastor's wife probably her most effective work was done among them. "Dear Saviour, if these lambs should stray" is her most beautiful hymn, and the one found most often found in the modern hymnbook. It was written in Hyde's early twenties, and begins with the lines:—

Dear Saviour, if these lambs should stray
From Thy secure inclosure's bound,

== Personal life ==
The years of her widowhood were passed among her four surviving children (other four having died), and chiefly at the home of her only son, in Andover, Connecticut, where she died on April 7, 1872, and was buried at Ellington Center Cemetery, Ellington, Connecticut.

== Selected works ==
=== Contributor ===
- Hymns & Sacred Songs for the Monthly Concert, by Leonard Bacon, 1823
- Village Hymns, by Asahel Nettleton, 1824
- Congregational Hymn Book, by Elias Nason, 1857
