= Canaan, New York =

- Town
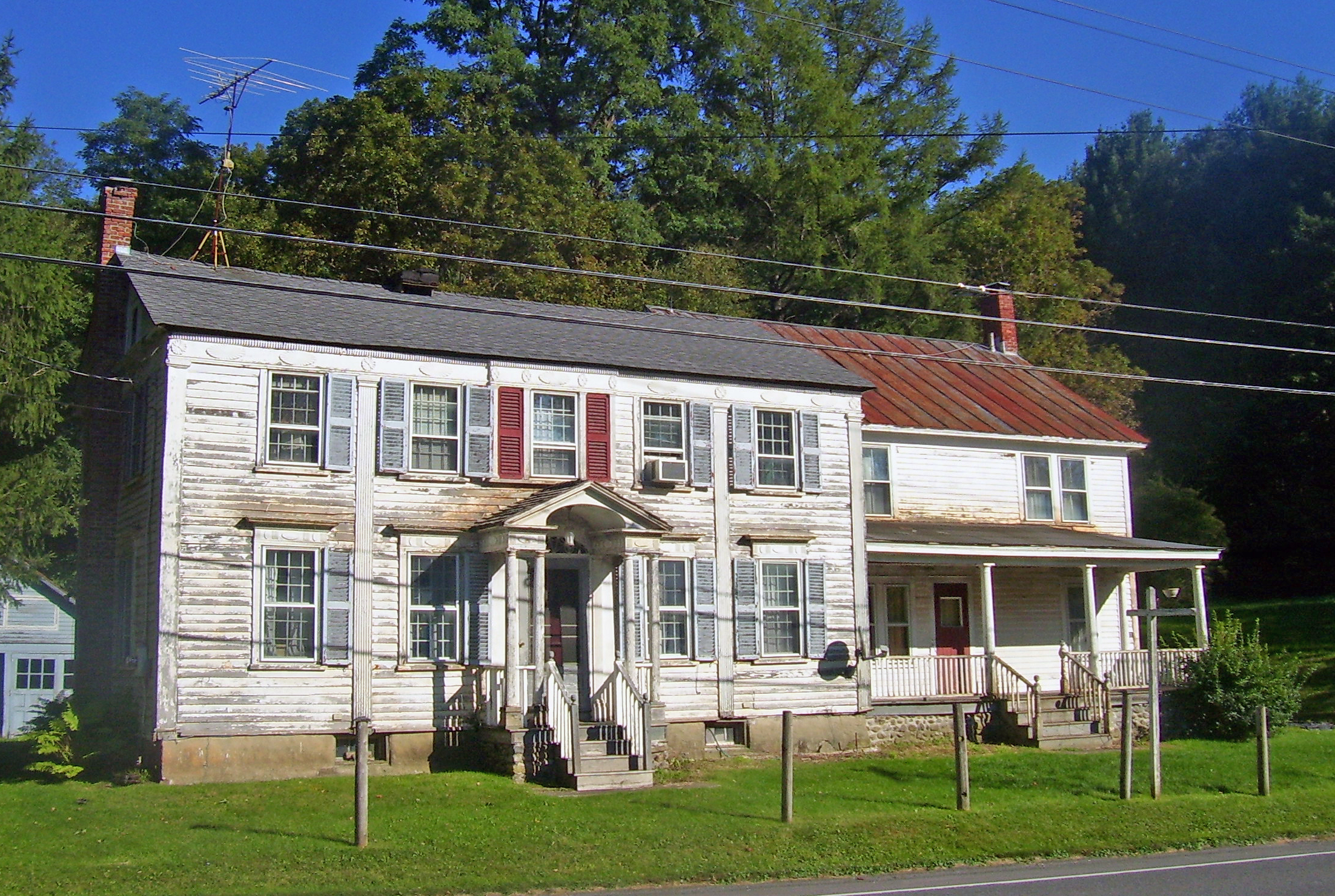
- The Lace House in Canaan

- Location of Canaan, New York
- Coordinates: 42°24′7″N 73°26′47″W
- Country: United States
- State: New York
- County: Columbia

Government
  - Type: Town council
  - Town supervisor: Brenda Adams (D)
  - Town board: List: • Ginny Nightingale (D); • Brian Lifsec (D); • Victoria Mills (D); • Frank Wood (I)

Area
  - Total: 36.93 sq mi (95.65 km^{2})
  - Land: 36.65 sq mi (94.93 km^{2})
  - Water: 0.28 sq mi (0.72 km^{2})
- Elevation: 981 ft (299 m)

Population (2020)
  - Total: 1,570
  - Density: 42.8/sq mi (16.5/km^{2})
- Time zone: UTC-5 (Eastern (EST))
  - Summer (DST): UTC-4 (EDT)
- ZIP Codes: 12029 (Canaan); 12060 (East Chatham); 12017 (Austerlitz)
- Area code: 518
- FIPS code: 36-021-12056
- GNIS feature ID: 0978781
- Website: canaannewyork.org

Canaan is a town in Columbia County, New York, United States. The population was 1,570 at the 2020 census, down from 1,710 at the 2010 census. The town is in the northeastern part of the county.

== History ==
The first settlers arrived around 1759. The town was founded in 1772 as "Kings District". The name was changed to "Canaan" in 1788. One of the oldest sections of Canaan is Frisbie Street, settled in 1770 by Gideon Frisbie, an immigrant from Canaan, Connecticut. Frisbie Street fronts what was once the Albany-Boston stagecoach route.

At approximately 1 p.m. (EDT) on August 28, 1973, an F4 tornado touched down in Canaan and moved in a south-southeast direction across the Massachusetts state line into the town of West Stockbridge, Massachusetts. It caused significant damage to the Berkshire Farm for Boys in Canaan then "obliterated" nearly every house in its path in West Stockbridge. Finally, it leveled the Berkshire Truck Stop on Massachusetts Route 102 near the Massachusetts Turnpike, overturning and throwing trucks and cars and ripping gas pumps out of their stands. When it was over, four people had been killed (including three at the truck stop), 36 were injured, and approximately $25 million ($148 million, 2021 USD) in damage had been done.

The Lace House was listed on the National Register of Historic Places in 1985.

== Geography ==
According to the United States Census Bureau, the town has a total area of 36.9 square miles (95.7 km^{2}), of which 36.7 square miles (95.0 km^{2}) is land and 0.27 square miles (0.7 km^{2}), or 0.76%, is water. The majority of the town drains westward or northward via tributaries of Kinderhook Creek to the Hudson River, notably Queechy Lake Brook and Buttercup Creek, both of which flow into the Stony Kill. The southeastern corner of the town drains via Flat Brook into the Williams River in Massachusetts and thence to the Housatonic River, which flows south into Connecticut.

The eastern town line is the border of Massachusetts.

Interstate 90 passes through the town, connecting the Massachusetts Turnpike to the east with the New York State Thruway to the west. I-90 has one interchange in the town, with New York State Route 22.

The Taconic Mountains rise in the northeastern corner of the town.

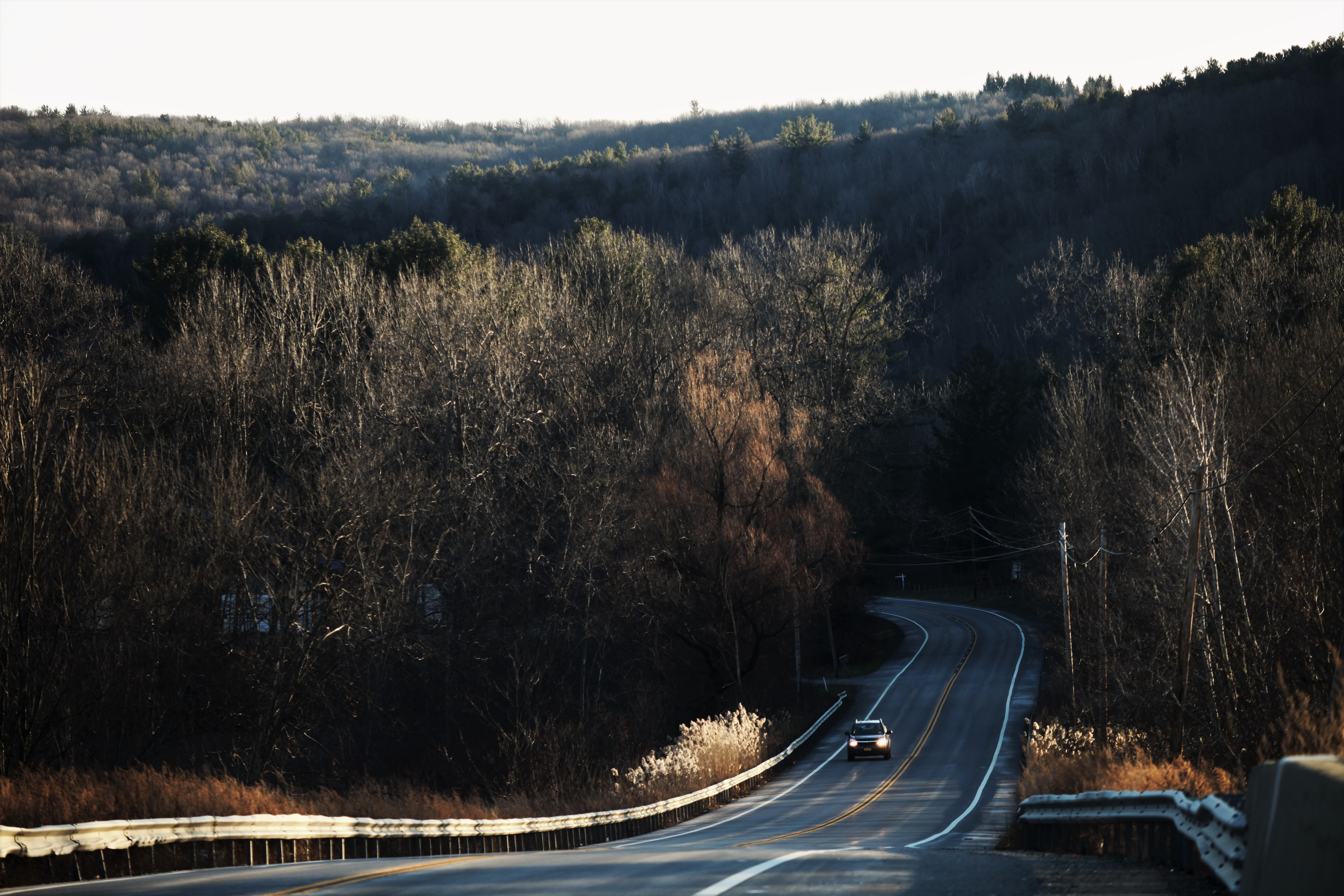
The Taconic Mountain area countryside on NY-22 near Edwards Park Road, Canaan, New York.

== Demographics ==
Historical population
Census	Pop.	Note	%±
1820	2,079		—
1830	2,064		−0.7%
1840	1,957		−5.2%
1850	1,941		−0.8%
1860	2,197		13.2%
1870	1,877		−14.6%
1880	1,654		−11.9%
1890	1,561		−5.6%
1900	1,307		−16.3%
1910	1,167		−10.7%
1920	1,085		−7.0%
1930	979		−9.8%
1940	1,042		6.4%
1950	1,284		23.2%
1960	1,272		−0.9%
1970	1,472		15.7%
1980	1,654		12.4%
1990	1,773		7.2%
2000	1,820		2.7%
2010	1,710		−6.0%
2020	1,570		−8.2%
U.S. Decennial Census 2020

As of the census of 2000, there were 1,820 people, 643 households, and 414 families residing in the town. The population density was 49.6 inhabitants per square mile (19.2/km^{2}). There were 970 housing units at an average density of 26.4 per square mile (10.2/km^{2}). The racial makeup of the town was 87.80% White, 8.63% African American, 0.33% Native American, 0.66% Asian, 1.21% from other races, and 1.37% from two or more races. Hispanic or Latino of any race were 2.25% of the population.

There were 643 households, out of which 27.1% had children under the age of 18 living with them, 55.5% were married couples living together, 5.4% had a female householder with no husband present, and 35.5% were non-families. 28.6% of all households were made up of individuals, and 11.7% had someone living alone who was 65 years of age or older. The average household size was 2.34 and the average family size was 2.88.

In the town, the population was spread out, with 34.2% under the age of 18, 4.3% from 18 to 24, 20.9% from 25 to 44, 26.5% from 45 to 64, and 14.0% who were 65 years of age or older. The median age was 38 years. For every 100 females, there were 137.3 males. For every 100 females age 18 and over, there were 103.2 males.

The median income for a household in the town was $51,607, and the median income for a family was $62,656. Males had a median income of $44,063 versus $37,083 for females. The per capita income for the town was $28,209. About 2.7% of families and 5.1% of the population were below the poverty line, including 4.1% of those under age 18 and 5.4% of those age 65 or over.

== Communities and locations in Canaan ==
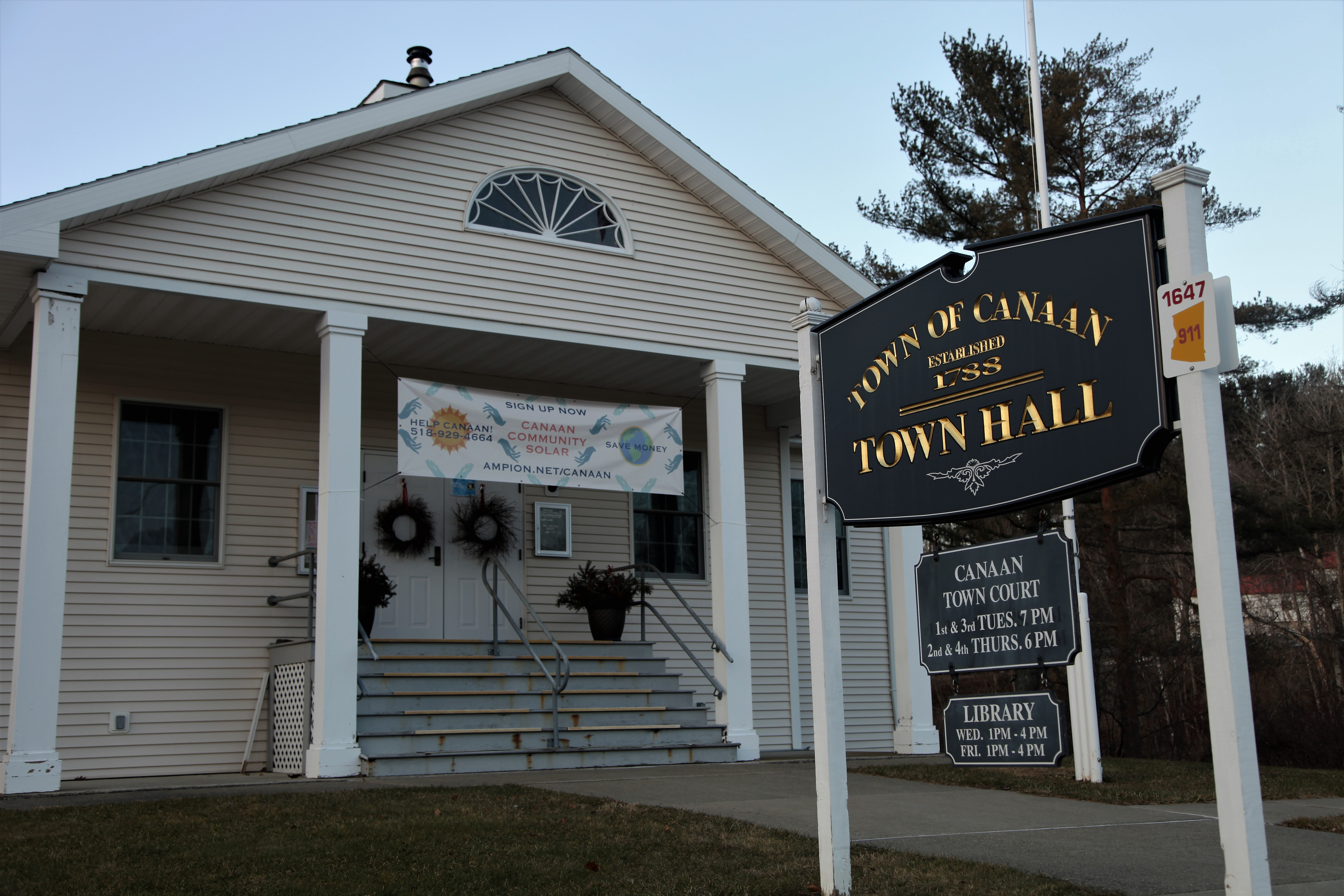
Canaan Town Hall

- Canaan – The hamlet of Canaan is in the north-central part of the town at the junction of New York State Route 295 and County Road 5. It was formerly "Canaan Corners".
- Canaan Center – A hamlet south of Canaan village on Route 5, just south of the geographic center of the town.
- East Chatham – A hamlet at the western town line.
- Edwards Park – A location southeast of Flatbrook.
- Flatbrook – A hamlet southeast of Canaan village and located on Route 22.
- Queechy – A hamlet east of Canaan village
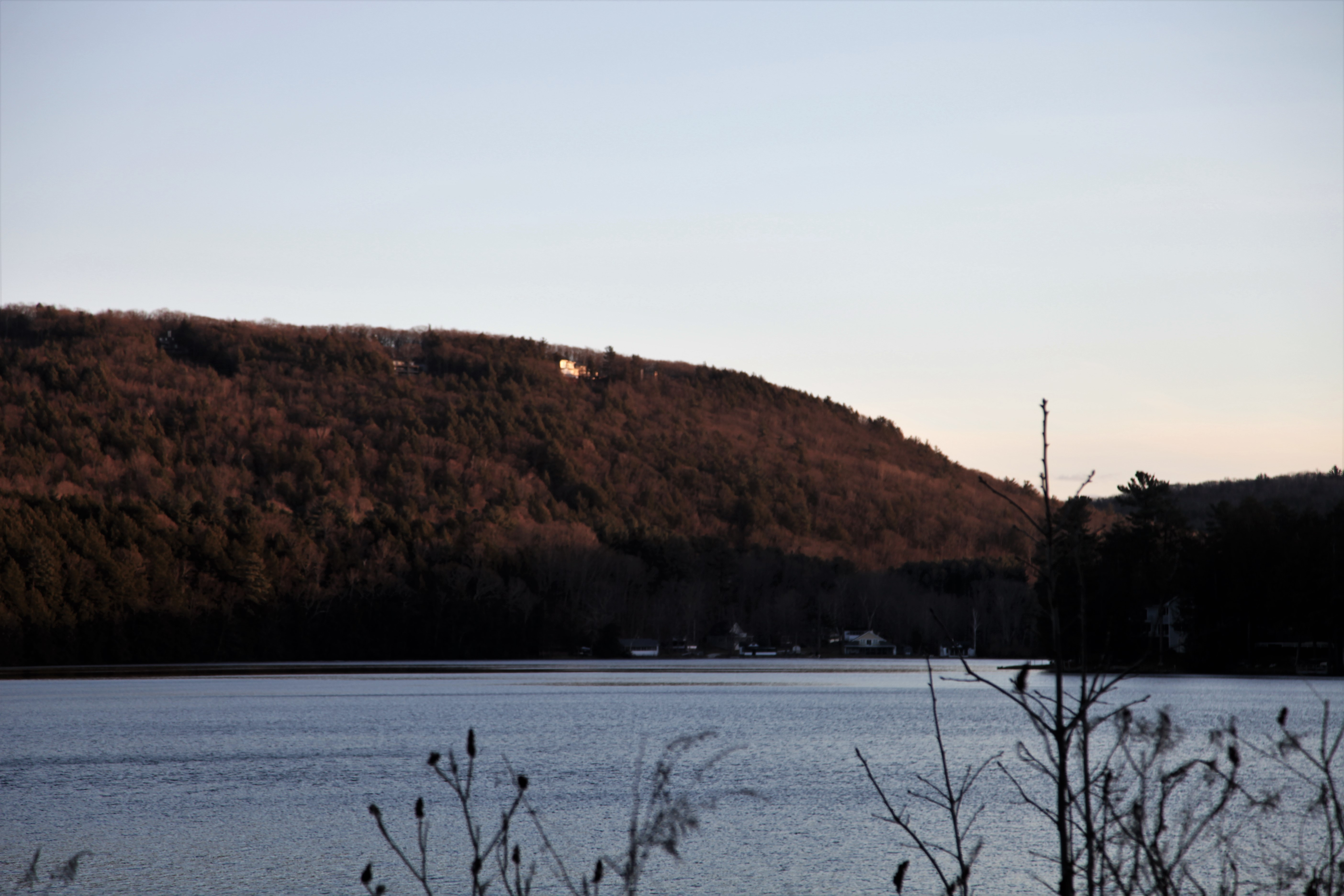
  Queechy Lake seen from Queechy Lake Drive in Canaan, New York, December 23, 2021.
  Queechy Lake – (formerly Whiting's Pond) A 600-acre (2.4 km^{2}) lake near the eastern town boundary.
- Red Rock – A hamlet at the southern town line.

== Notable people ==
- Phoebe Hinsdale Brown (1783–1861), first American woman to write a hymn of wide popularity, "I love to steal awhile away"
- Asa Adgate (1767–1832), born in Canaan, U.S. congressman
- Daniel G. Garnsey, U.S. congressman
- Anne Meacham (1925–2006), American actress
- Eleazer Root (1802–1887), born in Canaan, educator and Episcopal priest
- Al Roker (born August 20, 1954) television personality, weather forecaster, actor, and author (owns a summer home in Canaan)
- Henry L. Warner, farmer and member of the New York State Assembly in 1892
