= Lace House =

Lace House may refer to:

in the United States

- Lace House (Canaan, New York), listed on the National Register of Historic Places (NRHP)
- Lace House (Columbia, South Carolina), listed on the NRHP in Columbia, South Carolina
