= Finlandia hymn =

Section of Sibelius' Finlandia

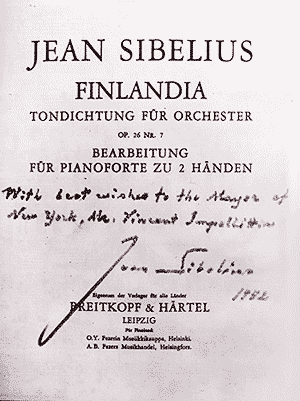
First edition of the reduction of Sibelius Finlandia

The Finlandia hymn (Finnish: Finlandia-hymni) refers to a serene hymn-like section of the patriotic symphonic poem Finlandia, written in 1899 and 1900 by the Finnish composer Jean Sibelius. It was later re-worked by the composer into a stand-alone piece. With words written in 1940 by Veikko Antero Koskenniemi, it is one of the most important national songs of Finland. Although not the official national anthem of Finland, it has been continuously proposed as such.

Other major uses of the tune include several Christian hymns and other national songs.

== Finnish national song ==
After the success of the full-length symphonic poem (most of which consists of rousing and turbulent passages, evoking the national struggle of the Finnish people), Sibelius published a stand-alone version of the hymn as the last of twelve numbers in his Masonic Ritual Music, Op. 113, with a text by opera singer Wäinö Sola. The version usually heard today has lyrics written by Koskenniemi in 1940 and was first performed in 1941. Sibelius himself arranged the hymn for choral performances. Today, during modern performances of Finlandia in its entirety, a choir is sometimes involved, singing the Finnish lyrics with the hymn section.

V.A. Koskenniemi's original Finnish language lyrics to Finlandia hymn:

Oi Suomi katso sinun päiväs koittaa. Yön uhka karkoitettu on jo pois.
Ja aamun kiuru kirkkaudessa soittaa, kuin itse taivahan kansi sois.
Yön vallat aamun valkeus jo voittaa. Sun päiväs koittaa oi synnyinmaa.
Oi nouse Suomi nosta korkealle, pääs seppelöimä suurten muistojen.
Oi nouse Suomi näytit maailmalle, sa että karkoitit orjuuden.
Ja ettet taipunut sa sorron alle. On aamus alkanut synnyinmaa.

The Finlandia hymn is often proposed as an official national song or anthem of Finland.

== English language uses ==
In 1934, Lloyd Stone wrote "This is my song", to the Finlandia tune, as an international song of peace. An expanded version with Christian themes by a later author appears in many hymnals. Conductor Leopold Stokowski proposed using the melody for a worldwide anthem.

Many other Christian hymns are set to the tune, among those in widespread use across English-speaking denominations are "Be still, my soul" and "We rest on Thee, our shield and our defender".

=== "Be still, my soul" ===
The Christian hymn "Be still, my soul", written in German ("Stille mein Wille, dein Jesus hilft siegen") in 1752 by the Lutheran hymnwriter Catharina von Schlegel (1697–1777) and translated into English in 1855 by Jane Laurie Borthwick (1813–1897), is usually sung to this tune. It begins:

Be still, my soul, the Lord is on thy side;
Bear patiently the cross of grief or pain.
Leave to thy God to order and provide;
In every change He faithful will remain.
Be still, my soul, thy best, thy heavenly friend
Through thorny ways leads to a joyful end.

=== "We rest on Thee" ===
The hymn "We rest on Thee", written by Edith G. Cherry around 1895, is also commonly sung to the tune. Its first verse is:

We rest on Thee, our Shield and our Defender!
We go not forth alone against the foe;
Strong in Thy strength, safe in Thy keeping tender,
We rest on Thee, and in Thy Name we go.
Strong in Thy strength, safe in Thy keeping tender,
We rest on Thee, and in Thy Name we go.

== Other language uses ==
The opening bars of Gweddi dros Gymru, sung in Welsh by John Eifion and Côr Penyberth

The popular Welsh language hymn Gweddi dros Gymru ("A prayer for Wales") also known by its incipit Dros Gymru'n gwlad, was written by Baptist pastor and Welsh nationalist politician, Lewis Valentine (1893–1986). The hymn was also popularly sung by singer and politician Dafydd Iwan in 1986.

Welsh lyrics	Literal English translation
Dros Gymru'n gwlad, O Dad, dyrchafwn gri, Y winllan wen a roed i’n gofal ni; D'amddiffyn cryf a'i cadwo'n ffyddlon byth, A boed i'r gwir a'r glân gael ynddi nyth; Er mwyn dy Fab a'i prynodd iddo'i hun, O crea hi yn Gymru ar dy lun. O deued dydd pan fo awelon Duw; Yn chwythu eto dros ein herwau gwyw, A'r crindir cras dan ras cawodydd nef Yn erddi Crist, yn ffrwythlon iddo ef, A'n heniaith fwyn â gorfoleddus hoen Yn seinio fry haeddiannau'r addfwyn Oen.	For Wales our country, O Father, I raise a lament, This blessed vineyard which was given unto our care; May you protect her vigorously and keep her forever faithful, And let the true and pure find in her a nest; For your Son who redeemed her for himself, O create her as a Wales in your image. O let there come a day when the breezes of God; Are once again blowing over our withered acres, And the arid parched land under the grace of showers from heaven Is as gardens of Christ, fruitful unto Him; And our dear old language with a joyful vigour Rings out on high the merits of the Gentle Lamb.

The tune was also adopted for Biafra's national anthem, Land of the Rising Sun, during its short-lived secession from Nigeria in the late 1960s.

In the Netherlands the song is known as a Christian hymn with Dutch lyrics by Jan Molenaar Ik bouw op U, mijn schild en mijn verlosser which can be found as song nr.124 in the Opwekkingsliederen songbook.

On a smaller scale it also serves as the tune for the songs of various colleges and schools.
