= Aaron B. Gardenier =

American politician (1848–1909)

Aaron Benedict Gardenier (September 26, 1848 – June 18, 1909) was an American lawyer and politician from New York.

== Life ==
Gardenier was born on September 26, 1848, in Kinderhook, New York, the son of farmer David William Gardenier and Elizabeth Ann Benedict.

Gardenier attended the Tacomic Institute in Lanesboro, Massachusetts, the Seaside Institute in West Haven, Connecticut, and Yale Law School. He graduated from the latter school in 1871. He returned to his home town and practiced law there for the next several years in the firm Gardenier & Barrett. He later became associated with Sanford W. Smith as part of the law firm Gardenier & Smith. He worked as attorney for the New York Central Railway Company for several years. He initially practiced in Valatie, but in 1890 he moved to Chatham.

Gardenier served as District Attorney of Columbia County for three terms, beginning in 1880. In 1889, he was elected to the New York State Assembly as a Republican, representing Columbia County. He served in the Assembly in 1890, 1891, and 1895.

Gardenier was a prominent member of the Knights of Pythias, serving as Supreme Representative from the Grand Domain of New York, Supreme Master-at-Arms from 1894 to 1896, and chairman of the Judiciary Committee of the Supreme Lodge. He was also a member of the Freemasons, the Royal Arch Masonry, the Knights Templar, the Scottish Rite, and the Shriners. In 1876, he married Elizabeth Gordon Rathbone of Valatie. They had one surviving son, David W.

Gardenier died at home on June 18, 1909. He was buried in the family plot in Valatie.

New York State Assembly
Preceded by William Dinehart	New York State Assembly; Columbia County; 1890–1891	Succeeded by Henry L. Warner
Preceded by Jacob H. Hoysradt	New York State Assembly; Columbia County; 1895	Succeeded by Hugh W. McClellan
