= Land of the Rising Sun (anthem) =

National anthem of Biafra

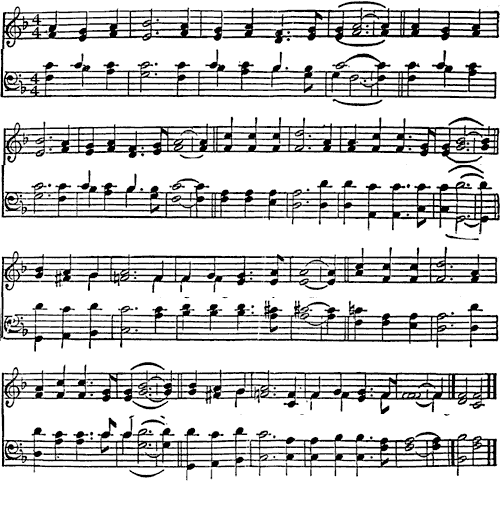
- Sheet music
- National anthem of Biafra
- Lyrics: Nnamdi Azikiwe
- Music: Jean Sibelius
- Adopted: 1967
- Relinquished: 1970

Audio sample
- "Land of the Rising Sun": file; help

Land of the Rising Sun was the proclaimed national anthem of the secessionist African state of Biafra, formerly known as Eastern Region, Nigeria. The lyrics were written by Nnamdi Azikiwe, and the tune was adopted from Jean Sibelius' "Finlandia", as Biafran president Emeka Ojukwu enjoyed the musical works of Sibelius.

== Lyrics ==
Land of the rising sun, we love and cherish,
Beloved homeland of our brave heroes;
We must defend our lives or we shall perish,
We shall protect our hearts from all our foes;
But if the price is death for all we hold dear,
Then let us die without a shred of fear.

Hail to Biafra, consecrated nation,
O fatherland, this be our solemn pledge:
Defending thee shall be a dedication,
Spilling our blood we’ll count a privilege;
The waving standard which emboldens the free
Shall always be our flag of liberty.

We shall emerge triumphant from this ordeal,
And through the crucible unscathed we’ll pass;
When we are poised the wounds of battle to heal,
We shall remember those who died in mass;
Then shall our trumpets peal the glorious song
Of victory we scored o’er might and wrong.

Oh God, protect us from the hidden pitfall,
Guide all our movements lest we go astray;
Give us the strength to heed the humanist call:
To give and not to count the cost’ each day;
Bless those who rule to serve with resoluteness,
To make this clime a land of righteousness.
