= Phoebe Hinsdale Brown =

American hymnwriter (1783–1861)

- Born: Phoebe Hinsdale; May 1, 1783; Canaan, New York, U.S.
- Died: October 10, 1861 (aged 78); Henry, Illinois, U.S.
- Occupation: hymnwriter
- Spouse: Timothy H. Brown (m. 1805; died 1854)
- Children: Son, Samuel Robbins Brown. Three daughters.
- Writing career
- Pen name: B.
- Language: English
- Genre: hymns
- Subject: Christianity
- Notable work: "I love to steal awhile away"

Phoebe Hinsdale Brown (née, Hinsdale; pen name, B.; May 1, 1783 – October 10, 1861) was one of the first notable American woman hymnwriters. She was a frequent contributor to the periodical press. Brown was the first American woman to write a hymn of wide popularity, "I love to steal awhile away".

== Early years and education ==
Phoebe (sometimes spelled, "Phebe") Hinsdale was born at Canaan, New York, May 1, 1783. Her parents had been attached to the Episcopal church. The father, George Hinsdale, was the reputed composer of the psalm-tune, "Hinsdale". He died when Brown was only ten months old, followed by the death of the widowed mother at the close of the next year. Her grandfather, Allen, took charge of the young orphan. Mr. and Mrs. Allen died when Brown was ten years old. She then moved to the home of her sister (at Claverack, New York), whose husband was the keeper of a county prison. Here, she remained for the next eight years, treated more as a servant than as a sister.

Brown had no schooling during her first eighteen years, and was not even able to write her name. At the age of eighteen, she left her sister's home, and attended the district school at Claverack for three months, where she learned to write. In 1801, she went to live with the Whiting family in her native town, where she was treated as a daughter, and where, in the same year, she became a member of the Congregational church.

== Career ==
In 1805, she married Timothy H. Brown, a house-painter of East Windsor, Connecticut. Two of her children were born in that town. After the Browns removed to Ellington, Connecticut, two more children were born to them. In Ellington, Brown became familiar with one of the Native Americans of the forest, still lingering in the East, of whom she gave an account in a Tract, called, "Poor Sarah, or the Indian Woman," published as Number 128, by the American Tract Society, New York.

Brown became a frequent contributor to the periodical press. Several of her contributions appeared in the Religious Intelligencer, published by Deacon Nathan Whiting, at New Haven, Connecticut. In The Pearl, published at Hartford, Connecticut, appeared her "Tales of Real Life," and several of her pieces of poetry. She published two Sunday school books, called The Village School, and The Tree and its Fruits. The former of these two volumes described her own experience as a school teacher; the latter illustrated, by a series of tales from real life, the troubles associated with gambling.

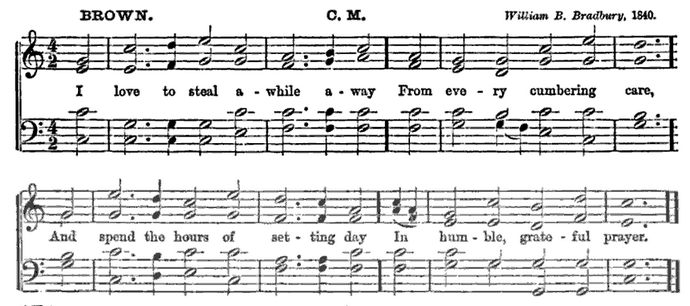
"I love to steal awhile away" (1818)

In 1818, Brown was living at Ellington in a small, unfinished house, caring for four little children and a sick sister. In order to gain a little quiet for her own private devotions, she would go out at sunset to the boundaries of a beautiful garden in the neighborhood in which stood one of the finest residences of the town. There, she rested a while and spoke to God. The lady of the mansion, observing Brown's actions, misinterpreted them, and rudely rebuked her as an intruder. Brown withdrew in tears, and went to her home where she wrote "An Apology for my Twilight Rambles", which she sent to her critic. This "apology", slightly amended, became the hymn, "I love to steal awhile away", first published by Rev. Asahel Nettleton. along with three other hymns by Brown in Nettleton's Village Hymns, 1824, with the signature "B".

In 1819, Brown wrote two hymns which were overlooked by Nettleton, and did not appear till 1831 in Thomas Hastings's Spiritual Songs. These were, "How sweet the melting lay. Morning." and "0 Lord, Thy work revive. For a Revival." Both are found in Lyra Sacra Americana, pp. 28–30. The second of these was altered by the author for Elias Nason's Congregational Hymn Book, 1857. This, according to Nason, was her authorized text. It was widely used in the U.S., and was also found in a few English collections, including Andrew Reed's Hymn Book and the New Congregational Hymn Book, and sometimes was attributed in error to Hastings. Browns' later hymns were: "Great God, we would to Thee make known", which appeared in the Mother's Hymn Book, 1834; "We come. 0 Lord, before Thy throne. For Suitors."; "Grant the abundance of the sea. For Sailors", two hymns for sailors, which appeared in Linsley and Davis' Select Hymns, 1830; "Assembled at [round] Thine altar, Lord. Holy Communion", which also appeared in the Select Hymns, 1834, and was altered for Nason's Cong. H. Bk., 1857; and "Jesus, this mid-day hour. Soon", which was written by special request for the "Fulton Street [Noon] Prayer Meeting", about 1857. In addition to the foregoing, there were four hymns by her in Parish Hymns (Philadelphia), 1843; and there may be many others in various collections which were uncredited.

At the age of seventy, two years before her death, she wrote out, in a small volume, a fair copy of her numerous hymns and other poetical effusions, noting the occasion, time and place of such compositions, and the date of their first publication.

== Personal life, death, legacy ==
She became friends with another hymnwriter, Abby B. Hyde, in 1831.

Brown's marriage was not a happy one. After living for 30 years in Monson, Massachusetts, she was widowed in 1854, and moved into the home of her only son, Samuel Robbins Brown, D. D., who had returned from China, and had become the pastor of the Owasco Outlet Reformed Church, near Auburn, New York. On his departure in 1859 to Japan, he being the first American missionary to enter Japan, Brown moved to the home of her daughter Hannah, the wife of Deacon Elijah Smith, who, with her only surviving sister, was residing at Henry, Illinois. There, she lived until her death, October 10, 1861, at the age of 79.

The Rev. Charles Hammond, who was for some years a member of her family, had in his possession her autobiography, a manuscript volume of 412 pages, as well as a volume of her poems, which he had collected from her manuscripts and newspaper slips, which was nearly as large. He noted that from her letters and diaries and prose papers yet unpublished, another manuscript volume of equal size could be made. He died before publishing these works.

== Selected works ==
- "As once the Saviour took His seat."
- "Go, messenger of love, and bear."
- "I love to steal awhile away."
- "Welcome, ye hopeful heirs of heaven."
- "How sweet the melting lay."
- "0 Lord, Thy work revive. For a Revival."
- "Great God, we would to Thee make known."
- "We come, 0 Lord, before Thy throne."
- "Grant the abundance of the sea."
- "Assembled at [round] Thine altar, Lord."
- "Jesus, this mid-day hour."
