= This is my song (1934 song) =

Poem by Lloyd Stone turned song

- Genre: Hymn
- Written: 1934
- Text: Lloyd Stone and Georgia Harkness
- Based on: Matthew 6:9-13
- Meter: 11.10.11.10.11.10
- Melody: "Finlandia" by Jean Sibelius

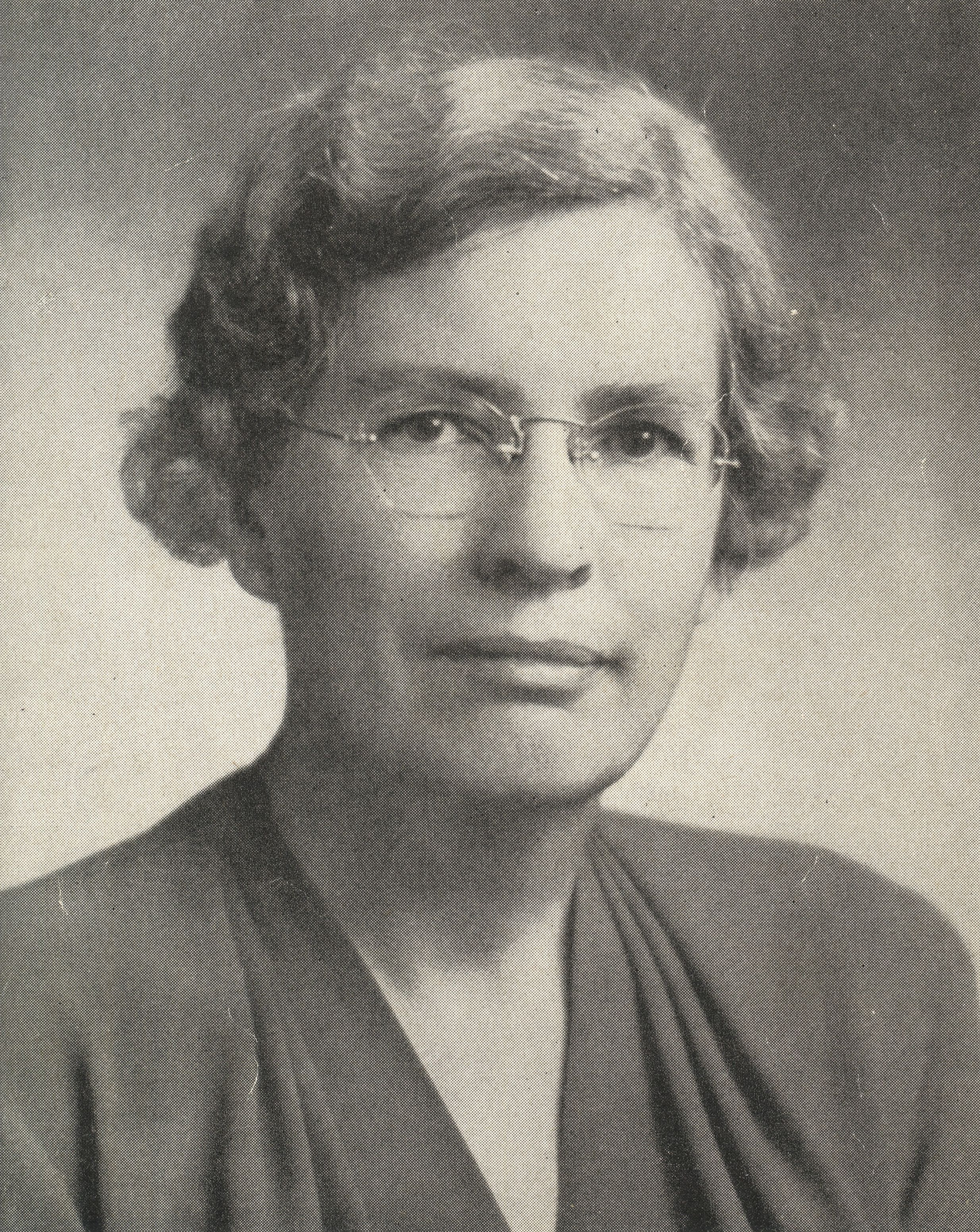
Georgia Harkness

"A Song of Peace: A Patriotic Song", also known by its incipit, "This is my song", is a poem written by Lloyd Stone (1912–1993). Lloyd Stone's words were set to the Finlandia hymn melody composed by Jean Sibelius in an a cappella arrangement by Ira B. Wilson that was published by the Lorenz Publishing Company in 1934.

== Alternative versions ==
It often appears in hymnals with substituted and additional verses by Georgia Harkness (1891–1974).

Joan Baez has performed Finlandia at her concerts, with lyrics credited to her based on the text of This is my song by Lloyd Stone. She also featured Finlandia Hymn on her 2005 live album Bowery Songs and a live performance of the song by Baez also appeared on the album Mitä vapaus on, a compilation of protest songs by various artists, released by Amnesty. She performed the song in Michael Moore's Slacker Uprising, in which she incorrectly stated that it was a translation of V.A. Koskenniemi's lyrics of Finlandia.
