= Charles M. Bell =

American lawyer and politician

Charles M. Bell (July 14, 1840 – May 6, 1893) was an American lawyer and politician from New York.

== Life ==
Bell was born on July 13, 1840, in York, New York. He attended the Genesee Wesleyan Seminary in Alexander and the Amenia Seminary in Amenia, after which he taught at a school in Ancram.

In August 1862, during the American Civil War, he enlisted and was mustered in as a sergeant in Company G., 128th New York Infantry Regiment. He was promoted to first sergeant in July 1863. In September 1863, he was discharged to accept a commission as first lieutenant of Corps de Afrique, 91st United States Infantry, a regiment of black soldiers he and others from the 128th Regiment helped organize. He served in the 91st for the rest of the war. He fought in Port Hudson and the Red River Campaign. He was the eldest of four brothers that fought in the Civil War, two of whom were killed in the war. After the war, he returned to Columbia County, where he studied law and was admitted to the bar in 1867.

Bell served as District Attorney of Columbia County from 1872 to 1874. He unsuccessfully ran for Surrogate of Columbia County in 1883. In 1892, he was elected to the New York State Assembly as a Republican, representing Columbia County. He served in the Assembly in 1893. While in the Assembly, he introduced bills that appropriated $75,000 to construct additional buildings for the House of Refuge for Women in Hudson, dealt with bonded indebtedness in Mount Lebanon, regulated the compensation of town supervisors in Columbia County, amended the General Municipal Law, authorized Hudson to borrow money to build school buildings, revised Hudson's city charter, and made the County Clerk of Hudson County a salaried office.

Bell was a Master of his local Freemason lodge and a member of the Grand Army of the Republic.

Bell died at home in Hillsdale from pneumonia on May 6, 1893. He was buried in Hillsdale Rural Cemetery.

New York State Assembly
Preceded by Henry L. Warner	New York State Assembly; Columbia County; 1893	Succeeded by Jacob H. Hoysradt
