= Henry L. Warner =

American politician

Henry Warner

Member of the New York State Assembly from Columbia County
- In office 1892
- Preceded by: Aaron B. Gardenier
- Succeeded by: Charles M. Bell

Personal details
- Born: March 6, 1833 Canaan, New York, U.S.
- Died: July 20, 1897 (aged 64)
- Party: Democratic
- Spouse: Sarah Barnes
- Children: 7

Henry L. Warner (March 6, 1833 – July 20, 1897) was an American farmer and politician from New York who served as a member of the New York State Assembly in 1892.

== Background ==
Warner was born on March 6, 1833, in Canaan, New York. He worked as a farmer in Canaan Four Corners.

In 1891, Warner was elected to the New York State Assembly as a Democrat, representing Columbia County. He served in the Assembly in 1892.

Warner was married to Sarah Barnes, the daughter of Daniel D. Barnes. Their children were E. A. Corey, D. D., Harry, Fred, Hattie Chapin, Anna, and Charles. He was a prominent member of the local Congregational church.

Warner died on July 20, 1897. He was buried in Canaan Centre cemetery.

New York State Assembly
Preceded by Aaron B. Gardenier	New York State Assembly; Columbia County; 1892	Succeeded by Charles M. Bell
