= Catharina von Schlegel =

German hymnist

Catharina Amalia Dorothea von Schlegel (21 October [O.S. 11 October] 1697 – 24 December 1777) was a German hymn writer.

She was born into the nobility in Mittelhausen near Allstedt, in Saxe-Eisenach, the sixth of eleven children of Wolff Otto von Schlegel (1653–1708) and his wife Helene Dorothea von der Oelsnitz (1664–1717). Although her Julian-date birthday was 11 October, which translates to the Gregorian date 21 October in 1697, she later celebrated her birthday on 22 October, likely as the result of the incorrect application of the 18th century Julian-Gregorian calendar offset to a 17th-century date. After the death of her parents, she may have lived in a convent (Frauenzimmerstift) at the Francke Foundations in Halle in 1722 and 1723.

Sometime before 1725, she became a lady-in-waiting in the court of Köthen to Agnes Wilhelmine von Wuthenau, who married Augustus Louis, Prince of Anhalt-Köthen in 1722. After her mistress died in January 1725, however, von Schlegel entered the Damenstift (a residential endowment for unmarried Protestant women) in Köthen on 20 April 1725. There she lived the rest of her days.

In 1726 she corresponded with August Hermann Francke, the Lutheran clergyman, philanthropist, and Biblical scholar. In 1730 and 1731 she also wrote to his son and successor Gotthilf August Francke, and after his death to his widow. In addition to her duties as a canoness, von Schlegel also collected funds for the Tranquebar Mission in India.

She wrote dozens of hymns in the spirit of early Pietism that can be found in the various collections of Cöthen'schen Lieder appearing from 1736 to 1752. The biggest impact was initially caused by Glauben, Glaubensflügel her and Süßes Lamm, gieb meiner Seelen, both published in 1736.

Among English speakers, von Schlegel's best known hymn is Stille mein Wille, dein Jesus hilft siegen, first published in 1752. It was reworked slightly by Albert Knapp in 1837 and then translated into English by Jane Laurie Borthwick as Be still, my soul, the Lord is on thy side. Today it is usually sung to the tune of Finlandia. This hymn has enjoyed ecumenical and nearly worldwide adoption.
