= Henry Bradford Nason =

American chemist

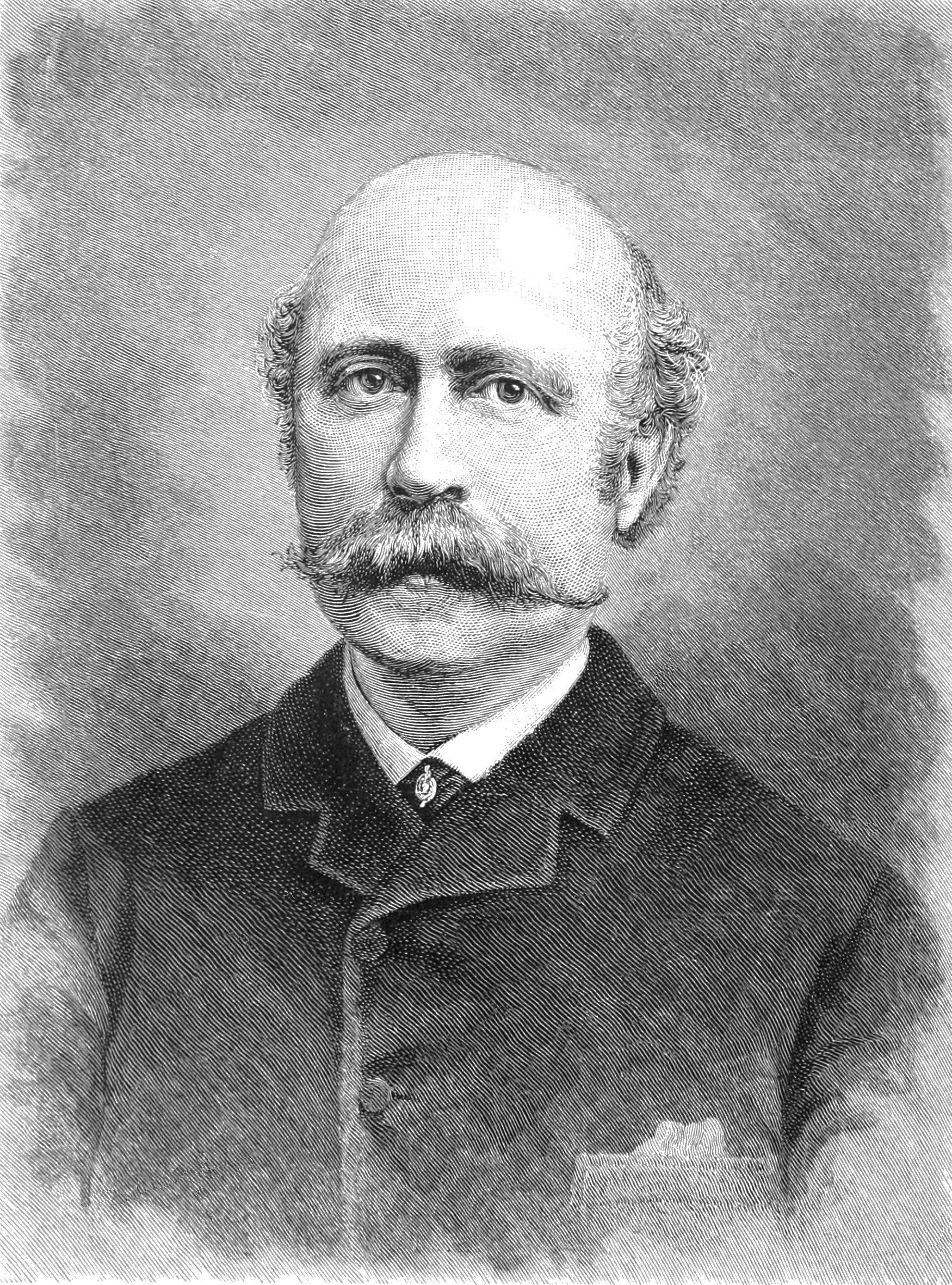

Henry Bradford Nason (born in Foxborough, Massachusetts, 22 June 1831; died in Troy, New York, 18 January 1895) was a United States chemist.

== Biography ==
His father, Elias Nason (born at Walpole, Massachusetts, in 1768; died at Easthampton, Massachusetts, in 1853), was a manufacturer of straw and cotton goods, a merchant, and served his town, Foxborough, as justice of the peace and as representative in the Massachusetts General Court. The family moved to North Bridgewater (now Brockton) when Henry Bradford was 10.

Having attended school for a short time at Newburyport, Massachusetts, Henry Bradford entered the Adelphian Academy at North Bridgewater in 1843, where his attention was drawn to the study of natural science, and he began to make collections of the local minerals. He entered Williston Seminary in December 1847, where his taste for natural science grew; he also became interested in chemistry, and enriched his collections of plants and minerals.

Nason pursued his studies further at Amherst College. There, he visited the interesting geological points in the Connecticut River Valley, and, under the guidance of Professor Shepard, he spent most of his vacations in the mineralogically rich regions of western Massachusetts and Connecticut, making many of his expeditions on foot or on horseback. He studied analytical chemistry under Professor Clark, and assisted him in the preparations for his lectures. He graduated from Amherst in 1855.

Nason then studied chemistry at the University of Göttingen, Germany, where in 1857 he received the degree of Ph.D. for his original investigations on the formation of ethers. At Göttingen he also became a member of the Burschenschaft Hannovera (fraternity). He afterward spent some time with Robert Bunsen at the University of Heidelberg, and with Karl Friedrich Plattner at the Technische Universität Bergakademie Freiberg. He enriched his collections with many specimens of minerals and of art.

On his return to the United States in 1858, Nason was appointed professor of natural history at the Rensselaer Polytechnic Institute (RPI) in Troy, New York, and in the same year he became professor of chemistry and natural sciences in Beloit College, holding both of these appointments until 1866. He then became professor of chemistry and natural science at RPI.

In 1860, he made a second visit to Europe, and made a tour of geological study in the southern United States. In the next year, he traveled through Ireland, Scotland, the Netherlands, Belgium, and a part of Germany, and spent a semester in Göttingen in the study of geology and mineralogy, under Waltershausen. He then visited and studied the volcanic regions of Italy, ascended Mount Vesuvius, explored the regions of the solfatara, climbed Mount Etna, examined the glaciers of Switzerland and the configuration of the Alpine regions; and, in France, inspected the natural curiosities of the Puy-de-Dôme.

In 1872 and 1875 he made three visits to California, in the course of which he traveled in Nevada and Idaho, and the mining regions of Colorado and Utah, and included in his third trip the Yosemite Valley. He spent the summer of 1877 in Finland and Russia. He was appointed juror by U.S. President Rutherford B. Hayes for the Paris Exposition of 1878, and was assigned the department of mineralogy and metallurgy.

From 1880 to 1890, he was an advising chemist for the Standard Oil Company. There he worked on the refining of petroleum, methods of testing, analysis of the composition of crude oils, and the abatement of nuisances arising from smoke, odors, and other products of refineries. That year Nason received the degree of M.D. from Union College, and the degree of LL.D. from Beloit College. In 1881 the New York State Board of Health selected him to be inspector of petroleum oils, and appointed him as commissioner to London to consider methods of dealing with petroleum nuisances.

Another visit to northern Europe, in the summer of 1884, embraced the fjords and glaciers of Norway, and was extended to the North Cape. In 1887, Nason was appointed director of Pratt Institute, Brooklyn, New York.

Nason was a member of the chemical societies of Berlin and New York, and in 1878 he was made a fellow of the London Chemical Society. He was a fellow of the American Association for the Advancement of Science and the Society of Chemical Industry; a member of the American Chemical Society, the New York Academy of Sciences, the American Institute of Mining Engineers, and the Troy Scientific Association; an honorary member of the Albany Institute; and a member of the Norwegian Trekking Association.

From 1872 to 1886, he was secretary of the General Alumni Association of RPI. As such, his books of 1875 and 1887 were prepared. Nason hall, an undergraduate residence hall at RPI, is named in his honor. After his death in 1895, he was buried in Oakwood Cemetery were a plaque on his gravestone reads: "Co-founder of GSA and mentor of eminent GSA president Thomas C. Chamberlin, and inspirer of Roebling in mineralogy."

== Works ==
- Table of Reactions for Qualitative Analysis (Troy, 1865)
- Friedrich Wöhler, Handbook of Mineral Analysis, translation (Philadelphia, 1868)
- Table for Qualitative Analysis in Colors (Troy, 1870)
- Elderhorst, Manual of Blowpipe Analysis, and Determinative Mineralogy, editor with Charles F. Chandler (Philadelphia, 1873; 4th ed., 1875; 5th ed., 1876; 1880)
- Proceedings of the Semi-Centennial Celebration of the Rensselaer Polytechnic Institute, Troy, N.Y., with a Catalogue of Officers and Students, 1824-74 (1875)
- Biographical Record of Officers and Graduates of Rensselaer Polytechnic Institute (1887)

== Family ==
His cousin Elias Nason was a Massachusetts clergyman and author.
