= Elias Nason =

American Congregational clergyman (1811–1887)

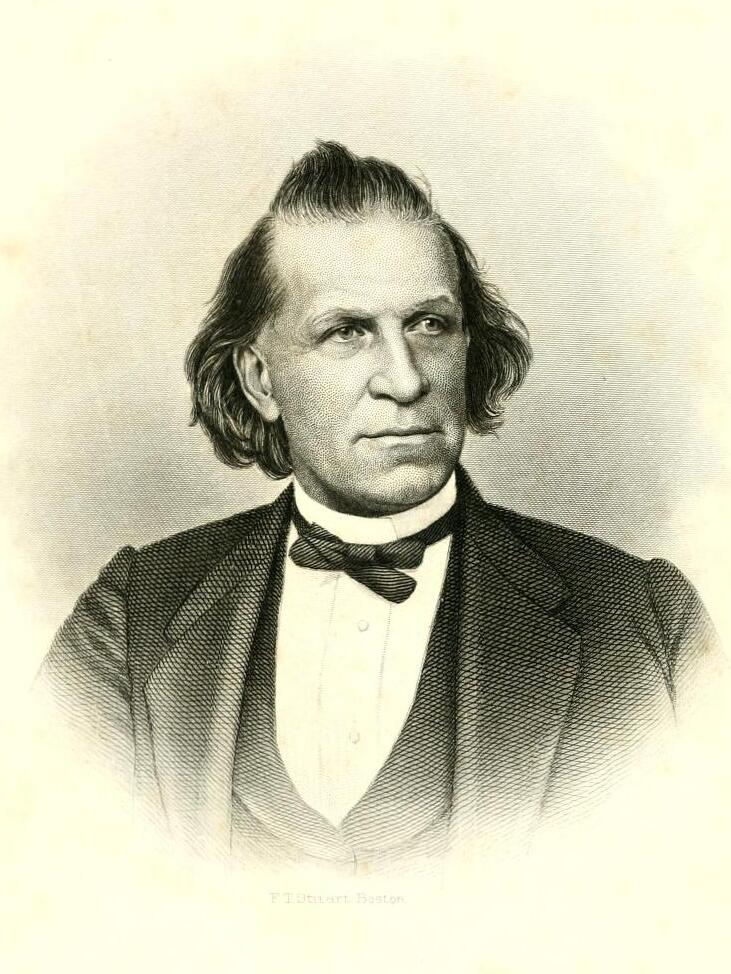
Rev. Elias Nason

Elias Nason (21 April 1811 in Wrentham, Massachusetts – 17 June 1887 in North Billerica, Massachusetts) was a Massachusetts Congregational clergyman, educator, editor and author.

== Biography ==
He started working for a paper mill in Framingham, Massachusetts, in 1826, and attended school on the side. After five years, he left to study for a year with Chauncey Colton and Justin Perkins at Amherst College. Then he entered Brown University and taught on the side to finance his studies. He graduated from Brown in 1835.

He spent five months as principal of Cambridge Latin Grammar School, and in 1836 married Myra Anne Bigelow. They had six children eventually. After leaving Cambridge Latin, he sailed for Charleston, South Carolina, with naturalist John E. Holbrook. From 1836 to 1840, he taught in Augusta, Georgia, edited the Georgia Courier, and lectured throughout the state of Georgia on the flora of the south.

Returning to Massachusetts, he settled in Newburyport, edited the Watchtower, became master of the Latin school, and subsequently of the high school, and in 1852 was ordained pastor of the Congregational Church in Natick. He officiated at a church in Needham in 1858–60. During the American Civil War, he served on the Christian Commission, writing and lecturing in support of the Union. From 1865 until his death, he resided in North Billerica, and officiated in adjoining churches.

He was a successful lecturer, spoke several languages, was a member of many learned societies, and at one time edited the New England Historical and Genealogical Register (1866 and 1867). He was elected a member of the American Antiquarian Society in 1865.

His cousin Henry Bradford Nason was a noted chemist.

== Works ==
- Songs for the School Room (Boston, 1842)
- Chrestomathie Française (1849)
- Memoir of Rev. Nathaniel Howe (1851)
- Thou Shalt Not Steal (1852)
- Strength and Beauty of the Sanctuary (1854)
- Congregational Hymn Book (1857)
- Congregational Hymn and Tune Book (1858)
- Our Obligations to Defend our Country, and Sermons on the War (1861)
- Songs for Social and Public Worship (1862)
- Eulogy on Edward Everett (1865)
- Fountains of Salvation (1865)
- Eulogy on Abraham Lincoln (1865)
- Life of Sir Charles Henry Frankland (1865)
- Memoir of Mrs. Susanna Rowson (1870)
- Gazetteer of Massachusetts (1872)
- Life of Henry Wilson (1872)
- Lives of Moody and Sankey (1872)
- History of Middlesex County (1872)
- The Life and Times of Charles Sumner: His Boyhood, Education and Public Career (Boston: B. B. Russell, 1874)
- History of the Town of Dunstable, Massachusetts, with George Bailey Loring (1877)
- Samuel Adams Drake, compiler, History of Middlesex County, Massachusetts, article on Hopkinton (pp. 483–495) in Volume 1 (A-H), and article on Tyngsborough (pp. 391–399) in Volume 2 (L-W) (1879–1880)

He also left in manuscript a “History of Hopkinton” and a “History of the Nason Family.”
