= Lace House (Canaan, New York) =

Historic house in New York, United States

- U.S. National Register of Historic Places
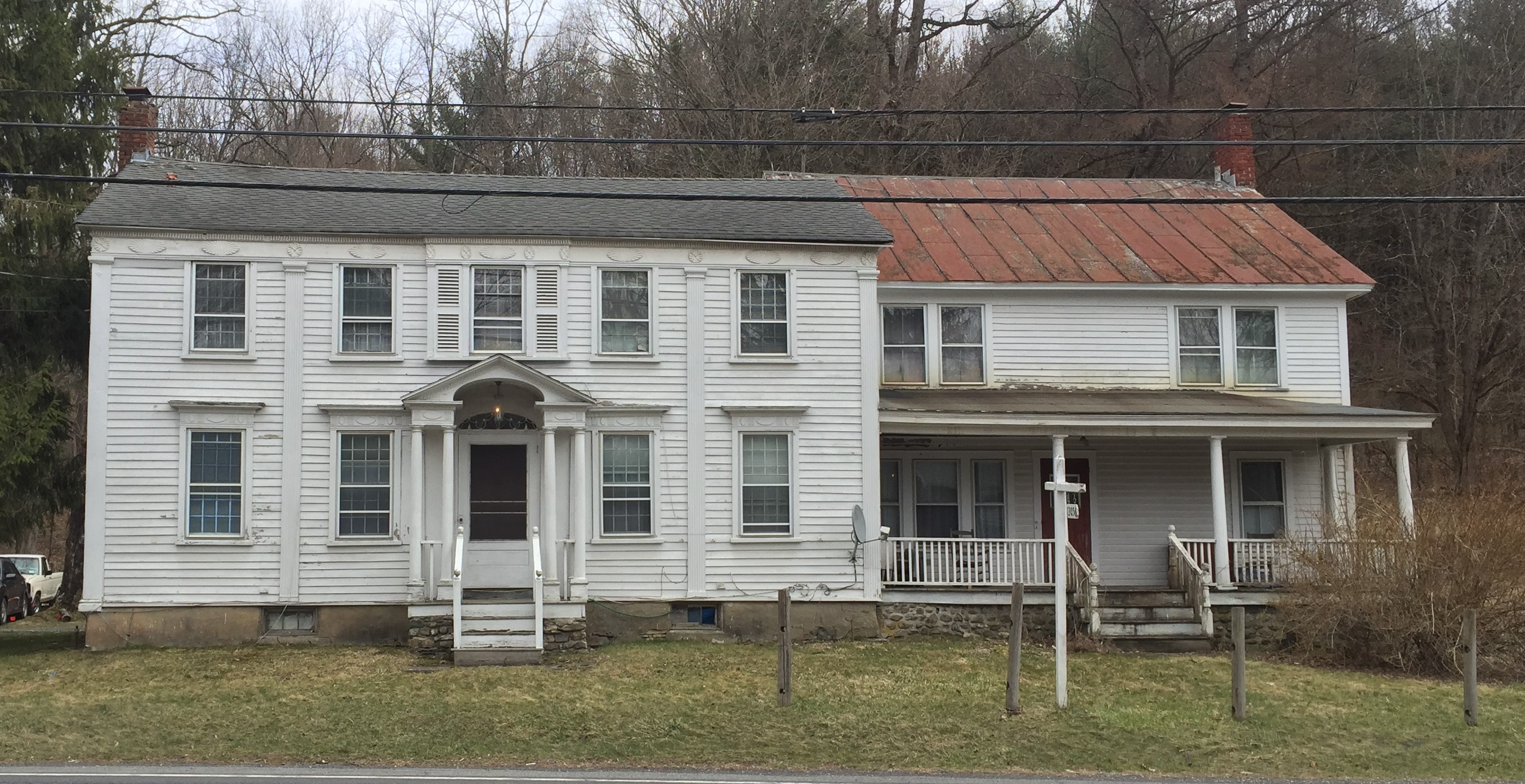
- West elevation and north profile, 2008

- Location within New York Location within the United States
- Location: Canaan, NY
- Nearest city: Pittsfield, MA
- Coordinates: 42°22′36″N 73°25′45″W
- Area: 1.4 acres (5,700 m^{2})
- Built: 1806
- Architect: Fuller Brothers
- Architectural style: Federal
- NRHP reference No.: 85000336
- Added to NRHP: February 21, 1985

The Lace House, also known as the Uriah Edwards House, is located on state highway NY 22 in Canaan, New York, United States. It is a frame house built in the early 19th century.

It was designed by the Fuller Brothers in a more formal version of the Federal style brought from New England by settlers from that region at the time of its construction. The original kitchen wing was replaced in the early 20th century. The house was added to the National Register of Historic Places in 1985.

== Building ==
The house and a non-contributing garage are located on a 1.4-acre (5,700 m^{2}) lot on the east side of Route 22, just across from Miller Road and a mile north of the New York State Thruway's Berkshire extension (Interstate 90). The cleared ground slopes up to the east, towards the Massachusetts state line 1.5 miles (2.4 km) to the east, across the hill. A row of wooden fence posts runs along the roadside. The neighborhood, the small hamlet of Flatbrook, has some scattered commercial and residential buildings.

The building itself is a two-story, five-bay structure sided in pine clapboard on a drywall stone foundation. A wing of similar height projects to the south. Brick chimneys rise from either end; a large television antenna is just south of the northern chimney piercing the shingled roof.

A small set of steps on the west (front) facade rises to a single-bay portico sheltering the centrally located main entrance with a gabled roof supported by paired wooden fluted pillars. The pediment has a denticulated entablature. It is echoed by a less ornate portico over the rear entrance.

Fluted pilasters rise to the frieze between the last bays on either end and the rest of the windows. The frieze, decorated with medallions and dentils, runs around all sides of the main block except the east (rear). All the windows have at least one louvered shutter. Many still have the original shutter hooks. The corners have pilasters as well; on the southwest is a small satellite dish.

The south wing has a full-length porch across the front. Another chimney rises from its south end. Its roof is clad in metal.

Another pair of fluted pilasters flanks the main doorway, which is topped by a large fanlight. It opens onto a center hall running the length of the house. The interior has much original trim, including plaster, carved moldings and mantels. The dining room's ceiling has been redone in tile. Some of the original wide-plank flooring remains.

== History ==
Uriah Edwards, a native of nearby Richmond, Massachusetts, moved across the state line in 1800 at the age of 31 to work as a clerk in Flatbrook. After a short return to Richmond, he returned in 1802 to open his own store. Two years later he wed a local woman, Betsy Olmsted, a descendant of one of the original settlers of Canaan who also owned vast tracts of land to the south and west of the current house.

The house was built two years after their marriage. Unlike other contemporary Federal-style houses in Columbia County, it is extensively ornamented. It follows a unique regional pattern found in vernacular rural early Federal houses in New York communities near Connecticut and Massachusetts, such as the Tabor-Wing House in Dover Plains, of having most of that decoration lavished on the porch. Its overall decoration gave it the nickname "Lace House" shortly after its construction, and it has been locally known by that name ever since.

Edwards would later sell some of his land to the new Albany and West Stockbridge Railroad, later the Hudson and Berkshire and then the Boston and Albany Railroad, the first to connect the two states. He opened a station known variously as Edwards park or Edwards Station until it was demolished in the mid-20th century. He was active in local politics, serving as town supervisor, town justice, and state assemblyman before he died in 1851. His wife survived him by 16 years.

Upon her death, her sister-in-law Lucinda Edwards Woodworth inherited the house. She soon left it to her own daughter, who had married into another prominent local family, the Curtises. One of her descendants, Harriet Curtis, conveyed it to Rufus Woodworth, a neighbor. When she died, her executor brought suit to have the conveyance voided. The house stood vacant for several years, with the kitchen wing on the south deteriorating, until the litigation was settled in 1921.

William Edwards sold the property soon after to a family named Rathbun, who demolished the original kitchen wing and replaced it with the current one. At this point they also moved the chimneys and replaced the original wood shingle roof with metal. They also dug a new well and had the house wired for electricity.

After 60 years, their descendants sold it to another family, the Brusches. They proceeded to renovate the house in 1983. Most of their work upgraded the house, bringing its electricity and water connections to late 20th century standards, and refinishing the interior and exterior. Their major addition was the rear portico. After the work was done and the property listed on the Register, they operated it as a bed and breakfast.

== See also ==
- National Register of Historic Places listings in Columbia County, New York
