= Margaret Mackay (writer) =

Scottish writer (1802–1887)

Margaret Mackay (pen name, Mrs. Colonel Mackay; 1802–1887) was a Scottish author of several books. Her Thoughts Redeemed; or, Lays of Leisure Hours (1854), contained 72 of her hymns and poems. Among her prose works, The Family at Heatherdale (1837) was most widely read. Of all funeral hymns in her era, none was sung more often than Mackay's, "Asleep in Jesus! blessed sleep"; it was first published in The Amethyst: or Christian's Annual (Edinburgh, 1832).

== Biography ==
Margaret Mackay was born at Inverness, Scotland, in 1802. (Note: According to Nutter (1884), Margaret Mackay was born in Scotland in 1801. In Nutter (1911), he recorded her as being born at Inverness, Scotland, in 1802. According to Smith (1903), Margaret Mackay was born at Hedgefield, Scotland, in 1802.) Her father, Captain Robert Mackay of Hedgefield, near Inverness, was a native of Sutherland-an old officer who served in several South American campaigns. Her mother was connected with one of the older leading families of Inverness. When attending the first General Assembly of the Church of Scotland at Inverness, Dr. Alexander Chalmers, being a friend of the family, resided at Hedgefield.

In 1820, she married Lieutenant Colonel William Mackay, an officer in the English army in the Sixty-eighth Light Infantry, who served in the Peninsular War.

Mackay spent her limited income in helping every good cause. She had a wide circle of acquaintances in the north of Scotland and in different parts of England, where she often resided.

She was the author of a number of volumes, which were well received—all of them being of an evangelical, thoughtful, and instructive nature. These included: The Family of Heatherdale, The Wycliffites, Christian Life in the Camp, Sabbath Musings, and others.

In the introduction to her book-Thoughts Redeemed, or Lays of Leisure Hours (Edinburgh: W. P. Kennedy, 1854) she remarked:-

"I have placed at the beginning that entitled "Asleep in Jesus," as one which is already known to several readers. It has afforded me no small degree of satisfaction to learn that these verses have been favoured by resting on the minds of weak and weary individuals, as they were enabled to cast their eyes towards the rest of heaven. This little poem has found its way into selections both in this country and in America, and may therefore introduce into circulation its more retired companions, many of which have never before travelled beyond their humble niche in my own private repository." "Sleeping in Jesus." "This simple inscription is carved on a tombstone in the retired rural burying-ground of Pennycross Chapel, in Devonshire. Distant only a few miles from a bustling and crowded seaport town, reached through a succession of those lovely lanes for which Devonshire is so remarkable, the quiet aspect of Pennycross comes soothingly over the mind Sleeping in Jesus' seems in keeping with all around. Here was no elaborate ornament-no unsightly decay. The trim gravel walk led to the house of prayer, itself boasting of no architectural embellishment to distinguish it; and a few trees were planted irregularly to mark some favoured spots."

In a measure, Mackay shared with her reader the background to this hymn which went around the world, and was sung in churches of all communions. Smith included the hymn in his Songs from the Hearts of Women: One Hundred Famous Hymns and Their Writers (1903).

Margaret Mackay died January 5, 1887. (Note: According to Edwards (1889), Margaret Mackay died at Cheltenham in 1886.) She was interred in the family burying ground at Inverness. On her grave are simply inscribed the first words of her hymn, "Asleep in Jesus!"

== Selected works ==
- The Family at Heatherdale: Or, the Influence of Christian Principles, 1837 (text)
- The Wycliffites, Or, England in the Fifteenth Century, 1846 (text)
- Thoughts Redeemed, or Lays of Leisure Hours, 1854 (text)
- Sabbath Musings throughout the Year, 1854 (text)
- False appearances, 1859 (text)
- Clifford Castle: A Tale of the English Reformation, 1867 (text)
- Christian Life in the Camp

== See also ==
- Mackay of Aberach
