= Nathaniel Howe =

American minister (1764-1837)

Reverend Nathaniel Howe (October 6, 1764 – February 15, 1837) was a Protestant Christian minister at the First Congregational church of Hopkinton, Massachusetts from 1791 until his death.

He is best known for a sermon delivered there in 1815 (the town's 100th anniversary) called the "Century Sermon" that was published and re-printed extensively worldwide. His name is spelt 'Nathanael' in all his works but his biography in Annals of the American Pulpit spells his name 'Nathaniel' and this has become generally accepted.

== Life ==
Nathanael Howe was born in Linebrook parish, in Ipswich, Massachusetts, on October 6, 1764. He was the third son of Captain Abraham and Lucy (Appleton) Howe.

In January, 1791, he began to preach at Hopkinton as a candidate; and in May following, received a unanimous call from the church to settle as its pastor. The citizens of the town desired, however, that he should admit children to baptism whose parents were in the "half-way-covenant"; but finding him opposed to it, they finally united in the call of the church, and he was settled as minister for life, October 5, 1791, with a salary of $70.

He was married, about three months after his settlement, to Olive, daughter of Col. John Jones of Hopkinton. She died December 10, 1843. They had four children - one son and three daughters. The son, Appleton, graduated at Harvard College in 1815, and became a physician, and a member of the Massachusetts Senate.

His death occurred on February 15, 1837, in the 73rd year of his age, and in the 46th year of his ministry.

== Publications ==
His publications are a Sermon on the death of three persons, 1808; a Century Sermon, 1815; [this is one of the most original and remarkable productions of its kind to be found in the language and is that on which the fame of its author chiefly depends;] a Sermon on the design of John's Baptism, preached before the Mendon Association, 1819; an Attempt to prove that John's Baptism was not Gospel Baptism; being a Reply to Dr. Baldwin's Essay on the same subject, 1820; a Catechism with Miscellaneous Questions; and a chapter of Proverbs for the children under his pastoral care. Boston, printed by Perkins, Marvin & Co., 1834,

"The way to be nothing is to do nothing."—Nathaniel Howe
