= Marnie Barrell =

New Zealand hymnwriter

Marnie Barrell MNZM
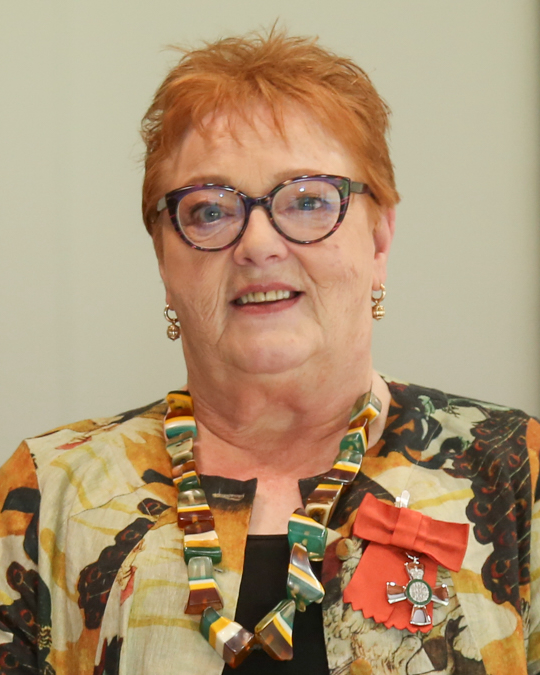
- Barrell in 2024
- Born: 30 December 1952 (age 73); Ashburton, New Zealand
- Education: University of Auckland; University of Canterbury

Margaret Louise Barrell MNZM (born 30 December 1952) is a New Zealand hymn writer and music teacher.

Barrell was born on 30 December 1952 in Ashburton. She was educated at Timaru Girls' High School and Christchurch Girls' High School. She went on to study at the University of Canterbury, from where she graduated with a Bachelor of Arts degree in psychology. At the University of Auckland, she earned a Bachelor of Theology degree.

Barrell started writing hymns in 1986. She writes for Hymnary.org, and is a board member of the New Zealand Hymnbook Trust. In the 1980s or 1990, Barrell was a technician at Lincoln University. She teaches music, and is a lay preacher and musician at St Mary’s Anglican Church in Christchurch. In 2023, she estimated that she had written "50 or 60" hymns.

In the 2024 New Year Honours, Barrell was appointed a Member of the New Zealand Order of Merit, for services as a hymn writer.
