= Georgia Harkness =

American philosopher

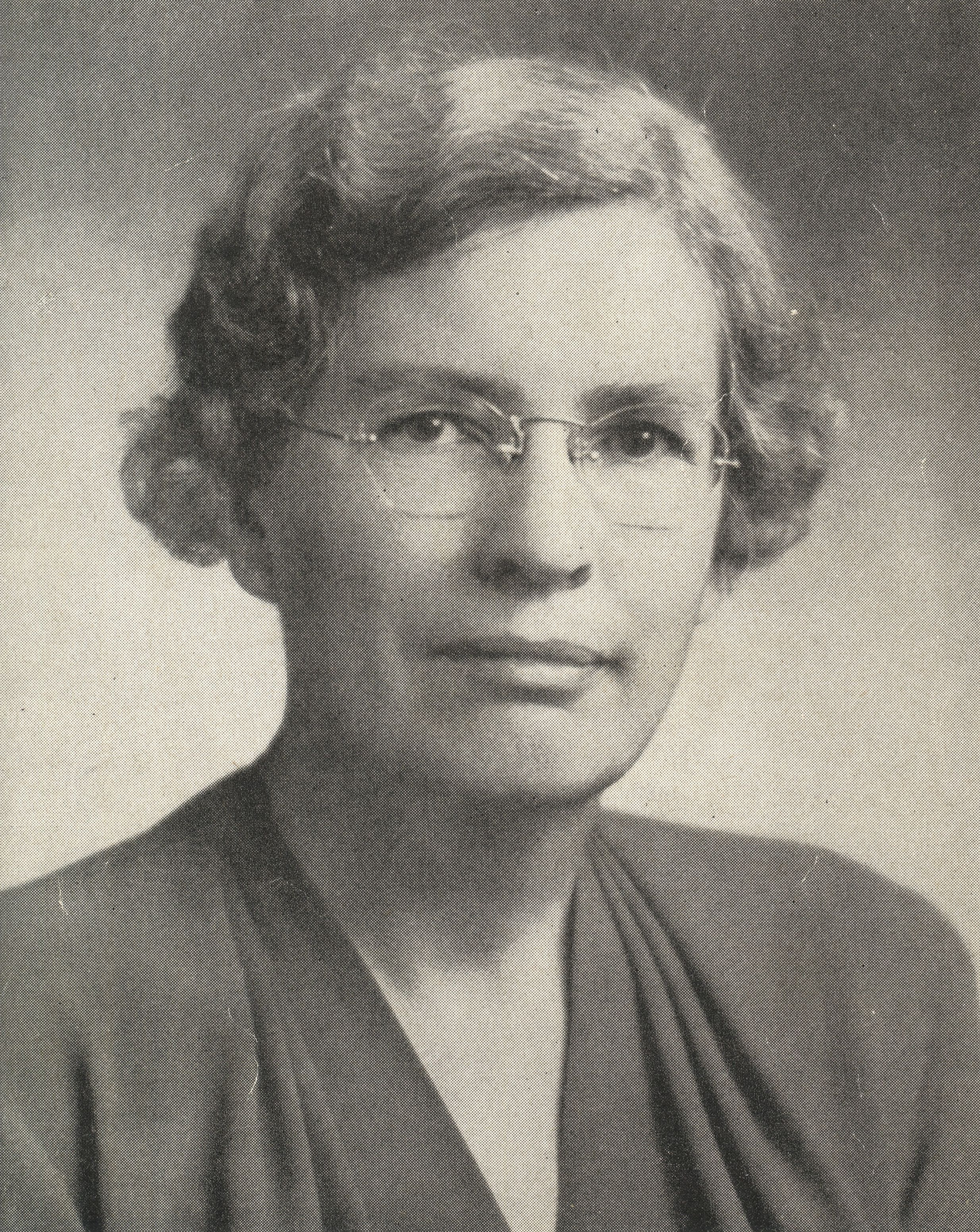
- Harkness, c. 1953
- Born: Georgia Elma Harkness; April 21, 1891; Harkness, New York, U.S.
- Died: August 21, 1974 (aged 83); Claremont, California, U.S.

Academic background
- Education: Cornell University; Boston University
- Thesis: The Philosophy of Thomas Hill Green, with Special Reference to the Relations Between Ethics and the Philosophy of Religion (1923)
- Doctoral advisor: Edgar S. Brightman
- Other advisors: William Ernest Hocking; Alfred North Whitehead
- Influences: James Edwin Creighton; Friedrich Schleiermacher; Paul Tillich; Alfred North Whitehead

Academic work
- Discipline: Theology; philosophy
- School or tradition: Boston personalism (early career); Methodism; theological liberalism
- Institutions: Elmira College; Mount Holyoke College; Garrett Biblical Institute; Pacific School of Religion

Georgia Elma Harkness (1891–1974) was an American Methodist theologian and philosopher. Harkness has been described as one of the first significant American female theologians and was important in the movement to legalize the ordination of women in American Methodism.

Harkness was born on April 21, 1891, in Harkness, New York, a town named after her grandfather, to J. Warren and Lillie (née Merrill) Harkness. In 1912, she completed her undergraduate education at Cornell University, which had begun admitting women in 1872. At Cornell, she came under the influence of James Edwin Creighton. She spent several years as a high school teacher before enrolling at Boston University, from which she would receive a Master of Religious Education degree and a Master of Arts degree in philosophy in 1920. She completed her doctoral studies in philosophy at Boston University in 1923 with the submission of a dissertation titled The Philosophy of Thomas Hill Green, with Special Reference to the Relations Between Ethics and the Philosophy of Religion, which was written under the supervision of the Boston personalist philosopher Edgar S. Brightman.

Harkness served on the faculty of Elmira College from 1923 to 1937 and of Mount Holyoke College from 1937 to 1939. Professor of applied theology at Garrett Biblical Institute (1939–1950) and the Pacific School of Religion (1950–1961), she was the first woman to obtain full professorship in an American theological seminary, and became a leading figure in the modern ecumenical movement. She became the first female member of the American Theological Society.

Harkness had an affinity for ministry through poetry and the arts. Her theological interests centered on the influence of the ecumenical church, eschatology, applied theological thought, and a desire for all persons to understand the Christian faith. She made clear a distaste for the doctrine of original sin, saying that "the sooner it disappears, the better for theology and human sympathy."

Harkness worked with the U.S. government during World War II; her experience lead her to reevaluate her liberal beliefs. During the war, Harkness demonstrated a more cautious view of theology and focused on the limitations of human knowledge and the need for humility.

Harkness was the author of over 30 books and gave her life to teaching. She won many academic awards throughout her life and devoted 20 years of her life to educating the ministry and advocating for women's rights within the church.

Harkness died on August 21, 1974, in Claremont, California.

== Early life ==
Harkness was raised in a conservative family and found it difficult to hide her faith. Growing up in an extremely conservative family, Harkness concealed her belief and did not fully express her opinions on women's equality in the church until later in her life.

== Education and career ==
Harkness received her doctorate degree at Boston University where she studied theology. She was one of the first women ever to earn her doctorate degree at Boston University and was well known for this achievement. After receiving her doctorate, Harkness taught at a high school level for six years and then went on to teach at a collegiate and graduate level for 39 years. During this time, she taught at Japan International Christian University for a year.

During her career, Harkness received many academic awards but was most known for her work with the church. She devoted 20 years of her life to educating the ministry and advocated for women’s rights within the church. The main thing Harkness taught in her theology classes included how theology was not solely a man’s domain and she aimed to teach how women are equal to men and need to be seen as equal within the church and theology field. Furthermore, She taught churchwomen to challenge traditional Christian beliefs and gave women a voice in the church.

== Achievements ==
Harkness left a legacy as a pioneering theologian and leading advocate for women in the church as she allowed them to have a voice and challenge traditional Christian beliefs which cause women to be treated as inferior to men. In 1956, women were awarded equal rights within the United Methodist church in the United States and most of this was thanks to Harkness and her work on social justice.

== Published works ==
- The Church and the Immigrant. 1921.
- Religious Living. New York: Association Press. 1937. OCLC 1055005374.
- The Dark Night of the Soul. New York: Abingdon-Cokesbury Press. 1945.
- Understanding Christian Faith. New York: Abingdon-Cokesbury Press. 1947.
- The Modern Rival of Christian Faith: An Analysis of Secularism. New York: Abingdon-Cokesbury Press. 1952.
- Sources of Western Morality: From Primitive Society Through the Beginning of Christianity. New York: Charles Scribner's Sons. 1954.
- Toward Understanding the Bible. New York: Charles Scribner's Sons. 1954 [1952]. Archived from the original on 2005-01-30.
- Christian Ethics. Abingdon Press. 1957. Archived from the original on 2005-02-18.
- The Gospel and Our World. New York: Abingdon Press. 1959. Archived from the original on 2005-02-17.
- The Providence of God. 1960.
- Beliefs That Count. Nashville, Tennessee: Graded Press. 1961. Archived from the original on 2005-02-17.
- Prayer and the Common Life. New York: Abingdon-Cokesbury Press. 1968 [1948]. Archived from the original on 2005-02-17.
- Grace Abounding. Nashville, Tennessee: Abingdon Press. 1969. ISBN 978-0-687-15659-7.
- The Ministry of Reconciliation. Nashville, Tennessee: Abingdon Press. 1971. ISBN 978-0-687-27048-4.
- Women in Church and Society: A Historical and Theological Inquiry. Nashville, Tennessee: Abingdon Press. 1972. ISBN 978-0-687-45965-0.
- Understanding the Kingdom of God. Nashville, Tennessee: Abingdon Press. 1974. ISBN 978-0-687-42864-9. Archived from the original on 2005-02-17.

== See also ==
- "This is my song" (1934 song)
- United Methodist Church
