= Finlandia =

Tone poem by Jean Sibelius

- Tone poem by Jean Sibelius
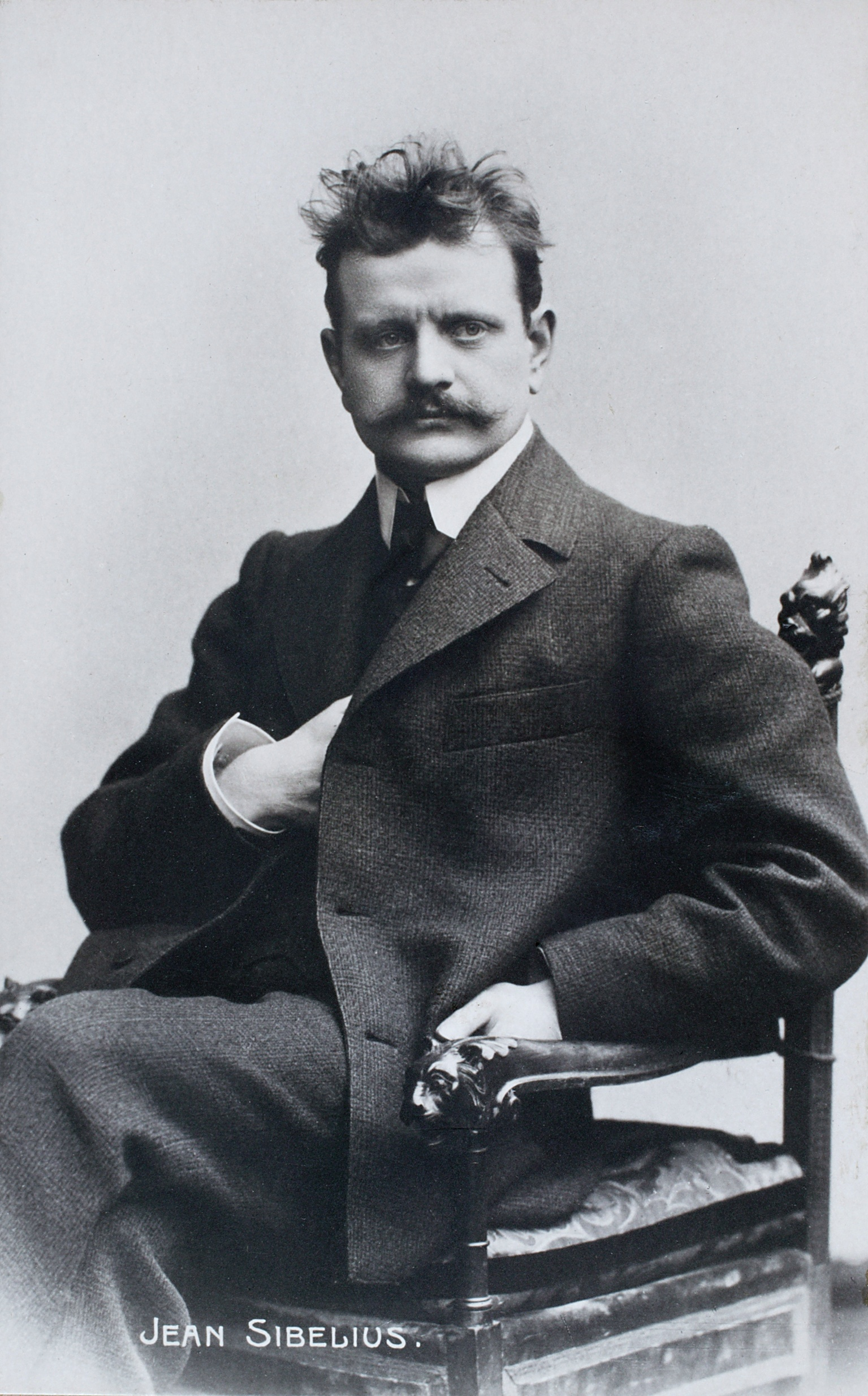
- The composer (c. 1900)
- Catalogue: JS 137/7 (original version)
- Opus: 26 (revised version)
- Composed: 1899, rev. 1900
- Publisher: Fazer & Westerlund (1901) (Note: On 20 July 1905, the Helsinki-based music publisher Fazer & Westerlund (Helsingfors Nya Musikhandel) sold its Sibelius holdings (the publishing rights and printing plates) to the German firm of Breitkopf & Härtel.)
- Duration: 9 mins. (orig. 9 mins.)

Premiere
- Date: 4 November 1899 (JS 137/7); 2 July 1900 (Op. 26)
- Location: Helsinki, Grand Duchy of Finland
- Conductor: Jean Sibelius (JS 137/7); Robert Kajanus (Op. 26)
- Performers: Helsinki Philharmonic Society

Finlandia, Op. 26, is a tone poem by the Finnish composer Jean Sibelius. It was written in 1899 and revised in 1900. The piece was composed for the Press Celebrations of 1899, a covert protest against increasing censorship from the Russian Empire, and was the last of seven pieces performed as an accompaniment to a tableau depicting episodes from Finnish history. The premiere was on 2 July 1900 in Helsinki with the Helsinki Philharmonic Society conducted by Robert Kajanus. A typical performance takes between 7 1/2 and 9 minutes.

== History ==
The British premiere of Finlandia was on 13 October 1906 at the Promenade Concerts at Queen's Hall, conducted by Henry Wood.

As with the Karelia Suite, the original Press Celebrations Music suite was never originally released under Sibelius' supervision, but after almost 99 years with the sheet music untouched, the suite was reconstructed and released on two different CDs, the first one by the Tampere Philharmonic Orchestra in 1998, conducted by Tuomas Ollila, and the second by the Lahti Symphony Orchestra in 2000, conducted by Osmo Vänskä.

The last two movements of the suite were reworked to become Finlandia.

In order to avoid Russian censorship, Finlandia had to be performed under alternative names at various musical concerts. Titles under which the piece masqueraded were numerous and often confusing—famous examples include Happy Feelings at the awakening of Finnish Spring, and A Scandinavian Choral March. According to Finland's tourism website, "While Finland was still a Grand Duchy under Russia, performances within the empire had to take place under the covert title of 'Impromptu'."

The original movements are as follows.

- Preludium: Andante (ma non troppo)
- Tableau 1: The Song of Väinämöinen
- Tableau 2: The Finns are Baptized by Bishop Henry
- Tableau 3: Scene from Duke Johan's Court
- Tableau 4: The Finns in the Thirty Years' War
- Tableau 5: The Great Hostility
- Tableau 6: Finland Awakes

== Instrumentation ==
Finlandia is scored for the following instruments, organized by family (woodwinds, brass, percussion, and strings):

- 2 flutes, 2 oboes, 2 clarinets (in B♭), and 2 bassoons
- 4 horns (in F), 3 trumpets (in F), 3 trombones, and tuba
- Timpani, bass drum, cymbals, and triangle
- Violins (I and II), violas, cellos, and double basses

== Structure ==
Most of the piece is taken up with rousing and turbulent music, evoking the national struggle of the Finnish people.

Main theme (Measures 1–8)

Towards the end, a calm comes over the orchestra, and the serene and melodic Finlandia Hymn is heard. Often incorrectly cited as a traditional folk melody, the Hymn section is Sibelius' own creation.

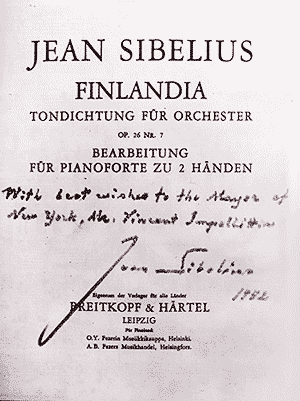
Finlandia, piano arrangement by the composer (1900). 1952 autographed copy for the Mayor of New York, Vincent Impellitteri.

== Derivative works ==
Although he initially composed it for orchestra, in 1900 Sibelius arranged the work for solo piano.

Sibelius later reworked the Finlandia Hymn into a stand-alone piece. This hymn, with words written in 1941 by Veikko Antero Koskenniemi, is one of the most important national songs of Finland. It has been repeatedly suggested to be the official national anthem of Finland. Today, during modern performances of the full-length Finlandia, a choir is sometimes involved, singing the Finnish lyrics with the hymn section.

With different words, it is also sung as a Christian hymn (I Sought The Lord, And Afterward I Knew; Be Still, My Soul, When Memory Fades, I Then Shall Live, Hail, Festal Day, in Italian evangelical churches: Veglia al mattino), and was the national anthem of the short-lived African state of Biafra (Land of the Rising Sun). In Wales the tune is used for Lewis Valentine's patriotic hymn Gweddi Dros Gymru (A Prayer for Wales).
