= I love to steal awhile away =

1818 Christian hymn by Phoebe Hinsdale Brown

- Christian hymn
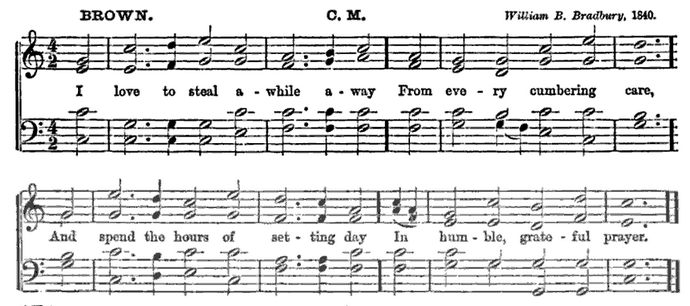
- sheet music
- Written: 1818
- Text: Phoebe Hinsdale Brown
- Meter: 8.6.8.6
- Published: 1824, in Rev. Asahel Nettleton's Village Hymns, with the signature, "B"

"I love to steal awhile away" (originally, "An Apology for my Twilight Rambles, Addressed to a Lady") is a Christian hymn written by Phoebe Hinsdale Brown in 1818 in New Haven, Connecticut, U.S. It was Brown's habit to retire some distance from her house every day at a certain hour for meditation and prayer. The well-beaten path to the woods was discovered, and she was ridiculed by a thoughtless neighbor. "I love to steal awhile away" was written that night in tears, and later sung wherever the English language is spoken. The original version of the poem referenced Brown's domestic cares, but these were removed by the Rev. Asahel Nettleton in the published hymn.

== Origin ==
"An Apology for my Twilight Rambles,
Addressed to a Lady"
(poem)

Yes, when the toilsome day is gone,
And night, with banners gray,
Steals silently the glade along
In twilight's soft array,

I love to steal awhile away
From little ones and care,
And spend the hours of setting day
In gratitude and prayer.

I love to feast on Nature's scenes
When falls the evening dew,
And dwell upon her silent themes.
Forever rich and new.

I love in solitude to shed
The penitential tear,
And all God's promises to plead
Where none can see or hear.

I love to think on mercies past.
And future ones implore,
And all my cares and sorrows cast
On Him whom I adore.

I love to meditate on death!
When shall his message come
With friendly smiles to steal my breath
And take an exile home?

Brown's own account of the origin of the hymn, which had nine stanzas when first written, is as follows:—

I had, while living in East Windsor, Connecticut, kept a kind of diary, and continued it in Ellington, Connecticut. I wrote several scraps of poetry in Ellington, which were published by my brother, Nathan Whiting, in the Religious Intelligencer, at New Haven, Connecticut. It was in Ellington that I wrote the 'Twilight Hymn.' My baby daughter was in my arms when I wrote it. I had been out on a visit at Dr. Hyde's, and several were present. After tea one of my neighbors, who I had ever felt was my superior in every way, came and sat down near me, chatting with another lady, without noticing me. Just as I was rising to go home, she turned suddenly upon me, and said: ' Mrs. Brown, why do you come up at evening so near our house, and then go back without coming in? If you want anything, why don't you come in and ask for it? I could not think who it was, and sent my girl down the garden to see; and she said it was you. That you came to the fence, but, seeing her, turned quickly away, muttering something to yourself.' There was something in her manner, more than her words, that grieved me. I went home, and that evening was left alone. After my children were all in bed, except my baby, I sat down in the kitchen, with my child in my arms, when the grief of my heart burst forth in a flood of tears. I took pen and paper, and gave vent to my oppressed heart in what I called "My Apology for my Twilight Rambles, addressed to a Lady". It will be found in its original form in an old manuscript among my papers. In preparing it (some years after) for Netileton's ' Village Hymns,' some three or four verses were suppressed and a few expressions altered. In the original the first stanza was: 'I love to steal awhile away From little ones and care.' This was strictly true. I had four little children; a small, unfinished house; a sick sister in the only finished room; and there was not a place, above or below, where I could retire for devotion, without a liability to be interrupted. There was no retired room, rock, or grove where I could go, as in former days; but there was no dwelling between our house and the one where that lady lived. Her garden extended down a good way below her house, which stood on a beautiful eminence. The garden was highly cultivated, with fruits and flowers. I loved to smell the fragrance of both (though I could not see them), when I could do so without neglecting duty; and I used to steal away from all within doors, and, going out of our gate, stroll along under the elms that were planted for shade on each side of the road. And, as there was seldom any one passing that way after dark, I felt quite retired and alone with God. I often walked quite up that beautiful garden, and snuffed the fragrance of the peach, the grape, and the ripening apple, if not the flowers. I never saw any one in the garden, and felt that I could have the privilege of that walk and those few moments of uninterrupted communion with God without encroaching upon any one; but, after once knowing that my steps were watched and made the subject of remark and censure, I never could enjoy it as I had done. I have often thought Satan had tried his best to prevent me from prayer, by depriving me of a place to pray.

== Publication ==
"I love to steal awhile away"
(hymn)

I love to steal awhile away
From every cumbering care,
And spend the hours of setting day
In humble, grateful prayer.

I love in solitude to shed
The penitential tear,
And all His promises to plead
Where none but God can hear.

I love to think on mercies past,
And future good implore,
And all my cares and sorrows cast
On Him whom I adore.

I love by faith to take a view
Of brighter scenes in heaven;
The prospect doth my strength renew,
While here by tempests driven.

Thus, when life's toilsome day is o'er,
May its departing ray
Be calm as this impressive hour,
And lead to endless day.

The family removed, in 1818, to Monson, Massachusetts, just over the State line, where her brother-in-law, Alfred Ely, D.D., was settled in the ministry. When Dr. Nettleton was compiling his volume of "Village Hymns," he applied, at the suggestion of Dr. Ely, to Brown, then residing at Monson, for some of her productions. The Rev. Dr. Charles Hyde of Ellington, who was a neighbor of Brown, procured a copy of the original hymn. He was assisting Nettleton to compile the Village Hymns.

... Hyde and his daughter Emeline gave the hymn some touches of rhythmic amendment.

I love to steal awhile away
From little ones and care,

—became,—

I love to steal awhile away
From every cumb'ring care.

In the last line of this stanza —

In gratitude and prayer

—was changed to—

In humble, grateful prayer,

—and the few other defects in syllabic smoothness or literary grace were affectionally repaired, but the slight furbishing it received did not alter the individuality of Mrs. Brown's work. ... Only five stanzas were printed, the others being voted redundant by both author and editor.

Brown provided this revised hymn and three others to Nettleton, and they were inserted in his collection. The tune, "Monson," was composed for it by her son, the Rev. Samuel Robbins Brown, D.D., as was also the tune, "Brown," named for her by W. B. Bradbury. The hymn beginning with "O Lord! thy work revive", "was written from the impulse of a full heart, and shown to a friend, who begged a copy for private use. It soon found its way to the public in the 'Spiritual Songs'. Written at Monson, 1819." Such was Brown's own account of it.

In 1853, it was included in the Leeds H. Bk., and thus became known to English collections. It was also found in Lyra Sac. Amer., p. 39.

== Tune ==
Brown's son Samuel, who, besides being a good minister, inherited his grandfather's musical gift, composed the tune of "Monson," (named in his mother's honor, after her late home), and it may have been the first music set to her hymn. It was the fate of his offering, however, to lose its filial place, and be succeeded by different melodies, though his own still survives in a few collections, sometimes with Collyer's "O Jesus in this solemn hour." It is good music for a hymn of praise rather than for meditative verse. For many years, the hymn was sung to "Woodstock," a tune by Deodatus Dutton. Dutton's "Woodstock" and Bradbury's "Brown," which often replaces it, are worthy rivals of each other, and both continue in favor as fit choral interpretations of the much-loved hymn.
