= Austen George Fox =

American lawyer and philanthropist

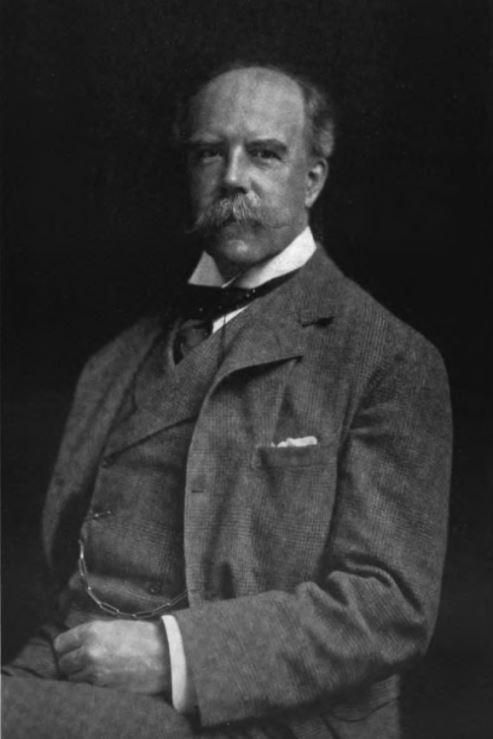

39th President of the Saint Nicholas Society of the City of New York
- In office 1906–1907
- Preceded by: George Gosman DeWitt
- Succeeded by: William Jay

Personal details
- Born: September 7, 1849 Manhattan, New York, U.S.
- Died: May 15, 1937 (aged 87) Wickford, Rhode Island, U.S.
- Spouse: Alice Hoppin (m. 1877; died 1933)
- Relations: Austen Fox Riggs (nephew)
- Children: 3
- Education: Harvard University; Harvard Law School

Austen George Fox (September 7, 1849 – May 15, 1937) was an American lawyer and philanthropist.

== Early life ==
Fox was born on September 7, 1849. He was the son of George Henry Fox (1824–1865) and Hannah Clarissa (née Austen) Fox (1830–1860). His younger sister, Rebecca Fox, was the wife of Dr. Benjamin Clapp Riggs, parents of Dr. Austen Fox Riggs.

A descendant of an old Quaker family, his paternal grandparents were George Shotwell Fox and Rebecca (née Leggett) Fox, herself the daughter of Thomas Leggett and Mary (née Haight) Leggett. His paternal aunt, Anna Mott Fox, was the wife of Augustus Schell, the Collector of the Port of New York.

He was educated at Rev. John O'Choule's School in Newport, Rhode Island followed by Churchill's Military Academy in Sing Sing, New York. Fox graduated from Harvard University with an A.B. degree in 1869 and from Harvard Law School with an LL.B. degree in 1871. While at Harvard, he was a member of the Zeta Psi Fraternity. Eventually becoming the Fraternity's Phi Alpha for the 1890/1891 term.

== Career ==
After graduating from Harvard, he was admitted to the bar in New York in 1872 and began practicing, with an office at 45 Wall Street in Lower Manhattan. He later served as vice-president of the New York City Bar Association. Fox was considered a leader of the New York bar for sixty years, and was a close friend and contemporary of Elihu Root (a U.S. Senator, Secretary of War and Secretary of State) and Joseph Choate (the lawyer and U.S. Ambassador to the United Kingdom under Presidents William McKinley and Theodore Roosevelt).

In October 1894, upon the retirement of Chief Justice Robert Earl, he was offered the Democratic nomination for Judge of the New York Court of Appeals, but declined. From 1895 to 1896, he was asked by John R. Fellows to be the special assistant District Attorney in the prosecution of police officials following the Lexow Committee investigation. In 1897, he was the Citizens Union nominee for New York County District Attorney, in the so-called "Low campaign", however, Democrat Asa Bird Gardiner was elected but later removed from office by then Governor Theodore Roosevelt. In January 1899, Governor Roosevelt appointed Fox special counsel to assist Attorney General John C. Davies in the investigation of charges against George W. Aldridge, the former Commissioner of Public Works and Campbell W. Adams, the former State Engineer, in connection with the deepening of the Erie Canal under what became known as the "Nine Million Dollar Act."

In 1901, he was a founding member of the Committee of Fifteen, which was a New York City citizens' group that lobbied for the elimination of prostitution and gambling, The committee, which was largely unsuccessful, disbanded in 1901 (and was succeeded by the Committee of Fourteen) after evaluating the investigations and reporting to Governor Benjamin Barker Odell, Jr. Fox himself participated in the raids:

"Late one February evening in 1901, Austen G. Fox, prominent Wall Street lawyer and founding member of the Committee of Fifteen, arrived at the West Thirtieth Street police station in the heart of the infamous Tenderloin district with eight of his Committee colleagues. Dressed in his finest evening clothes and a silk top hat, Fox presented the desk sergeant with arrest warrants for the proprietors of eight different gambling parlors and brothels. The nine committeemen, bedecked in formal wear, each set out with a police officer to oversee the arrest of the offending parties. The arrival of Fox and his colleagues in the Tenderloin, traipsing around in the opera clothes accompanied by policeman, drew the attention of the neighborhood's denizens, who followed these strange pairs on their rounds."

He later served as chairman of the Committee of Nine on police problems in 1905. He also served as chairman of the Anti-Imperialistic League. In 1913, he was the defense counsel during the impeachment trial of Democratic Governor William Sulzer, who was eventually found guilty and replaced by his Lieutenant Governor, Martin H. Glynn.

=== Opposition to Brandeis appointment ===
In February 1916, Fox was counsel for fifty-five petitioners who opposed Woodrow Wilson's nominee, Louis Brandeis's appointment to the Supreme Court of the United States and on their behalf, testified before the subcommittee leading questioning to discredit Brandeis. Previously, Fox had "turned down tentative advances to be a member of" Wilson's Cabinet. Along with former president and Supreme Court Justice William Howard Taft, he "secured a statement from six former presidents--as well as the reigning president--of the American Bar Association, all condemning the nomination." Nevertheless, Brandeis was confirmed and served on the Court from June 1916 until his retirement on February 13, 1939.

=== Opposition to Prohibition ===
In 1923, he formed the Moderation League of New York to change the legal definition of the "intoxicating liquors" prohibited by the Eighteenth Amendment to the United States Constitution establishing prohibition. During Herbert Hoover's presidency, he charged that "Hoover had violated his oath of office by calling for the passage of State Prohibition Acts. On the tenth anniversary of the passage of Volstead Act he warned of a 'spirit of revolt abroad' and counseled President Hoover to 'beware lest it be carried into revolution.'"

Fox retired from active practice in 1929 and moved to his wife's estate in Wickford, Rhode Island.

== Personal life ==
On February 8, 1877, Fox was married to Alice Hoppin (1857–1933). Alice was the daughter of Anna Almy (née Jenkins) and Thomas Frederick Hoppin and was the sister of Anna Jenkins Hoppin (who married Dr. Frederick Windle Chapin and was the mother of Anna Alice Chapin) and a relative of architect Howard Hoppin. Together, they lived at 37 East 39th Street (later purchased by the Princeton Club of New York) and 15 East 82nd Street (only briefly), and were the parents of:

- Austen Hoppin Fox (1877–1946), who also attended Harvard Law School.
- Henry Fox (1883–1884), who died in infancy.
- Alice Fox (1885–1971), who married Dr. John C. A. Gerster (1881–1974), a pioneer cancer surgeon, in June 1917.

On December 2, 1872, he was elected a member of the Saint Nicholas Society of the City of New York, an organization in New York City of men descended from early inhabitants of the State of New York. In 1906, he served two terms as the Society's 39th President, succeeding George Gosman DeWitt. He also served as a member of the board of the Carnegie Endowment for International Peace. Fox was a member of the Harvard Club of New York (of which he served as president in 1904 to 1905 and again 1908 to 1909), the Harvard Union, the City Club of New York, the Century Association, the University Club, the Players' Club, and the St Andrews Golf Club.

In 1919, his wife inherited property in Wickford, Rhode Island, on the west side of Narragansett Bay, where she developed Cocumcussoc Farm where it became one of the few Rhode Island farms certified to sell milk in Providence.

In July 1933, his wife died at their apartment in the Hotel Surrey at 20 East 76th Street in Manhattan. Fox died at his home in Wickford, Rhode Island on May 15, 1937. After a funeral at Grace Church in Providence, he was buried at Swan Point Cemetery in Providence, Rhode Island.
