= John William Kilbreth =

American general

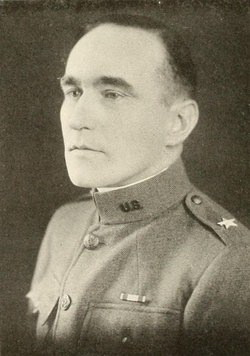
- From 1920's History of the Fifty-fifth Field Artillery Brigade
- Born: February 18, 1876; Manhattan, New York, U.S.
- Died: July 24, 1958 (aged 82); Southampton, New York
- Burial place: Spring Grove Cemetery, Cincinnati, Ohio
- Alma mater: Harvard College (A.B., 1898)
- Spouse: Gertrude Oldfield Barclay Ulman (m. 1922–1958, his death)
- Relatives: James Truesdell Kilbreth (uncle)
- Military career
- Allegiance: United States
- Branch of Service: United States Army
- Service years: 1898–1922
- Rank: Brigadier General
- Service number: 0-1260
- Units: U.S. Army Coast Artillery Corps; U.S. Army Field Artillery Branch
- Commands: 23rd Coast Artillery Company; Battery F, 6th Field Artillery Regiment; Mounted Service School Training School for Bakers and Cooks; Department of Firing, United States Army Field Artillery School; 55th Field Artillery Brigade; Camp Shelby, Mississippi
- Wars: Spanish–American War; Philippine–American War; World War I Occupation of the Rhineland
- Awards: Army Distinguished Service Medal

John William Kilbreth (February 18, 1876 – July 24, 1958) was an American brigadier general who served during World War I. He received the Army Distinguished Service Medal for his accomplishments as Director of the Department of Firing at Fort Sill, Oklahoma's United States Army Field Artillery School.

== Early life ==
John William Kilbreth, often referred to as J. William Kilbreth, was born in Manhattan, New York on February 18, 1876, the son of John William Kilbreth Sr. and Mary (Culbertson) Kilbreth. His family included his father's brother, James Truesdell Kilbreth, an attorney who served as Collector of the Port of New York. He attended the Westminster School in Dobbs Ferry, New York, then began attendance at Harvard College. He graduated from Harvard with a A.B. degree in 1898. While in college, Kilbreth was a member of the Hasty Pudding Club.

== Start of career ==
On September 9, 1898, Kilbreth was commissioned as a second lieutenant of Field Artillery. Assigned to the 4th Artillery Regiment, Kilbreth performed Spanish–American War coast artillery duty with Battery M at Fort Delaware, Delaware and the Harbor Defenses of Portsmouth, New Hampshire. He served in the Philippines from March 1899 to August 1901, during the Philippine–American War, and was promoted to first lieutenant in May 1901.

Kilbreth attended the U.S. Army Artillery School at Fort Monroe, Virginia from August 1901 to August 1902. After graduation, he was assigned to the 7th Field Artillery Battery at Fort Riley, Kansas. In August 1903, he was assigned to the 51st Coast Artillery Company with duty at Fort Hamilton, New York. He was promoted to captain in April 1904, and assigned to command the 23rd Coast Artillery Company at Fort McKinley, Maine.

In 1907, Kilbreth was assigned to command Battery F, 6th Field Artillery Regiment, which was stationed at Fort Riley. In 1911, he was assigned to temporary duty as inspector general of National Guard units in the 2nd Inspection District, which included New York City.

In March 1912, Kilbreth was court-martialed, accused of failure to pay three minor debts totaling $22.65 (about $670 in 2022). In addition, he was charged with neglect of duty for allegedly failing to visit units at remote locations beyond the New York City area. Kilbreth was prosecuted by John F. Madden and found guilty of disobeying orders for failing to respond to the Adjutant General of the United States Army's inquiries about the debts, and reduced several places on the captain's seniority list, but was not otherwise punished.

== Continued career ==
In 1912, Kilbreth was assigned to the Mounted Service School at Fort Riley, where he was the commander of the Training School for Bakers and Cooks.

When the United States entered World War I in April 1917, Kilbreth was stationed at Schofield Barracks, Hawaii with the 9th Artillery. He was promoted to major in May, and temporary lieutenant colonel the following August. From August 1917 to May 1918, Kilbreth was director of the Department of Firing at the United States Army Field Artillery School, and he was promoted to temporary colonel in February 1918.

In May 1918, Kilbreth was assigned to duty in France as chief of operations for First United States Army Artillery, and he was subsequently assigned as First Army Artillery's chief of staff. In October, he was promoted to temporary brigadier general and assigned to command the 55th Field Artillery Brigade, a unit of the 30th Division. He remained in command through the end of the war in November 1918, and in December was assigned to staff duty at the American Expeditionary Forces headquarters. In March 1919, he ended his post-war occupation duty and returned to the United States. Kilbreth received the Army Distinguished Service Medal to recognize his wartime service. The citation for the medal reads:

The President of the United States of America, authorized by Act of Congress, July 9, 1918, takes pleasure in presenting the Army Distinguished Service Medal to Lieutenant Colonel (Field Artillery John W. Kilbreth, United States Army, for exceptionally meritorious and distinguished services to the Government of the United States, in a duty of great responsibility during World War I. As Director of the Department of Firing, School of Fire for Field Artillery, Fort Sill, Oklahoma, from September 1917 to May 1918, Lieutenant Colonel Kilbreth displayed professional attainments of the highest and most progressive order. He was primarily responsible for the excellent grounding received by thousands of officers in the principles of artillery firing, including those applicable to open warfare.

Kilbreth demobilized at Camp Shelby, Mississippi, and was assigned to command the post. In May 1919, he was assigned as deputy commandant of the Field Artillery School at Fort Sill and returned to his permanent rank of major. In July 1919, he received promotion to permanent lieutenant colonel. From 1920 to 1921, Kilbreth was a student at the General Staff College (now the United States Army Command and General Staff College), and in 1921 he was assigned to staff duty in the office of the Chief of Field Artillery. Kilbreth retired from the Army in 1922.

== Retirement and death ==
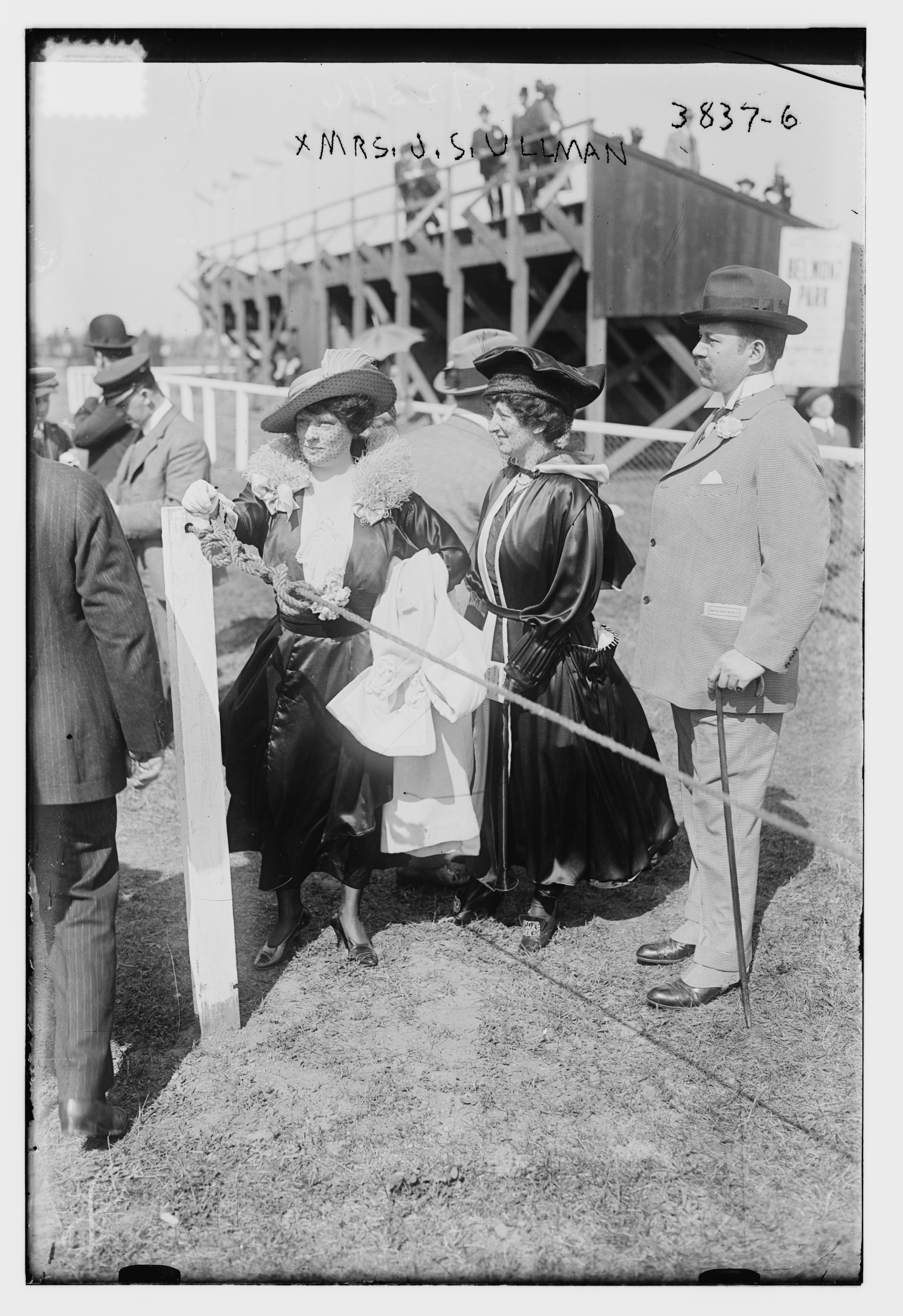
Gertrude O. Barclay in 1916

On December 15, 1922, Kilbreth married Gertrude O. Barclay (d. 1961), the widow of Julien Stevens Ullman. They had no children, but with her first husband, Mrs. Kilbreth was the mother of three sons and a daughter. In 1930, the United States Congress enacted a law permitting World War I general officers to retire at their highest rank, and Kilbreth was promoted to brigadier general on the retired list.

Kilbreth died in Southampton, New York on July 24, 1958. He was buried at Spring Grove Cemetery in Cincinnati, Ohio.
