= George R. Bidwell =

American bicycle salesman and manufacturer

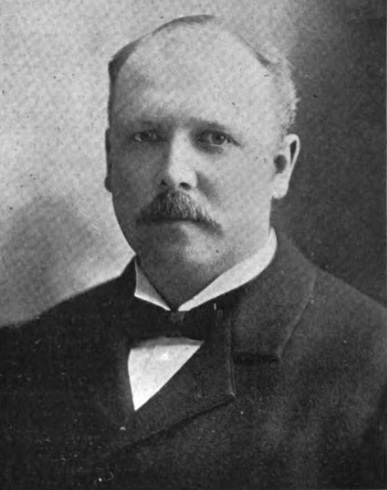
- Harper's Weekly, July 17, 1897

Collector of the Port of New York
- In office 1897–1901
- President: William McKinley
- Preceded by: James Truesdell Kilbreth
- Succeeded by: Nevada N. Stranahan

Personal details
- Born: November 8, 1858 Buffalo, New York
- Died: March 16, 1948 (aged 89) Brightwaters, New York
- Party: Republican

George R. Bidwell (November 8, 1858 – March 16, 1948) was a pioneering American bicycle salesman and manufacturer. Active in politics as a Republican, from July 14, 1897, to April 3, 1902, he was Collector of the Port of New York.

== Biography ==
=== Bicycle salesman ===
George Rogers Bidwell was born in Buffalo, New York, on November 8, 1858. His father Charles S. Bidwell was a prominent Buffalo shipbuilder, and his grandfather Benjamin Bidwell, also a shipwright, had constructed several ships for Matthew C. Perry's fleet during the War of 1812. Bidwell was educated in the public schools of Buffalo before beginning his career in bicycle sales and manufacturing.

Bidwell saw his first bicycle at the 1876 Centennial Exposition in Philadelphia and soon bought one for himself. After becoming a proficient bike rider and mechanic, Bidwell later inquired to Albert Augustus Pope, a prominent bicycle manufacturer, about becoming a salesman. Pope told Bidwell about his new Columbia bicycles, one of which Bidwell promptly ordered so he could study its design and workings.

After being brought into Pope's organization, Bidwell proved to be a successful salesman, and Pope promoted him to superintendent of agencies, responsible for supervising the retail locations and franchises that sold the Pope company's products. In 1880, Bidwell became one of the charter members of the newly-formed League of American Wheelmen. In 1881, Bidwell acceded to Pope's request that he move to New York City to take a sales position at E. I. Horsman's sporting goods store, which Pope hoped would result in increased sales. At a conference of the League of American Wheelmen, Bidwell saw a modern safety bicycle, a Rover designed by John Kemp Starley. Bidwell saw immediately that the safety would replace the Penny-farthing or "ordinary" bicycle with a high front wheel that was then the industry standard, and recommended that Pope start production of safeties, but Pope refused. Bidwell then left Pope to start his own corporation, the George R. Bidwell Company, which made safeties and conducted research and development on bicycle design and function.

In 1890, Bidwell's research and development let him to become the first American bicycle maker to use pneumatic tires. He lost a lawsuit that accused him of patent infringement for using pneumatic tires, but won an 1892 appeal of the original ruling against him. Bidwell lost so much money fighting the lawsuit that he needed to acquire outside investors, which he was unable to find. His company went into receivership, and he ceased making pneumatic tires, but kept the company operating until his appointment as Collector.

=== Political career ===
As a member of the League of American Wheelmen, Bidwell had lobbied for laws protecting cyclists. In 1894, Bidwell became secretary of the New York County Republican Committee, and served for two years. Afterwards, Bidwell took over Republican operations in New York City's Nineteenth Assembly District.

In 1897, Bidwell was appointed as Collector of the Port of New York by President William McKinley. Prior to the adoption of the Sixteenth Amendment, customs duties (tariffs) and excise taxes were the primary sources of federal government revenue, and as the largest port in the United States at the time (by 1910, the port was the busiest in the world), the Port of New York was therefore the single most important source of federal government income. These factors led the office of Collector of the Port of New York to be described as "the prize plum of Federal patronage not only in this State but perhaps in the country, outside of positions in the Cabinet."

In 1901, new President Theodore Roosevelt decided to replace Bidwell with New York State Senator Nevada N. Stranahan, against the wishes of Senator Thomas C. Platt. Bidwell's term in office officially ended when Stranahan was confirmed in April 1902.

A private act of the 58th United States Congress in March 1904, indemnified Bidwell, his predecessor James T. Kilbreth (posthumously), and his successor Nevada N. Stranahan as collectors of customs for the district and port of New York for the losses through embezzlement by Byram W. Winters, a customs service clerk. Stranahan received a refund in the sum of $8,821.44 from the federal government, having personally settled the entire amount of the fraud.

== Later life ==
After a career in bicycle manufacturing, Bidwell later turned his interests to the automobile and established a factory in Pottstown, Pennsylvania, for making truck engines. During World War I, Bidwell converted his Pottstown factory to the manufacture of artillery shells.

Bidwell died in Brightwaters, New York, on March 16, 1948.

== Legacy ==
Bidwell's papers are part of the collections of the Hofstra University Library.

Government offices
Preceded by James Truesdell Kilbreth	Collector of the Port of New York; 1897-1901	Succeeded by Nevada N. Stranahan
