= William S. Hults Jr. =

New York politician

- Born: William Sanford Hults; May 18, 1906; Port Washington, New York, U.S.
- Died: November 13, 1999 (aged 93); Florida, U.S.
- Occupation: Politician
- Spouse: Ann E. (died 1996)
- Relatives: 2 kids

William Sanford Hults (June 18, 1906 – November 13, 1999) was an American politician from New York.

== Early life ==
He was born on June 18, 1906, in Port Washington, Nassau County, New York. He attended the local schools, and then joined his father's contracting business.

== Career ==
Hults was a member of the New York State Assembly (Nassau Co., 2nd D.) in 1943 and 1944. He was a member of the New York State Senate (3rd D.) from 1945 to 1959, sitting in the 165th, 166th, 167th, 168th, 169th, 170th, 171st and 172nd New York State Legislatures.

He resigned his seat, and was appointed on April 1, 1959, by Gov. Nelson Rockefeller as New York State Commissioner of Motor Vehicles. On November 10, 1966, he tendered his resignation as Commissioner, effective December 31. Afterwards he moved to West Palm Beach, Florida.

== Personal life ==
He married Ann E. (1909–1996), and they had two children. Hults died on November 13, 1999; and was buried at the Lake Worth Memory Gardens in Lake Worth, Florida.

== See also ==
- Joseph P. Kelly (New York politician)

== Sources ==
New York State Assembly
Preceded by Norman F. Penny	New York State Assembly; Nassau County, 2nd District; 1943–1944	Succeeded by Joseph F. Carlino
New York State Senate
Preceded by John V. Downey	New York State Senate; 3rd District; 1945–1959	Succeeded by Genesta M. Strong
Government offices
Preceded by Joseph P. Kelly	State Commissioner of Motor Vehicles; 1959–1966	Succeeded by Vincent L. Tofany
