= Nevada N. Stranahan =

American politician

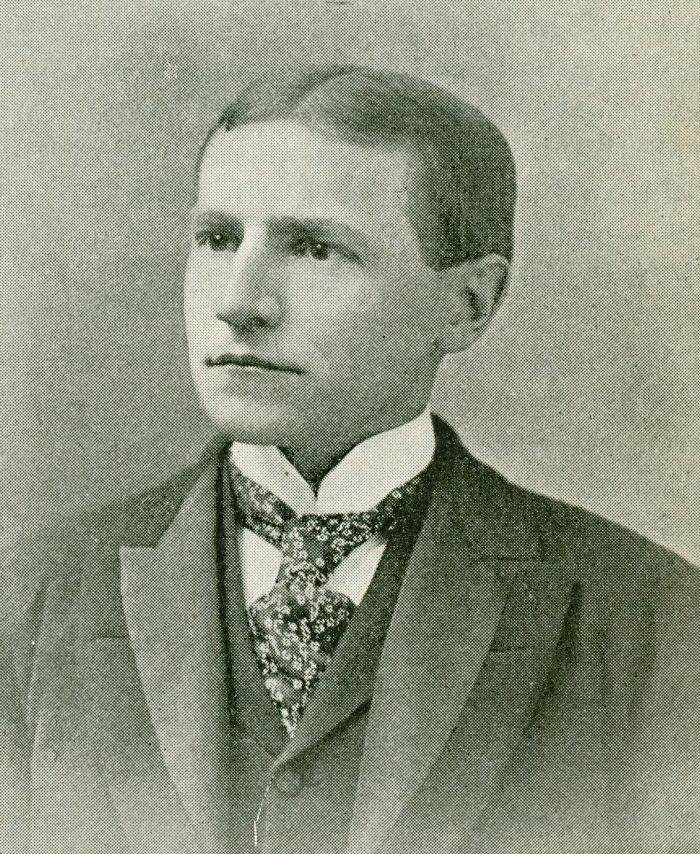

Collector of the Port of New York
- In office 1902–1907
- President: Theodore Roosevelt
- Preceded by: George R. Bidwell
- Succeeded by: Henry C. Stuart (Acting)

Member of the New York Senate from the 37th district
- In office 1896–1902
- Preceded by: New district
- Succeeded by: Francis H. Gates

Member of the New York State Assembly from the Oswego County, New York district
- In office 1890–1892
- Preceded by: S. Mortimer Coon
- Succeeded by: Danforth E. Ainsworth

Personal details
- Born: February 27, 1861 Oswego County, New York
- Died: July 6, 1928 (aged 67) Winwick, Northamptonshire, England
- Party: Republican party
- Education: Columbia Law School

Nevada Northrop Stranahan (February 27, 1861 – July 6, 1928) was a Collector of the Port of New York who was born in Oswego County, New York.

== Career ==
He studied law at Columbia Law School and was admitted to the bar. He was a member of the New York State Assembly (Oswego Co., 1st D.) in 1890, 1891 and 1892; and was District Attorney of Oswego County.

He was a member of the New York State Senate representing the 37th District from 1896 to 1902, sitting in the 119th, 120th, 121st, 122nd, 123rd, 124th and 125th New York State Legislatures. In March 1902, he was appointed by President Theodore Roosevelt as Collector of the Port of New York, and resigned his seat in the Senate. Illness forced him to resign the collectorship in 1907.

A private act of the 58th United States Congress in March 1904, compensated Stranahan, and his two predecessors James T. Kilbreth and George R. Bidwell for the losses through embezzlement by Byram W. Winters, a customs service clerk. Stranahan received a refund in the sum of $8,821.44 from the federal government, having personally settled the entire amount of the fraud.

== Death ==
Stranahan died in Winwick, Northamptonshire, England on July 6, 1928. His wife Elsie died in 1922. Afterward he lived in Winwick with his daughter Louise, the wife of Major Henry Torrens. He was survived by his daughter and a sister, Cora Stranahan Woodward, of New York City.

New York State Assembly
Preceded by S. Mortimer Coon	New York State Assembly; Oswego County, 1st District; 1890–1892	Succeeded by Danforth E. Ainsworth
New York State Senate
Preceded by New district	New York State Senate; 37th District; 1896–1902	Succeeded by Francis H. Gates
Government offices
Preceded by George R. Bidwell	Collector of the Port of New York; 1902–1907	Succeeded by Henry C. Stuart; Acting
