= Sid LeProtti =

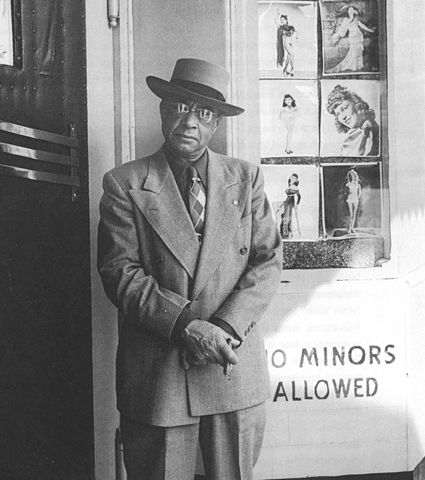
- LeProtti in 1953

Background information
- Birth name: Louis Sidney LeProtti
- Also known as: Sid Le Protti
- Born: November 25, 1886; Oakland, California
- Died: August 30, 1958 (aged 71); Walnut Creek, California
- Genres: Jazz, Dixieland, Ragtime
- Occupation(s): Musician, bandleader
- Instrument: Piano
- Years active: 1890s-1950s
- Formerly of: So Different Jazz Band, Sid Le Protti's Crescent Orchestra

Sid LeProtti (also spelled Le Protti) was a pianist and bandleader from Oakland, California active in the Barbary Coast. Born to an African American mother and Italian immigrant father, he was raised by his maternal grandparents. He learned classical piano music as a child from a German immigrant teacher. He first heard ragtime music around the age of 10. LeProtti led the So Different Jazz Band, the house band of the dance club of the same name in the Barbary Coast, from 1907 to 1917.

In addition to classical and ragtime music, LeProtti and other musicians in San Francisco clubs during the early 20th century played round dances like mazurkas, waltzes, two-steps, marches, polkas, and schottisches.

Later in life, LeProtti was interviewed by George Avakian and Turk Murphy about his life and music.

== See also ==
- West Coast Dixieland Revival
- Black and tan clubs
