= Alice Davis Menken =

American social relief worker (1870–1936)

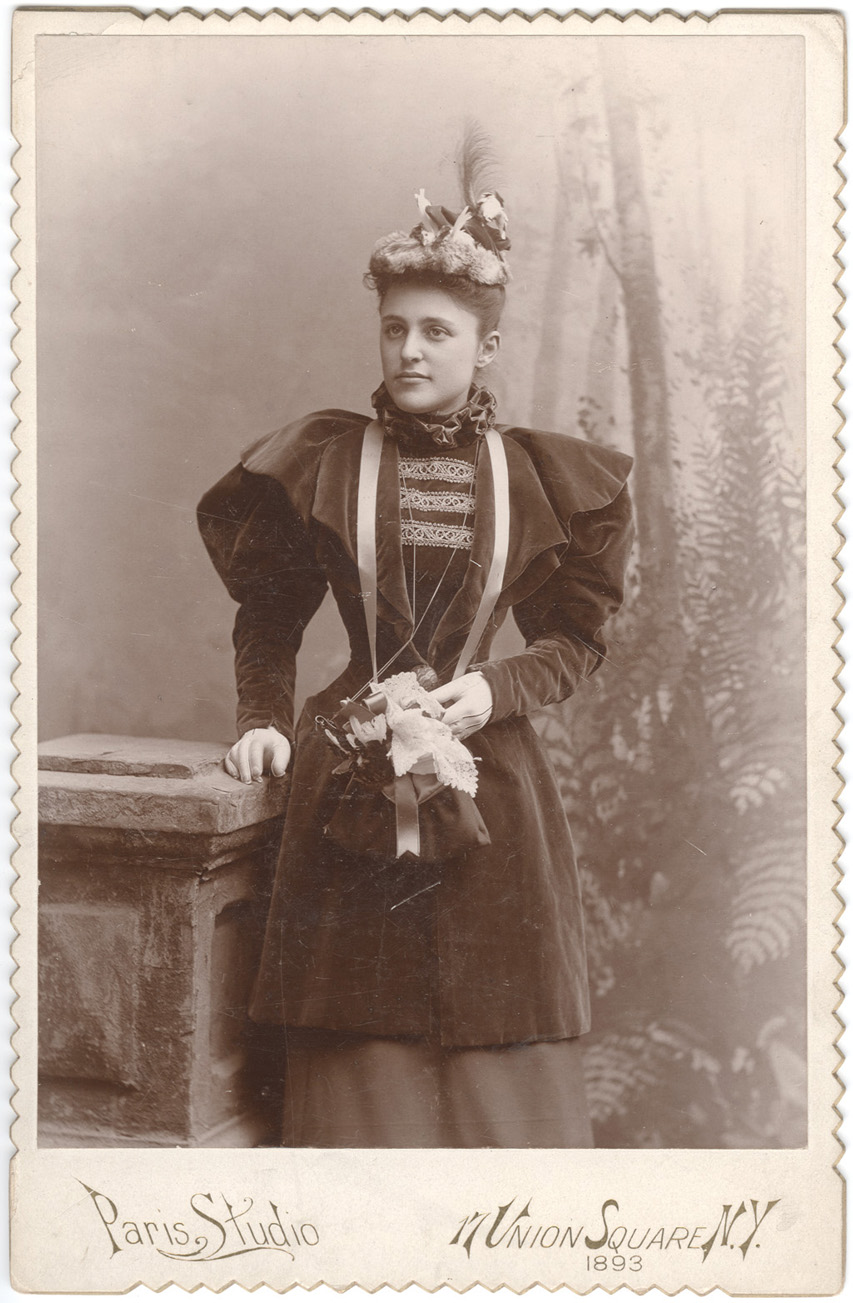
- Menken in Union Square studio, 1893
- Born: August 4, 1870; New York City, New York, United States
- Died: March 23, 1936 (aged 65); New York City, New York, United States
- Known for: Social relief work, especially with female Jewish immigrant delinquency

Alice Davis Marks Menken (August 4, 1870 – March 23, 1936) was a Jewish American known for her social work, particularly with female Jewish immigrant juvenile delinquency.

== Early life and career ==
Alice Davis Marks was born in New York City on August 4, 1870, to Michael Marks and Miriam (Maduro Peixotto) Davis, the third of their seven children. Both the Davis and Peixotto families were distinguished Sephardic families long resident in New York City. Her family was active in their Manhattan temple, Congregation Shearith Israel, where her great-grandfather, Moses Levi Maduro Peixotto, had been one of its first cantors. In her youth, Davis Menken attended the Gardner Institute and the New York School for Community Workers. On October 17, 1893, she married Mortimer Morange Menken, an attorney and descendant of Rabbi Gershom Seixas. Their only son, Harold Davis Menken, was born two years later. She served in the Women's Motor Corps during World War I.

Davis Menken became known for her social work. She was an active member of the National Council of Jewish Women, a trustee of the Federation of Jewish Philanthropies and Women's Branch of Union of Orthodox Jewish Congregations, and 27-year sisterhood president of her temple, Shearith Israel (1901–1928). She co-founded the Shearith Israel Sisterhood in 1896. In 1905 she was a member of the Committee of Fourteen. Davis Menken began her career in social relief work at the sisterhood's settlement Neighborhood House, which worked with the surrounding Jewish immigrant community, especially those who arrived in 1908 to escape the Ottoman Empire. This experience led to her interest in helping to stem increased juvenile delinquency in female Jewish immigrant populations. Davis Menken founded the Jewish Board of Guardians in 1907, which increased delinquent supervision after probation to three years. In 1908, she started a sisterhood committee to help the New York City Probation Department in the Women's Night Court, which helped Jewish women in the court until the court was dissolved eleven years later. She later started the Jewish Big Sister Movement.

She was president of the Society for Political Study from 1911 to 1913, and worked as a trustee with the Institute for Instruction of Deaf Mutes, and as a director of the Florence Crittendon League. As an expert on prison reform, New York Governor Alfred Smith appointed her to the New York State Reformatory for Women board of managers in 1920, and she also sat on the National Committee on Prisons and Prison Labor. Davis Menken authored several books pertaining to women's social welfare, including a book on prison reform. She was also a member of the Republican Party, Women's City Club, and the National Probation Association. Her husband died January 1, 1930.

Davis Menken died March 23, 1936, in her New York City Hotel Westover apartment.

== Selected works ==
- Hints for Meeting the Problem of Maladjusted Youth: A Study in Social Work for Beginners (1922)
- "The Rehabilitation of the Morally Handicapped." Journal of the American Institute of Criminal Law and Criminology 16 (May 1924): 147–154.
- On the Side of Mercy: Problems in Social Readjustment (1933)

== Notes and references ==
Notes

Sources

- Herman, Felicia (March 20, 2009). "Alice Davis Menken". Jewish Women: A Comprehensive Historical Encyclopedia. Jewish Women's Archive. Archived from the original on May 4, 2014.
- Klapper, Melissa R. (2005). "Jewish Girls Coming of Age in America, 1860-1920". New York: New York University Press. p. 252. Archived from the original on May 4, 2014 – via Questia.
- "M.M. MENKEN DEAD; PROMINENT LAWYER: Had Devoted Much of His Life to Religious and Philanthropic Work". The New York Times. January 2, 1930. p. 20. ProQuest 98685336. (Subscription required.)
- "ASSOCIATES MOURN MRS. M.M. MENKEN: Her Work in Behalf of Social Welfare Eulogized by Rev. David De Sola Pool". The New York Times. March 26, 1936. p. 23. ProQuest 101899463. (Subscription required.)
- Rogow, Faith (1993). "Gone to Another Meeting: The National Council of Jewish Women, 1893-1993". Tuscaloosa: University of Alabama Press. p. 232. Archived from the original on June 8, 2013 – via Questia.

Additional sources

- "Guide to the Papers of Alice Davis Menken (1870-1936), undated, 1882-1936". American Jewish Historical Society.
