= Joseph P. Kelly (New York politician) =

American politician in New York (1894–1968)

41st Collector of the Port of New York
- In office 1961–1966
- Preceded by: James R. Macduff
- Succeeded by: Office abolished

Commissioner of the New York State Department of Motor Vehicles
- In office 1955–1959
- Governor: W. Averell Harriman
- Preceded by: James R. Macduff
- Succeeded by: William S. Hults Jr.

Personal details
- Born: January 6, 1894
- Died: September 2, 1968 (aged 74) Trumbull, Connecticut, U.S.
- Party: Democratic

Joseph P. Kelly (January 6, 1894 – September 2, 1968) was an American politician from New York.

== Early life ==
He was born on January 6, 1894, in New York.

== Career ==
Kelly was appointed on February 16, 1955, by Governor W. Averell Harriman as New York State Commissioner of Motor Vehicles. He remained in office until March 1959.

On June 1, 1961, he was nominated by President John F. Kennedy as Collector of the Port of New York. He was confirmed by the U.S. Senate, and took office on July 5, 1961. Kelly was the last person to hold this office which was abolished in 1966 when the structure of the United States Customs Service was changed.

== Death ==
He died on September 2, 1968, in the St. Joseph's Manor nursing home in Trumbull, Connecticut.

== See also ==
- Chester A. Arthur

== Sources ==
Government offices
Preceded by James R. Macduff	State Commissioner of Motor Vehicles; 1955–1959	Succeeded by William S. Hults Jr.
Preceded by Robert W. Dill	Collector of the Port of New York; 1961–1966	Succeeded by office abolished
