= Black and tan clubs =

Mixed-race clubs in early 20th century US

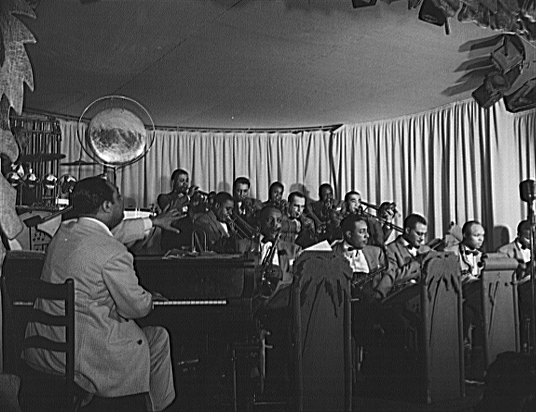
Duke Ellington, directing, at the Hurricane Ballroom

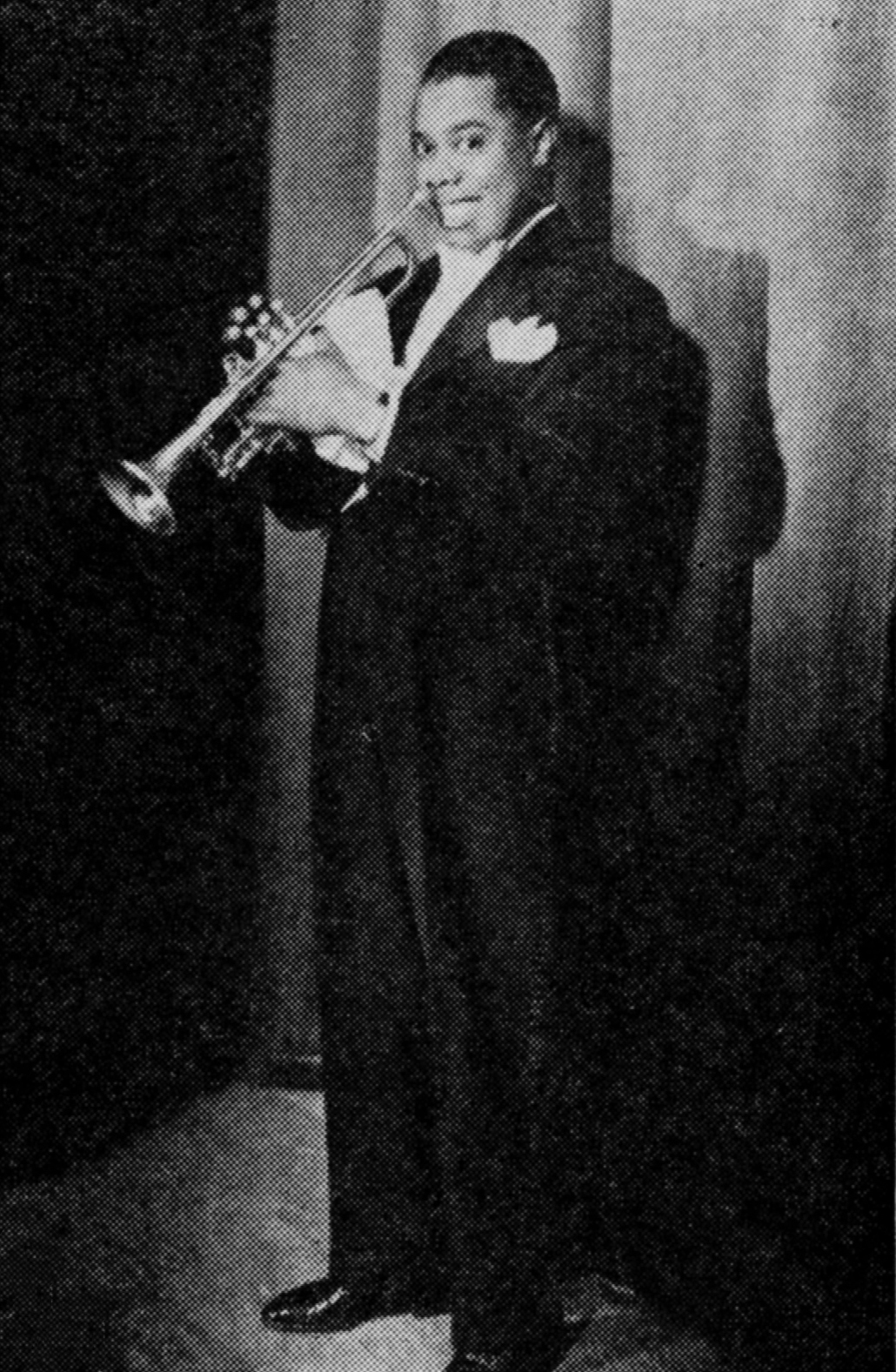
Jazz trumpeter and singer Louis Armstrong, in 1936

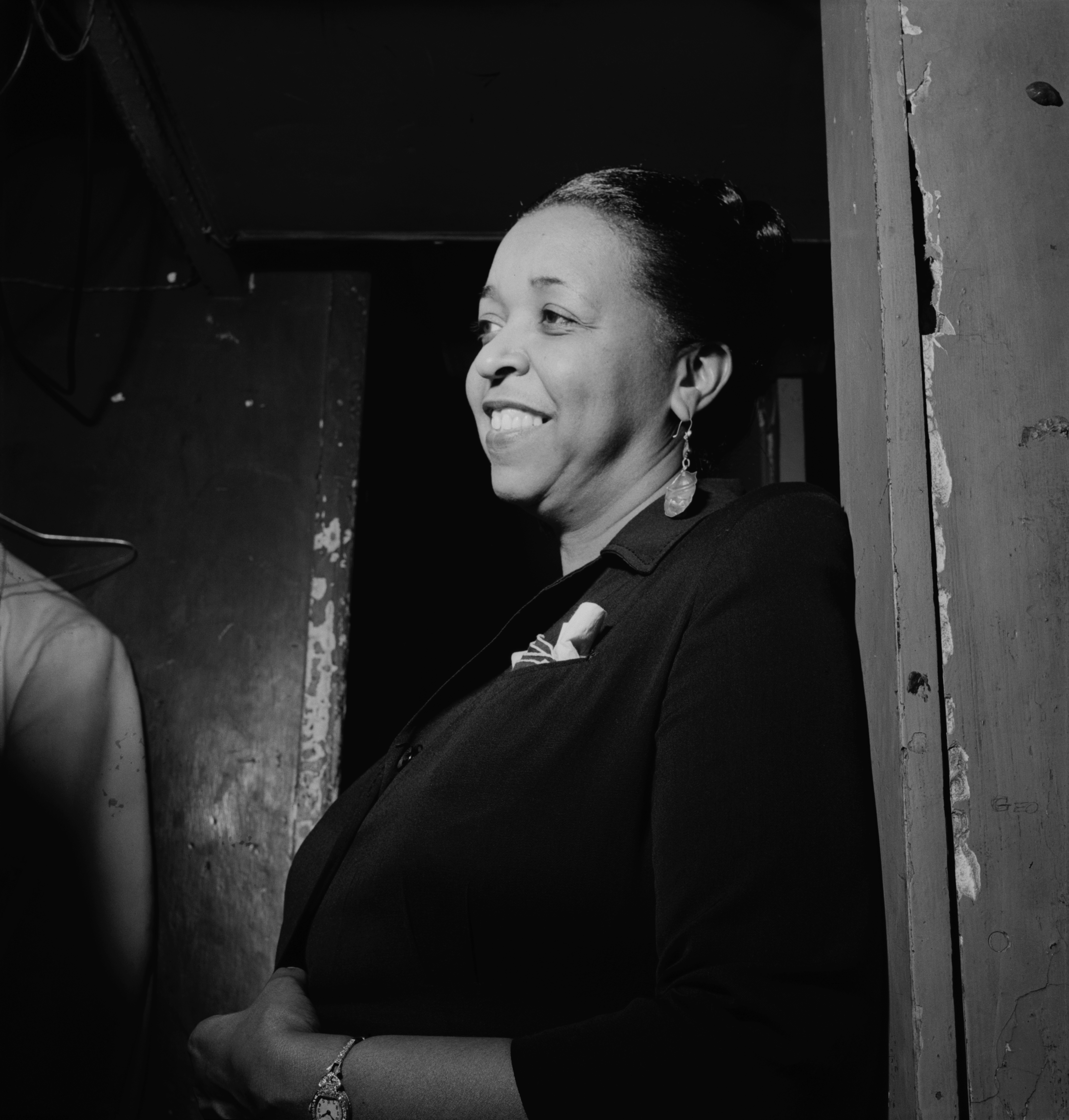
Ethel Waters sang "Stormy Weather" at the Cotton Club.

Black and tan clubs were nightclubs in the United States in the early 20th century catering to the black and mixed-race ("tan") population. They flourished in the speakeasy era and were often popular places of entertainment linked to the early jazz years. With time, the definition simply came to mean clubs with black and white clienteles.

The black populations of the large Northern cities in which these clubs arose (e.g. Cincinnati, Manhattan, San Francisco, Seattle) consisted of immigrants, recently arrived from rural areas (especially, from the South). In this context of rural-urban and North-South migration, the Black and Tan clubs provided a cultural haven and "refuge for new ethnic immigrants to continue practicing their cultural traditions". Though often owned by whites, the Clubs also offered a springboard to success for black musicians. They provided opportunities for local talent and hosted nationally acclaimed jazz musicians, sometimes launching their careers (e.g. Ethel Waters, Jelly Roll Morton, Louis Armstrong and Cab Calloway).

Although originally conceived as a venue for blacks, the liberal attitudes of the clubs often attracted both whites and black and offered a place for "social exchange between races that were discouraged in other public spaces." Indeed, many "white musicians came to the black sections of towns to listen to black jazz and learn from black musicians". The Clubs attracted artists and Bohemians of both races.

Nevertheless, this was a highly imperfect inter-mixing of white and black America. Some of the clubs catered to an almost exclusively white clientele, with blacks intervening only as performers and servers (e.g. the Cotton Club and the Plantation Club in Harlem). Furthermore, white customers at the clubs may have been seen by black customers as 'slumming' intruders, but, for owners, whites were generally welcomed as a paying clientele.

The clubs were viewed as socially and sexually disreputable by both blacks and whites in the wider society of the time. Informed by the sensationalist coverage in the printed press, whites feared that the clubs encouraged crime, racial impurity and moral corruption. This fear is exemplified in a 1914 letter written by a leading citizen of New York (the General Secretary of the Committee of Fourteen) who laments that the Black and Tan clubs were "catering not only to whites, as well as blacks, stimulating a mixing of the races." Indeed, some clubs dealt with this mutual fear and distrust by physically separating blacks and whites within the venue while other clubs provided separate hours for white and black clientele.

== Specific clubs ==
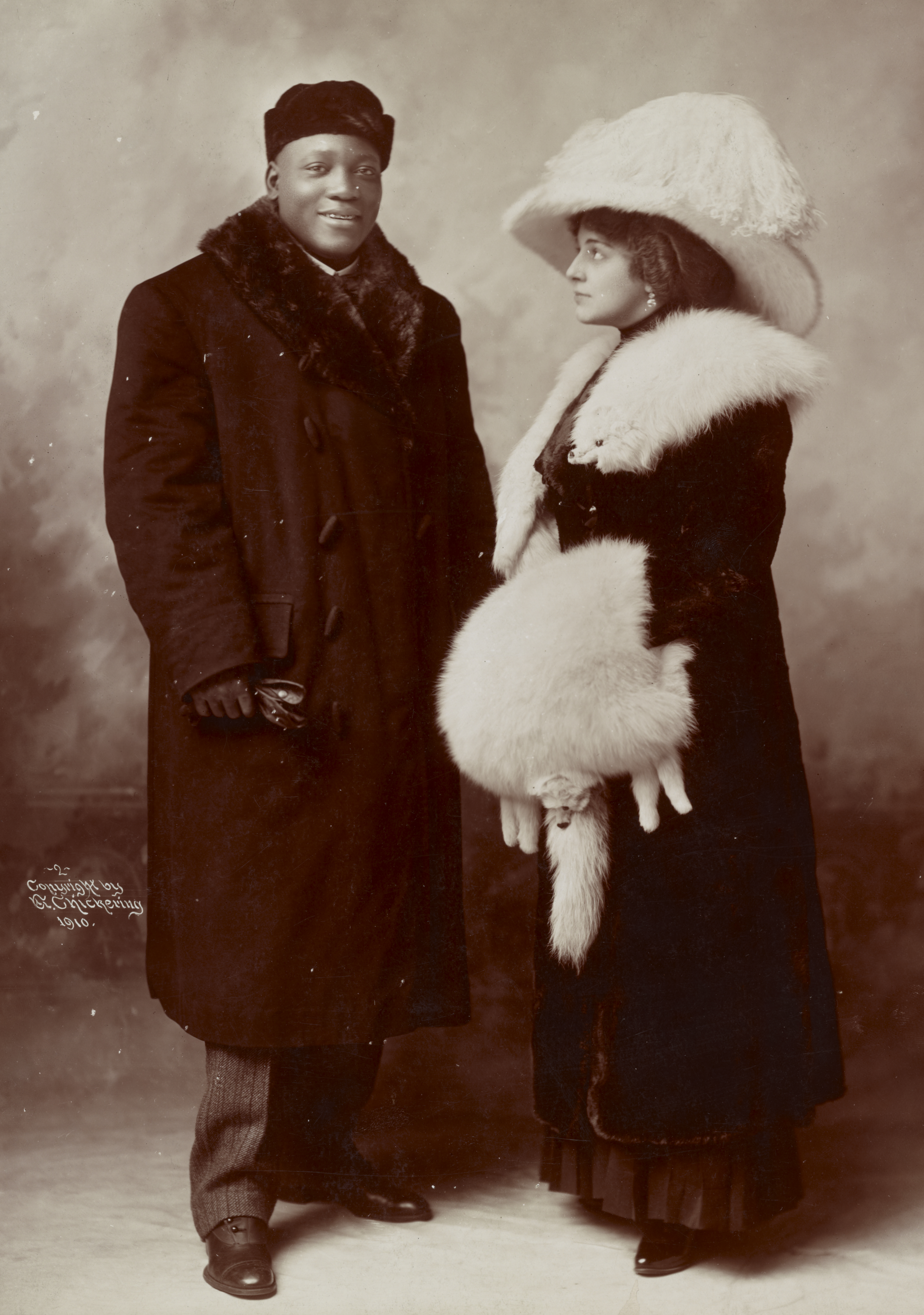
Jack Johnson with his wife Etta Duryea, who killed herself in 1912

=== Café de Champion, Chicago ===
On 10 July 1912 the prize fighter and heavyweight champion of the world, Jack Johnson opened the Café de Champion at 41 West 31st Street in the Bronzeville district of Chicago. It was one of the first truly opulent buildings to cater for African Americans and boasted features such as electric fans to cool the interior (some of the first in the city). The Chicago Tribune on the following day announced only 17 of Chicago's 120,000 coloured population did not attend the opening night party. Whilst this is clearly an exaggeration, there may well have been the majority of all young black couples at the party, possibly more than 5000 persons.

The building occupied three floors. Johnson's wife Etta ran the restaurant, where the waiters all wore white gloves. There was a further private dining area on the second floor. The elaborate bar was made of mahogany. Music and dancing took place in the Pompeiian Room which was decorated in the Roman style. Johnson himself played the "bull fiddle" (Double bass) in the band.

This pre-Prohibition club could sell alcohol when it first opened. It was restricted to a 1 a.m. closure but frequently breached this, leading to calls for revocation of its license.

The top floor served as accommodation for the Johnsons. Etta committed suicide in the apartment on 11 September 1912, shooting herself in the head during a night of revelry below. Johnson was forced to quit the premises in November 1912 due to multiple scandals.

=== Sunset Café, Chicago ===
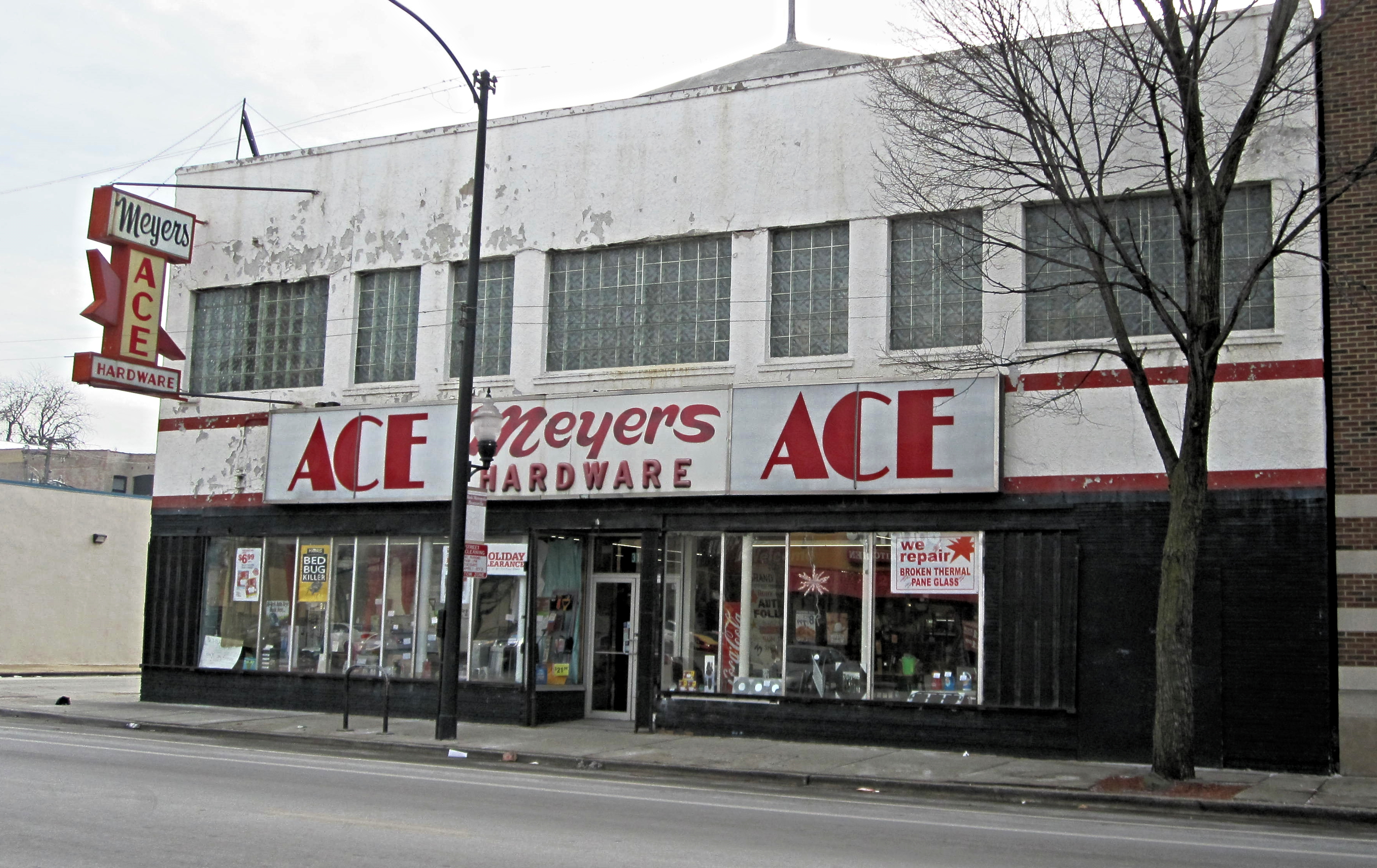
The Ace Hardware store now occupying the building that used to house the Sunset Café in Chicago

The Sunset Café, also known as the Grand Terrace Café or simply Grand Terrace, operated during the 1920s, 1930s and 1940s. It was one of the most important jazz clubs in America, especially during the period between 1917 and 1928 when Chicago became a creative capital of jazz innovation and again during the emergence of bebop in the early 1940s. From its inception, the club was a rarity as a haven from segregation, since it was an integrated club where blacks, along with other ethnicities, could mingle with whites without much fear of reprisal. Many important musicians developed their careers at the Sunset/Grand Terrace Café.

=== Cotton Club, Harlem ===
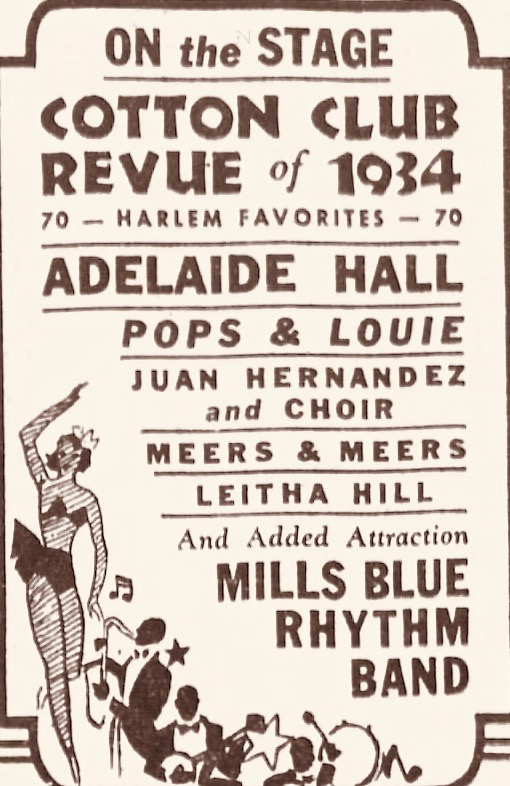
Adelaide Hall starring in the Cotton Club Revue of 1934 at the Loew's Metropolitan Theater, Brooklyn, commencing on 7 September 1934 (advertisement)

After the success of his first establishment in Chicago, Jack Johnson opened a second club in Harlem, New York in 1920 under the name of Club Deluxe. He sold it to a white New York gangster, Owney Madden, in 1923. Madden changed the name to Cotton Club. Despite being opened as a black and tan club, it restricted its clientele to only white customers with the service staff and almost all entertainers being black. Rare exceptions to the whites-only rule were made for black celebrities such as Ethel Waters and Bill Robinson. It reproduced the racist imagery of the era, often depicting black people as savages in exotic jungles or as "darkies" in the plantation South. A 1938 menu included this imagery, with illustrations done by Julian Harrison, showing naked black men and women dancing around a drum in the jungle. Tribal mask illustrations make up the border of the menu. The race riots of Harlem in 1935 forced the Cotton Club to close until late 1936 when it reopened at Broadway and 48th Street.

=== Plantation Club, Harlem ===
The Plantation Club opened as a rival to the Cotton Club in December 1929 and was housed in a former Harlem dance academy. It spawned much black talent, including Josephine Baker and Cab Calloway. The Club catered to white clients. A destructive attack on the club by the Cotton Club raised little sympathy amongst the black locals. The club closed in 1940.

=== Smalls Paradise, Harlem ===
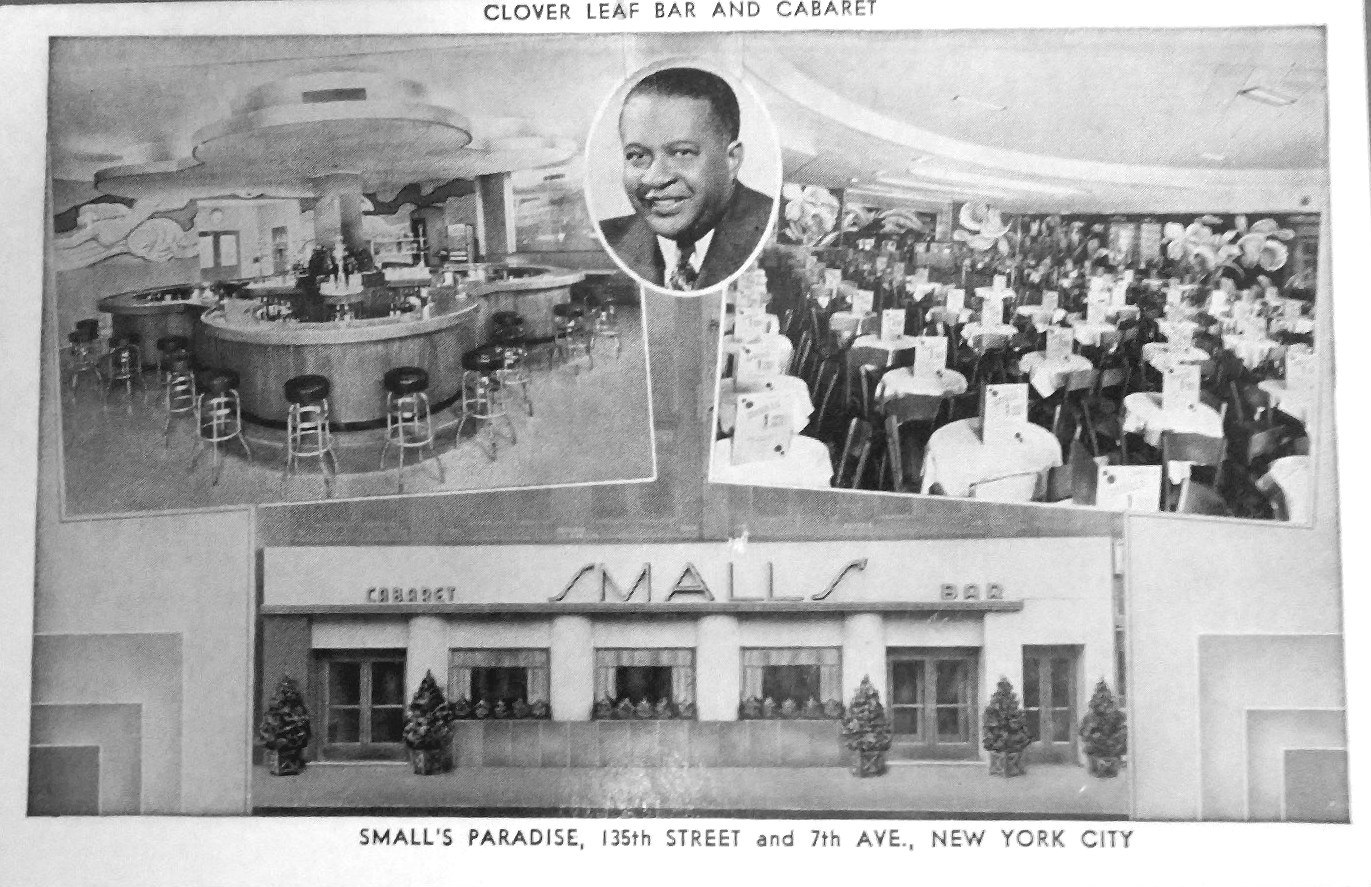
Small's Paradise postcard (1942) in Harlem

Smalls Paradise was located in the basement of 2294 Adam Clayton Powell Jr. Boulevard at 134th Street. It opened in 1925 and was owned by Ed Smalls (né Edwin Alexander Smalls; 1882–1976). At the time of the Harlem Renaissance, Smalls Paradise was the only one of the well-known Harlem night clubs to be owned by an African-American and integrated.

During Ed Small's ownership of the club, he organized many gala charity events, with the proceeds donated to help the needy of the Harlem community. One memorable gala in 1931 featured Bill "Bojangles" Robinson. Entertainers from both the Cotton Club and Connie's Inn made appearances at the event with the permission of the clubs' management. Ed Smalls was doing well enough at the time of the club's tenth year in business to greatly expand the Smalls Paradise floor space by moving the club's bar upstairs. Many well known musicians, both white and African-American, appeared at the club over the years and often came to Smalls after their evening engagements to jam with the Smalls Paradise band. The club was responsible for promoting popular dances such as the Charleston, the Madison and the Twist. Smalls Paradise was the longest-operating club in Harlem before it closed in 1986.

=== Café Society, New York City ===
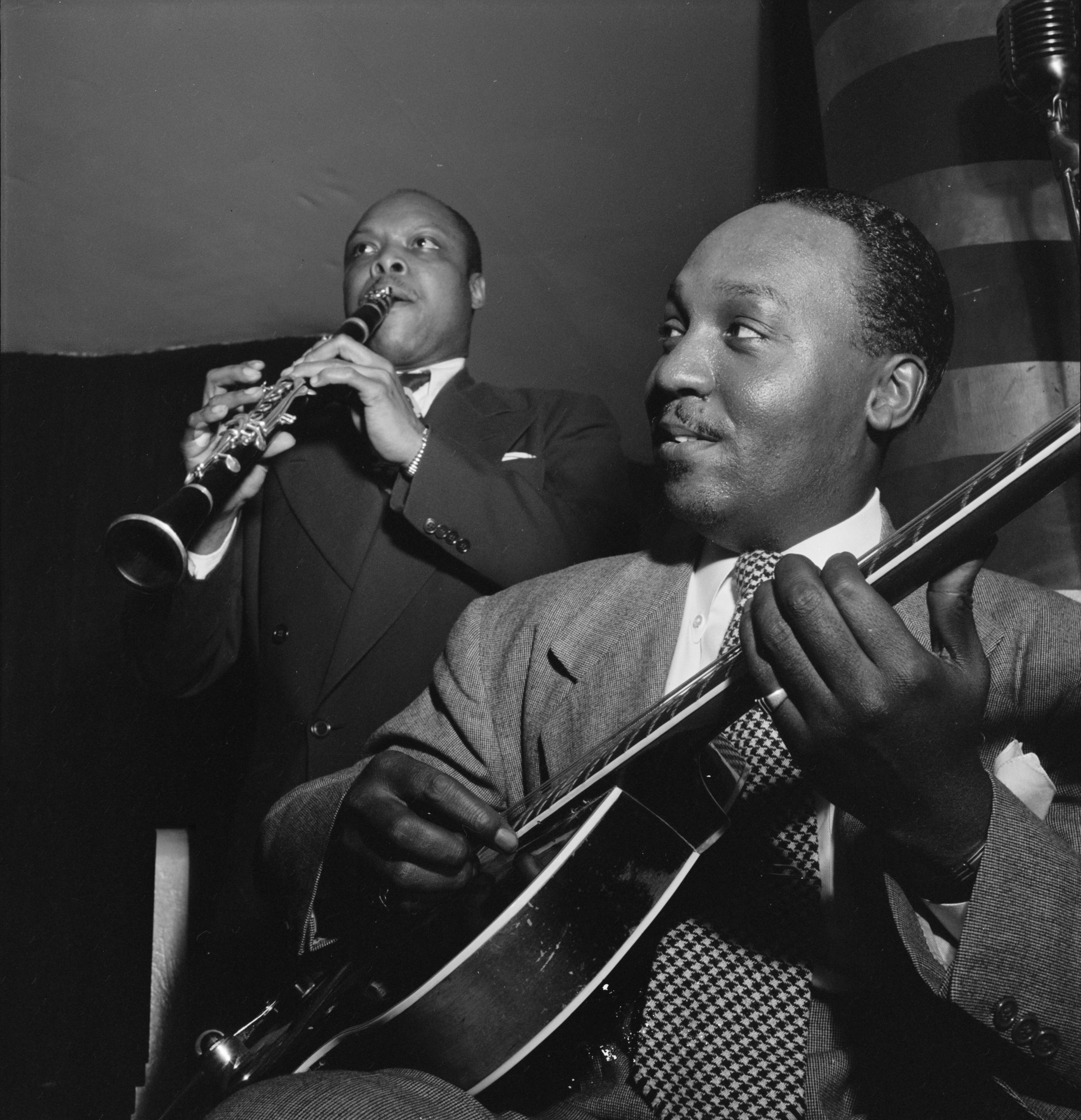
Al Casey and Eddie Barefield in Café Society

Café Society was opened by Barney Josephson in a basement at 2 Sheridan Square in New York City in 1938. The club prided itself on treating black and white customers equally, unlike many venues, such as the Cotton Club, which featured black performers but barred black customers except for prominent black people in the entertainment industry. Josephson helped launch the careers of Ruth Brown, Lena Horne, Billie Holiday, dancer Pearl Primus, Hazel Scott, Pete Johnson, Albert Ammons, Big Joe Turner, and popularized gospel groups such as the Dixie Hummingbirds and the Golden Gate Quartet among white audiences. Albert Ammons played piano and Big Joe Turner sang blues. Comedy was provided by Jack Gilford. Hazel Scott was highly successful at this venue and gained national recognition there.

In 1940, Josephson opened Cafe Society Uptown at East 58th Street.

=== Wein Bar, Cincinnati ===
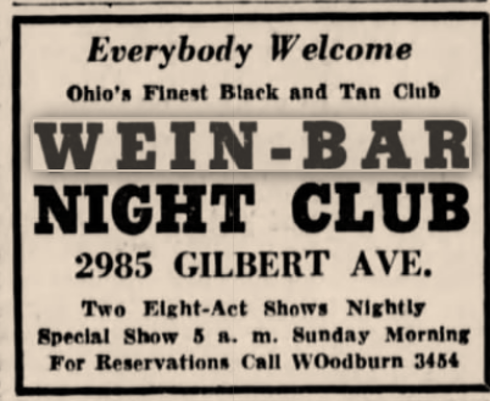
Wein Bar advertisement (c. 1938) in Cincinnati

The Wein Bar, located in Cincinnati, Ohio was founded in 1934 by Joseph Goldhagen, who was active in the commercial production of illegal alcohol until the Prohibition period ended. During the 1930's, the bar had multiple live performances daily, and over time, the bar evolved into an R&B live performance venue with regional and national music entertainment. Popular musicians include; Fats Waller, Lionel Hampton, Lou Rawls, James Brown and notably the formation of the James Brown funk era band (The J.B.'s) occurred during a live fundraising performance at the bar. From the early years, it was a meeting place for planning civil rights activism, organizing travel outside the region for protests events, and was an ongoing fund raising location for the NAACP. The bar was closed in 1980 after more than 40 years of operation, and was possibly the longest operating establishment that catered to the black community, its musicians, and in active support of their civil rights.

=== Purcell's So Different Cafe, San Francisco ===
Purcell's So Different Cafe at 520 Pacific Street in San Francisco was part of the Terrific Street-entertainment district, famed for its music and dance, and was home to ragtime and jazz bands. It was opened by Sid LeProtti around 1910.

=== The Jupiter, San Francisco ===
The Jupiter club in San Francisco was opened by Jelly Roll Morton in 1917. It was located in a basement on Columbus Avenue and was open to all races. Due to police pressure Morton left the venture in 1922.

=== Spider Kelly's Saloon, San Francisco ===
Spider Kelly, born James Curtin, was a lightweight boxer and trainer who immigrated to San Francisco from Ireland while an adolescent. Formerly the Seattle Saloon at 574 Pacific Street in San Francisco the property was bought by "Spider" Kelly in 1919 and reopened specifically as a black and tan club. This dance hall was known as one of rowdiest clubs of Terrific Street.

=== Black and Tan Club, Seattle ===
The Black and Tan Club in Seattle was founded in 1922 in the wake of Prohibition, catering to the relatively small black and mixed-race population. It was held in a basement under a drug store at the junction of 12th Street and Jackson. By the onset of the Second World War the club was one of the most popular in the city, welcoming whites and Asians as well as its target clientele. Early performers in the club included Duke Ellington, Eubie Blake, Louis Jordan and Lena Horne. In the 1950s performers included Ray Charles, Charlie Parker, Count Basie and Ernestine Anderson. In 1964 the club gained notoriety as the site of a murder: being where Little Willie John stabbed Kendall Roundtree. With the demise of strict racial segregation in America the need for such clubs eased and the club closed in 1966.

== Other clubs ==
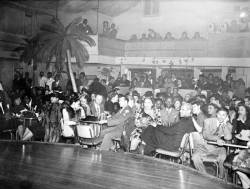
Ringside at the Club Alabam in Los Angeles, California

Other Harlem black and tans included Connie's Inn, Connor's Club, Edmund's Cellar, and Barron Wilkin's Club (also known as Barron's Exclusive Club).

Other Chicago black and tans included the Dreamland Club, and Royal Gardens (later known as Lincoln Gardens).

The Club Alabam in Los Angeles was a black-owned club that hosted major acts who performed in front of integrated crowds. It was located next door to the black-owned Dunbar Hotel, which accepted black guests and allowed black performers at the Club to be comfortably lodged.

The clubs were mainly located in the "slums", that is to say, the black neighborhoods. White people attending the clubs were therefore said to be "slumming it".

== Film ==
Black and Tan is a 1929 short film written and directed by Dudley Murphy. It is set during the contemporary Harlem Renaissance in New York City. It is the first film to feature Duke Ellington and his Orchestra performing as a jazz band, and was also the film debut of actress Fredi Washington. In 2015, the United States Library of Congress selected the film for preservation in the National Film Registry, finding it "culturally, historically, or aesthetically significant".

Black and Tan film (1929)

== See also ==
- Jazz age
