= Leonard Hall (New York politician) =

American politician

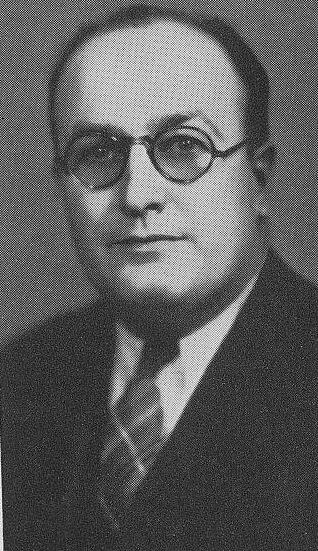
- Hall, c. 1944

Chair of the Republican National Committee
- In office April 10, 1953 – February 1, 1957
- Preceded by: C. Wesley Roberts
- Succeeded by: Meade Alcorn

Member of the U.S. House of Representatives from New York
- In office January 3, 1939 – December 31, 1952
- Preceded by: Robert L. Bacon
- Succeeded by: Steven Derounian
- Constituency: 1st district (1939–1945); 2nd district (1945–1952)

Member of the New York Assembly from Nassau's 2nd district
- In office January 1, 1934 – December 31, 1938
- Preceded by: Edwin Lynde
- Succeeded by: Norman Penny
- In office January 1, 1927 – December 31, 1928
- Preceded by: F. Trubee Davison
- Succeeded by: Edwin Lynde

Personal details
- Born: October 2, 1900 Oyster Bay, New York, U.S.
- Died: June 2, 1979 (aged 78) Glen Cove, New York, U.S.
- Party: Republican
- Spouse: Gladys Dowsey (m. 1934)
- Parents: Franklyn Herbert Hall (father); Mary Anne Garvin (mother)
- Education: Georgetown University
- Occupation: Lawyer; politician

Leonard Wood Hall (October 2, 1900 – June 2, 1979) was an American lawyer and politician who served seven terms as a United States representative from New York from 1939 to 1952.

== Early life and education ==
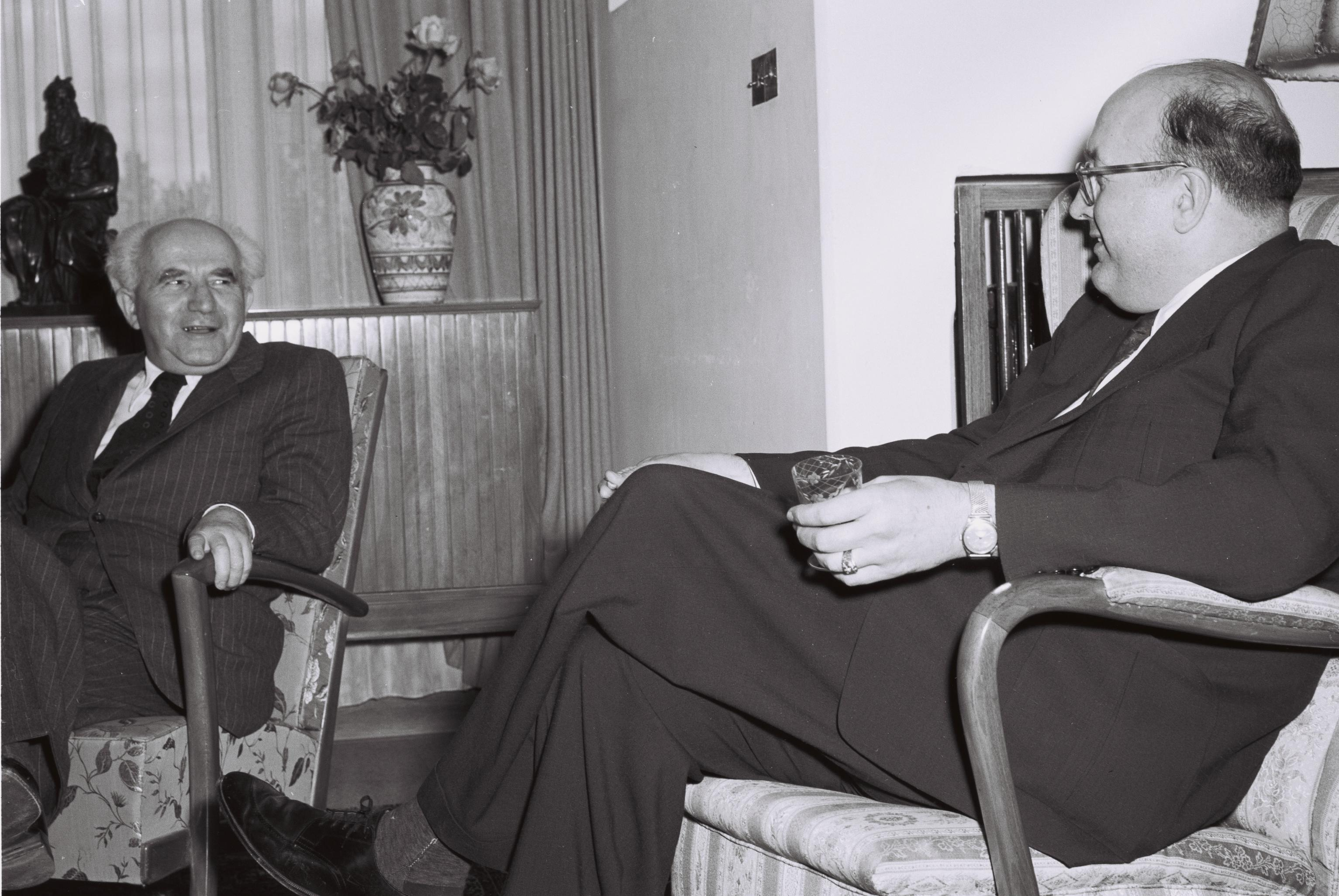
Leonard W. Hall (right) with Israel's Prime Minister David Ben-Gurion in Jerusalem, 1951

Hall was the son of Franklyn Herbert and Mary Anne (née Garvin) Hall. He was born at Sagamore Hill, the manor house of future President Theodore Roosevelt, near Oyster Bay, New York. Franklyn Hall was Roosevelt's coachman and White House librarian.

Hall attended public schools and graduated from the law department of Georgetown University in 1920. He was admitted to the bar in 1922 and commenced practice in New York City.

== Family ==
He married Gladys Dowsey, the daughter of local Republican political leader, on May 10, 1934, in Oyster Bay. She had two children from a previous marriage.

== Political career ==
He was a member of the New York State Assembly (Nassau Co., 2nd D.) in 1927 and 1928; Sheriff of Nassau County from 1929 to 1931; and again a member of the State Assembly in 1934, 1935, 1936, 1937 and 1938. He was a delegate to the 1948, 1952, 1956 and 1968 Republican National Conventions.

=== Congress ===
Hall was elected as a Republican to the 76th, 77th, 78th, 79th, 80th, 81st and 82nd United States Congresses, holding office from January 3, 1939, to December 31, 1952, when he resigned to take office as Surrogate of Nassau County. He resigned that office to become Chairman of the Republican National Committee, serving from 1953 to 1957.

== Later career ==
He was President Dwight D. Eisenhower's personal representative at opening of the Brussels World's Fair in April 1958, and resumed the practice of law in Garden City and New York City as senior partner in the firm of Hall Casey Dickler & Brady. Later that year he was a candidate for the Republican nomination for Governor of New York, but withdrew in favor of Nelson Rockefeller, who went on to defeat incumbent W. Averell Harriman in the general election.

In 1964, after Republican presidential nominee Barry M. Goldwater of Arizona named his friend of nearly three decades, Denison Kitchel, as the national campaign manager, a group of party establishment donors urged Goldwater to replace the inexperienced Kitchel with Hall, but Goldwater stood behind his initial choice.

== Death ==
Hall resided in Locust Valley and in 1979 died in Glen Cove. Interment was in Memorial Cemetery of St. John's Church (Episcopal), Laurel Hollow. Buried along with Hall in Memorial Cemetery are a number of other American celebrities, government officials, and political figures of the 20th century, including Henry L. Stimson, William S. Paley, and Arthur Dove.

New York State Assembly
Preceded by F. Trubee Davison	Member of the New York Assembly from Nassau's 2nd district 1927–1928	Succeeded by Edwin Lynde
Preceded by Edwin Lynde	Member of the New York Assembly from Nassau's 2nd district 1934–1938	Succeeded by Norman Penny
U.S. House of Representatives
Preceded by Robert L. Bacon	Member of the U.S. House of Representatives from New York's 1st congressional district 1939–1945	Succeeded by Edgar A. Sharp
Preceded by William Barry	Member of the U.S. House of Representatives from New York's 2nd congressional district 1945–1952	Succeeded by Steven Derounian
Party political offices
Preceded by C. Wesley Roberts	Chair of the Republican National Committee; 1953–1957	Succeeded by Meade Alcorn
