= Francis Hendricks =

American politician and businessman (1834–1920)

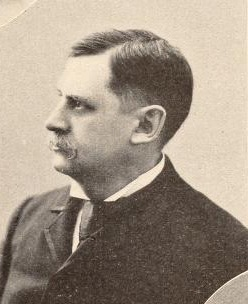
Francis Hendricks (1900)

Francis Hendricks (November 23, 1834 – June 9, 1920) was an American merchant, banker and politician from New York.

== Life ==
Hendricks was born on November 23, 1834, in Kingston, Ulster County, New York.

He attended the common schools and The Albany Academy. Then he engaged in the sale of photographic supplies in Syracuse from 1860 to 1916.

He served as a member of the Board of Fire Commissioners of Syracuse from 1877 to 1878; and was Mayor of Syracuse from 1880 to 1881.

He was a member of the New York State Assembly (Onondaga Co., 2nd D.) in 1884 and 1885. He was a member of the New York State Senate (25th D.) from 1886 to 1891, sitting in the 109th, 110th, 111th, 112th, 113th and 114th New York State Legislatures.

From September 28, 1891, to July 1893, Hendricks held the office of Collector of the Port of New York. He was also President of the State Bank of Syracuse. Governor Theodore Roosevelt appointed him as Superintendent of Insurance in February 1900, a post he held until May 1906.

In 1918, the veteran Hendricks lost the support of his ward and town leaders in the midst of the prohibition debate. After his defeat, Hendricks said he had "no desire to lead an organisation which has become the tool of the saloons."

He died on June 9, 1920, "after an illness of several weeks" in Syracuse, Onondaga County, New York.

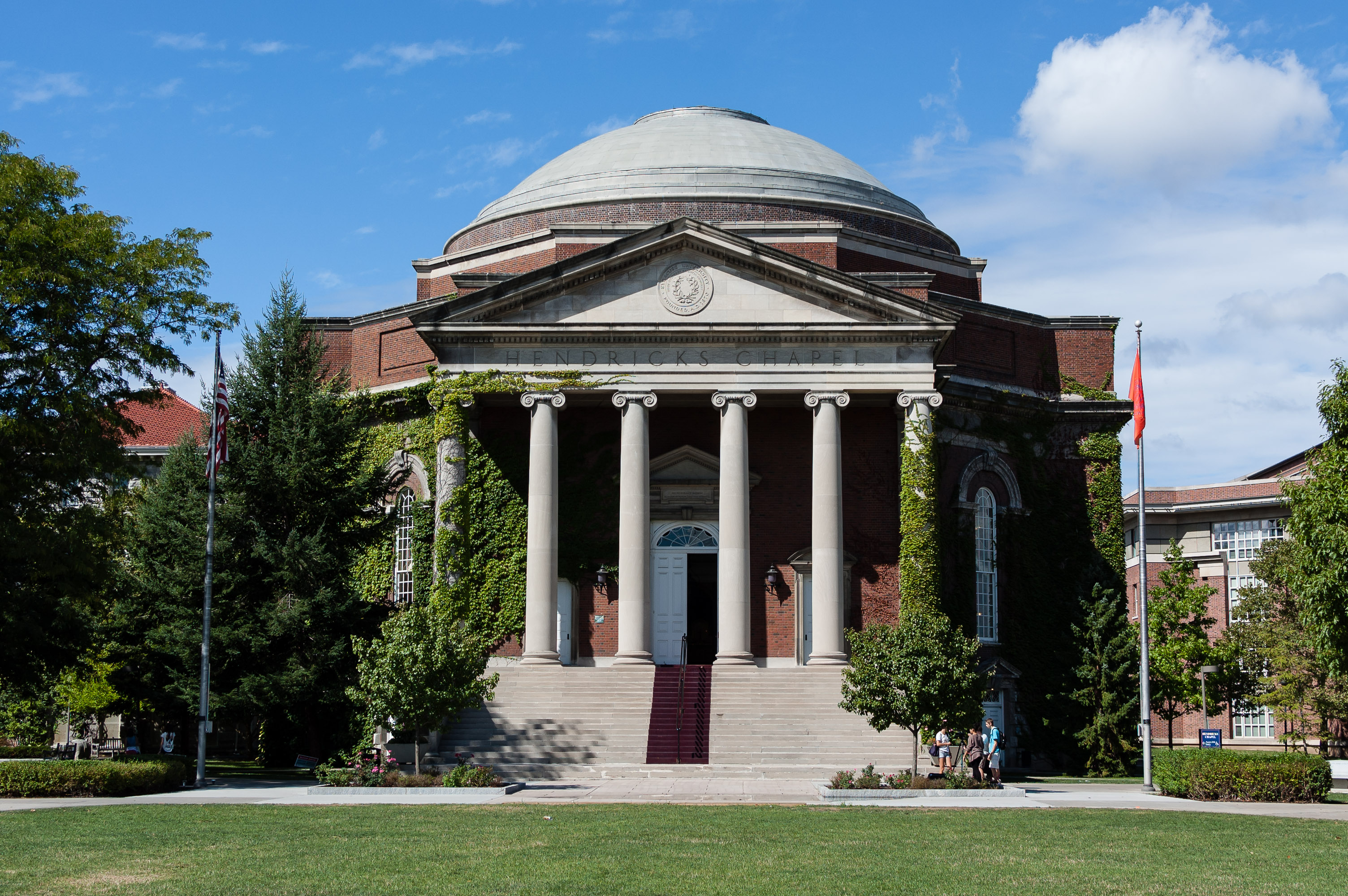
Hendricks Chapel, Syracuse University, 2012

== Legacy ==
Childless, in his will Hendricks left $500,000 to Syracuse University to build a chapel in memory of his wife, Eliza Jane. Today, Hendricks Memorial Chapel is a registered historic landmark on the university's campus.

== Sources ==
- The New York Red Book compiled by Edgar L. Murlin (published by James B. Lyon, Albany NY, 1897; pg. 403 and 503f)
- Biographical sketches of the members of the Legislature in The Evening Journal Almanac] (1887)

Political offices
Preceded by Irving G. Vann	Mayor of Syracuse, New York; 1880–1881	Succeeded by John Demong
New York State Assembly
Preceded by Elbert O. Farrar	New York State Assembly; Onondaga County, 2nd District; 1884–1885	Succeeded by Alfred E. Stacey
New York State Senate
Preceded by Dennis McCarthy	New York State Senate; 25th District; 1886–1891	Succeeded by John A. Nichols
Government offices
Preceded by Jacob Sloat Fassett	Collector of the Port of New York; 1891–1893	Succeeded by James T. Kilbreth
Preceded by Louis F. Payn	Superintendent of Insurance; 1900–1906	Succeeded by Otto Kelsey
