= James Truesdell Kilbreth =

American attorney and public official

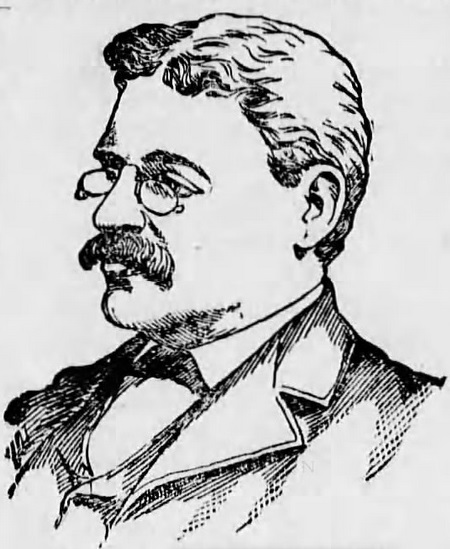
- From the Carlisle Daily Herald (Carlisle, PA), June 24, 1897

Collector of the Port of New York
- In office 1893–1897
- President: Grover Cleveland
- Preceded by: Francis Hendricks
- Succeeded by: George R. Bidwell

Personal details
- Born: March 12, 1841 Cincinnati, Ohio
- Died: June 23, 1897 (aged 56) Southhampton, New York
- Party: Democratic party
- Spouse: Eugenie Oudin (m. 1872)
- Education: Harvard University

James Truesdell Kilbreth (March 12, 1841 – June 23, 1897) was a lawyer, judge and political figure who served as Collector of the Port of New York, an important federal government post in pre-Sixteenth Amendment times, when customs duties and excise taxes were the primary sources of US federal government revenue.

== Early years and education ==
Kilbreth was born on the 12 March 1841 in Cincinnati, Ohio. He received a "rudimentary education in the public schools of that city" before attending Harvard University, graduating in 1862. Robert Todd Lincoln was a classmate. He later graduated from Harvard Law School before moving to New York to practice law.

== Legal career ==
Joining the firm of Evart, Southmayd and Choate, Kilbreth pursued a career in commercial law. He was a member of the Democratic party, and was prominent in the municipal reform movement following the scandals surrounding William M. Tweed. He was a member of the Irving Hall faction within the Democratic party in New York State, later joining the County Democracy, where he was a friend and consistent supporter of Grover Cleveland. He was well-connected socially, being a member of the Democratic, Harvard and Century Clubs, to the latter of which he had been proposed by Joseph Hodges Choate, a partner at Evart, Southmayd and Choate.

In 1873, Kilbreth was appointed to a ten-year term as a New York Police Justice by Mayor Havemeyer. However, this appointment was delayed by a political showdown between Mayor and Aldermen:

"The Board of Aldermen of that period refused to confirm Mr. Kilbreth's appointment and endeavored to make a dicker with the Mayor for an exchange of patronage".

After serving a full 10-year term, much of it on the bench of the Court of Special Sessions, Kilbreth was re-appointed to the Police Bench by Mayor Franklin Edson for a further ten-year term in 1882. By the time of the expiry of this second term the Mayor of New York was a Tammany Hall man, Hugh J. Grant, and Kilbreth's appointment was unsurprisingly not renewed.

== Collector of the Port of New York ==
In July 1893, in a surprise choice, Kilbreth was appointed as Collector of the Port of New York by his friend President Grover Cleveland. Prior to the adoption of the Sixteenth Amendment, customs duties (tariffs) and excise taxes were the primary sources of US federal government revenue, and as the largest port in the United States at the time (by 1910, the port was the busiest in the world), the Port of New York was therefore the single most important source of federal government income. These factors led the office of Collector of the Port of New York to be described as "the prize plum of Federal patronage not only in this State but perhaps in the country, outside of positions in the Cabinet." The New York Times reported that the choice of Kilbreth "threw the few politicians remaining on the city into a fever of excitement". The appointment was plainly a message from the President that Tammany Hall was no longer the influence it was:

"The fact is recalled that James T. Kilbreth made one of the best Police Justices New-York has ever had.[...]It goes without saying that the anti-machine Democrats of New-York State will be pleased with his selection."

A private act of the 58th United States Congress in March 1904, indemnified James T. Kilbreth (posthumously), and his successors as collectors of customs for the district and port of New York George R. Bidwell, and Nevada N. Stranahan for the losses through embezzlement by Byram W. Winters, a customs service clerk. Stranahan received a refund in the sum of $8,821.44 from the federal government, having personally settled the entire amount of the fraud.

== Personal life ==
In 1872, Kilbreth married Eugenie Oudin, a widow. Her brother was Felix Agnus, and one of her six sons by her first marriage was Eugene Oudin the tenor. James T. Kilbreth died of pneumonia at his summer house in Southampton, New York, on 23 June 1897, and was buried in Southampton Cemetery.

The obituary written for him by his Clubmates at the Century Association reads as follows:

"James T. Kilbreth, the Collector of the Port of New York when he died, and for many years a Justice of the Police Courts in the city, was an able, honorable official, and in every position he was called upon to fill gave evidence of his high sense of duty to the public, and was rewarded by the confidence of his fellow citizens without distinction of party to an unusual degree. He was a thoroughly educated and accomplished man, of the most genial nature, and warmly esteemed by a host of personal friends. He was most happy in his domestic relations, and has left a record of which his family can be justly proud."

Kilbreth's nephew, John William Kilbreth, was a career officer in the United States Army who attained the rank of brigadier general during World War I.

Government offices
Preceded by Francis Hendricks	Collector of the Port of New York; 1893-1897	Succeeded by George R. Bidwell
