= Committee of Fifteen =

New York City citizens' group

The Committee of Fifteen was a New York City citizens' group that lobbied for the elimination of prostitution and gambling. It was established in November 1900. The Committee hired investigators who visited city locations where prostitution and gambling was alleged to have taken place and filed reports on each site. The investigators visited bars, pool halls, dance halls, and tenements during the year 1901. The investigators posed as clients to determine the locations where prostitution took place.

The Committee disbanded in 1901 after evaluating the investigations and reporting to Governor Benjamin Barker Odell, Jr. It was succeeded by the Committee of Fourteen. In 1902 the Committee of Fifteen's report, The Social Evil With Special Reference to Conditions Existing in the City of New York was released.

== Members in 1901 ==
- William H. Baldwin, Jr. (Chairman)
- Edwin R. A. Seligman (Secretary)
- Charles Stewart Smith
- Joel B. Erhardt
- John Stewart Kennedy
- Felix Adler
- George Haven Putnam
- Charles Sprague Smith
- George Foster Peabody
- Jacob H. Schiff
- Andrew J. Smith
- Austen G. Fox
- William J. O'Brien
- Alexander E. Orr
- John Harsen Rhoades
