= Norman Penny =

American businessman and politician (c. 1905 – 1962)

Norman F. Penny

Member of the New York State Assembly from the 2nd district
- In office 1938–1942
- Preceded by: Leonard Hall
- Succeeded by: William S. Hults Jr.

Personal details
- Born: Ca. 1905 Roslyn, New York
- Died: February 13, 1962 (aged 57) Flower Hill, New York
- Party: Republican
- Children: 3
- Education: Brown University

Military service
- Branch/service: United States Air Force
- Rank: Major

Norman F. Penny (ca. 1905 – February 13, 1962) was an American banker, insurance broker, investor, and politician from New York.

== Biography ==
Penny was born in Roslyn, New York ca. 1905. He attended Brown University for college. In 1938, Penny was elected to the New York State Assembly, representing the 2nd Assembly district as a Republican, succeeding Leonard Hall. He served in this capacity between 1938 and 1942. During his time in the New York State Assembly, he co-sponsored New York's pari-mutuel law. Penny also led efforts to improve grade crossing safety in Nassau County and throughout the state through a bill mandating that all grade crossings in Nassau County be equipped with lights and bells, and pushed for infrastructure improvements for the Long Island Rail Road – including upgrades to grade crossings to improve safety and an unsuccessful push to electrify the Oyster Bay Branch.

In 1946, following his military service, Penny declined to accept the GOP nomination for New York State Assemblyman, opting not to run for the position which he had previously held; at the time, he resided at 91 Rocky Wood Road in the Strathmore section of Manhasset. Penny was succeeded in the New York State Assembly by William S. Hults Jr., who resided at the time at 14 Lowell Road in the New Salem section of Port Washington.

Penny also served as the Town of North Hempstead's Republican leader for many years, as well as remaining a prominent figure in Nassau County politics.

=== Military service ===
During World War II, he served in the United States Air Force and was stationed at Lincoln Air Force Base in Lincoln, Nebraska, earning the ranking of Major in 1944; he served as Base Intelligence Officer and as Public Relations Officer.

== Death ==
Penny died on February 13, 1962, in his sleep from a heart attack at his home on Knolls Lane in Flower Hill. He was 57 years old. His funeral was held at Fairchild & Sons in Manhasset.

== Personal life ==
Penny was married to his wife, and the couple had 3 children.

Penny was involved with the Cerebral Palsy Foundation of Nassau County, serving as the chair of the 1952 fund drive.

New York State Assembly
Preceded by Leonard Hall	Nassau County, 2nd District; 1938–1942	Succeeded by William S. Hults Jr.
