= John F. Madden =

U.S. Army brigadier general (1870–1946)

John Fitz Madden
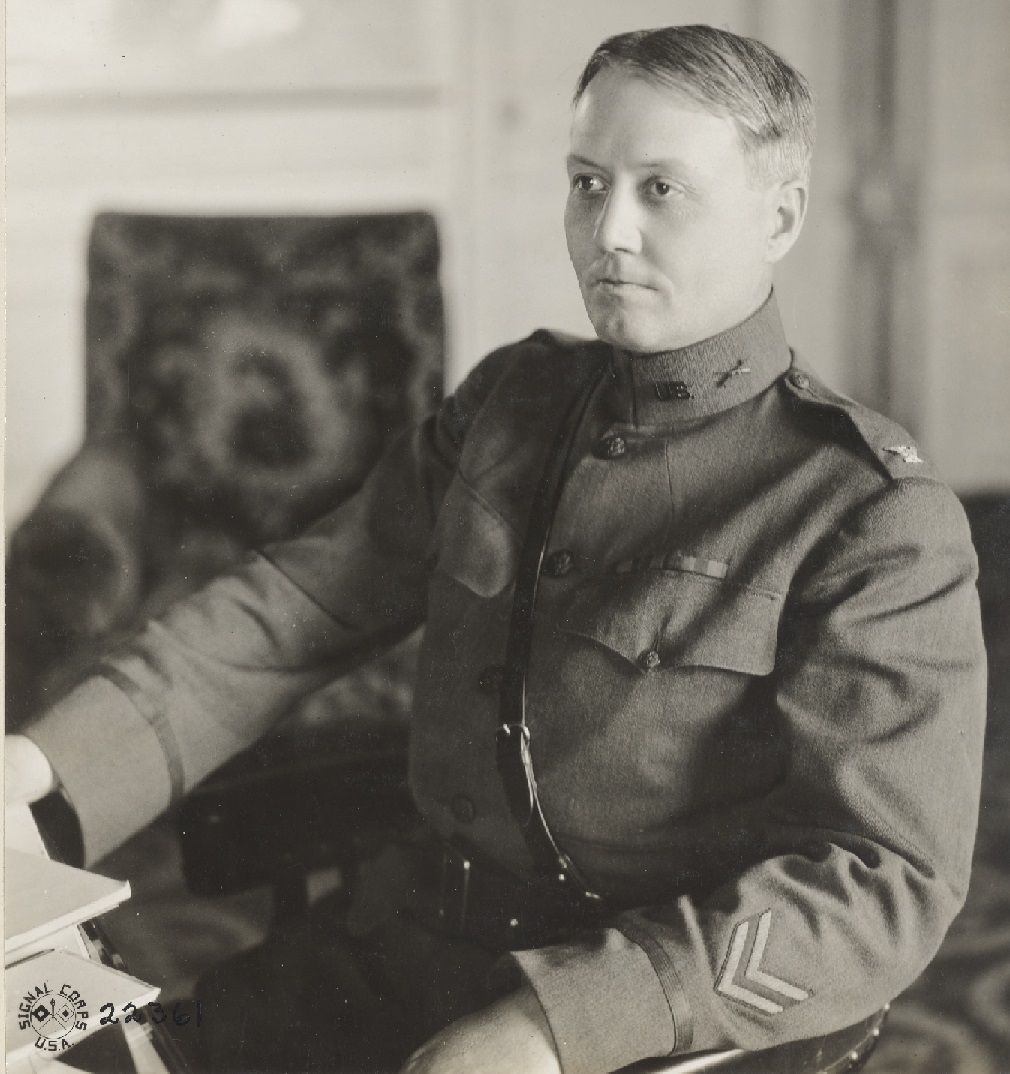
- Madden as a colonel and assistant quartermaster general of the American Expeditionary Forces, May 1918.
- Born: March 30, 1870; Sacramento, California, U.S.
- Died: May 16, 1946 (aged 76); Staten Island, New York
- Burial place: Sacramento Historic City Cemetery, Sacramento, California
- Alma mater: University of California, Berkeley (attended)
- Spouse: Edith May Partello (m. 1898–1905, div.)
- Children: 2
- Military career
- Service: California National Guard; United States Army
- Service years: 1890–1891 (National Guard); 1891–1934 (Army)
- Rank: Corporal (National Guard); Brigadier General (Army)
- Service number: 0–366
- Unit: U.S. Army Infantry Branch
- Commands: Company G, 5th Infantry Regiment; Company K, 29th Infantry Regiment; Provisional Battalion, 29th Infantry Regiment; 3rd Battalion, 29th Infantry Regiment; 29th Infantry Regiment Band; 2nd Battalion, 29th Infantry Regiment; Fort Niagara, New York; Advance Section, Services of Supply, American Expeditionary Forces; 19th Infantry Regiment; 26th Infantry Regiment; San Francisco General Depot; 21st Infantry Brigade
- Wars: Garza Revolution; Spanish–American War; United States Military Government in Cuba; Philippine–American War; Pancho Villa Expedition; World War I
- Awards: Legion of Honor (Officer) (France)
- Other work: Deputy Administrator, Lumber and Timber, National Recovery Administration

John Fitz Madden (March 30, 1870 – May 19, 1946) was a career officer in the United States Army. A veteran of the U.S. response to the Garza Revolution, Spanish–American War, United States Military Government in Cuba, Philippine–American War, Pancho Villa Expedition, and World War I, he attained the rank of brigadier general and was a recipient of the French Legion of Honor (Officer) for his First World War service. Madden served in both high level staff positions, including chief quartermaster of the Pancho Villa Expedition, and important commands, including the 26th Infantry Regiment and the Hawaiian Division's 21st Infantry Brigade.

A native of Sacramento, California, Madden attended the Saint Matthew's Hall military boarding school, the Lincoln School in San Francisco, and San Francisco's Boys' High School. During his high school years, Madden belonged to the Cadet Company, a unit of students that performed duty with the 1st Regiment of the California National Guard, and he attained the rank of first lieutenant. After his 1890 graduation, Madden joined the 1st Regiment's Company C, in which he attained the rank of corporal. From 1890 to 1891, he attended the University of California, Berkeley.

In 1891, Madden's application for a commission in the United States Army was approved and he was appointed a second lieutenant of Infantry. Initially assigned to the 5th Infantry Regiment, Madden advanced through the ranks, primarily as a member of the 29th Infantry Regiment and in temporary Quartermaster assignments. He took part in the Spanish–American War, United States Military Government in Cuba, and Philippine–American War. During the Pancho Villa Expedition, Madden served as chief quartermaster. At the start of World War I, he served as commander of the Advance Section for the Services of Supply, American Expeditionary Forces, and he was later assigned as assistant to the chief quartermaster of the American Expeditionary Forces with headquarters in Paris. During the war he received promotion to temporary brigadier general. After the war, he received the Legion of Honor (Officer) from France.

Madden's post-war assignments included command of the 19th Infantry Regiment, 26th Infantry Regiment and 21st Infantry Brigade. He retired in 1934 upon reaching the mandatory retirement age of 64, and was a resident of the Marlborough Hotel in East Orange, New Jersey. He died in Staten Island, New York on May 19, 1946. Madden was buried at Sacramento Historic City Cemetery in Sacramento.

== Early life ==
John Fitz Madden was born in Sacramento, California, on March 30, 1870, the son of Jerome and Margaret (Evans) Madden. He was raised in San Francisco, and was educated at San Mateo's Saint Matthew's Hall military boarding school, the Lincoln School in San Francisco, and San Francisco's Boys' High School, from which he graduated in 1890. While in high school, Madden was active in the Cadet Company, a unit of students commanded by William Renwick Smedberg Jr. with the rank of captain, in which Madden served as first lieutenant. The Cadet Company performed duty with the 1st Regiment of the California National Guard, which facilitated Madden's post-high school entry into the National Guard.

After graduating from high school, Madden attended the University of California, Berkeley from 1890 to 1891, where he took the literary course at the College of Letters and Science. While attending college, Madden served in the California National Guard's Company C, 1st Infantry Regiment, in which he attained the rank of corporal. In 1891, he applied for a commission in the United States Army. He performed successfully on the examination, (Note: 20 applicants sat for the examination. 10 passed, including Madden, who finished seventh.) and received his commission as a second lieutenant of Infantry. After he received his commission, his National Guard company honored him by electing him a life member.

== Start of career ==
In October 1891, Madden was assigned to the 5th Infantry Regiment at Fort Sam Houston, Texas. In January 1892, Madden voluntarily accompanied Troop K, 3rd Cavalry, commanded by George King Hunter, during the U.S. response to crossings of the Mexico–United States border by Mexican participants in the Garza Revolution. In March 1894, Madden was reassigned to duty at St. Francis Barracks, Florida.

In June 1895, Madden was selected to attend the two-year course at the Fort Leavenworth, Kansas Infantry and Cavalry School, and he graduated in June 1897. He was promoted to first lieutenant in July 1898. During the Spanish–American War, 5th Infantry detachments manned coastal defenses along the Gulf of Mexico from Galveston, Texas, to Dry Tortugas, Florida, and Madden commanded the regiment's Company G during its duty in Tampa, Florida. Later in 1898, Madden took part in action at Santa Clara and Puerto Principe in Cuba. In October 1898, he was assigned to temporary duty as assistant quartermaster and commissary of subsistence aboard USAT McClellan, an army transport ship that moved supplies and soldiers between Cuba and the United States during the United States Military Government in Cuba.

In March 1901, Madden was promoted to captain and assigned as quartermaster officer of the 29th Infantry Regiment when the regiment served in the Philippines during the Philippine–American War. Upon his return to the United States, Madden was posted to Fort Sheridan, Illinois. In February 1902, he was a founder of the Order of Santa Clara, an organizations of veterans who took part in Spanish–American War action in Santa Clara and Puerto Principe. By May 1903, he was again serving in the Philippines.

== Continued career ==
After returning to the United States in the summer of 1904, Madden was posted to Fort Douglas, Utah as adjutant of the 29th Infantry. In the summer of 1905, he commanded a provisional battalion of the 29th Infantry (Companies F and L) when it performed temporary duty in Strawberry, Utah, during the opening of the Uintah and Ouray Indian Reservation. After the 1906 San Francisco earthquake, Madden was detailed to temporary duty in San Francisco, first as executive secretary to Lieutenant Colonel Lea Febiger, the head of Consolidated Relief Stations, then as adjutant to Joseph Alfred Gaston, the commander of permanent relief camps that provided lodging to more than 20,000 city residents.

After his temporary duty in San Francisco, Madden returned to Fort Douglas, where in April 1907 he was assigned to command 3rd Battalion, 29th Infantry. In August 1907, Madden returned to the Philippines with the 29th Infantry, and he served there until returning to the United States in August 1909. After his return from the Philippines, Madden was posted to Fort Jay on Governors Island, New York as the 29th Infantry's adjutant.

In late 1911, Madden was assigned as defense counsel during the Governors Island court-martial of Major Frank T. Woodbury, a medical officer who was charged with failing to properly treat a soldier in his care after Second Lieutenant Lloyd Fredendall accused him of negligence. Woodbury was convicted on two of four charges, and sentenced to a written reprimand, the most lenient punishment available to the judges.

In March 1912, Madden was assigned as judge advocate (prosecutor) for the court-martial of Captain John William Kilbreth, who was accused of failure to pay three minor debts. totaling $22.65 (about $670 in 2022). In addition, he was charged with neglect of duty while serving as artillery inspector and instructor for the National Guards of New York and New Jersey, allegedly for failing to visit units at remote locations beyond the New York City area. Kilbreth was found guilty of disobeying orders for failing to respond to the Adjutant General of the United States Army's inquiries about the debts, and reduced several places on the captain's seniority list, but was not otherwise punished.

In August 1912, Madden was part of a 29th Infantry contingent that marched from Mount Gretna, Pennsylvania, to Elmira Town, New York and established a training camp as part of the activities associated with the dedication of an American Revolutionary War-related monument at Newtown Battlefield State Park. As regimental adjutant, one of Madden's additional duties was commanding the 29th Infantry Band. After the band completed its concerts in Elmira, Madden led it to Rochester, New York, where it participated in mid-September ceremonies that commemorated the city's founders by dedicating a plaque in honor of John Mastick, one of Rochester's first settlers.

== Later career ==
In March 1914, Madden was promoted to major and assigned to command 2nd Battalion, 29th Infantry and the post at Fort Niagara, New York. In August 1914, Madden was detailed to the Quartermaster Corps and posted to Fort Snelling, Minnesota, where he was assigned to supervise construction projects. In August 1915, Madden was posted to Fort Sam Houston, Texas and assigned to duty as post quartermaster, quartermaster of the post's supply depot, and supervisor of construction projects as the fort was expanded in anticipation of U.S. entry into World War I. In October 1915, Madden was reassigned as assistant to the chief quartermaster of the army's Southern Department, which was headquartered at Fort Sam Houston.

In March 1916, John J. Pershing was assigned to command U.S. forces on the Mexico–United States border during the Pancho Villa Expedition and Madden was assigned to his staff as quartermaster. In January 1917, Madden was serving as chief of transportation on the staff of Major General Frederick Funston during Funston's command of the Southern Department, and carried out inspection tours of units throughout Arizona, New Mexico, and western Texas.

In July 1917, Madden was assigned to World War I quartermaster duties on the staff of the United States Department of War. In August 1917, Madden was promoted to temporary lieutenant colonel, to date from May 15. Madden arrived in France soon after his promotion, and served first as quartermaster of the 1st Division, then as commander of Advance Section, Services of Supply, American Expeditionary Forces, followed by assignment as assistant to the chief quartermaster of the American Expeditionary Forces with headquarters in Paris. Madden was the army's recognized expert on motorized transportation and production of canned goods, which were vital to the war effort, and he was promoted to temporary colonel in January 1918, to date from August 5, 1917. In October 1918, Madden was promoted to temporary brigadier general. He returned to the United States in February 1919 and was reduced to his permanent rank of lieutenant colonel in March.

In April 1919, Madden was assigned to quartermaster duty in the office of the zone supply officer at the Presidio of San Francisco. In November 1919, he was assigned to command the 19th Infantry Regiment at Camp Harry J. Jones, Arizona. He was promoted to permanent colonel in April 1920 and in August 1920, he began attendance at the United States Army War College. After graduating in 1921, he was assigned as a student at the United States Army Command and General Staff College, which he completed in 1922. He then completed the course at the Naval War College, after which he attended the Institute of Politics at Williams College. In 1925, Madden was assigned to the staff of the Fifth Corps Area at Fort Hayes, Ohio.

In September 1927, Madden was assigned to command the 26th Infantry Regiment and the post at Plattsburgh Barracks, New York. In July 1930, he was assigned to Fort Mason, California as commandant of the army's San Francisco General Depot. In March 1931, Madden was promoted to brigadier general, and in April he was assigned to command the 21st Infantry Brigade at Schofield Barracks, Hawaii. Madden reached the mandatory retirement age of 64 in March 1934, and he retired effective March 31.

== Retirement and death ==
After his retirement from the army, in July 1934 Madden was appointed deputy administrator of five National Recovery Administration (NRA) agencies that regulated aspects of the lumber and timber industries. He served until the NRA was dissolved in December 1935.

In retirement, he was a member of The Lambs, a social club for artists, and was a resident of the Marlborough Hotel in East Orange, New Jersey. Madden died in Staten Island, New York on May 19, 1946. He was buried at Sacramento Historic City Cemetery in Sacramento.

== Awards ==
For his World War I service, Madden was a recipient of the French Legion of Honor (Officer). As a result of his service in the Philippines, Madden was a member of the Military Order of the Carabao. Madden's service in several overseas conflicts was recognized with numerous campaign medals, to include: Spanish Campaign, Cuban Occupation, Philippine Campaign, Mexican Service, and World War I Victory.

== Family ==
In April 1898, Madden married Edith May Partello, the daughter of Joseph M. T. Partello, an officer in the 5th Infantry. They were the parents of two sons, Jerome and John. In 1903, Madden requested a divorce and alleged that his wife had an affair with another army officer while he was in the Philippines. She denied the allegations, but the divorce was granted in 1905. Edith Partello later married army officer Victor A. B. Davidson. They became the parents of a son, Emmett in 1907 and a daughter, Edna in early October 1908, and Edith died later that month. Madden never remarried.

Jerome P. Madden was born in early 1899 and died about six months later. John Fitzpatrick Madden (1900–1979) was raised by his paternal grandparents and an aunt after his parents divorced. He was a career officer in the United States Navy and attained the rank of captain.
