= Raines law =

New York State liquor tax law of 1896

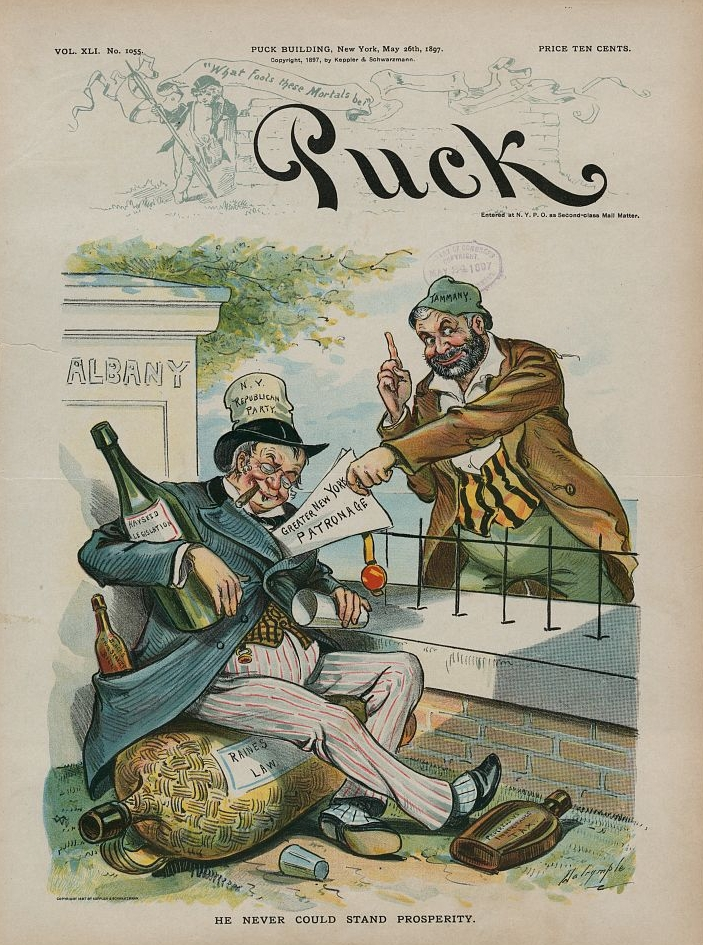
He never could stand prosperity, an illustration by Louis Dalrymple satirizing the Raines law, 1897

The New York State liquor tax law of 1896, also known as the Raines law, was authored by the New York State Senator John Raines and adopted in the New York State Legislature on March 23, 1896. Among other provisions, the Raines law increased the cost of liquor licenses, raised the drinking age from sixteen to eighteen, and prohibited the sale of alcoholic beverages on Sundays except in hotels, as well as in lodging houses with at least 10 rooms that served drinks with complimentary meals. It took effect on April 1, 1896, was amended in 1917 and repealed in 1923.

Most men worked a six-day week, and Sunday was the only free day for recreation, so the new law was not very popular. Answering the demand, saloon owners quickly found a loophole by adding small slightly furnished rooms, complimentary food and applying for a hotel license since state statutes seemingly allowed that any business was considered a hotel if it had 10 rooms for lodging and served at least sandwiches with its liquor.

The widespread breaking of the law benefited the Tammany Hall machine, since saloon owners had to pay large kickbacks to the police in order to stay open.

== Raines sandwiches ==
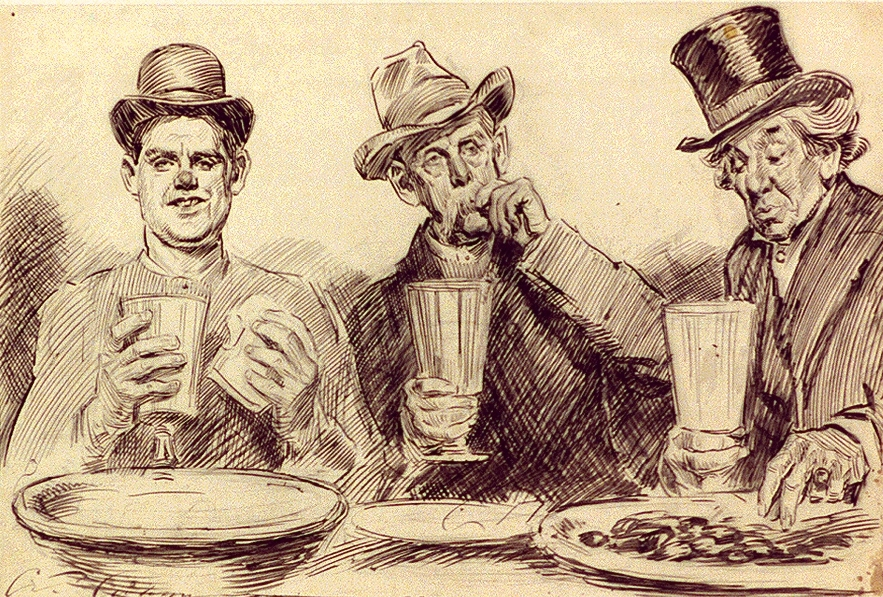
Free lunch, by Charles Dana Gibson.

The meal requirement was met by the cheapest sandwich available, sometimes reused across tables, or sandwiches made of rubber.

Jacob Riis wrote in 1902 of saloon keepers who mocked the law by setting out "brick sandwiches" – two pieces of bread with a brick in between – thus fulfilling the legal requirement of serving food. He also wrote of an altercation in a saloon where a customer attempted to eat a sandwich that the bartender had served just for show; "the police restored the sandwich to the bartender and made no arrests."

== Raines law hotels ==
Scores of "Raines law hotels", often located directly above saloons, opened. A year later, there were 1,500 of them in New York; in Brooklyn the number of registered hotels went from 13 to 800 after six months.

As a contemporary source put it, "This offered a premium on the transformation of saloons into hotels with bedrooms and led to unlooked-for evils," an increase in prostitution, as the rooms in many "Raines law hotels" were used mostly by prostitutes and unmarried couples. In some cases these rooms may not even have been available at all; in a 1917 novel, Susan Lenox: Her Fall And Rise, the protagonist sees "a Raines Law hotel with awnings, indicating that it was not merely a blind to give a saloon a hotel license but was actually open for business."

To fight the Raines law hotels the so-called Committee of Fourteen was organized in 1905.

== Consequences ==
It was nominally a liquor tax, but its intention was to curb the consumption of alcohol by imposing stricter regulations which it failed to do.

By 1911, the Committee had successfully lobbied for the shutdown of many of the Raines law hotels.

== In popular culture ==
A shabby, Raines law hotel-type New York City saloon and rooming house serves as the 1912 setting of the classic play The Iceman Cometh, by Eugene O'Neill.

A bar named the Raines Law Room, at the Williams Hotel in New York City, is named in commemoration of the impact of the law.

== See also ==
- Blue law
- Free lunch
