= Moderation League of New York =

American anti-prohibition organization

The Moderation League of New York was an American organization founded in 1923 in opposition to prohibition.

== History ==
The Moderation League was founded in 1923 by Austen George Fox and "six other wealthy residents of New York City" to change the Volstead Act's legal definition of the "intoxicating liquors" prohibited by the Eighteenth Amendment to the United States Constitution establishing prohibition. This seemed to its members to be an achievable goal, whereas the repeal of prohibition seemed at that point an impossible achievement. The League worked closely with the American Federation of Labor and the Constitutional Liberty League of Massachusetts.

In 1926, the League conducted a survey of 602 police departments that found that Prohibition law violations had dramatically risen over time, and that the "increase in arrests was up more in those states that were already dry before National Prohibition".

While the Moderation League was unsuccessful in its battle over the alcohol content, it helped win the repeal of National Prohibition with the Twenty-first Amendment to the United States Constitution.

=== Directors ===
Besides Fox (a close ally of Elihu Root), the others involved were E. N. Brown, James A. Burden (father of James A. Burden Jr.), John G. Agar, James Speyer and Martin Vogel of New York and Thomas D. Stokes of Long Beach.
