= Committee of Fourteen =

American prohibition pressure group

The Committee of Fourteen was founded on January 16, 1905, by members of the New York Anti-Saloon League as an association dedicated to the abolition of Raines law hotels.

== History ==
Blue laws banned saloons from selling alcoholic beverages on Sundays, but the Raines law of 1896 permitted hotels to do so. When saloon keepers responded by creating bedrooms, which were then used for prostitution, the Committee demanded inspections of premises to distinguish legitimate hotels from saloons. On May 1, 1905, a law was passed and required a city inspection to occur before a license was issued. By 1911, most Raines law hotels had closed, but the Committee remained active until it ran out of money in 1932, when it was disbanded.

== Members of the Committee ==
- William Henry Baldwin, Jr.
- Raymond B. Fosdick
- Walter G. Hooke
- Alice Davis Menken
- James Pedersen
- John P. Peters
- George Haven Putnam
- Mary Kingsbury Simkhovitch
- Francis Louis Slade
- Percy S. Straus
- Lawrence Veiller
- Frederick H. Whitin
- George E. Worthington

== See also ==
- Committee of Fifteen
- Black and tan clubs

== Notes ==
- Research Committee of the Committee of Fourteen. (1910). The social evil in New York city : a study of law enforcement
- Research Committee of the Committee of Fourteen. (1912, 1914, 1916, 1917, 1919–1924). Annual Report
- Research Committee of the Committee of Fourteen. (1914-1915). Annual Report
