= Collector of the Port of New York =

Port of New York federal appointment

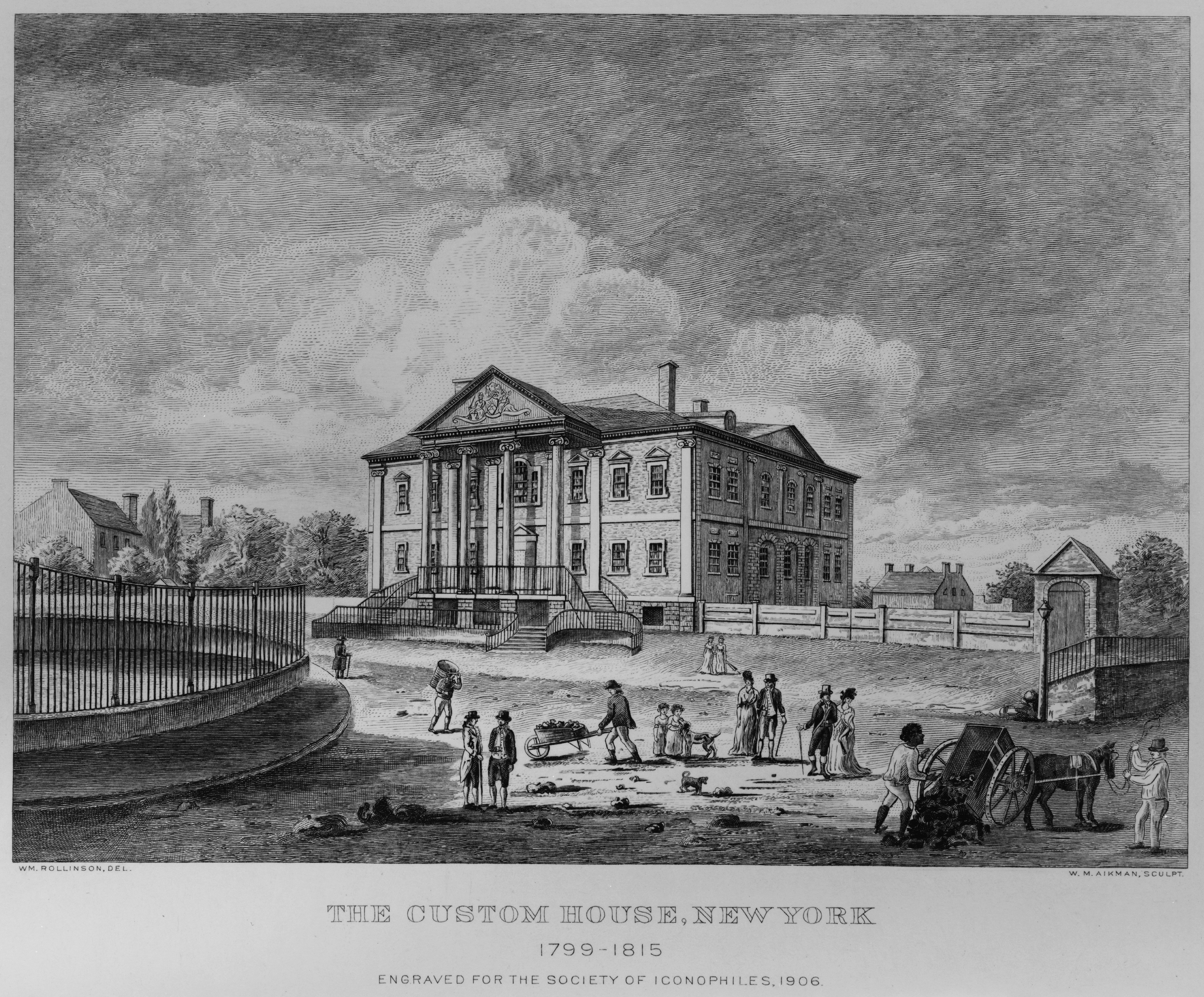

U.S. federal government appointment overview
- Formed: 1789
- Dissolved: 1966
- Type: Collector of import duties on foreign goods
- Jurisdiction: Port of New York
- Headquarters: United States Custom House, New York City
- Parent department: United States Department of the Treasury

The Collector of Customs at the Port of New York, most often referred to as Collector of the Port of New York, was a federal officer who was in charge of the collection of import duties on foreign goods that entered the United States by ship at the Port of New York.

In addition to its control of import duties, the office controlled and distributed a large number of lucrative federal jobs, making it among the most important political patronage positions in the United States government. Disputes over control of the office, particularly between the President and United States Senators from New York, who traditionally advised on political appointments within the state, were a key aspect of the national debate over civil service reform in the nineteenth century.

The best-known individual to hold the position was Chester A. Arthur, who served as collector from 1871 to 1878 and who later served as the 21st president of the United States.

== History ==
The first Collector, John Lamb, was appointed by George Washington in 1789. He had previously served as Collector of Customs for the State of New York from 1784.

The office was described as "the prize plum of Federal patronage not only in this State but perhaps in the country, outside of positions in the Cabinet." Customs collections at US ports were overseen by three political appointees—the Collector, Surveyor, and Naval Officer. (Note: The Naval Officer was a political appointee, not a military one. The position was called "naval" because the incumbent was expected to board and inspect ships to aid the Surveyor and Collector in estimating the duties owed.) Because they were originally paid based on a percentage system that factored in both customs collected and fines levied for those who attempted to evade payment, these appointments were very lucrative, especially those at the Port of New York, by far America's busiest port. New York's Collector was the highest paid official of the federal government; as Collector from 1871 to 1878, Chester A. Arthur's compensation exceeded the modern equivalent of $1 million annually. The custom house staffs, especially at New York's Custom House were also political appointees, and were expected to contribute a portion of their salaries to the party to which they owed their appointments.

Disputes over patronage at the Port of New York led to an ongoing feud from the 1860s to the 1880s between the party faction led by Roscoe Conkling and reformers who counted Rutherford B. Hayes and James A. Garfield among their number. The attempts at reform that began in the 1870s led to the political appointees at each port being placed on salaries rather than the percentage system. The annual salary in 1920 was $12,000 (about $153,000 in 2019) plus about $8,000 in fees (about $102,000 in 2019).

The position was abolished in 1966 when the structure of the United States Customs Service was changed. The last Collector, Joseph P. Kelly, was kept on temporarily as a consultant.

== List of collectors ==
Portrait	No.	Collector	Nominated by	Start date	End date	Comments
	1	John Lamb	George Washington	1789	1797	
	2	Joshua Sands	John Adams	1797	1801	Confirmed May 19, 1797
	3	David Gelston	Thomas Jefferson	1801	1820	
	4	Jonathan Thompson	James Monroe	1820	1829	
	5	Samuel Swartwout	Andrew Jackson	1829	1838	Confirmed March 29, 1830.
	6	Jesse Hoyt	Martin Van Buren	1838	1841	
	7	John J. Morgan	Martin Van Buren	1841	1841	
	8	Edward Curtis	William Henry Harrison	1841	1844	
	N/A	Charles G. Ferris	John Tyler	-	-	Rejected by the U.S. Senate
	9	Cornelius P. Van Ness	John Tyler	1844	1845	
	10	Cornelius Van Wyck Lawrence	James K. Polk	1845	1849	
	11	Hugh Maxwell	Zachary Taylor	1849	1853	
	N/A	Daniel S. Dickinson	Franklin Pierce	-	-	Declined nomination
	12	Greene C. Bronson	Franklin Pierce	1853	1853	
	13	Heman J. Redfield	Franklin Pierce	1853	1857	Resigned July 1, 1857
	14	Augustus Schell	James Buchanan	1857	1861	
	15	Hiram Barney	Abraham Lincoln	1861	1864	Resigned
	16	Simeon Draper	Abraham Lincoln	1864	1865	
	17	Preston King	Andrew Johnson	1865	1865	Committed suicide
	N/A	Charles P. Clinch	N/A	1865	1866	Acting
	18	Henry A. Smythe	Andrew Johnson	1866	1869	
	19	Moses H. Grinnell	Ulysses S. Grant	1869	1870	
	20	Thomas Murphy	Ulysses S. Grant	1870	1871	
	21	Chester A. Arthur	Ulysses S. Grant	1871	1878	
	N/A	Theodore Roosevelt Sr.	Rutherford B. Hayes	-	-	Rejected by U.S. Senate
	22	Edwin Atkins Merritt	Rutherford B. Hayes	1878	1881	
	23	William H. Robertson	James A. Garfield	1881	1885	Nominated March 24, 1881
	24	Edward L. Hedden	Grover Cleveland	1885	1886	
	25	Daniel Magone	Grover Cleveland	1886	1889	
	26	Joel Erhardt	Benjamin Harrison	1889	1891	
	27	Jacob Sloat Fassett	Benjamin Harrison	1891	1891	
	28	Francis Hendricks	Benjamin Harrison	1891	1893	
	29	James Truesdell Kilbreth	Grover Cleveland	1893	1897	Died in office (Note: A private act of the 58th United States Congress in March 1904, indemnified James T. Kilbreth (posthumously), George R. Bidwell, and Nevada N. Stranahan as collectors of customs for the district and port of New York for the losses through embezzlement by Byram W. Winters, a customs service clerk. Stranahan received a refund in the sum of $8,821.44 from the federal government, having personally settled the entire amount of the fraud.)
	30	George R. Bidwell	William McKinley	1897	1902	
	31	Nevada Stranahan	Theodore Roosevelt	1902	1907	Resigned due to ill health
	N/A	Henry C. Stuart	N/A	1907	1907	Acting
	32	Edward S. Fowler	Theodore Roosevelt	1907	1909	
	33	William Loeb Jr.	William Howard Taft	1909	1913	
	34	John Purroy Mitchel	Woodrow Wilson	1913	1913	Elected Mayor of New York City
	35	Dudley Field Malone	Woodrow Wilson	1913	1917	
	36	Byron Rufus Newton	Woodrow Wilson	1917	1921	
	37	George W. Aldridge	Warren G. Harding	1921	1922	Died in office
	N/A	Henry C. Stuart	N/A	1922	1923	Acting
	38	Philip Elting	Calvin Coolidge	1923	1933	
	39	Harry M. Durning	Franklin D. Roosevelt	1933	1953	(Note: Harry M. Durning was the defendant in the case of Dioguardi v. Durning, 139 F.2d 774 (2d Cir. 1944), which is frequently used in Civil Procedure courses as a starting point to teach pleadings under the modern approach of Federal Rules of Civil Procedure.)
	40	Robert Wharton Dill	Dwight D. Eisenhower	1953	1961	
	41	Joseph P. Kelly	John F. Kennedy	1961	1966	

== See also ==
- Port Authority of New York & New Jersey
- Roscoe Conkling
