= List of chairs of the Republican National Committee =

List of U.S. political party chairs

Chair of the Republican National Committee

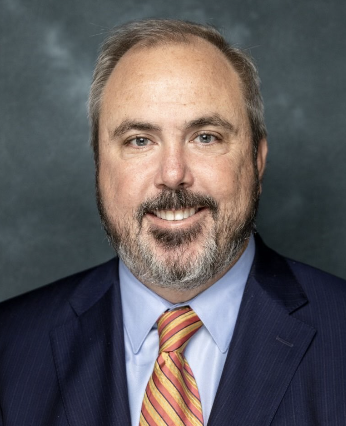
- Incumbent; Joe Gruters since August 22, 2025
- Appointer: Republican National Committee
- Term length: 4 years, renewable
- Inaugural holder: Edwin D. Morgan
- Formation: 1856 (169 years ago)
- Website: Official website

The chair of the Republican National Committee is the party chair of the Republican Party.

The chair manages the day-to-day affairs and operations of the Republican National Committee (RNC), prepares and conducts the quadrennial Republican National Convention, promotes the Republican "party brand" and political platform, as well as assists in party fundraising and election strategy.

The current officeholder is Florida state Senator Joe Gruters, who took office on August 22, 2025.

== Chairs of the Republican National Committee ==
Denotes acting capacity.

List of Republican National Committee chairs
Name		Start	End	State
	Edwin Morgan	1856	1864	New York
	Henry Raymond	1864	September 3, 1866	New York
	Marcus Ward	September 3, 1866	May 21, 1868	New Jersey
	William Claflin	May 21, 1868	1872	Massachusetts
	Edwin Morgan	1872	June 1876	New York
	Zachariah Chandler	June 1876	November 1, 1879	Michigan
	Donald Cameron	November 1, 1879	December 17, 1879	Pennsylvania
	Donald Cameron	December 17, 1879	July 2, 1880	Pennsylvania
	Marshall Jewell	July 2, 1880	February 10, 1883	Connecticut
	Dwight Sabin	February 10, 1883	June 6, 1884	Minnesota
	Benjamin Jones	June 6, 1884	July 12, 1888	New Jersey
	Matthew Quay	July 12, 1888	July 19, 1891	Pennsylvania
	James Clarkson	July 19, 1891	June 29, 1892	Iowa
	William Campbell	June 29, 1892	July 8, 1892	Illinois
	Thomas Carter	July 8, 1892	June 18, 1896	Montana
	Mark Hanna	June 18, 1896	February 15, 1904	Ohio
	Henry Payne; Acting	February 15, 1904	June 23, 1904	Wisconsin
	George Cortelyou	June 23, 1904	January 7, 1907	New York
	Harry New	January 7, 1907	March 4, 1907	Indiana
	Harry New	March 4, 1907	July 8, 1908	Indiana
	Frank Hitchcock	July 8, 1908	March 5, 1909	Ohio
	John Hill	March 5, 1909	December 12, 1911	Maine
	John Hill	December 12, 1911	March 16, 1912	Maine
	Victor Rosewater	March 16, 1912	July 18, 1912	Nebraska
	Charles Hilles	July 18, 1912	June 27, 1916	New York
	William Willcox	June 27, 1916	February 13, 1918	New York
	Will Hays	February 13, 1918	June 8, 1921	Indiana
	John Adams	June 8, 1921	May 2, 1924	Iowa
	William Butler	May 2, 1924	July 24, 1928	Massachusetts
	Hubert Work	July 24, 1928	September 9, 1929	Colorado
	Claudius Huston	September 9, 1929	August 7, 1930	Tennessee
	Simeon Fess	August 7, 1930	June 17, 1932	Ohio
	Everett Sanders	June 17, 1932	June 5, 1934	Indiana
	Henry Fletcher	June 5, 1934	June 22, 1936	Pennsylvania
	John Hamilton	June 22, 1936	July 8, 1940	Kansas
	Joseph Martin	July 8, 1940	December 7, 1942	Massachusetts
	Harrison Spangler	December 7, 1942	June 30, 1944	Iowa
	Herbert Brownell	June 30, 1944	April 1, 1946	New York
	Carroll Reece	April 1, 1946	June 27, 1948	Tennessee
	Hugh Scott	June 27, 1948	August 5, 1949	Pennsylvania
	Guy Gabrielson	August 5, 1949	July 12, 1952	New Jersey
	Arthur Summerfield	July 12, 1952	January 17, 1953	Michigan
	Wesley Roberts	January 17, 1953	March 27, 1953	Kansas
	Leonard Hall	April 10, 1953	February 1, 1957	New York
	Meade Alcorn	February 1, 1957	July 1, 1959	Connecticut
	Thruston Morton	July 1, 1959	June 2, 1961	Kentucky
	William Miller	June 2, 1961	June 15, 1964	New York
	Dean Burch	July 16, 1964	April 1, 1965	Arizona
	Ray Bliss	April 1, 1965	April 14, 1969	Ohio
	Rogers Morton	April 14, 1969	January 15, 1971	Maryland
	Bob Dole	January 15, 1971	January 19, 1973	Kansas
	George H. W. Bush	January 19, 1973	September 16, 1974	Texas
	Mary Smith	September 16, 1974	January 15, 1977	Iowa
	Bill Brock	January 15, 1977	January 20, 1981	Tennessee
	Dick Richards	January 20, 1981	January 28, 1983	Utah
	Paul Laxalt; General Chair	January 28, 1983	January 23, 1987	Nevada
	Frank Fahrenkopf; National Chair	January 28, 1983	January 23, 1987	Nevada
	Frank Fahrenkopf; National Chair	January 23, 1987	January 18, 1989	Nevada
	Lee Atwater	January 18, 1989	January 25, 1991	South Carolina
	Clay Yeutter	January 25, 1991	February 1, 1992	Nebraska
	Richard Bond	February 1, 1992	January 29, 1993	Missouri
	Haley Barbour	January 29, 1993	January 17, 1997	Mississippi
	Jim Nicholson	January 17, 1997	January 18, 2001	Colorado
	Jim Gilmore	January 18, 2001	December 5, 2001	Virginia
	Marc Racicot	December 5, 2001	July 25, 2003	Montana
	Ed Gillespie	July 25, 2003	January 20, 2005	Virginia
	Ken Mehlman	January 20, 2005	January 19, 2007	District of Columbia
	Mel Martínez; General Chair	January 19, 2007	October 19, 2007	Florida
	Mike Duncan; National Chair	January 19, 2007	January 30, 2009	Kentucky
	Michael Steele	January 30, 2009	January 14, 2011	Maryland
	Reince Priebus	January 14, 2011	January 19, 2017	Wisconsin
	Ronna Romney McDaniel	January 19, 2017	March 8, 2024	Michigan
co-chair	Lara Trump	March 8, 2024	December 9, 2024	North Carolina
	Michael Whatley	March 8, 2024	August 22, 2025	North Carolina
	Joe Gruters	August 22, 2025	Incumbent	Florida

== See Also ==
- List of chairs of the Democratic National Committee
