= 1900 Maine gubernatorial election =

- September 10, 1900
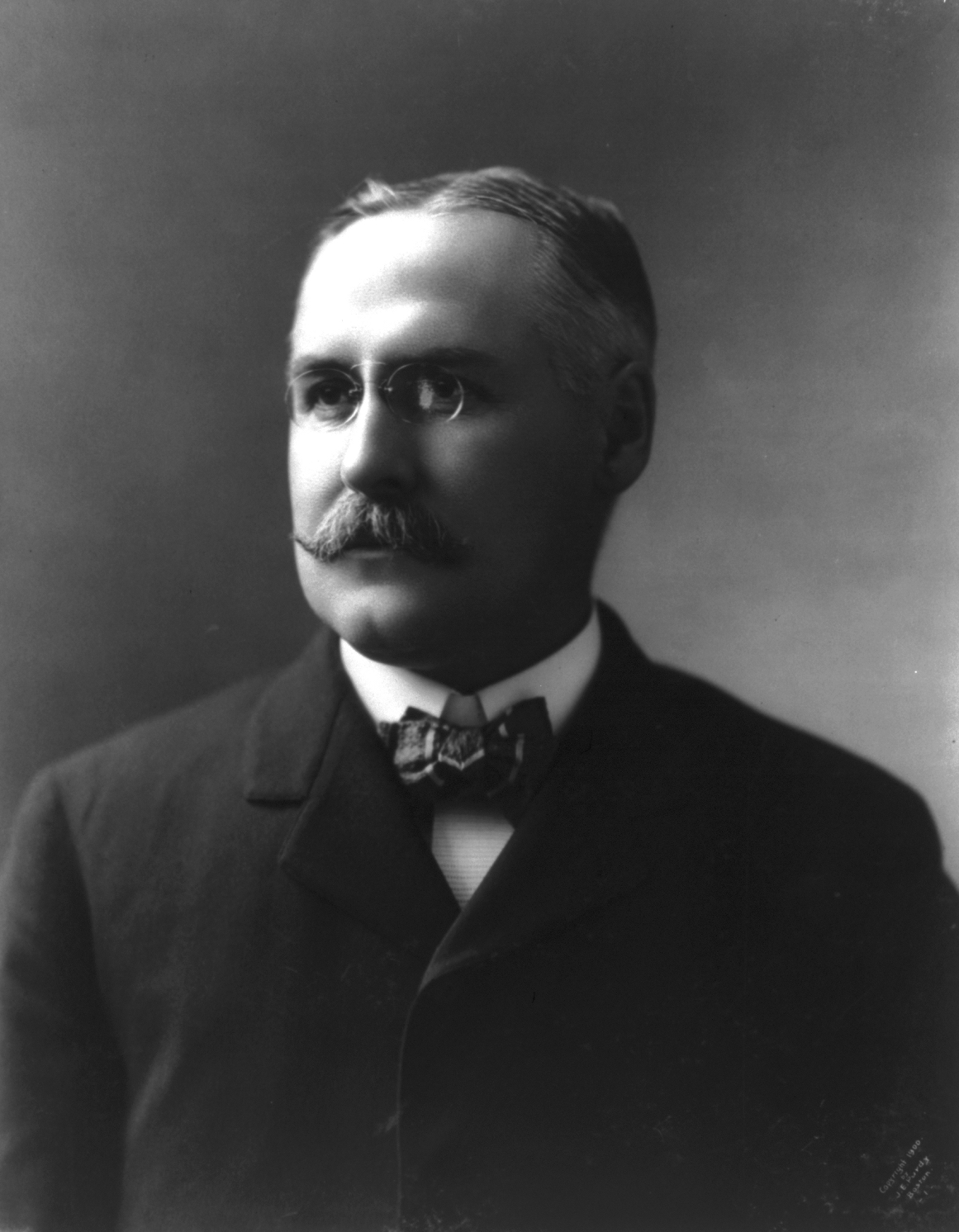

Nominee	John Fremont Hill	Samuel L. Lord
Party	Republican	Democratic
Popular vote	73,470	40,086
Percentage	62.33%	34.01%
- County results Hill: 40–50% 50–60% 60–70% 70–80%
Governor before election
Llewellyn Powers
Republican
Elected Governor
John Fremont Hill
Republican

The 1900 Maine gubernatorial election took place on September 10, 1900.

Incumbent Governor Llewellyn Powers did not seek re-election. Republican candidate John Fremont Hill defeated Democratic candidate Samuel L. Lord.

== General election ==
=== Candidates ===
Major party candidates

- Samuel L. Lord, Democratic, Democratic candidate for Governor in 1898
- John Fremont Hill, Republican, former member of the Executive Council of Maine

Other candidates

- Grant Rogers, Prohibition
- Norman Wallace Lermond, Socialist, Populist candidate for Maine's 2nd congressional district in 1892

=== Results ===
1900 Maine gubernatorial election
Party	Candidate	Votes	%	±%
Republican	John Fremont Hill	73,470	62.33%	
Democratic	Samuel L. Lord	40,086	34.01%	
Prohibition	Grant Rogers	3,648	3.09%	
Socialist	Norman Wallace Lermond	643	0.55%	
Scattering		21	0.02%	
Majority		33,384	28.32%	
Turnout		117,878		
Republican hold		Swing		
