= Frederick W. Hilles =

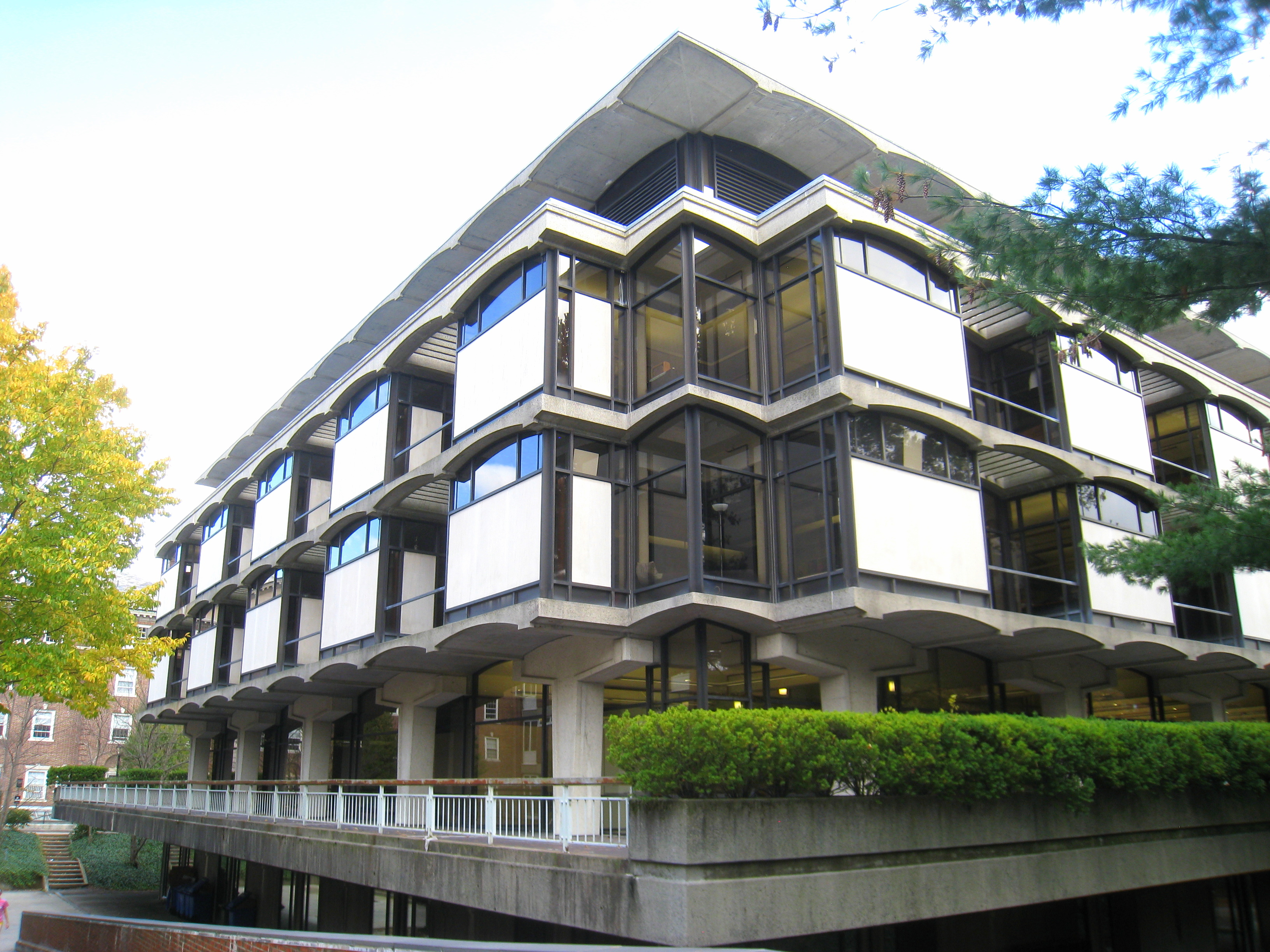
The Susan Morse and Frederick Whiley Hilles Library, Radcliffe Quadrangle, Harvard University. Named in memory of Frederick and Susan Hilles.

Frederick Whiley "Ted" Hilles (1900–1975) was Bodman Professor of English Literature at Yale University. He was a noted authority on the literary career of Sir Joshua Reynolds and edited the 1929 edition of Reynolds letters that was published by Cambridge University Press. During the Second World War he worked in intelligence for the U.S. Army at Bletchley Park in England.

== Early life and family ==
Frederick Whiley Hilles was born in 1900; he was a son of Republican leader Charles D. Hilles and his wife Dollie Bell Whiley. On 14 June 1930, he married Susan Morse (1905-2002) and they spent the first year of their marriage in England, returning to Yale in 1931. They had two children, Susan Ensign (Hilles) Bush and Frederick Whiley Hilles Jr., five grandchildren and six great-grandchildren. Susan was active in the American Birth Control League that campaigned to have birth control legalized in Connecticut.

== Career ==
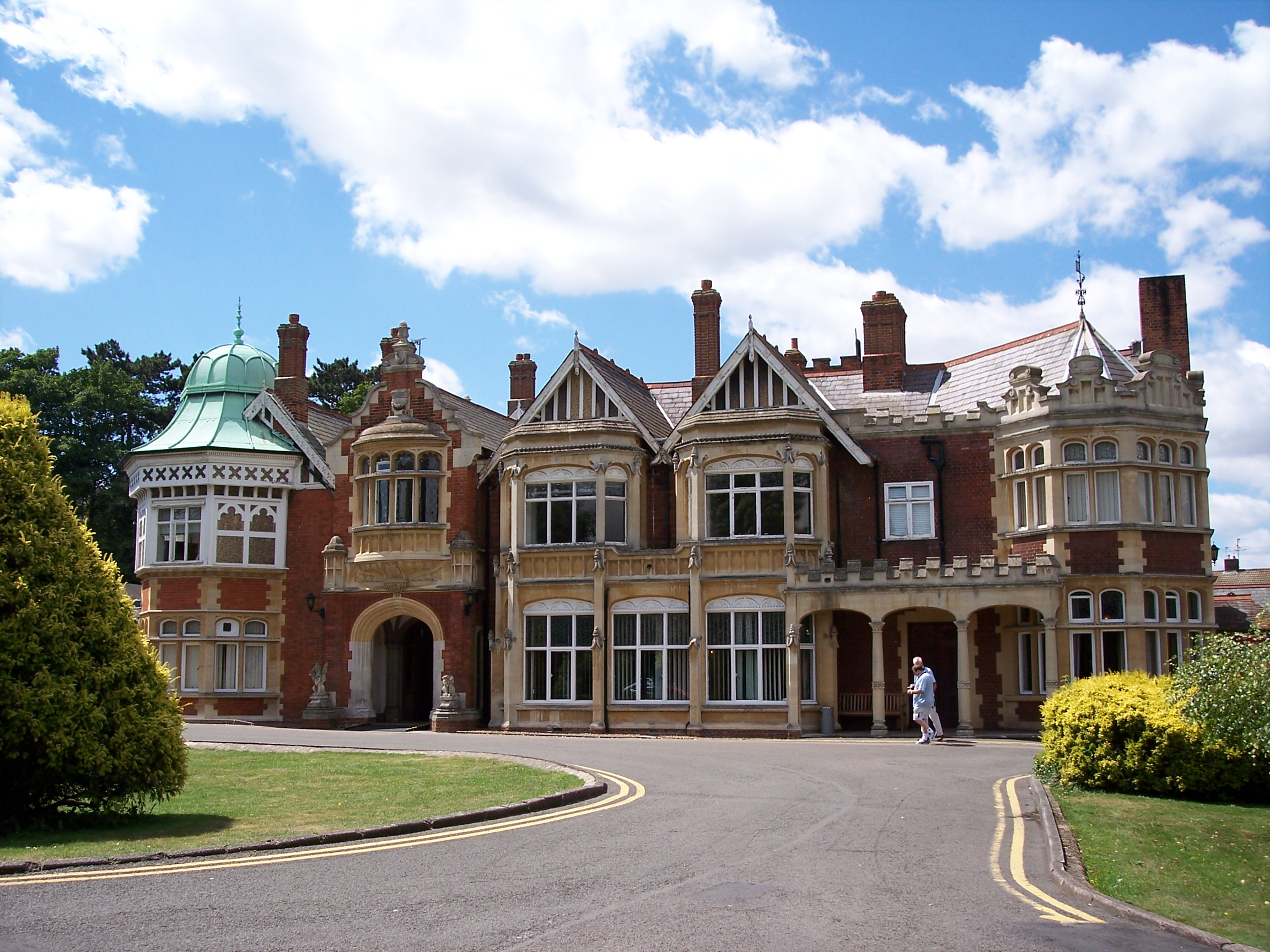
Bletchley Park, England.

Hilles was a fellow, and later Bodman Professor of English Literature, at Trumbull College, Yale University. He was a noted authority on the writings of Sir Joshua Reynolds and edited Reynolds letters which were published by Cambridge University Press in 1929. His book on The literary career of Sir Joshua Reynolds (1936) was an important source for Robert R. Wark's editing of the 1959 edition of Reynolds's Discourses. Hilles' book was dedicated to his friend and mentor Chauncey Brewster Tinker. Later, Hilles was described as "the greatest living Reynolds collector".

During the Second World War, Hilles served in intelligence with the United States Army rising to the rank of lieutenant colonel. He was one of many American officers, mostly of an academic background, posted to England to work at the code-breaking centre at Bletchley Park in Buckinghamshire. There, Hilles was in charge of the day-to-day operations of the MIS group in Hut 3 which was responsible for dissemination intelligence gleaned from Ultra to American channels as provided for by the agreement between the Americans and British of 7 May 1943. He lived at The Hunt Hotel at Linslade near Leighton Buzzard and drove daily to Bletchley and made frequent trips to Cambridge and London. The MIS unit at Bletchley was closed down in July 1945 and he subsequently wrote the history of it for the U.S. Government. His account was originally classed Secret but was declassified in 2012.

Returning to civilian life at Yale, Hilles was promoted to full professor in 1948.

Hilles played a key part in the acquisition by Yale of the papers of Ezra Pound.

== Death and legacy ==
Frederick W. Hilles died in 1975. Susan Hilles funded the construction of the Susan Morse and Frederick Whiley Hilles Library (commonly known as the Hilles Library) for Radcliffe College, now part of Harvard University, in their joint memory.

== Selected publications ==
- https://archives.yale.edu/search?utf8=%E2%9C%93&op%5B%5D=&q%5B%5D=Frederick+W.+Hilles+Manuscript+Collection+and+Papers&limit=&field%5B%5D=&from_year%5B%5D=&to_year%5B%5D=&commit=SearchLetters of Sir Joshua Reynolds. Cambridge University Press, Cambridge, 1929. (Editor)
- The literary career of Sir Joshua Reynolds. University Press, Cambridge, & Macmillan, New York, 1936.
- "Sir Joshua's prose" in The age of Johnson: Essays presented to Chauncey Brewster Tinker., F.W. Hilles (Ed.) Yale University Press, New Haven, 1949.
- Portraits by Sir Joshua Reynolds: Character sketches of Oliver Goldsmith, Samuel Johnson, and David Garrick together with other manuscripts of Reynolds &c. William Heinemann, 1952.
- New light on Dr. Johnson. Essays on the occasion of his 250th birthday. Archon Books, 1967. (Editor and contributor)

== See also ==
- John Edgcumbe
- John Ingamells
- Edmond Malone
