= J. Harry Covington =

American politician and judge (1870–1942)

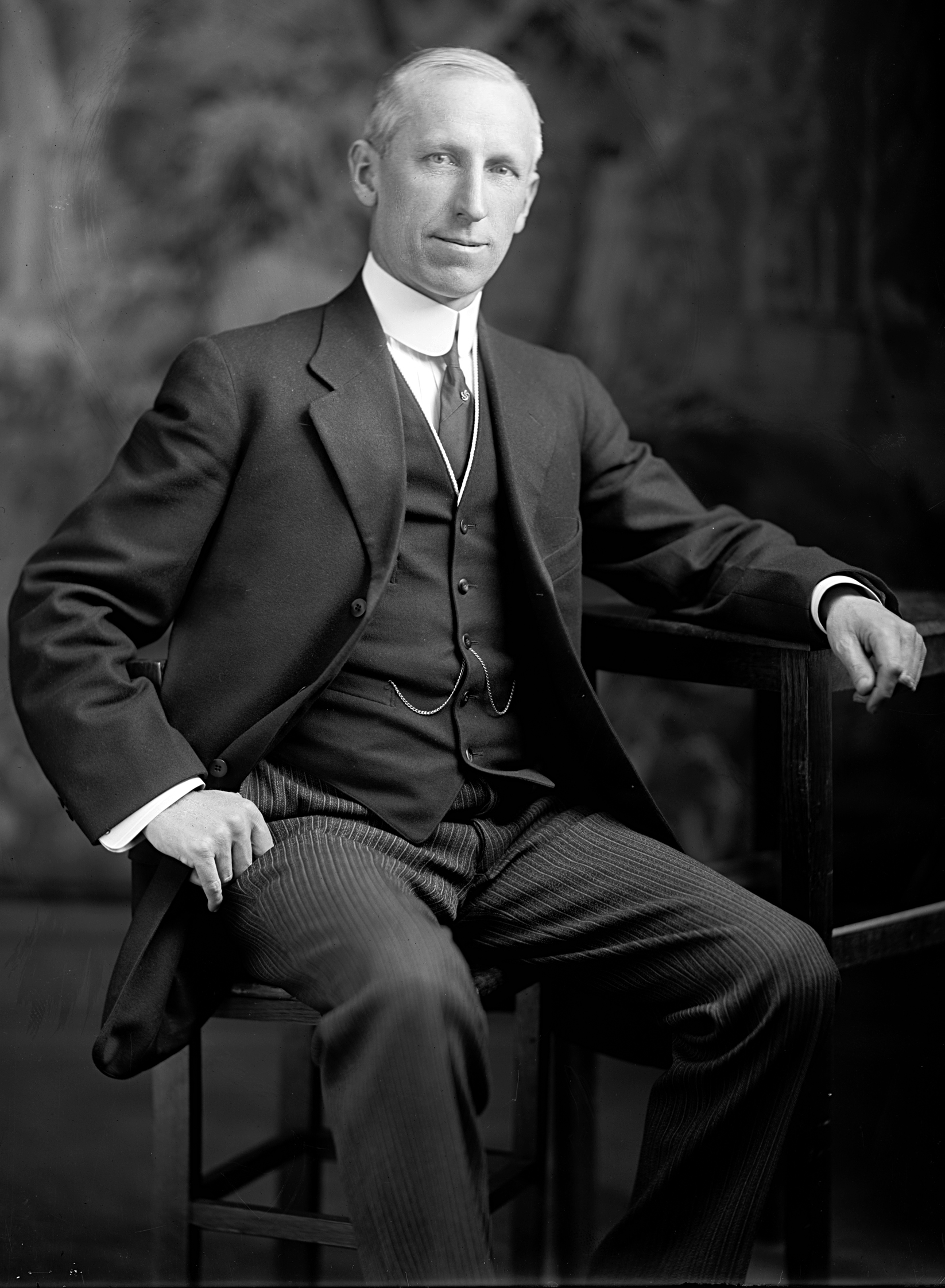

Chief Justice of the Supreme Court of the District of Columbia
- In office June 15, 1914 – May 31, 1918
- Appointed by: Woodrow Wilson
- Preceded by: Harry M. Clabaugh
- Succeeded by: Walter I. McCoy

Member of the U.S. House of Representatives from Maryland's 1st district
- In office March 4, 1909 – September 30, 1914
- Preceded by: William Humphreys Jackson
- Succeeded by: Jesse Price

Personal details
- Born: James Harry Covington; May 3, 1870 Easton, Maryland, U.S.
- Died: February 4, 1942 (aged 71) Washington, D.C., U.S.
- Resting place: Spring Hill Cemetery; Easton, Maryland, U.S.
- Party: Democratic
- Education: University of Pennsylvania Law School (LL.B.)

James Harry Covington (May 3, 1870 – February 4, 1942) was a United States representative from Maryland and chief justice of the Supreme Court of the District of Columbia. He founded the major law firm of Covington & Burling.

== Education and career ==
Born on May 3, 1870, in Easton, Talbot County, Maryland, Covington received academic training in the public schools of Talbot County and the Maryland Military and Naval Academy at Oxford. He received a Bachelor of Laws in 1894 from the University of Pennsylvania Law School. He entered private practice in Easton starting in 1894. He was an unsuccessful Democratic nominee for the Maryland Senate in 1901. He was state's attorney for Talbot County from 1903 to 1908.

== Congressional service ==
Covington was elected as a Democrat from Maryland's 1st congressional district to the United States House of Representatives of the 61st, 62nd and 63rd United States Congresses and served from March 4, 1909, until his resignation on September 30, 1914, to accept a judicial position.

== Federal judicial service ==
Covington was nominated by President Woodrow Wilson on June 8, 1914, to the Chief Justice seat on the Supreme Court of the District of Columbia (now the United States District Court for the District of Columbia) vacated by Chief Justice Harry M. Clabaugh. He was confirmed by the United States Senate on June 15, 1914, and received his commission the same day. His service terminated on May 31, 1918, due to his resignation.

=== Special investigation ===
Covington was well regarded by President Wilson, who in 1917 gave him charge of an investigation of the radical trade union the Industrial Workers of the World (IWW). The investigation lasted several weeks and preceded coordinated mass raids by the United States Department of Justice against the IWW on September 5, 1917.

== Later career and death ==
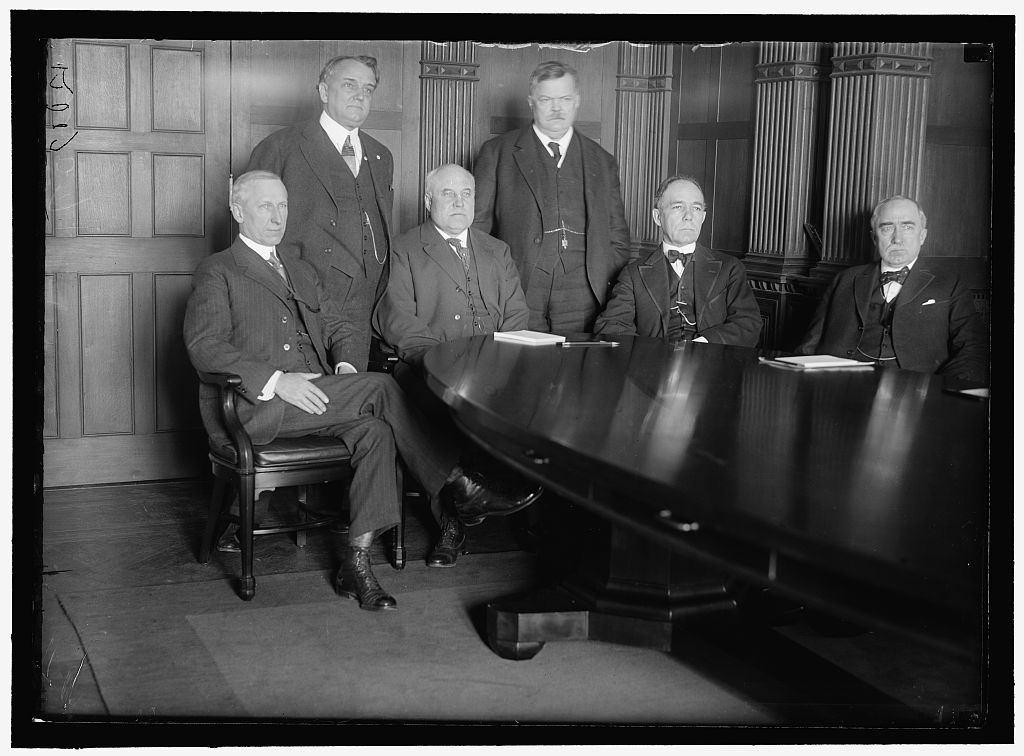
Railway Wage Commission with seated James Harry Covington, Franklin Knight Lane, Charles Caldwell McChord, William Russell Willcox. Standing are William A. Ryan and Frederick William Lehmann.

Covington returned to private practice in Washington, D.C. from 1918 to 1942. He was a Professor of Law for Georgetown University from 1914 to 1919. He was a member of the Railway Wage Commission in 1918. He died on February 4, 1942, in Washington, D.C. He was interred in Spring Hill Cemetery in Easton.

=== Covington & Burling ===
Covington and Edward B. Burling established the law firm of Covington & Burling on January 1, 1919. Covington & Burling is the oldest law firm headquartered in Washington, D.C., with 1,000 attorneys in offices across the world.

== Other service ==
Covington served as Worthy Grand Master on the Supreme Executive Committee of the Kappa Sigma fraternity from 1892 to 1894.

== Sources ==
- "J. Harry Covington". Biographical Directory of the United States Congress.

U.S. House of Representatives
| Preceded by William Humphreys Jackson | Member of the U.S. House of Representatives from Maryland's 1st congressional district 1909–1914 | Succeeded by Jesse Price |
Legal offices
| Preceded by Harry M. Clabaugh | Chief Justice of the Supreme Court of the District of Columbia; 1914–1918 | Succeeded by Walter I. McCoy |
