= Maryland Military and Naval Academy =

School in Oxford, Maryland (1885–1887)

- Oxford, Maryland; United States

Information
- School type: Private military preparatory
- Established: September 16, 1885
- Founder: Col. Oswald Tilghman
- Closed: April 6, 1887
- Superintendent: Major Benedict J. Burges; Major George A. Armes

Maryland Military and Naval Academy was a military academy in Oxford, Maryland that opened in 1885 and closed in 1887. It served as a preparatory school for the U.S. Naval Academy and the United States Military Academy, matching both in size and activity.

== History ==
Maryland Military and Naval Academy opened on September 6, 1885, in Oxford, Maryland. Col. Oswald Tilghman, a Confederate veteran and alumnus of the similarly named Maryland Military Academy, led its founders. Tilghman's father, West Point-educated General Tench Tilghman, founded the Maryland Military Academy in 1847, a preparatory school in Oxford that closed in 1855 after a fire destroyed the student's facilities. The new academy was a revival of the former school but was not considered the same institution.

Maryland Military and Naval Academy advertised that it offered instruction, lifestyle, and discipline of the U.S. Naval Academy in Annapolis or the United States Military Academy in West Point. In November 1885, The Elyria Republican noted that the school provided "a chance for a young man from this district to be educated, cheaply..." through a Congressional appointment to a one-year cadetship. Appointed students did not pay for boarding but were charged $125 each term for tuition and around $10 for washing and incidentals. Their uniform cost an additional $37 a year and was identical to those of West Point, in grey with a tight jacket, cap, and a black stripe on the trouser legs. The cost per term was $500 for students without appointments. The General Assembly of Maryland passed an act to incorporate the academy in January 1886.

=== Financial struggles ===
On Saturday, September 24, 1886, the academy's head cooks and other servants quit their positions, claiming they had not been paid. This resulted in 180 cadets going without dinner. Four cadets, hungry and intoxicated on pear cider, went to the quarters of associate superintendent J. C. M. Johnston. The cadets assaulted Johnston and cut off his beard with shears. The next day, fifty cadets left campus, going to River View House where they paid fifty cents for a meal. Johnston left the academy; however, the cooks and servants did return to work.

=== Embezzlement scheme uncovered ===
In January 1887, superintendent B. J. Burges convinced George A. Armes, a retired U.S. Army major from Alexandria, to purchase the academy for around $25,000. Once Armes received his commission to serve as the academy's superintendent and took over, Burges left town and disappeared. After about a month, Armes learned Burges had embezzled more than $50,000. Burges' scheme involved ordering goods for the academy from small cities across the east. Once the goods were received at the academy, Burges reshipped the items to his brother in a nearby city and later disposed of the stolen goods. Burge had paid creditors for the goods with more than 100 bad checks written against the academy's account. Later, it was learned that Burges had a history of starting schools and military academies, leaving them with thousands of dollars of debt.

Soon, the students and teachers began to complain about poor accommodations. Armes discharged teachers that he felt were lacking and expelled some students for insubordination; this resulted in other students leaving the academy. By March 4, 1887, the academy only had seven out of thirteen teachers and around 150 students, down the 184 cadets at the start of the term. In March 1887, cadet Frank Abell withdrew from the academy, citing poor food, bedding, and drinking water.

=== Investigation ===
The state of Maryland had an interest in the academy because it was incorporated by the legislature and had styled itself as a Maryland institution. Governor Henry Lloyd appointed a Board of Inspectors for the Maryland Military and Naval Academy on March 2, 1887. The Board of Inspectors consisted of Dr. James L. Bryan of Cambridge, Thomas C. Bruff of Baltimore County, the Rev. William Dale of Snow Hill, and chairman General James Howard of Baltimore, P. A. Witmer of Washington County. The board conducted its one-day investigation on March 22, 1887.

The Board of Inspectors reported its findings of "the grossest mismanagement of [the academy's] affairs" and "that a great wrong and injustice had been imposed on the Professors and Cadets..." The committee also found that Armes had no funds on hands and was either unwilling or unable, due to lack of credit, to purchase needed supplies. For example, students who had paid their full tuition had insufficient clothing for the current winter season, and their meals were low in quality and quantity. In addition, only two or three small rooms were being heated in the entire facility, and the fuel on hand was predicted to last for a few more days. Hygiene was poor, and the interior water was not "fit for any purpose".

=== Closure ===
The Maryland Military and Naval Academy closed on April 6, 1887. Before closing the academy, Armes paid its legitimate debts, excluding those illegally caused by Burges that totaled around $20,000. Armes also hired two detectives to search for Burges. The academy's students were transferred to St. John's College in Annapolis. The United States government detailed naval and army officers to St. John's to continue the cadet's preparatory education. The Maryland legislature revoked the Maryland Military and Naval Academy's incorporation in 1890.

After the academy closed, the property was offered for sale or lease. A United States Marshall sold the academy's furniture and the ship Winifred to cover a court judgment against Burges as the school's superintendent. Oswald Tilghman purchased many of the academy's assets, including "desks...queens ware...washbowls, philosophical apparatus and instruments, muskets, one organ...together with the buildings." Eastford Hall reopened as a hotel sometime after June 1891. A former cadet, James F. Fry purchased it. However, a fire destroyed most of the building in 1894. Ten years after the closing of the Maryland Military and Naval Academy, Oswald Tilghman founded the Maryland Nautical Academy of Talbot County.

Maryland Military and Naval Academy, circa 1885.

== Campus ==
The Maryland Military and Naval Academy was south of the town square in Oxford, Maryland. Its location was accessible to the major cities of the eastern United States. Its main building was Eastford Hall, a former resort hotel that Oswald Tilghman leased for the school. Constructed in 1878, the three-story Eastford Hall was on Morris Street and overlooked the Tred Avon River. It was steam heated and had gas lighting.

The campus included assembly rooms, drill grounds, and a gymnasium. A two-story dormitory wing was along the property's southern border toward the river. The campus facilities also included the schooner Winfred and the clipper ship Amazon, practice ships anchored in the saltwater Tred Avon River.

== Student population ==
Enrollment for the first year was 254 cadets, with students from thirty states. Some cadets came from wealthy families in New York or were the sons of congressmen Charles M. Anderson of Ohio, John G. Ballentine of Tennessee, Edwin S. Osborne of Pennsylvania, Samuel R. Peters of Kansas, Joseph Wheeler of Alabama, and others. The cadets in the initial year ranged from ages 13 to 22.

In December 1885, thirteen-year-old cadet Patrick J. Gavagan of Michigan accidentally shot and killed fourteen-year-old cadet Richard O. Reinhard of Indiana with a pistol. The News of Frederick, Maryland wrote an editorial saying, "We cannot help thinking the Professors of the school were remiss in permitting Gavagan...possess a pistol. Of course, it was concealed from them, but did they use the necessary precaution to deprive the boys of such deadly weapons? We are afraid they did not."

Perhaps because of the shooting and this criticism, cadets had to be at least fourteen years old and 4 feet 6 inches tall for the fall 1886 term. That fall, 254 cadets enrolled from 33 states and two territories.

== Faculty ==
The academy's sixteen faculty were graduates of Yale College, West Point and Annapolis, and other top colleges. In September 1886, Captain J. C. Lynes joined the faculty as chair of the modern languages department. Lynes was previously the associate principal of King's Mountain Military School and head of the department of natural sciences at the State Normal School. The Governor of Maryland promoted Lynes to the rank of major in the Maryland State troops with his new position at the academy. Similarly, military professor Edmund H. Hinton was commissioned as a major in the Maryland State troops.

Col. Richard L. Baker came from Virginia to teach history at the academy. J. C. M. Johnston was a professor and associate superintendent. He previously taught at the Georgia Military Academy. News reports indicated that Johnston "was not popular with the cadets"; he resigned from his position in September 1886. In 1886, Rev. Lyman Brown Wharton became the head of ancient languages at the academy. Wharton graduated from the University of Virginia and had previously taught at the College of Wiliam and Mary, Bellevue High School, and Hanover Academy in Virginia. (He returned to William and Mary after the academy closed).

== Extracurricular activities ==
The academy had two social fraternities. The Delta chapter of Kappa Sigma fraternity formed at the academy on October 19, 1885. It inducted 31 brothers before the school closed in April 1887. Gamma chapter of Gamma Delta Psi high school fraternity operated at the academy from 1885 until the school closing.

The cadets attended church on Sundays. They attended social events such as the holiday hop in December. On February 19, 1886, the academy held an Intermediate Hop that featured a band and female guests from Baltimore, Cambridge, and Easton, Maryland.

In April 1886, 100 cadets went on a ten-day Easter break cruise along the Potomac River and down the Chesapeake Bay to Old Point Comfort. In August 1886, 75 cadets went on a summer cruise on the academy's clipper ship, Amazon, sailing along the Chesapeake Bay and up to Newport, Rhode Island.

== Leadership ==
Maryland Military and Naval Academy's superintendent was Major Benedict J. Burges who had studied at the Virginia Military Institute. Because of his role with the academy, Burges received a commission as a colonel in the Maryland State troops. The academy's associate superintendent was J. C. M. Johnston; he resigned in September 1886. Its secretary was R. H. Rogers, and George M. Tull was its commissary.

Major George A. Armes replaced Burges as superintendent after purchasing the academy in early 1887. Armes hired and then fired a month later, a Lt. Jenkins, formerly of the 4th Cavalry, as commandant.

The 1886 Board of Visitors included:

- Charles Marley Anderson, U.S. Representative (Ohio 4)
- Dr. G. F. J. Colburn
- Charles Hopper Gibson, U.S. Representative (Maryland 1)
- Arthur Pue Gorman, U.S. Senator (Maryland)
- James Black Groome, former Maryland Governor and former Maryland Senator
- Dr. Samuel A. Harrison
- Henry Lloyd, ex-officio, Maryland Governor
- Edwin Sylvanus Osborne, U.S. Representative (Pennsylvania 12 and at-large)
- James Pidcock, U.S. Representative (New Jersey 4)
- Philip Francis Thomas, former Maryland Governor
- Col. Oswald Tilghman
- Col Samuel Wetherill
- Ephraim King Wilson II, U.S. Senator (Maryland)

== Notable alumni ==
- Frank G. Abell, photographer
- Samuel G. Allen, railroad industrialist
- Charles Bell Burke, head of the University of Tennessee English Department from 1923 to 1942 and vice president of Southwestern Baptist University
- J. Harry Covington, U.S. Representative (Maryland 1), Chief Justice seat on the Supreme Court of the District of Columbia, Worthy Grand Master of Kappa Sigma (founder of the Kappa Sigma chapter at the Academy)
- Charles D. Hilles, chairman of the Republican National Committee
- Theodore F. Morse, songwriter
- John S. Newman, circuit judge, attorney, and president of the Maryland State Bar Association
- Thomas Leidy Rhoads, a colonel in the U.S. Army and Navy, military aid and the physician to Presidents William Howard Taft and Woodrow Wilson, and namesake of a former Army hospital in Utica, New York
- Frederick Charles Von Rosenberg, attorney and Texas politician

== See also ==
- List of defunct military academies in the United States
