= Charles Burke =

Charles Burke may refer to:

- Charles H. Burke (1861–1944), American politician
- Charles Burke (British Army officer) (1882–1917)
- Charles Burke (cricketer) (1853–1904), English cricketer
- Charles Bell Burke (1867–1953), American academic administrator and university professor
- Charlie Burke (born 1979), former head coach of the Hong Kong National Men and Women's cricket teams
- Chuck Burke (1930–2025), American Olympic speed skater

== See also ==
- Charles Burke Elbrick (1908–1983), American ambassador
