= William Russell Willcox =

American politician (1863–1940)

William Willcox
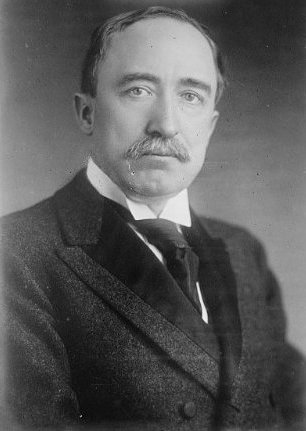

Chair of the Republican National Committee
- In office June 27, 1916 – February 13, 1918
- Preceded by: Charles D. Hilles
- Succeeded by: Will H. Hays

Postmaster of New York City
- In office January 1, 1905 – July 1, 1907
- President: Theodore Roosevelt
- Preceded by: Cornelius Van Cott
- Succeeded by: Edward M. Morgan

Personal details
- Born: William Russell Willcox; April 11, 1863 Smyrna, New York, U.S.
- Died: April 9, 1940 (aged 76) Bay Shore, New York, U.S.
- Party: Republican
- Education: University of Rochester (BA); Columbia University (LLB)

William Russell Willcox (April 11, 1863 – April 9, 1940) was an American politician from New York. On January 1, 1905, he became the Postmaster of New York City. By 1909 he was chairman of the New York Public Service Commission. He served on the Railway Wage Commission in 1918.

== Biography ==
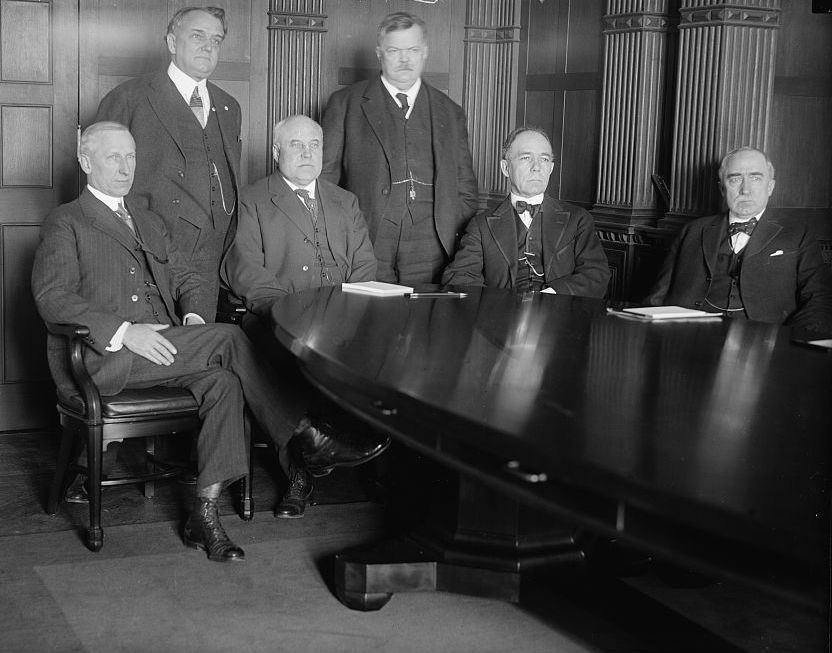
Railway Wage Commission with a seated James Harry Covington, Franklin Knight Lane, Charles Caldwell McChord, and William Russell Willcox. Standing are William A. Ryan and Frederick William Lehmann.

He was born on April 11, 1863, in Smyrna, New York, to Thomas L. Willcox. He attended the state normal school in Brockport, New York. He later attended the University of Rochester.

He served as principal of the Webster Academy and Spring Valley High School. He then attended Columbia Law School, and was admitted to the bar in 1890.

Around 1901 Mayor Seth Low appointed him to the New York City Department of Parks and Recreation where he served for two years as president of the commission.

In 1904, he married Martha J. Havemeyer, descendant of Mayor William Frederick Havemeyer.

On January 1, 1905, he became the Postmaster of New York City. He was appointed by Theodore Roosevelt.

On July 1, 1907, he became chairman of the New York Public Service Commission.

Willcox served as chairman of the Republican National Committee from 1916 to 1918. He encouraged Republican congressmen during votes for the 19th Amendment

Willcox resigned after being appointed to the Railway Wage Commission, also known as the U.S. Railroad Commission in 1918. Others appointed by the Woodrow Wilson administration were U.S. Secretary of the Interior Franklin Knight Lane, Charles Caldwell McChord of the Interstate Commerce Commission and D.C. chief justice J. Harry Covington. The commission investigated railroad wages.

According to a 1935 intelligence report compiled by the U.S. War Department, William's son Frederick H. Wilcox was arrested and "held in connection with the smuggling of arms, ammunition and other war materials into Cuba" at Principe Fortress. He and his fellow alleged conspirators were later transferred to Triscornia and deported to the United States.

He became a widower in 1939. He died on April 9, 1940, a Southside Hospital in Bayshore, New York.

Party political offices
Preceded by Charles D. Hilles	Chair of the Republican National Committee; 1916–1918	Succeeded by Will H. Hays
