= Edward M. Morgan =

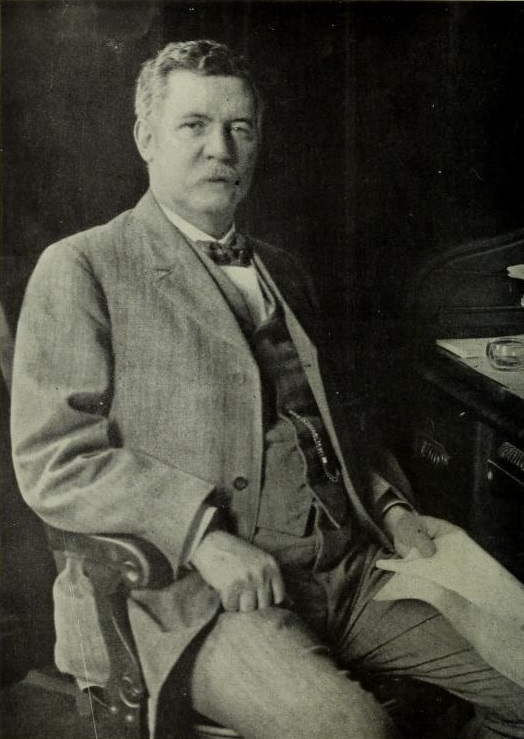
- Morgan in 1907
- Born: 1855
- Died: January 9, 1925 (aged 69–70); New York, New York
- Occupations: Postman, Postmaster
- Employer: United States Post Office Department
- Title: Postmaster of New York City
- Term: 1907-1917, 1921-1925
- Predecessor: William Russell Willcox
- Successor: John J. Kiely

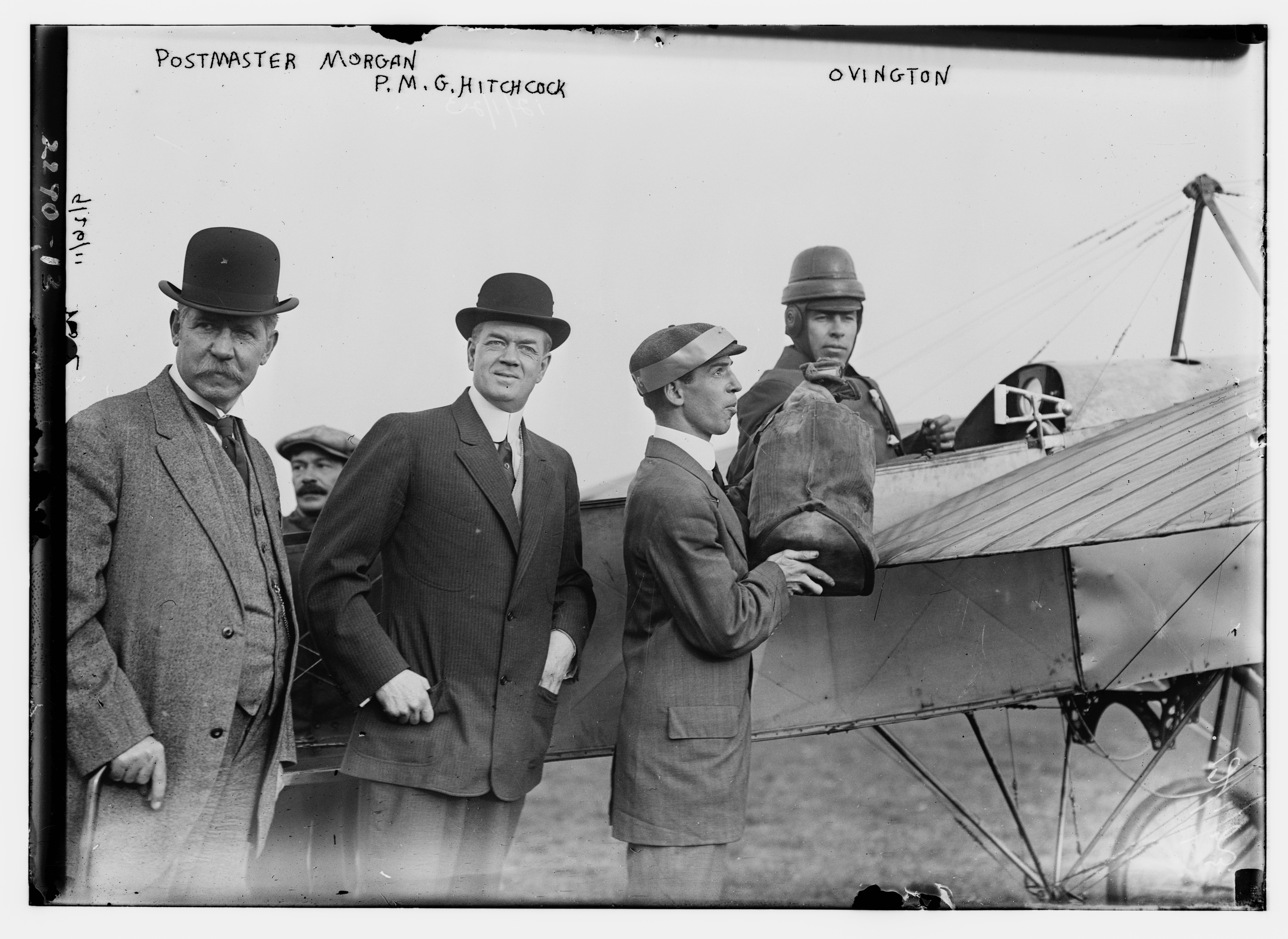
Edward M. Morgan, Frank Harris Hitchcock, and Earle Lewis Ovington

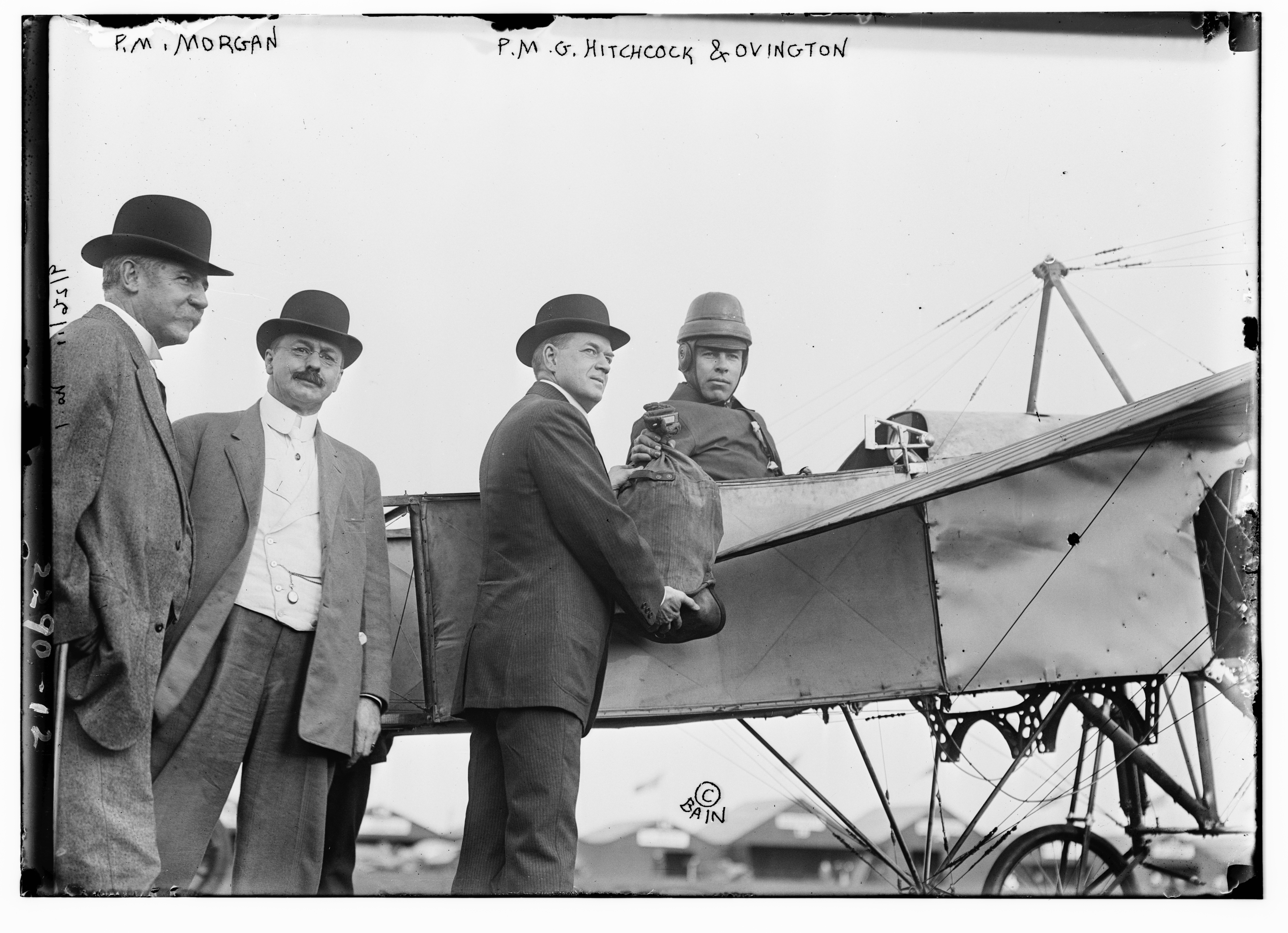
Edward M. Morgan, Frank Harris Hitchcock, and Earle Lewis Ovington

Edward M. Morgan (1855 - January 9, 1925) was the Postmaster of New York City for the first delivery of airmail by Earle Lewis Ovington.

== Biography ==
He was born in 1855. Morgan started off as a letter carrier, and was appointed Postmaster of New York City by President Theodore Roosevelt on August 14, 1907, succeeding William R. Willcox, who had resigned to head the Public Service Board. Thomas F. Murphy was appointed as the assistant Postmaster. On December 13, 1911, President William Howard Taft reappointed him to another term of office.

He died on January 9, 1925, at the Lutheran Hospital in New York City.
