= 1896 Maine gubernatorial election =

- September 14, 1896
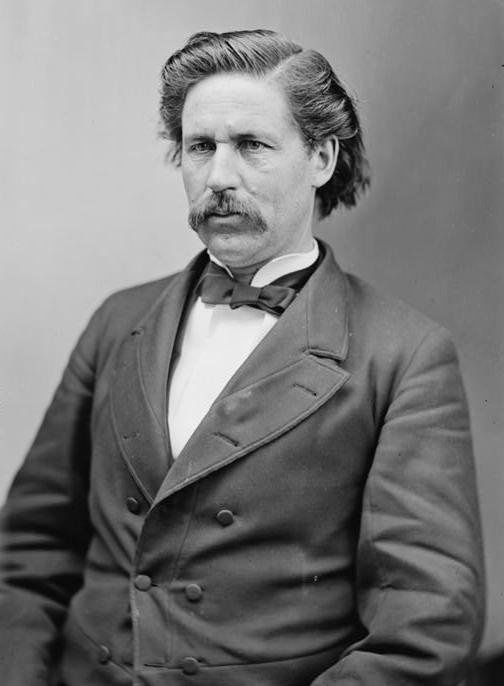

Nominee	Llewellyn Powers	Melvin P. Frank
Party	Republican	Democratic
Popular vote	82,596	34,350
Percentage	66.84%	27.80%
- County results Powers: 50–60% 60–70% 70–80%
Governor before election
Henry B. Cleaves
Republican
Elected Governor
Llewellyn Powers
Republican

The 1896 Maine gubernatorial election took place on September 14, 1896.

Incumbent Governor Henry B. Cleaves did not seek re-election. Republican candidate Llewellyn Powers defeated Democratic candidate Melvin B. Frank.

== Results ==
1896 Maine gubernatorial election (Note: The Maine Senate Journal records the result as Powers 82,876, Frank 34,453, Bateman 3,306, Ladd 2,714, Clifford 610, scattering 31.)
Party	Candidate	Votes	%	±%
Republican	Llewellyn Powers	82,596	66.84%	
Democratic	Melvin P. Frank	34,350	27.80%	
Populist	Luther C. Bateman	3,292	2.66%	
Prohibition	Ammi S. Ladd	2,669	2.16%	
National Democratic	William H. Clifford	609	0.49%	
Scattering		48	0.04%	
Majority		48,246	39.05%	
Turnout		123,564		
Republican hold		Swing		
