= Chauncey Brewster Tinker =

20th-century English scholar and academic

Chauncey B. Tinker
- Born: Chauncey Brewster Tinker; October 22, 1876; Auburn, Maine
- Died: March 10, 1963 (aged 86)

Academic background
- Education: Yale University
- Thesis: The Translations of Beowulf: A Critical Biography (1903)

Chauncey Brewster Tinker (October 22, 1876 – March 10, 1963) was a scholar of English Literature and Sterling Professor at Yale University.

== Early life ==
Tinker was born on October 22, 1876, in Auburn, Maine to Anson Phelps Tinker, a Yale graduate and minister, and Martha White. He attended East Denver High School, then went to Yale to receive a BA (1899), MA (1900), and PhD (1902), after which he joined the school's faculty.

== Career ==
In 1923, Tinker was made Sterling Professor of English Literature, and remained at the university until 1945.

At Yale, Tinker was instrumental in establishing a rare books collection, of which he was named the curator in 1931, and in founding the Elizabethan Club. His early work, completed in collaboration with Albert Stanburrough Cook, focused on Old English literature, while the remainder of his career focused on eighteenth century English literary scholarship, including that of Samuel Johnson and his principal biographer, James Boswell.

As a faculty member, Tinker was known as an opponent of New Criticism.

In Possessed by Memory (2019) Harold Bloom describes Tinker as “a scholar noted for the appearance of stigmata upon him during Passion Week.”

== Death ==
Tinker died on March 10, 1963, and is buried at Grove Street Cemetery in New Haven, Connecticut.

== Selected publications ==
- Cook, Albert S.; Tinker, Chauncey Brewster (1902). Select Translations of Old English Poetry. Boston: Ginn & Company.
- Tinker, Chauncey Brewster (1903). The Translations of Beowulf: A Critical Biography. Yale studies in English,16. New York: Henry Holt.
- —— (1915). The Salon and English Letters: Chapters on the Interrelations of Literature and Society in the Age of Johnson. New York: MacMillan.
- —— (1922). Nature's Simple Plan: A Phase of Radical Thought in the Mid-Eighteenth Century. Princeton: Princeton University Press.
- —— (1922). Young Boswell. Boston: Atlantic Monthly Press.
- —— (1924). Letters of James Boswell. Oxford: Clarendon Press.
- —— (1926). The Wedgwood Medallion of Samuel Johnson: A Study in Iconography. Cambridge: Harvard University Press.
- —— (1929). The Good Estate of Poetry. Boston: Little, Brown & Company.
- —— (1938). Painter and Poet: Studies in the Literary Relations of English Painting. Cambridge: Harvard University Press.
- —— (1948). Dionysos in Doubt: Collected Articles and Addresses. New Haven: Yale University Press.

== See also ==
- Frederick W. Hilles
