= Railway Wage Commission =

US federal commission (1918–1920)

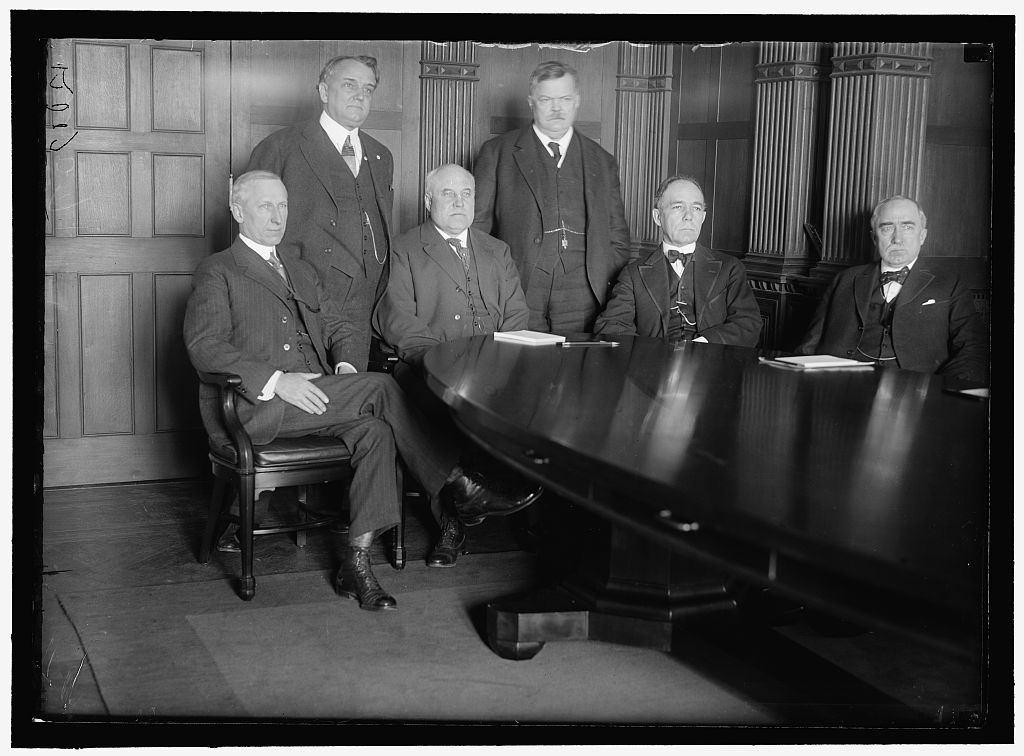
Railway Wage Commission with seated James Harry Covington, Franklin Knight Lane, Charles Caldwell McChord, William Russell Willcox. Standing are William A. Ryan and Frederick William Lehmann.

The Railway Wage Commission was a United States federal agency established in 1918 during World War I within the United States Railroad Administration.

== History ==
On December 26, 1917, President Woodrow Wilson issued a proclamation assuming federal control of the nation's railroad systems as a wartime measure, and designated Secretary of the Treasury William Gibbs McAdoo as Director General of Railroads, responsible for administering the transportation systems under federal control. On January 18, 1918, McAdoo issued General Order No. 5, establishing the Railroad Wage Commission under this authority. McAdoo named as commissioners Secretary of the Interior Franklin Knight Lane, Interstate Commerce Commission member Charles Caldwell McChord, Chief Justice J. Harry Covington of the Supreme Court of the District of Columbia, and William Russell Willcox of New York.

The commission was created by administrative order rather than by a separate act of Congress, and its members were designated by the Director General of Railroads, rather than appointed by the President. Congress subsequently enacted the Federal Control Act of 1918, which established a statutory framework for the continued federal operation of the railroads.

The commission was authorized to examine the wages and working time of railroad employees. In February 1918 the commission was petitioned by railroad workers to pay time and a half for work over an eight-hour day. Speaking on behalf of employers was E.F. Potter, assistant to the general manager of the Minneapolis, St. Paul and Sault Ste. Marie Railroad. The commission created the Board Of Railroad Wages And Working Conditions on May 25, 1918 to hear complaints about wages and safety. The board was dissolved on April 1, 1920.

== Commissioners ==
- J. Harry Covington
- Franklin Knight Lane
- Charles Caldwell McChord of the Interstate Commerce Commission
- William Russell Willcox
- William A. Ryan
- Frederick William Lehmann.
