= John Edgcumbe =

British haematologist (1920–2001)

- John Edgcumbe
- Born: John Oliver Pearce Edgcumbe; 1920; Teignmouth, Devon, England
- Died: 18 October 2001 (aged 80–81)
- Education: Cambridge/The London Hospital
- Known for: Devon's first consultant haematologist
- Spouse(s): Teryll, née Degwell Thomas
- Children: 2
- Relatives: Joshua Reynolds
- Medical career
- Sub-specialties: Haematology
- Notable works: President of the British Society for Haematology
- Awards: Queen Square Prize for Neurology

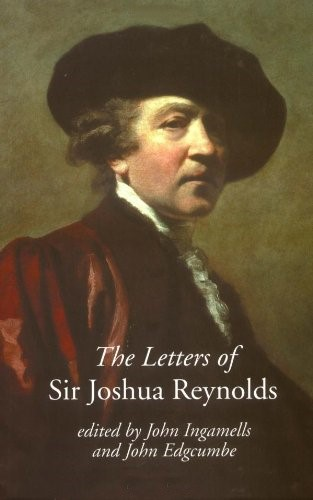
The cover of the 2000 edition of the letters of Joshua Reynolds co-edited by Edgcumbe.

John Oliver Pearce Edgcumbe FRCP (1920 – 18 October 2001) was a British medical practitioner who became Devon's first consultant haematologist. He was a collateral descendant of the painter Joshua Reynolds and co-edited, with John Ingamells, a new edition of the letters of Sir Joshua, the first for over 70 years.

== Early life and family ==
John Edgcumbe was born in Teignmouth in 1920, a collateral descendant of Joshua Reynolds. He married Teryll née Degwell) Thomas and they had a son and a daughter.

== Career ==
Edgcumbe qualified in medicine from Cambridge/The London Hospital in 1946. He received his MD in 1952. He originally leaned towards neurology and won the Queen Square Prize for Neurology in 1954, but decided to specialise instead in haematology and became Devon's first consultant haematologist. He was a fellow of the Royal College of Pathologists, president of the British Society for Haematology 1972–1973 and president of the Devon and Exeter Medical Society in 1981–1982.

== Joshua Reynolds ==
The idea for a new edition of the letters of Joshua Reynolds had been raised in the 1980s when Brian Allen and John Edgcumbe found that they were independently collecting new material and decided to collaborate. After he retired, Edgcumbe held a visiting fellowship at the Yale Center for British Art in order to complete the work. The book was eventually published by Yale University Press in 2000, jointly edited by Edgcumbe and John Ingamells. In their review of the work, The Times noted that the quantity of known letters from Reynolds had swollen by almost two-thirds since the last collected edition by Frederick W. Hilles in 1929, but lamented Reynolds uninspired prose style. Records relating to the editing of the book are held at the Paul Mellon Centre for Studies in British Art, Yale University.

Edgcumbe was a member of the Reynolds Society and the Johnson Club.

== Death ==
Edgcumbe died on 18 October 2001 at his home after suffering from prostate cancer. He was survived by his wife (died 2009) and two children.

== Publications ==
- The letters of Sir Joshua Reynolds. Yale University Press, New Haven, 2000. (Editor with John Ingamells) ISBN 978-0300087338
