= USPS Operation Santa =

US Christmas-related charity event

USPS Operation Santa (also known as Operation Santa Claus) is an annual holiday season initiative undertaken by the United States Postal Service. The program accepts and organizes letters addressed to Santa Claus and invites adopters to respond to them.

== History ==
USPS Operation Santa program began in 1912 when United States Postmaster General Frank Hitchcock authorized local postmasters to open letters addressed to Santa Claus for employees to read and respond to, with the first one starting at the James Farley Post Office.

The Postal Service opened the program to the general public in the 1940s, and corporations, charitable organizations, and individuals across America were able to participate.

In 2005 the initiative was featured on the Fox network reality TV special Dear Santa, where six children were chosen from the initiative to have their Christmas wishes granted. The special was hosted by Jim Belushi and featured appearances from celebrities that included Clay Aiken, Hilary Duff, Raven Symoné, and Tony Hawk. A compilation CD was created to coincide with the show and was sold through the United States Postal Service.

In 2017, the Postal Service modernized USPS Operation Santa by digitizing the program so that more Americans could participate. The first test market for the online pilot was New York City. The digital version of USPS Operation Santa allowed for letters addressed to Santa from across the country to be adopted online via the program's website. The digital USPS Operation Santa program was expanded nationally in 2019 when all letters became exclusively available for adoption online.

In 2020, Dana Nachman directed the documentary Dear Santa, which focused on the USPS Operation Santa program and the children who write letters to Santa.

In 2022, Localish produced Dear Santa, the Series, a six-episode documentary about USPS Operation Santa's history, highlighting stories from letter writers and Postal Service employees. In November 2024, season two of Dear Santa, the Series was released on Hulu and ABC.

In 2024, the USPS collaborated with Toys "R" Us to develop Santa's Gift Shoppe, an online catalog that allows letter adopters to select, purchase, and ship gifts directly from the new e-commerce site.

== Program operations ==
USPS Operation Santa begins to accept letters for the program on a set date in September each year. Letter-writers are encouraged to write Santa’s official USPS address on the envelope at: Santa, 123 Elf Road, North Pole, 88888. The Postal Service recommends envelopes include the sender’s full name and return address in the upper left corner and bear first-class postage, such as a USPS forever stamp. Other tips include writing legibly, listing gifts in order of preference, being specific about the gifts asked for, and avoiding asking for gifts that could be considered too expensive. Letters should also include the writer's first and last name and have a complete return address to increase the likelihood of a response.

Once the letters are received, they are anonymized and made available for adoption on the official USPS Operation Santa website.

== See also ==
- Operation Christmas Drop, annual U.S. Air Force drop over Micronesia
