= Earle Ovington =

19/20th-century American aeronautical engineer and inventor

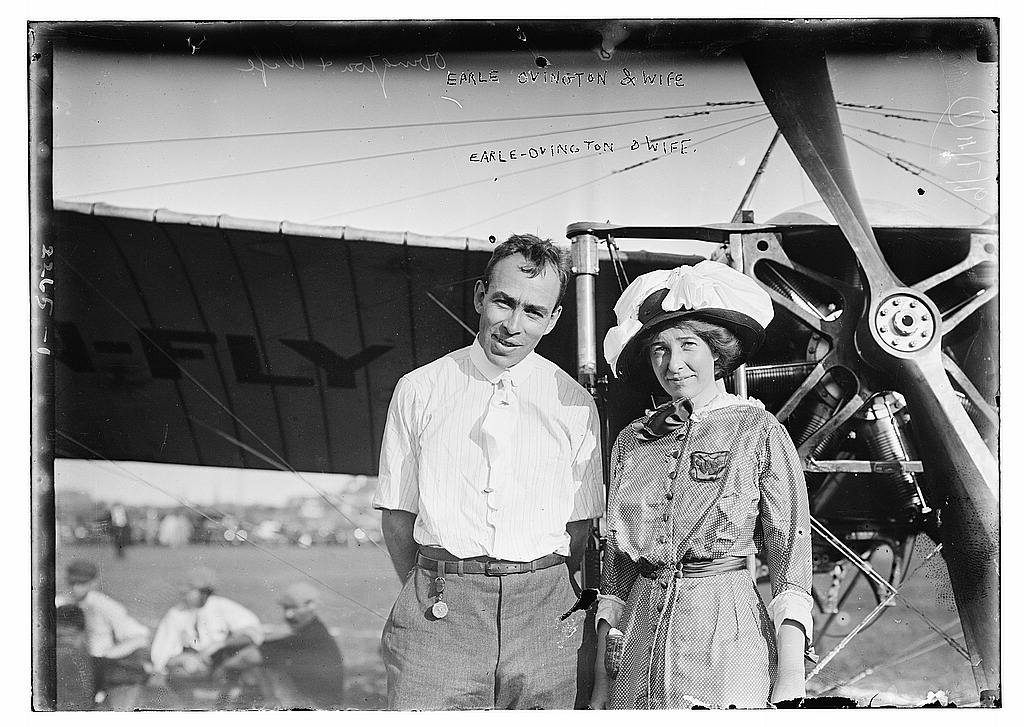
Earle Ovington and wife circa 1913 Signature of Earle Lewis Ovington

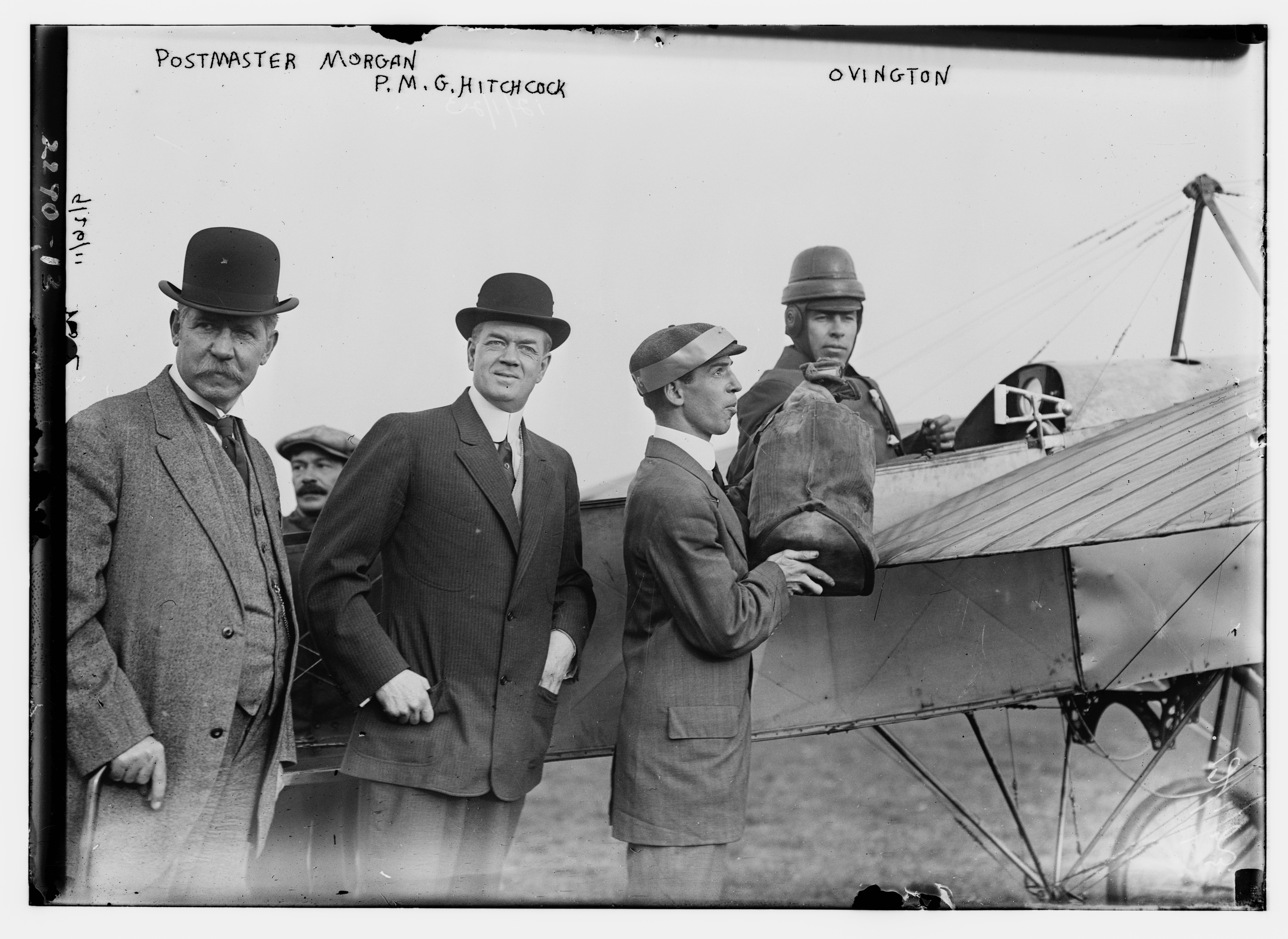
Edward M. Morgan, Frank Harris Hitchcock, and Earle Lewis Ovington and the Blériot XI

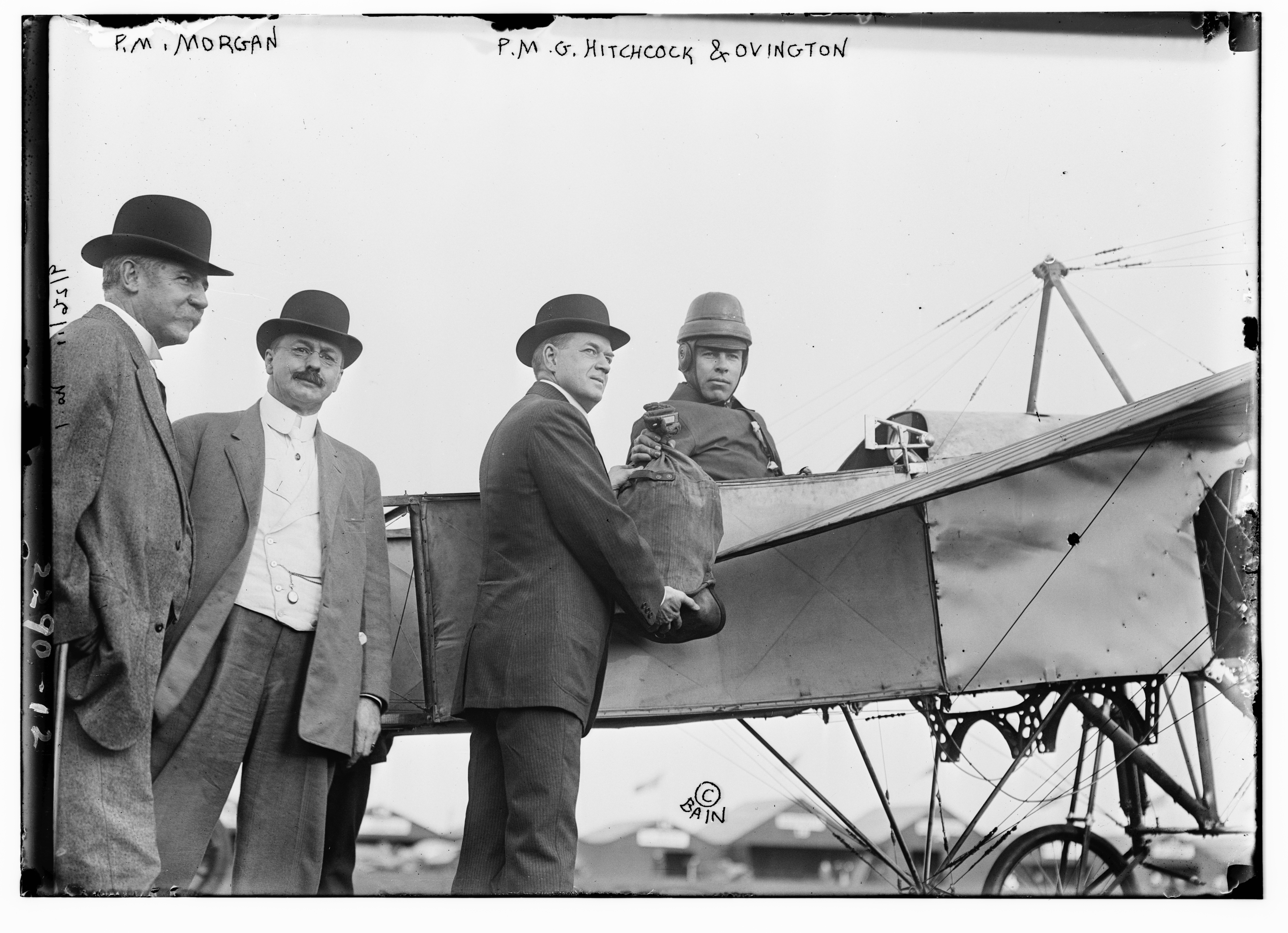
Edward M. Morgan, Frank Harris Hitchcock, and Earle Lewis Ovington

Earle Lewis Ovington (December 20, 1879 – July 21, 1936) was an American aeronautical engineer, aviator and inventor, and served as a lab assistant to Thomas Edison. Ovington piloted the first official airmail flight in the United States in a Blériot XI on September 23, 1911. He carried a sack of mail from Nassau Boulevard aerodrome, Garden City, New York, to Mineola, New York. He circled at 500 feet and tossed the bag over the side of the cockpit and the sack burst on impact, scattering letters and postcards. He delivered 640 letters and 1,280 postcards, including a letter to himself from the United States Post Office Department designating him as "Official Air Mail Pilot #1."

== Biography ==
He was born on December 20, 1879, in Chicago, Illinois. He married Adelaide in 1911 and they had two children: Earle Kester Ovington (1912–2006) and Audrey Ovington (1914-2005) He built a house in the Samarkand area of Santa Barbara, California, which included an airstrip. While this airstrip wasn't the ultimate site of the Santa Barbara Municipal Airfield, it did serve in that capacity until Ovington's death. He died on July 21, 1936. He was cremated and his ashes were scattered at sea.

== See also ==
- 1911 in aviation
- Fred J. Wiseman, first airmail flight on February 18, 1911 from Petaluma to Santa Rosa
- Dean Smith, pioneer air mail pilot
