= Samuel G. Allen =

American industrialist (1870–1956)

- Born: Samuel Gordon Allen; August 24, 1870; Warren, Pennsylvania, US
- Died: October 16, 1956 (aged 86); Pinehurst, North Carolina, US
- Burial place: Oakland Cemetery, Warren, Pennsylvania
- Occupation(s): Industrialist and lawyer
- Employers: Lima Locomotive Works; Combustion Engineering Company; American Arch Company; Franklin Railway Supply Company

Samuel Gordon Allen (August 24, 1870 – October 16, 1956) was an American lawyer, businessman, and industrialist who specialized in railroad supplies. He founded the Lima Locomotive Works, the Combustion Engineering Company, and the American Arch Company. Allen was also a dog breeder and judge.

== Early life ==
Allen was born in Warren, Pennsylvania on August 24, 1870. His parents were Marie (née Cook) and Orren Cartwright Allen. He attended public schools in Warren, followed by the Maryland Military and Naval Academy. He also graduated from the Pennsylvania State College where he was a member of Phi Gamma Delta fraternity.

After college, Allen studied law. He was admitted to the Pennsylvania Bar on August 24, 1891.

== Career ==
Allen practiced law with his brother, William Harrison Allen, in Warren for nine years, starting in 1891. On January 1, 1900, he began working in the railroad supply business. He worked for the Franklin Air Compressor Company in Franklin, Pennsylvania. In December 1901, he became the general manager of the Franklin Railway Supply Company, later called the Franklin-Balmar Corp. He became the company's vice president in 1902.

In March 1910, Allen co-founded the American Arch Company with Joel S. Coffin (president of the Franklin Railway Supply Company) and served as chairman of its board until 1949. In June 1910, Allen, Coffin, and George L. Borne formed the Locomotive Super-Heater Company, later called the Combustion Engineering Company.

In January 1916, Allen and Coffin purchased and reorganized the Lima Locomotive Works, later called the Baldwin-Lima-Hamilton Works. Also in 1916, Allen replaced Coffin as president of the Franklin Railway Supply Company. During World War I, Allen served in the U.S. Army Ordinance Division as the assistance chief of the production division.

Allen was chairman of the board of the Air Pre-Heater Corp., the Lima Locomotive Works, and the Combustion Engineering Company. He was also associated with the Baldwin Locomotive Works. He was a member of the executive committee of the Superheater Company and was a director of the Franklin Railway Supply Company, the American Brake Shoe and Foundry Company, and the Locomotive Feed Water Heater Company. At the time of his death, he was the honorary chairman of the Franklin-Balmar Corp.

== Personal life ==
Allen married Anna Lewis of Franklin, Pennsylvania on October 14, 1896. They had a daughter who died in April 1900 before her first birthday. They lived in Franklin from 1901 to 1908. After Anna died in October 1940, Allen married Emily Lee Myers of Franklin on January 12, 1946. They lived in Pinehurst, North Carolina and Rye, New York.

He was a director of the Pinehurst Religious Association, the Moore County Hospital, and The Forum in Pinehurst. He was a member of the board of trustees of the Stevens Institute of Technology from 1933 to 1935.

Allen was elected to The Pennsylvania Society in 1902. He belonged to the Lake Placid Club, the Seigniory Club, the Union League Club, and the Westchester County Club. He was a member and president of the Pinehurst Country Club. He belonged to the Military Order of the Loyal Legion of the United States.

Allen raised pointers and setters and was also a judge for pedigreed dog shows, including for the Westminster Kennel Club Dog Show. He also served on the field trial committee of the American Kennel Club.

Allen died of a heart attack at the age of 82 in Pinehurst on October 16, 1956. He was buried in the Oakland Cemetery in Warren, Pennsylvania. Allen left a bequest of $100,000 ($1,156,548 in 2023 money) to both the Pinehurst Religious Association and the Moore County Hospital.
