= Llewellyn Powers =

American politician (1836–1908)

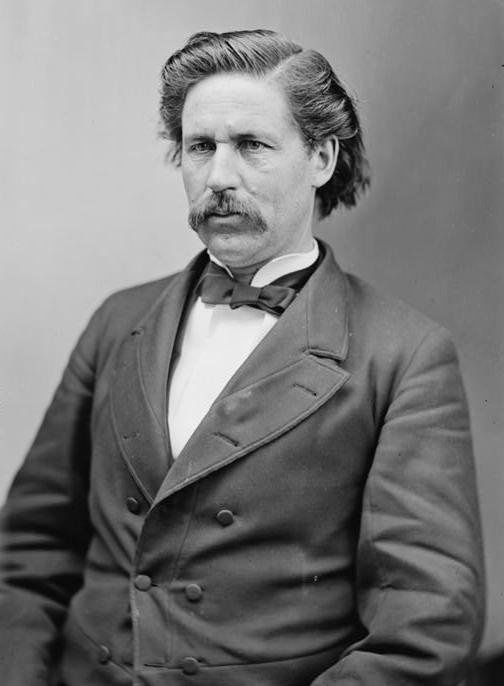

Member of the U.S. House of Representatives from Maine's 4th district
- In office March 4, 1877 – March 3, 1879
- Preceded by: Harris M. Plaisted
- Succeeded by: George W. Ladd
- In office April 8, 1901 – July 28, 1908
- Preceded by: Charles A. Boutelle
- Succeeded by: Frank E. Guernsey

44th Governor of Maine
- In office January 2, 1897 – January 2, 1901
- Preceded by: Henry B. Cleaves
- Succeeded by: John F. Hill

Speaker of the Maine House of Representatives
- In office 1895–1896
- Preceded by: Albert R. Savage
- Succeeded by: Seth L. Larrabee

Member of the Maine House of Representatives
- In office 1873-1876; 1883; 1892; 1895

Personal details
- Born: October 14, 1836 Pittsfield, Maine, US
- Died: July 28, 1908 (aged 71) Houlton, Maine, US
- Resting place: West Pittsfield Cemetery, near Pittsfield, Maine
- Party: Republican
- Education: Colby College
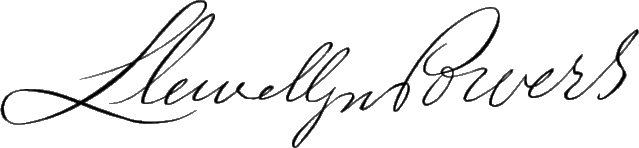
- Signature

Llewellyn Powers (October 14, 1836 – July 28, 1908) was a U.S. representative from Maine and the 44th governor of Maine.

== Biography ==
Born in Pittsfield, Maine, Powers attended the common schools of Pittsfield and St. Albans Academy. He graduated from the Colburn Classical Institute. He attended Colby University in Waterville, Maine, and graduated from the law department of Union University, Albany, New York, in 1860. He was admitted to the bar in Albany, New York, and Somerset, Maine, in 1860 and commenced practice in Houlton, Maine, in January 1861.

He served as prosecuting attorney for Aroostook County from 1864 to 1871. He also served as collector of customs for the district of Aroostook from 1868 to 1872. He served as a member of the Maine House of Representatives, 1873–1876, 1883, 1892, and 1895; during the last term, he served as speaker. While in the Maine House, his bill abolishing capital punishment was considered by the House in 1876 and passed by a vote of 75 to 68, making Maine the third state to abolish the death penalty.

Powers was elected as a Republican to the Forty-fifth Congress (March 4, 1877 – March 3, 1879). He was an unsuccessful candidate for reelection in 1878 to the Forty-sixth Congress. He served as Governor of Maine from 1897 to 1901.

Powers was elected as a Republican to the Fifty-seventh Congress to fill the vacancy caused by the resignation of Charles A. Boutelle. He was reelected to the Fifty-eighth, Fifty-ninth, and Sixtieth Congresses and served from April 8, 1901, until his death in Houlton, Maine, July 28, 1908.

In December 1886, Powers married Martha Averill with whom he had five children. He is buried in West Pittsfield Cemetery, near Pittsfield, Maine.

His brother, Frederick A. Powers, was attorney general of Maine and served on the Maine Supreme Court.

== See also ==
- List of members of the United States Congress who died in office (1900–1949)

Party political offices
Preceded by Henry B. Cleaves	Republican nominee for Governor of Maine; 1896, 1898	Succeeded by John Fremont Hill
U.S. House of Representatives
Preceded by Harris M. Plaisted	Member of the U.S. House of Representatives from Maine's 4th congressional district March 4, 1877 – March 3, 1879	Succeeded by George Washington Ladd
Preceded by Charles A. Boutelle	Member of the U.S. House of Representatives from Maine's 4th congressional district April 8, 1901 – July 28, 1908	Succeeded by Frank E. Guernsey
Political offices
Preceded by Henry B. Cleaves	Governor of Maine; 1897–1901	Succeeded by John Fremont Hill
Preceded by Albert R. Savage	Speaker of the Maine House of Representatives; 1895–1896	Succeeded by Seth L. Larrabee
