= Victor Rosewater =

American politician (1871–1940)

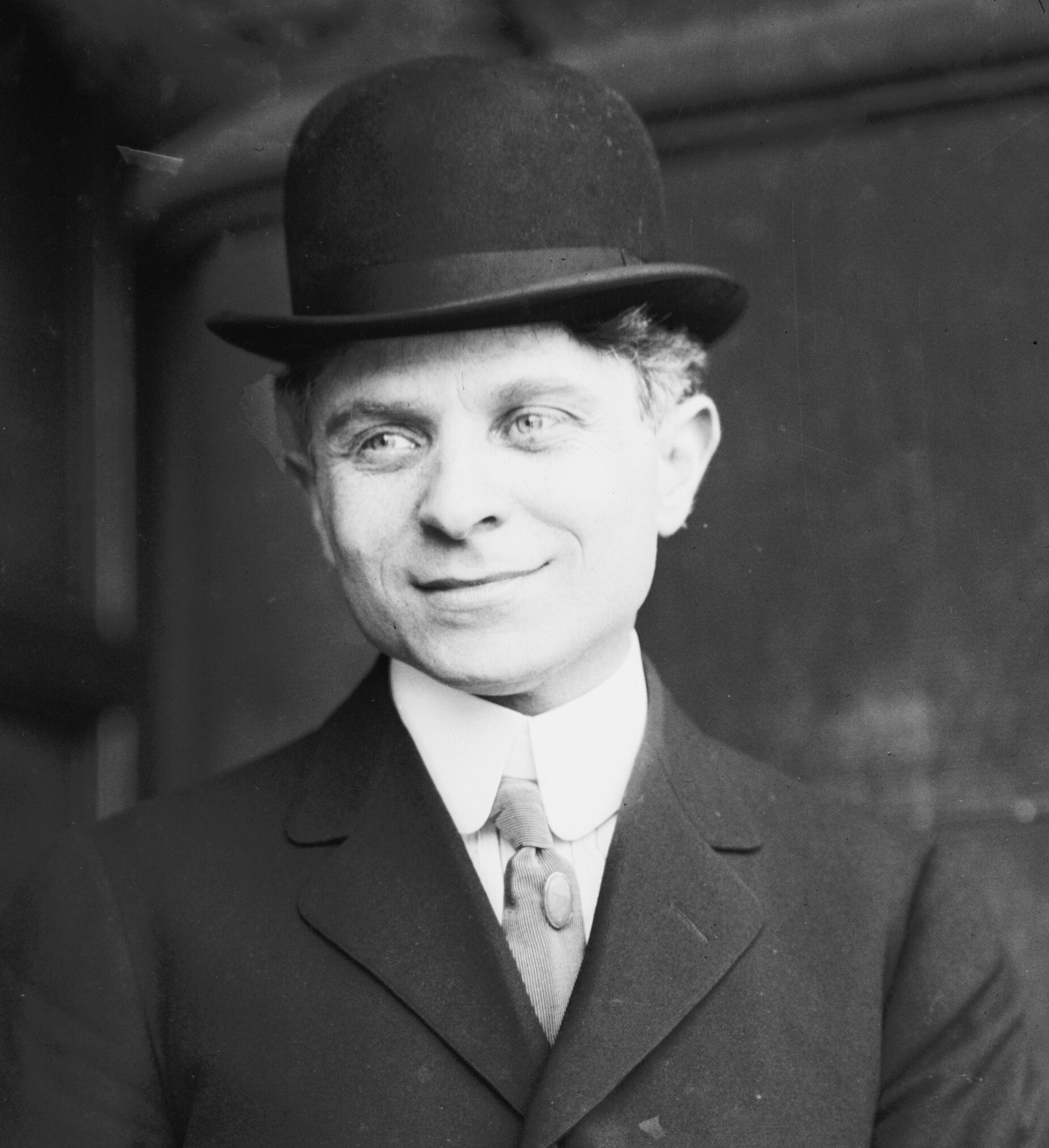

Chair of the Republican National Committee
- In office March 16, 1912 – July 18, 1912
- Preceded by: John Hill
- Succeeded by: Charles D. Hilles

Personal details
- Born: February 13, 1871; Omaha, Nebraska, U.S.
- Died: July 12, 1940 (aged 69); Philadelphia, Pennsylvania, U.S.
- Political party: Republican
- Spouse: Kate Katz (m. 1904)
- Children: 2
- Parent: Edward Rosewater (father)
- Education: Johns Hopkins University; Columbia University (MA, PhD)
- Occupation: Politician; newspaper editor; writer

Victor Rosewater (February 13, 1871 – July 12, 1940) was a Republican politician and newspaper editor from Nebraska. He was chair of the Republican National Committee in 1912. He wrote a number of books on finance and U.S. history.

== Early life ==
Victor Rosewater was born on February 13, 1871, in Omaha, Nebraska, to Edward Rosewater. His father was the founder of the Omaha Bee. Rosewater attended schools in Omaha. He attended Johns Hopkins University until his senior year and then transferred to Columbia University. He graduated from Columbia in 1891 with a Master of Arts. He toured Europe and returned to Columbia and graduated with a PhD in 1893. At Columbia, he studied history, economics and political science. He was a university fellow from 1892 to 1893.

== Career ==
Rosewater joined the staff of the Omaha Bee in 1893. In 1906, Rosewater helped his father run for the U.S. Senate as a Republican, yet unsuccessful against Norris Brown, who was also a Republican. Following his father's death on August 31, 1906, he became managing editor of the Omaha Bee. In 1907, he became editor. Rosewater was regent at the University of Nebraska from 1896 to 1897. He was special lecturer on municipal finance at the University of Wisconsin from 1904. At the time of his death, Rosewater's father was involved in plans for launching the American Jewish Committee, and Victor assumed his father's role, becoming a founder of the AJC.

Rosewater was a member of the Omaha Public Library Board from 1894 to 1905. He did publicity work for the 1898 Trans-Mississippi Exposition in Omaha. He was director of the Omaha Board of Review in 1903. He was a delegate to the National Conference on Conservation of Natural Resources in 1908. In 1908, he was director of publicity in the west for William Howard Taft's campaign for the 1908 United States presidential election. He was delegate-at-large for Nebraska at the 1908 Republican National Convention. He was a member of Republican National Committee, 1908–12, serving as its acting chairman in 1912 and planning the 1912 Republican National Convention. He was a member of the Advisory Labor Committee for the Council of National Defense from 1917 to 1918. He was administrator for Nebraska on the paper and pulp section of the War Industries Board in 1918. He was chairman of the Nebraska Constitutional Convention Survey Committee in 1919.

Rosewater sold the Omaha Bee in 1920. In 1921, he was considered for assistant postmaster by President Warren Harding, but his nomination was blocked by Senator George W. Norris. In 1922, he moved to Philadelphia where he was director of publicity in the west for the Sesquicentennial Exposition. He resigned from the role in 1924, more than a year before the exposition. He remained in Philadelphia and wrote books and lectured at political science institutes.

== Personal life ==
Rosewater married Kate Katz of Baltimore in 1904. They had one son and one daughter, Edward and Mrs. Percy Sax.

Rosewater died of heart disease on July 12, 1940, at his home on Locust Street in Philadelphia.

== Works ==
Rosewater published works included:

- "Laissez-fair" in Palgrave's Dictionary of Political Economy
- Special Assessments, a Study in Municipal Finance
- "Omaha" in Historic Towns of the West
- The Liberty Bell, Its History and Significance
- The History of Co-operative Newsgathering in the United States
- Backstage in 1912 – a book about the 1912 Republican National Convention

Rosewater also wrote an unpublished biography on his father.

Party political offices
Preceded by John Hill	Chair of the Republican National Committee; 1912	Succeeded by Charles D. Hilles
