= Robert R. Wark =

Canadian art historian and curator (1924-2007)

- Born: Robert Rodger Wark; October 7, 1924; Edmonton, Alberta
- Died: June 8, 2007 (aged 82)
- Known for: art historian and curator

Robert R. Wark (7 October 1924 – 8 June 2007) was a Canadian art historian who was curator of The Huntington Library, Art Museum and Botanical Gardens from 1956 to 1990. He is known for editing the authoritative 1959 edition of Joshua Reynolds's Discourses on Art.

== Early life ==
Robert Rodger Wark was born in Edmonton, Alberta. He studied English literature and history at the University of Alberta and at Harvard University, earning an M.A. in art history and then a doctorate in British art specializing in the Georgian period. He taught art history at Harvard and Yale universities for four years before accepting a position at the Huntington in 1956. Despite the demands of the job, he taught art history at Caltech from 1960 to 1990 and at UCLA from 1965 to 1980.

== Career ==
Wark is known for editing the authoritative 1959 edition of Joshua Reynolds's Discourses on art published by Yale University Press.

Wark was curator of the Art Collections at The Huntington Library, Art Museum and Botanical Gardens from 1956 to 1990. His successor was John Murdoch.

== Death ==
Wark died in Edmonton on 8 June 2007.

== Selected publications ==
- Discourses on Art: Sir Joshua Reynolds. Yale University Press, New Haven, 1959. (Editor) New edition: Paul Mellon Centre for Studies in British Art, 1997 ISBN 0300073275
- Early British Drawings in the Huntington Collection 1600-1750. Huntington Library Press, 1969. ISBN 0873280377
- Drawings by Thomas Rowlandson in the Huntington Collection. Huntington Library Press, 1975. ISBN 0873280652
- Charles Doyle's Fairyland. Huntington Library Press, 1980. ASIN: B0000CP3P5
- British Portrait Drawings 1600-1900: Twenty-five Examples from the Huntington Collection. Huntington Library Press, 1982.
- British Landscape Watercolors from Southern California Private Collections. Huntington Library Press, 1986. ISBN 0873280911
- British Landscape Drawings and Watercolors 1750-1850: Twenty-four Examples from The Huntington Collection. Huntington Library Press, 1988. ISBN 0873281160
- Musings of an Art Curator, 1956-1990. 1993.
- Best-Loved Paintings: The Blue Boy [&] Pinkie. Huntington Library Press, 1998. ISBN 0873281705
- The Revolution in Eighteenth-Century Art: Ten British Pictures 1740-1840 Huntington Library Press, 2001. ISBN 0873281926 ASIN: B007PMQ4U6
- The Huntington Art Collections: A Handbook. Huntington Library Press, multiple editions. 8th ed. 1964 ASIN: B000HI5CA8

== See also ==
- Edmond Malone
