= 1898 Maine gubernatorial election =

- September 12, 1898
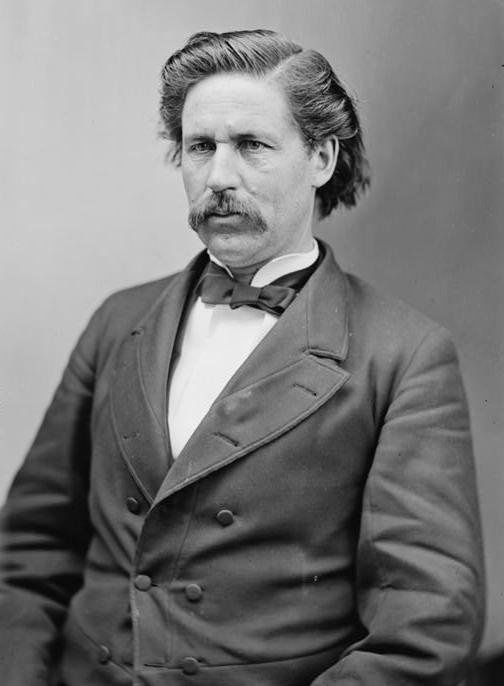

Nominee	Llewellyn Powers	Samuel L. Lord
Party	Republican	Democratic
Popular vote	53,900	29,485
Percentage	62.15%	34.00%
- County results Powers: 50–60% 60–70% 70–80%
Governor before election
Llewellyn Powers
Republican
Elected Governor
Llewellyn Powers
Republican

The 1898 Maine gubernatorial election took place on September 12, 1898.

Incumbent Republican Governor Llewellyn Powers was re-elected to a second term in office, defeating Democratic candidate Samuel L. Lord.

== Results ==
1898 Maine gubernatorial election (Note: Some sources give Lord's total as 28,485. The Maine House Journal records the result as Powers 54,098, Lord 28,485, Ladd 2,326, Gerry 641, Lermond 315, scattering 47.)
Party	Candidate	Votes	%	±%
Republican	Llewellyn Powers (incumbent)	53,900	62.15%	
Democratic	Samuel L. Lord	29,485	34.00%	
Prohibition	Ammi S. Ladd	2,326	2.68%	
Populist	Robert Gerry	649	0.75%	
National Democratic	Erastus Lermond	312	0.36%	
Scattering		48	0.06%	
Majority		24,415	28.15%	
Turnout		86,720		
Republican hold		Swing		
