= John Fremont Hill =

American politician, Maine (1855–1912)

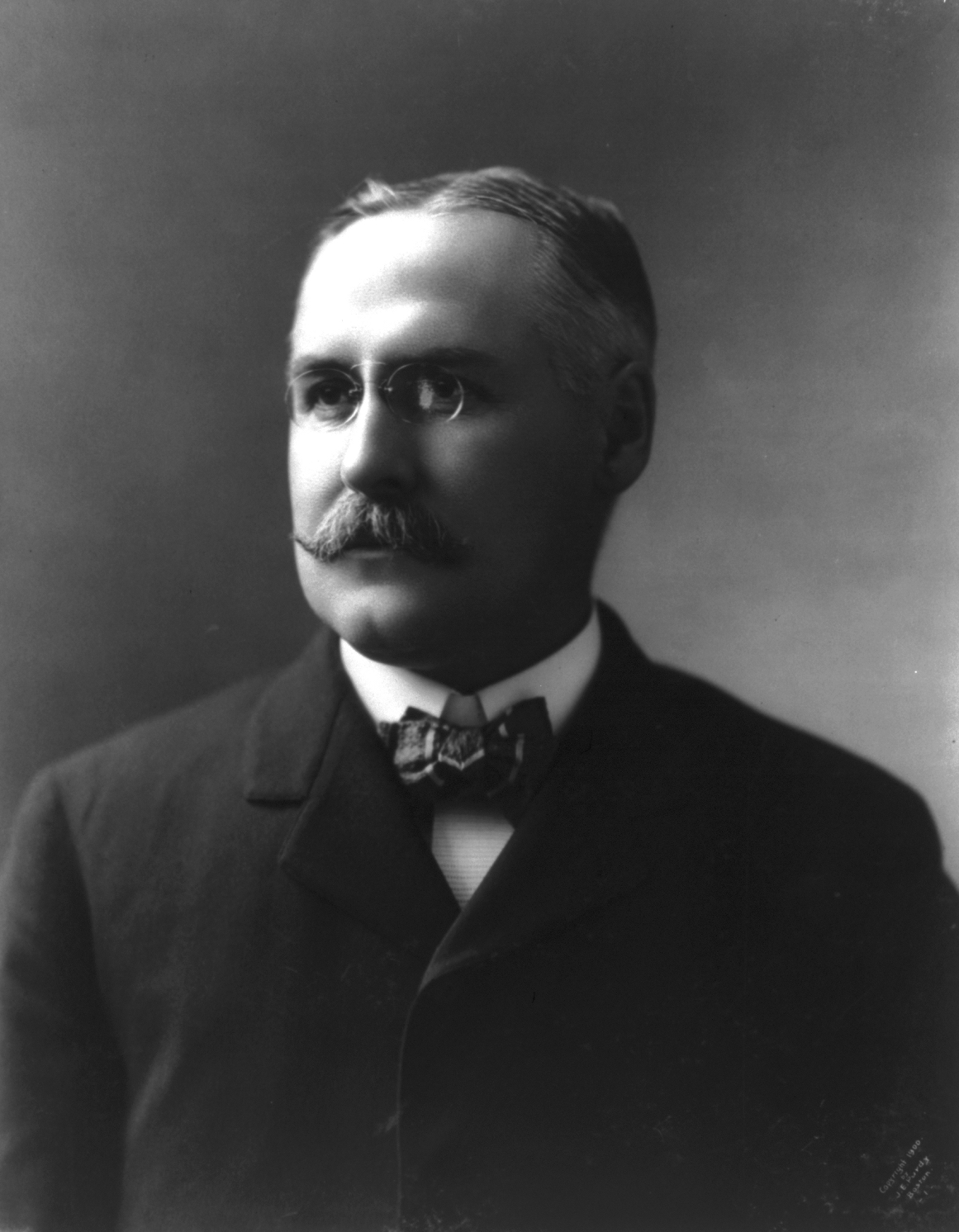

Chair of the Republican National Committee
- In office March 5, 1909 – March 16, 1912; Acting: March 5, 1909 – December 12, 1911
- Preceded by: Frank Hitchcock
- Succeeded by: Victor Rosewater

45th Governor of Maine
- In office January 2, 1901 – January 4, 1905
- Preceded by: Llewellyn Powers
- Succeeded by: William T. Cobb

Personal details
- Born: John Fremont Hill; October 29, 1855 Eliot, Maine, U.S.
- Died: March 16, 1912 (aged 56) Bar Harbor, Maine, U.S.
- Party: Republican
- Spouse(s): Lizzie Vickery (1880–1893); Laura Coleman Ligget (1897–1940)
- Education: Medical School of Maine (MD)

John Fremont Hill (October 29, 1855 – March 16, 1912) was an American businessman and politician. He served in a number of positions in Maine government, including as the 45th governor of Maine from 1901 to 1905.

Hill was born in Eliot, Maine, the son of Miriam (Leighton) and William Hill. He graduated from the Medical School of Maine (Bowdoin College) in 1877 and completed his residency at the Long Island College Hospital Medical School, but practiced medicine only a year. In 1879 he became a member of the law firm (later a publishing house) of J.F. Hill & Co. in Augusta, Maine. He was active in many railroad, steamship, telephone, and banking enterprises.

He was best known as a Republican politician, serving as a member of the Maine House of Representatives in 1888–92, of the Maine Senate from 1892 to 1896, and of the Executive Council in 1898–1899; and he was the 45th governor of Maine from 1901 to 1905. He was acting chairman in 1908–1911, and chairman in 1911–1912, of the Republican National Committee.

== Personal ==
Dr. Hill married Lizzie G. Vickery, daughter of the Hon. Peleg O. Vickery, on May 19, 1880. They had one child, Percy Vickery Hill, born on March 16, 1881. Lizzie died on April 10, 1893. Dr. Hill later married Laura Ligget, née Colman, widow of Hiriam S. Liggett, and daughter of former Secretary of Agriculture Norman Jay Coleman, on April 25, 1897. They had one daughter, Katharine Langdon Hill. Hill died in Eliot, Maine. He is buried at Forest Grove Cemetery in Augusta, Maine.

== Sources ==
Party political offices
Preceded by Llewellyn Powers	Republican nominee for Governor of Maine; 1900, 1902	Succeeded by William T. Cobb
Preceded by Frank Hitchcock	Chair of the Republican National Committee; 1909–1912; Acting: 1909–1911	Succeeded by Victor Rosewater
Political offices
Preceded by Llewellyn Powers	Governor of Maine; 1901–1905	Succeeded by William T. Cobb
