= Charles Bell Burke =

American academic (1867–1953)

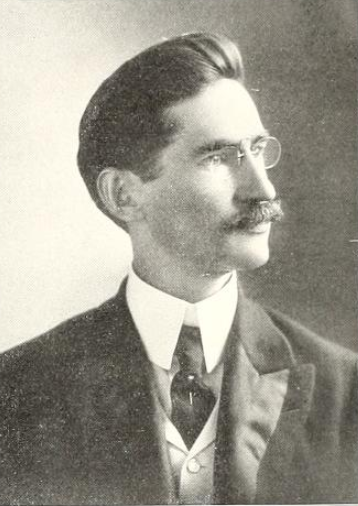
- Charles Bell Burke, 1906
- Born: July 27, 1867; Lauderdale County, Tennessee, US
- Died: May 30, 1953 (aged 85); Daytona Beach, Florida, US

Academic background
- Education: Vanderbilt University, BL, 1889 Harvard University, AB, 1892 Cornell University, Ph.D., 1901
- Thesis: The Open Road (1901)

Academic work
- Discipline: English
- Sub-discipline: English Romantic Era writers
- Institutions: Southwest Baptist University Adelphia College University of Tennessee

Charles Bell Burke (July 27, 1867 – May 30, 1953) was an American academic administrator and university professor. He was head of the English Department at the University of Tennessee from 1923 to 1942. He was also the vice president and a professor of English at Southwestern Baptist University (now Union University).

== Early life and education ==
Burke was born on July 27, 1867 in Lauderdale County, Tennessee. His parents were Elizabeth Jordan Bure and Captain Robert Arnold Burke. His family moved to Dyersburg, Tennessee when he was a child and he attended primary schools there. He then attended the Maryland Military and Naval Academy, graduating in 1885.

Burke gained an interest in literature from his older sister who became a professor of English at Galloway College in Arkansas. He attended Vanderbilt University, graduating with an Bachelor of Literature in 1889. He graduated with an A.B. from Harvard University in 1892.

He received a Ph.D. in English from Cornell University in 1901. His dissertation, “The Open Road,” was the first doctoral dissertation on Walt Whitman. Burke received a two-year fellowship at Cornell. He was said to be "one of the most brilliant English scholars" in the United States.

== Career ==
Burke taught at Chapel Hill Academy in Chapel Hill, Tennessee from 1889 to 1890. He was a professor of English at Southwestern Baptist University (now Union University) from 1892 to 1900. In June 1897, he taught at the second annual National Sunday School Seminary in Jackson, teaching "Studies in Proverbs", "Studies in Ecclesiastes", and "Studies in the Canticles".

In 1902, Burke became the editor of literature for The New International Encyclopedia in New York City. He was an English professor at Adelphi College in Brooklyn from 1902 to 1905. He was offered positions at Harvard and Cornell but turned both down so that he could return to the South.

Burke returned to Southwestern Baptist University as its vice president and a professor of English language and literature in 1905. In 1909, he became an associate professor of English at the University of Tennessee (UT) as well as serving as the headmaster of sub-freshmen. Burke became head of UT's English Department in 1923, a job he kept until he retired. While at UT, Burke funded the Captain Robert A. Burke Award for excellence in prose fiction and the Eleanora R. Burke Award for excellence in expository writing. After 32 years, he retired from the University of Tennessee as a professor emeritus in June 1942.

Burke edited and wrote the introduction to Selected Poems of Christina G. Rossetti, published in 1913 by The McMillan Company. Also in 1913, he taught a course on "The Romantic Age of English Literature" for the Summer School of the South in Knoxville, Tennessee. In 1940, Burke became an advisory editor on biography for the Southern Literary Messenger.

== Honors ==
In November 1942, the University of Tennessee Alumni Association honored Burke at a testimonial dinner, held during homecoming.

The University of Tennessee Department of English commissioned artist Anita Woods to paint a portrait of Burke in 1970. The department unveiled its painting in January 1971.

Burke's papers are archived at the University of Tennessee.

== Personal life ==
Burke married Eleanora Richards of Nashville, Tennessee in 1892. They had a daughter, Eleanor Burke, and a son, Charles Bell Burke Jr., who died in an airplane accident in 1923. Eleanora Burke died in 1936.

After retiring, Burke moved to Daytona Beach, Florida where he lived with his daughter. He died at the age of 85 on May 30, 1953 in Daytona Beach.
