= John Ingamells =

British art historian (1934–2013)

- Born: John Anderson Stuart Ingamells; 12 November 1934; Sussex, England
- Died: 19 November 2013 (aged 79)
- Education: Fitzwilliam College, Cambridge
- Children: 2

John Anderson Stuart Ingamells (12 November 1934 – 19 November 2013) was a British art historian, writer, and former director of the Wallace Collection.

== Early life and education ==
A native of Sussex, Ingamells attended Hastings and Eastbourne Grammar Schools, and subsequently graduated from Fitzwilliam College, Cambridge (then Fitzwilliam House) before undergoing National Service in Cyprus.

== Career ==
Ingamells's career in the arts began in 1959 when he joined York Art Gallery as an art assistant to the curator Hans Hess, and later joined the art department of the National Museum of Wales as assistant keeper in 1963. Ingamells published The Davies Collection of French Art, a catalogue of the National Museum of Wales's French art collection in 1967, and upon its publication returned to York as director of the York Art Gallery. During Ingamells tenure in York he wrote and published articles on the French painter Philippe Mercier, with Robert Raines, and on the Italian portraitist Andrea Soldi for the Walpole Society.

Ingamells joined the Wallace Collection in London as assistant to the collection's director, Terence Hodgkinson, in 1977, before succeeding Hodgkinson as director in 1978. The Wallace Collection did not lend artworks or stage exhibitions in Ingamells initial years as director, and so Ingamell worked on improving the interiors of the museum and revising the Wallace Collection's catalogue. Ingamells joined the Paul Mellon Centre for Studies in British Art after his retirement in 1992. In 1997 Ingamells published A Dictionary of British and Irish Travellers in Italy, 1701-1800, a dictionary of more than 6,000 travellers and artists who had embarked on the Grand Tour. The book arose out of material collected by the art historian Sir Brinsley Ford. He co-edited an edition of the letters of Joshua Reynolds with John Edgcumbe that was published in 2000.

== Personal life ==
Ingamells was married to his second wife, Hazel Wilson, from 1964 to 2012, they had two daughters. Ingamells suffered from cancer at the end of his life. He was a supporter of York City F.C.

== Selected publications ==
- The Davies Collection of French Art (1967)
- The English Episcopal Portrait, 1559-1835 (1972)
- Catalogue of Portraits at Bishopthorpe Palace (1972)
- A Dictionary of British and Irish Travellers in Italy, 1701-1800 (1997)
- Allan Ramsay: A Complete Catalogue of his Paintings (1999) (with Alastair Smart)
- The Letters of Sir Joshua Reynolds. Yale University Press, New Haven, 2000. (Editor with John Ingamells) ISBN 978-0300087338
- Mid-Georgian Portraits in the National Portrait Gallery (2004)
- Dulwich Picture Gallery Collections Volume I: British (2008)
- Later Stuart Portraits 1685-1714 in the National Portrait Gallery (2010)
- Brooks's, 1764-2014 (2013) (with Hugh Johnson and Philip Ziegler)
