= Frank Harris Hitchcock =

American politician (1867–1935)

Frank Hitchcock
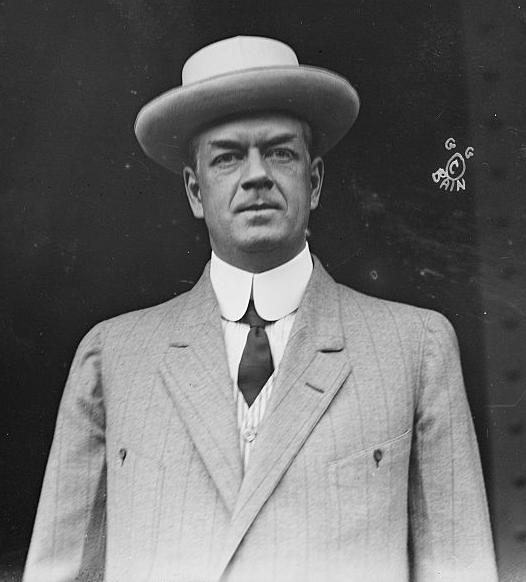
- Hitchcock in 1910

44th United States Postmaster General
- In office March 5, 1909 – March 4, 1913
- President: William Howard Taft
- Preceded by: George Meyer
- Succeeded by: Albert S. Burleson

Chair of the Republican National Committee
- In office July 8, 1908 – March 5, 1909
- Preceded by: Harry New
- Succeeded by: John Hill

Personal details
- Born: Frank Harris Hitchcock; October 5, 1867 Amherst, Ohio, U.S.
- Died: August 5, 1935 (aged 67) Tucson, Arizona, U.S.
- Party: Republican
- Education: Harvard University (BA); George Washington University (LLB)

Frank Harris Hitchcock (October 5, 1867 – August 5, 1935), was chairman of Republican National Committee from 1908 to 1909. He was then Postmaster General of the United States under President William Howard Taft from 1909 to 1913.

== Biography ==
Frank Harris Hitchcock was born in Amherst, Ohio on October 5, 1867.

"He graduated from Harvard in 1891 and the George Washington University Law School in 1894. During his time at Harvard he met Theodore Roosevelt at the Audubon Society, both sharing a passion for the study of birds. Hitchcock credited Roosevelt for his success at the national level: From 1897 to 1905 Hitchcock served in the departments of Agriculture and Commerce. From 1905-08, he was assistant postmaster general."

He is credited with establishing the first U.S. airmail service. As Postmaster General, he made prosecution of mail fraud a top priority, and led a major crackdown on people using the mails to sell shares in worthless companies. He's also credited with starting the US Postal Service's Operation Santa in 1912, instructing local postmasters to let workers and citizens respond to Santa letters that were popping up in post offices.

Hitchcock managed the campaign to nominate Taft for the presidency at the 1908 Republican Convention. Hitchcock's subsequent role as Postmaster General made him the main dispenser of patronage jobs for the Taft administration, giving him control over many delegates at the 1912 Republican Convention and prompting anxieties on the part of Taft and others over rumors that Hitchcock might support Roosevelt that year.

Hitchcock moved to Arizona in 1928 where he invested in mining and was an owner of the Tucson Citizen. He advocated the creation of Catalina Highway and Saguaro National Monument. Frank Harris Hitchcock died in Tucson, Arizona on August 5, 1935.

== Images ==
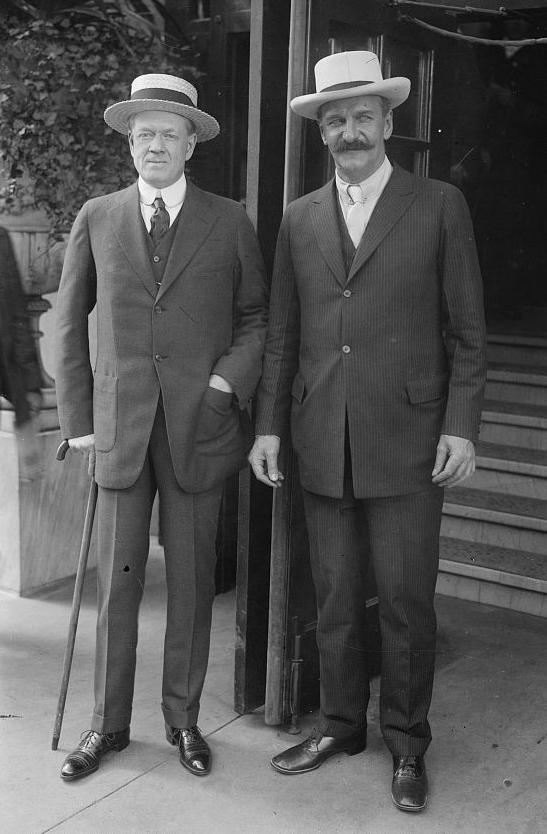
Hitchcock with T. Coleman du Pont

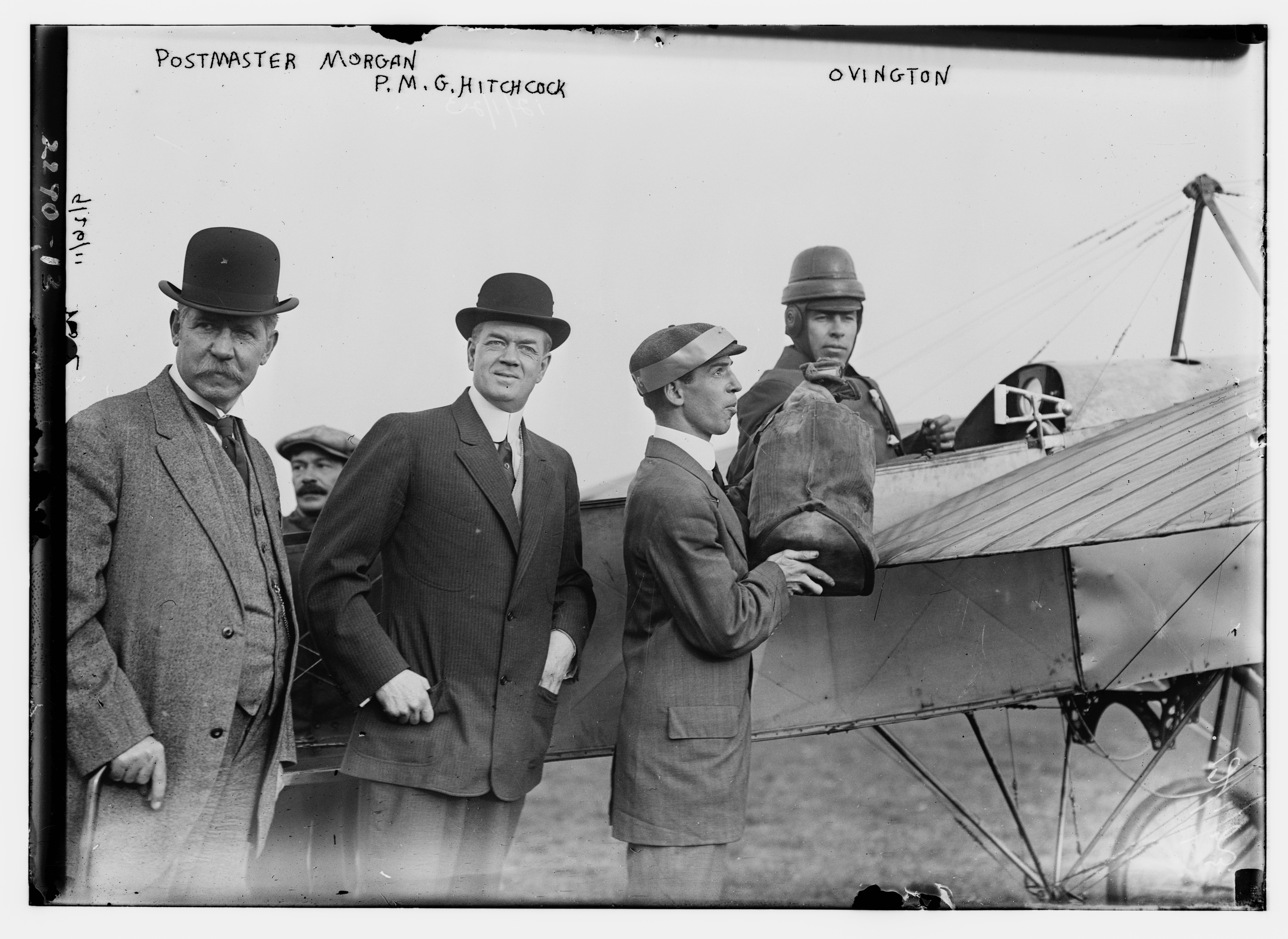
Edward M. Morgan, Frank Harris Hitchcock, and Earle Lewis Ovington in his Blériot XI

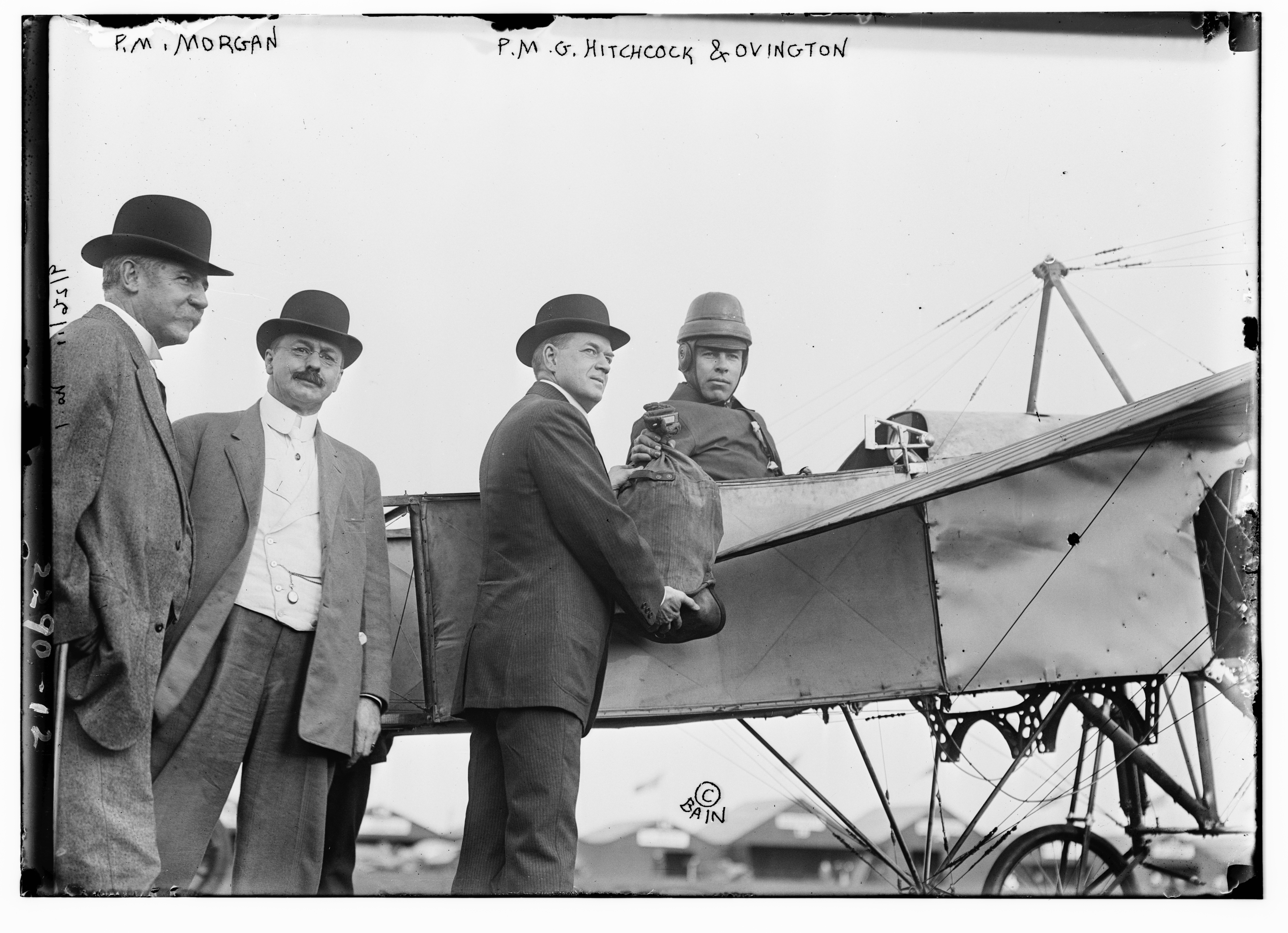
Edward M. Morgan, Frank Harris Hitchcock, and Earle Lewis Ovington in his Blériot XI

Party political offices
Preceded by Harry New	Chair of the Republican National Committee; 1908–1909	Succeeded by John Hill
Political offices
Preceded by George Meyer	United States Postmaster General; 1909–1913	Succeeded by Albert S. Burleson
