= Charles D. Hilles =

American politician (1867–1949)

Charles Hilles
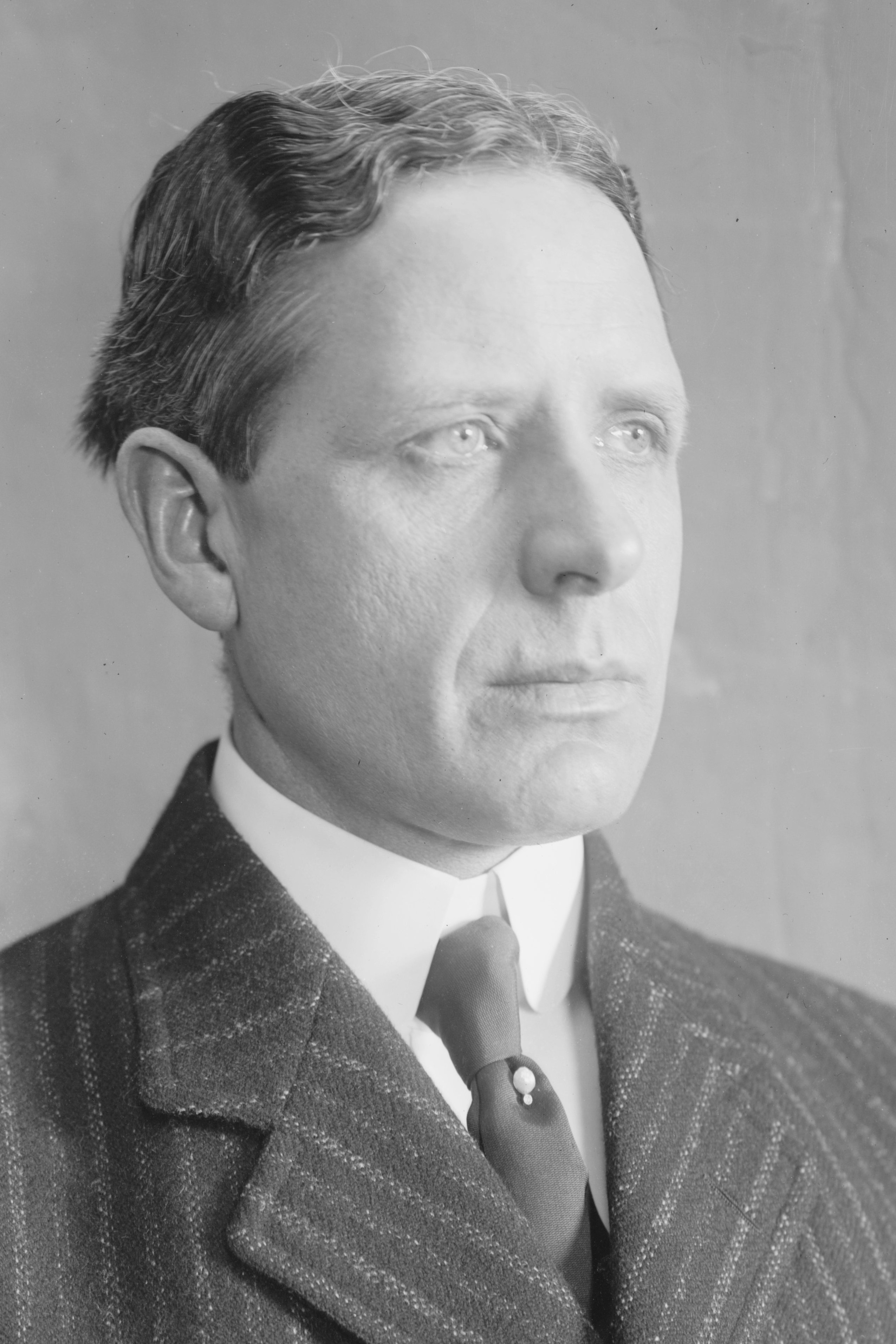

Chair of the Republican National Committee
- In office July 18, 1912 – June 27, 1916
- Preceded by: Victor Rosewater
- Succeeded by: William Wilcox

Secretary to the President
- In office 1911–1912
- President: William Howard Taft
- Preceded by: Charles D. Norton
- Succeeded by: Carmi Thompson

Personal details
- Born: Charles Dewey Hilles; June 23, 1867 Belmont County, Ohio, U.S.
- Died: August 27, 1949 (aged 82) Speonk, New York, U.S.
- Party: Republican

Charles Dewey Hilles (June 23, 1867 – August 27, 1949) was a politician from the U. S. state of New York. He was Assistant Secretary of the Treasury in 1909, resigned in 1911 to become Secretary to the President of the United States under William H. Taft, and served as Chairman of the Republican National Committee.

== Early life ==
Hilles was born in Belmont County, Ohio to Samuel and Elizabeth (Lee) Hilles.

== Personal life ==
In 1896 he married Dollie Bell Whiley. They had three children including English literature scholar Frederick W. Hilles. Charles Hilles was also a member of the Loyal Legion and the Republican Party.

== Career ==
From 1880 to 1902, he was financial officer and superintendent of the Boys' Industrial School of Ohio. From 1902 to 1909 he was superintendent of the New York Juvenile Asylum (now Children's Village), becoming president of this institution. He was Assistant Secretary of the Treasury in 1909, but resigned in 1911 to become private secretary to President William H. Taft, where he served until 1912.

Hilles then served as chairman of the Republican National Committee from 1912 to 1916. He was a New York delegate to the Republican National Conventions of 1916, 1920, 1924, 1928, 1932 and 1940. He served as a regular member of the RNC from New York 1924–38. In 1933 he was a delegate to the New York convention to ratify the 21st Amendment which ended prohibition.

In 1949 Hilles suffered a stroke. He died two months later in Speonk, New York. His remains were cremated. His wife also died the same year.

== Notes ==
Party political offices
Preceded by Victor Rosewater	Chair of the Republican National Committee; 1912–1916	Succeeded by William Wilcox
