= Charles Caldwell McChord =

American lawyer and legislator

Charles C. McChord
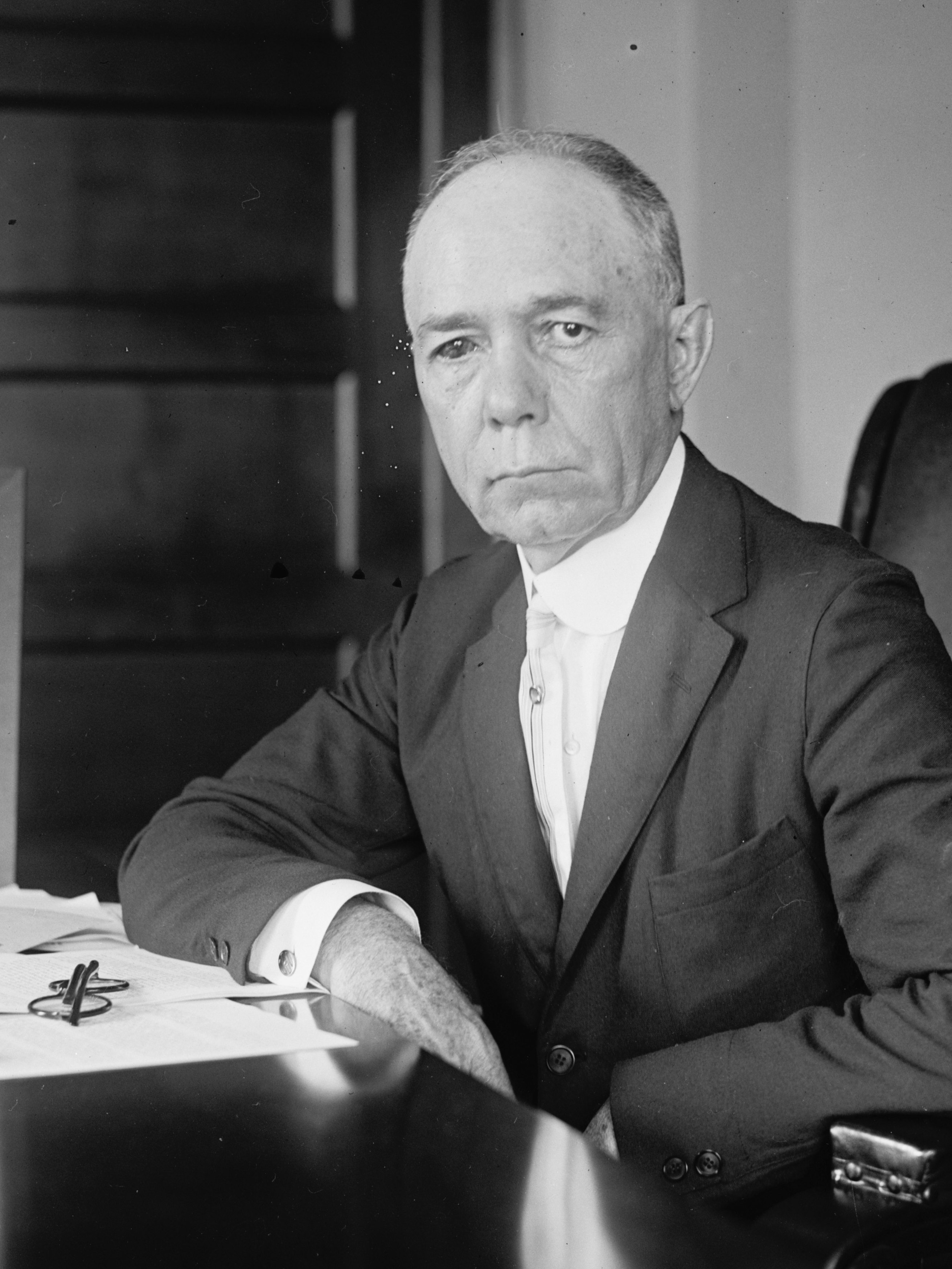

Member of the Kentucky Senate from the 15th district
- In office January 1, 1896 – January 1, 1900
- Preceded by: R. N. Wathen
- Succeeded by: R. Emmett Puryear

Personal details
- Party: Democratic

Charles Caldwell McChord (December 3, 1859 – November 24, 1937) was an American lawyer and legislator who served as chairman of the Interstate Commerce Commission until 1926. He was born in Springfield, Kentucky, to Robert C. and Laura (Hynes) McChord. On January 31, 1888, he married Nellie Grundy. He was a member of the Kentucky State Senate from 1895 to 1899.

In 1918 he served on the Railway Wage Commission.

He died in New York City November 24, 1937.
