= Henry Percival Dodge =

American diplomat

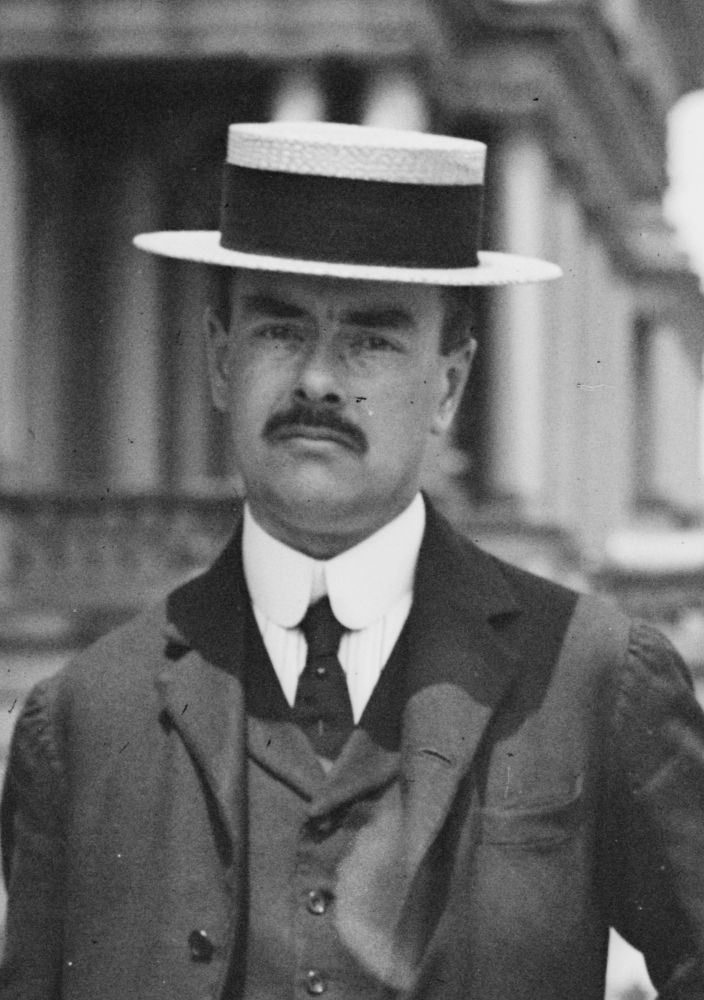
- Henry Percival Dodge, c. 1915

U.S. Minister to Denmark
- In office August 24, 1926 – March 1, 1930
- President: Calvin Coolidge; Herbert Hoover
- Preceded by: John Dyneley Prince
- Succeeded by: Ralph H. Booth

U.S. Minister to Serbs, Croats and Slovenes
- In office October 5, 1919 – March 21, 1926
- President: Woodrow Wilson; Warren G. Harding; Calvin Coolidge
- Preceded by: Inaugural holder
- Succeeded by: John Dyneley Prince

U.S. Minister to Panama
- In office November 9, 1911 – June 10, 1913
- President: William Howard Taft; Woodrow Wilson
- Preceded by: Thomas Cleland Dawson
- Succeeded by: William Jennings Price

U.S. Minister to Morocco
- In office June 9, 1909 – July 10, 1910
- President: William Howard Taft
- Preceded by: Samuel R. Gummeré
- Succeeded by: Fred W. Carpenter

U.S. Minister to Honduras
- In office June 17, 1908 – February 6, 1909
- President: Theodore Roosevelt
- Preceded by: Leslie Combs III
- Succeeded by: Philip Marshall Brown

U.S. Minister to El Salvador
- In office December 31, 1907 – February 6, 1909
- President: Theodore Roosevelt
- Preceded by: William L. Merry
- Succeeded by: William Heimke

Personal details
- Born: January 18, 1870 Boston, Massachusetts
- Died: October 16, 1936 (aged 66) Zurich, Switzerland
- Spouses: Margaret Riché Adams (m. 1903; died 1920) Agnes Page-Brown (m. 1922)
- Children: Alice Lamb Cleaves Dodge
- Parent(s): Henry Cleaves Dodge; Alice Almia Lamb
- Education: Harvard University; Harvard Law School

Henry Percival Dodge (January 18, 1870 – October 16, 1936) was a United States diplomat who served as resident minister in South America, Northern Africa, and Europe for many years.

== Early life ==
Dodge was born in Boston, Massachusetts on January 18, 1870. He was a son of Henry Cleaves Dodge and Alice Almia Lamb. After the death of his mother, his father remarried to Rosalie Cox of Philadelphia.

He graduated with an A.B. degree, magna cum laude, from Harvard University in 1892, followed by an LL.B. degree from Harvard Law School in 1895.

== Career ==
Dodge was admitted to the bar in 1895. From 1897 to 1898, he studied in France, Germany and Italy. His entire career was spent at various posts in the diplomatic service, first serving at the American legation of Berlin as third secretary from 1899 to 1900, followed by second secretary from 1900 to 1902 and secretary from 1902 to 1906. In 1906, he was made the first secretary of the American legation at Tokyo serving until his appointment to South America in 1907.

On July 1, 1907, during a recess of the U.S. Senate, President Theodore Roosevelt concurrently appointed Dodge as the United States Minister to Honduras and El Salvador. He presented his credentials in El Salvador on December 31, 1907, and in Honduras on June 17, 1908, almost a year after his initial appointment. During his term, he was a resident of San Salvador and served both countries until February 6, 1909, when he was recommissioned to El Salvador only.

On May 12, 1909, President William Howard Taft appointed him as Minister to Morocco and was officially received by a representative of Sultan Abd al-Hafid on June 9, 1909. He served until he left his post on July 10, 1910.

In 1910, he was chosen to be the first chief of the U.S. State Department's new Latin American bureau with the responsibility to organize a new unit. President Taft appointed Dodge as the Minister to Panama on July 6, 1911, before presenting his credentials on November 11, 1911. While serving in Panama, he became chairman of the committee supervising Panama's municipal and presidential elections. He continued to serve while Woodrow Wilson was president before leaving his post on June 10, 1913.

During World War I, Dodge was sent to France as a special agent of the State Department to aid the American Ambassador William Graves Sharp. He also helped in the mission to rescue Americans who had been stranded in Europe because of the war.

In 1917, he was sent to Corfu where Serbia's ministry of foreign affairs had established a temporary outpost. After the war ended, President Wilson appointed him Minister to Serbs, Croats and Slovenes on July 17, 1919. He presented his credentials to the Kingdom of the Serbs, Croats, and Slovenes on October 5, 1919. He served during Wilson's presidency, as well as all of Warren G. Harding's presidency and into Calvin Coolidge's term until he left his post on March 21, 1926, after having received his next diplomatic appointment.

On February 23, 1926, President Coolidge appointed Dodge to his final diplomatic post as the U.S. Minister to Denmark. He presented his credentials in Denmark on August 24, 1926, and served until he left his post on March 1, 1930.

=== Niagara Falls peace conference ===
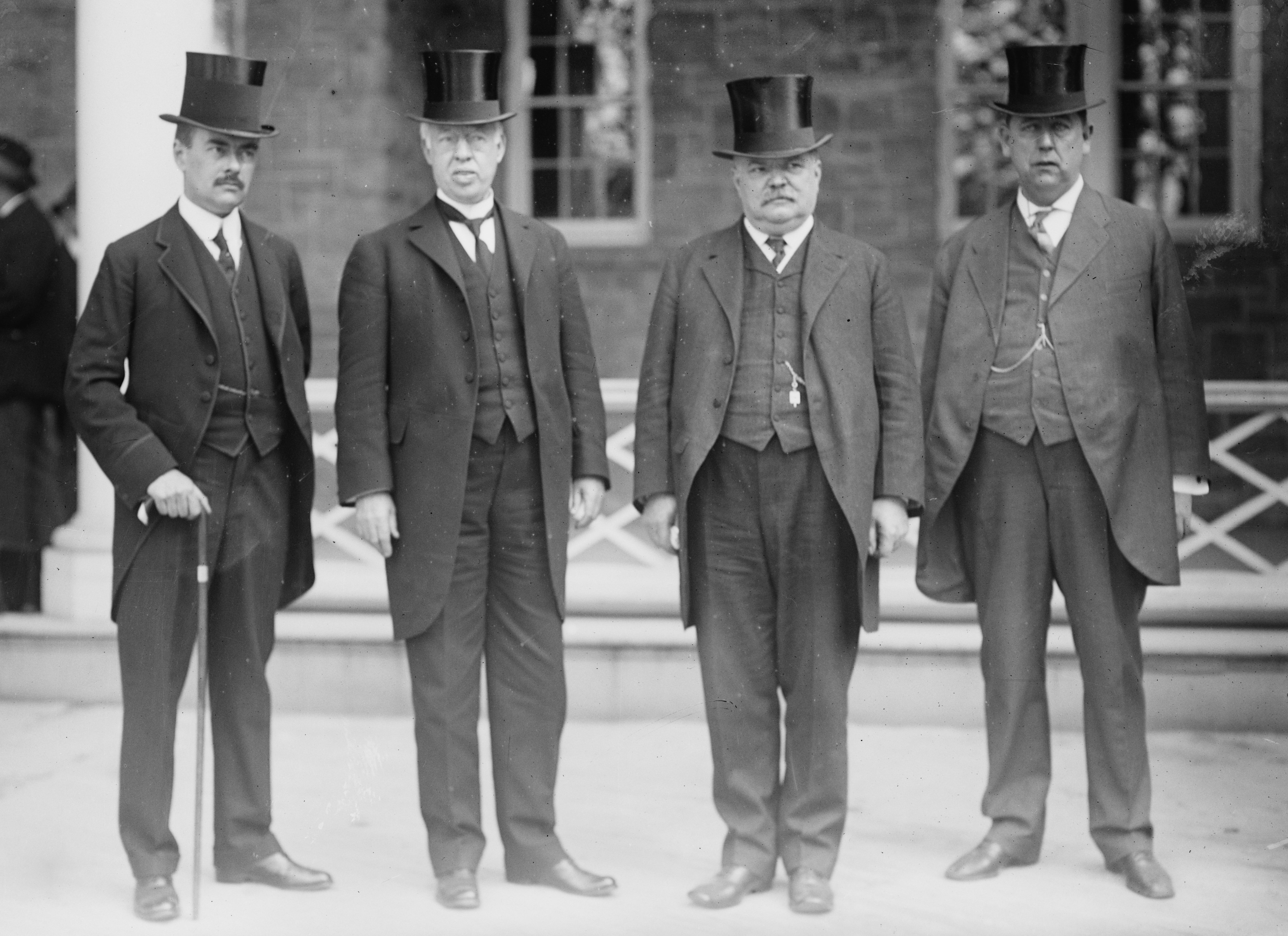
Henry Percival Dodge, Joseph Rucker Lamar, Frederick William Lehmann, and Robert F. Rose at the Niagara Falls peace conference, 1914.

In 1914, Dodge participated in the Niagara Falls peace conference, when representatives from Argentina, Brazil and Chile—the ABC Powers—successfully met in Niagara Falls, Canada, for diplomatic negotiations in order to avoid war between the United States and Mexico, during the era of the Mexican Revolution and following increasing tensions over the Tampico Affair. The Tampico Affair began as a minor incident involving U.S. sailors and Mexican forces loyal to the dictator General Victoriano Huerta during the faction wars phase of the Mexican Revolution, which led to a breakdown of diplomatic relations between the two countries.

The U.S. was represented by Frederick William Lehmann, a former United States Solicitor General and Joseph Rucker Lamar, an Associate Justice of the Supreme Court of the United States. To celebrate the success of the conference, the ABC envoys and the U.S. and Mexican delegates to the conference attended a royal garden party on May 27, 1914, given by the Duke of Connaught, the Governor General of Canada, at the King Edward Hotel.

== Personal life ==
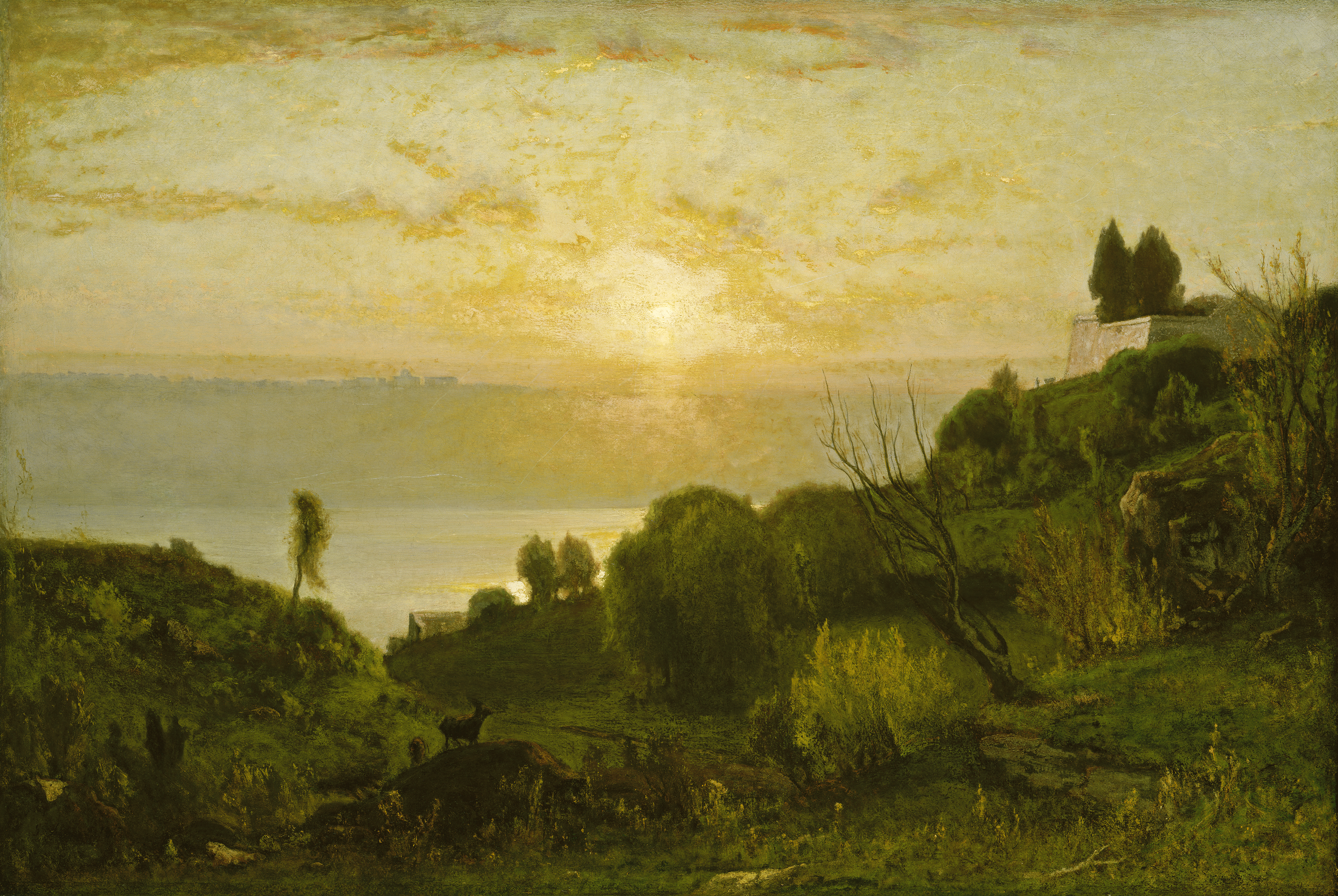
Lake Albano, Sunset, c. 1874, by George Inness. Donated by Dodge's daughter in 1962, in his memory, to the National Gallery of Art.

On February 21, 1903, Dodge was married to Margaret Riché Adams (1876–1920) at Nice, France. Margaret, who was born in Mare Island, California, was a daughter of Rear Admiral James Dexter Adams and his wife, Margaret Jane Phelps (a daughter of Rear Admiral Thomas S. Phelps). Together, they were the parents of Alice Lamb Cleaves Dodge (1905–1985).

Margaret died by falling down an elevator shaft. After her death, he married Agnes Page-Brown in Paris on April 26, 1922. Agnes was a daughter of the late architect Arthur Page-Brown (known for buildings that incorporated classical styles in the Beaux-Arts manner) and the former Lucy Pryor (daughter of Sara Agnes Rice and Justice Roger Atkinson Pryor, a Virginian newspaper editor and politician who served as a General in the Confederate Army).

He died in Zurich, Switzerland on October 16, 1936. His widow died in 1952.
