= Robert F. Rose =

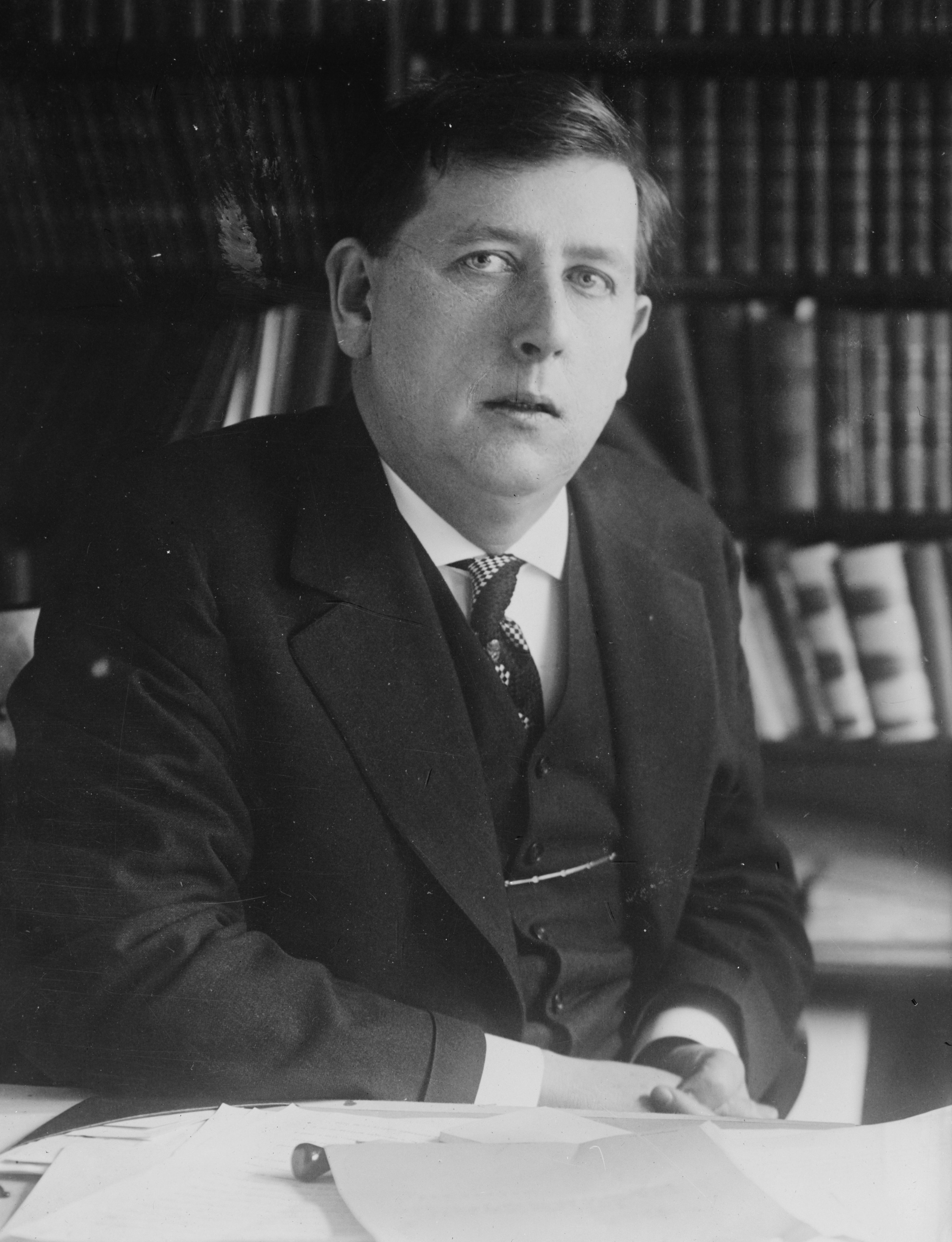
Robert F. Rose, 1915

Robert Forest Rose (1868 – December 19, 1924) was an American journalist who served as Foreign Trade Advisor under U.S. Secretary of State William Jennings Bryan.

== Early life ==
Rose was a native of Darlington, Wisconsin, and had a brother, David S. Rose, in whose office he studied law. The brothers later moved from Darlington to Milwaukee, Wisconsin.

== Career ==
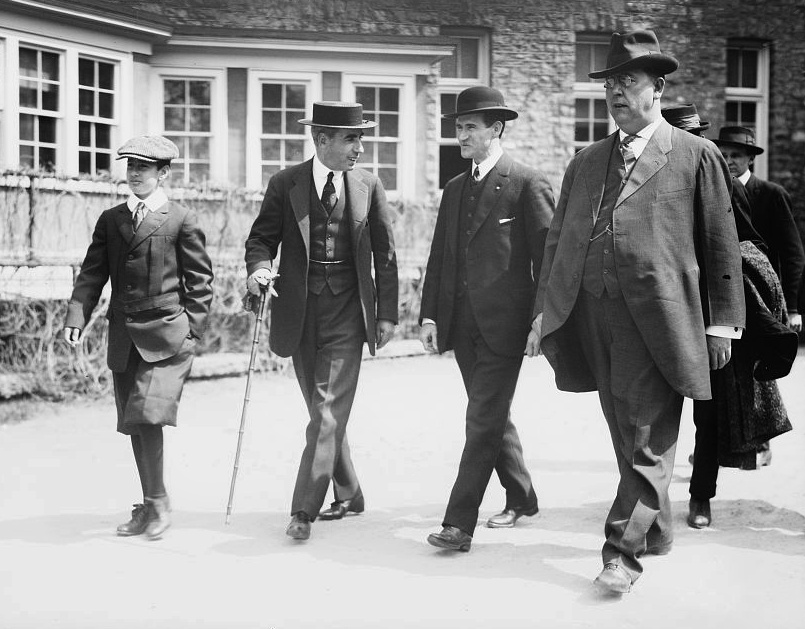
Rómulo Sebastián Naón of Argentina and Rose in Niagara Falls in 1914 at the Niagara Falls peace conference

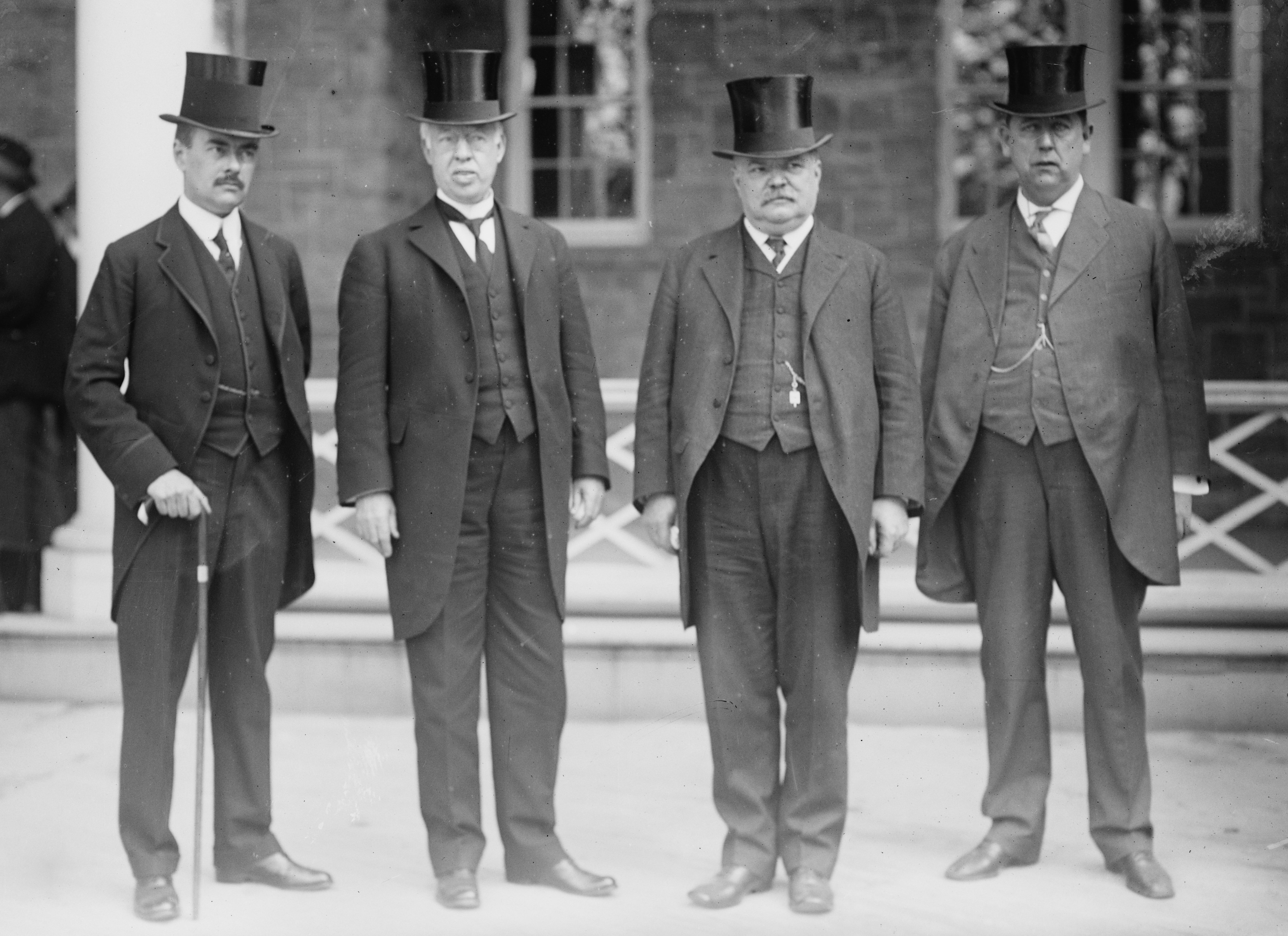
Henry Percival Dodge, and Joseph Rucker Lamar, and Frederick William Lehmann, and Rose at the Niagara Falls peace conference

Beginning in 1889, Rose became a shorthand reporter in Chicago working for twenty years before spending four years in Montana. In 1896, he met William Jennings Bryan during his presidential campaign when he was "assigned to accompany Bryan during his 20,000-mile speech-making trip as correspondent of the Associated Press." During Bryan's 1900 and 1908 presidential campaigns, Rose served as Bryan's private secretary.

On June 5, 1913, early in the Administration of Woodrow Wilson, Rose was appointed Foreign Trade Adviser in Washington, D.C., although he was known in the U.S. State Department as the confidential secretary to Secretary of State Bryan, one of his closest friends. One of the first things he did as Trade Advisor was to obtain a market in Austro-Hungary for cottonseed oil.

=== Niagara Falls peace conference ===
In May 1914, Rose attended the Niagara Falls peace conference, sometimes referred to as the ABC Conference, which met in Niagara Falls, Canada, for diplomatic negotiations in order to avoid war between the United States and Mexico, during the era of the Mexican Revolution. He was one of the U.S. representatives, in addition to the representatives from Argentina, Brazil and Chile—the ABC Powers. In addition to Rose, the U.S. was represented by Frederick William Lehmann, a former United States Solicitor General, and Joseph Rucker Lamar, an Associate Justice of the Supreme Court of the United States. On May 27, 1914, to celebrate their success, the ABC envoys and the U.S. and Mexican delegates to the conference attended a royal garden party given by the Duke of Connaught, the Governor General of Canada at the King Edward Hotel in Toronto.

=== World War I ===
Upon the break out of War in Europe, Rose was tasked with negotiating with foreign countries and obtaining permission for the U.S. to import "sugar beet seed, cyanide, dyestuffs, and other commodities." Along with fellow U.S. Trade Advisor William B. Fleming, Rose broke off negotiations with Sir Richard Frederick Crawford, the commercial attaché of the British Embassy, in May 1915 when the British Order-in-Council stopped their importation.

In August 1915, following the resignation of Secretary Bryan in June 1915 due to his differences with President Wilson over the escalating World War, Rose resigned from the State Department. Reportedly, Secretary Robert Lansing was "reluctant to have him leave the department service, but Mr. Rose had made arrangements to which he was obliged to adhere." He later wrote a course on expert shorthand, published in 1916.

== Personal life ==
Rose was twice married. His first marriage was in 1892 to Kathryn Robson, who died in 1919. He married, secondly, in 1921 to Helen Marshall.

In Washington, the Roses lived at 6803 5th Street. While on vacation with his wife, Rose died in Los Angeles, California on December 19, 1924.
