= Niagara Falls peace conference =

Attempt to keep the US out of the Mexican Revolution

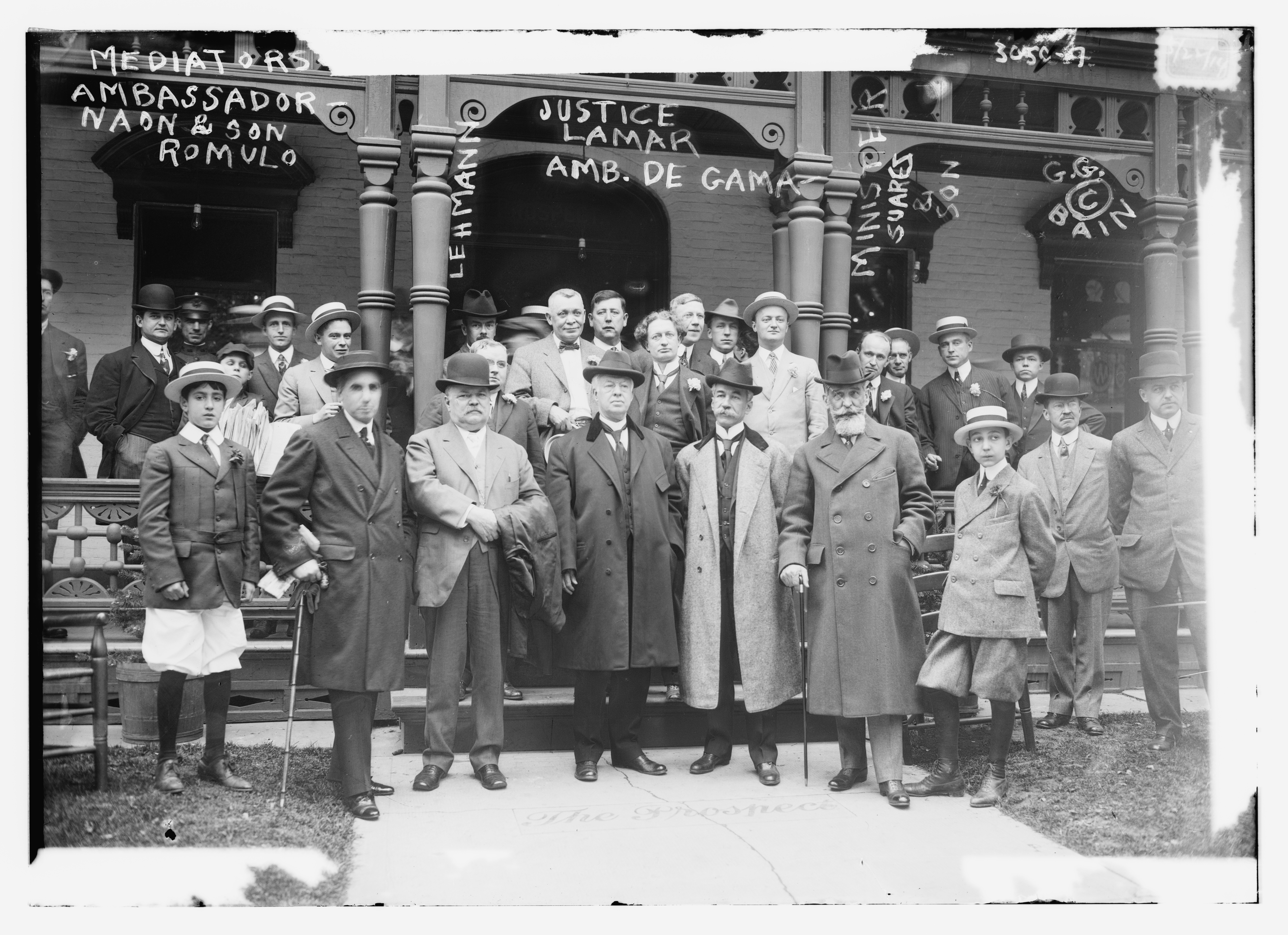
Rómulo Sebastián Naón and his son Rómulo Sebastián Naón, Jr., Frederick William Lehmann, Joseph Rucker Lamar, Domício da Gama, Eduardo Suárez Mujica and his son in Niagara Falls in 1914

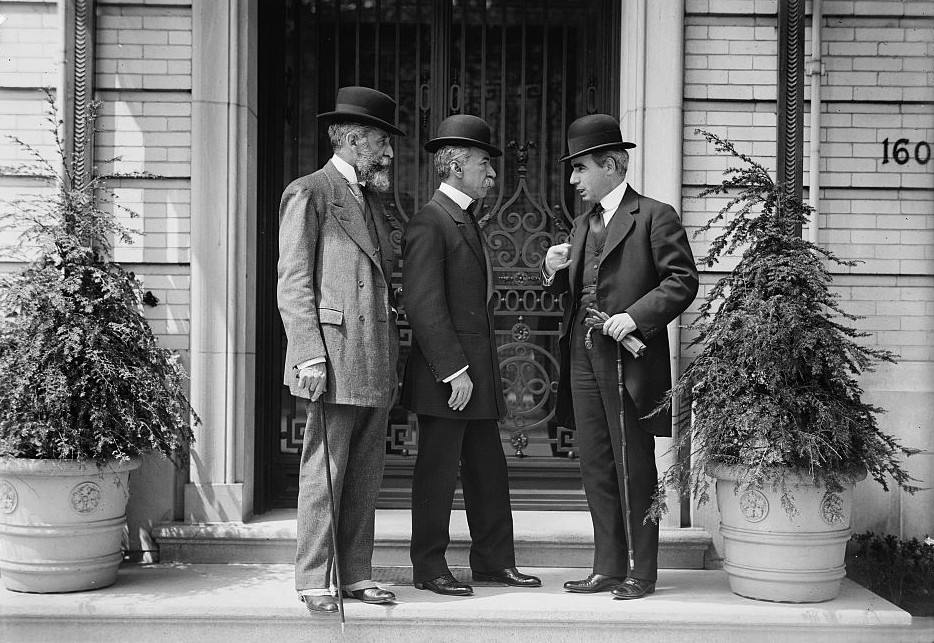
Eduardo Suárez Mujica and Domício da Gama and Romulo S. Naon at the Niagara Falls peace conference in 1914

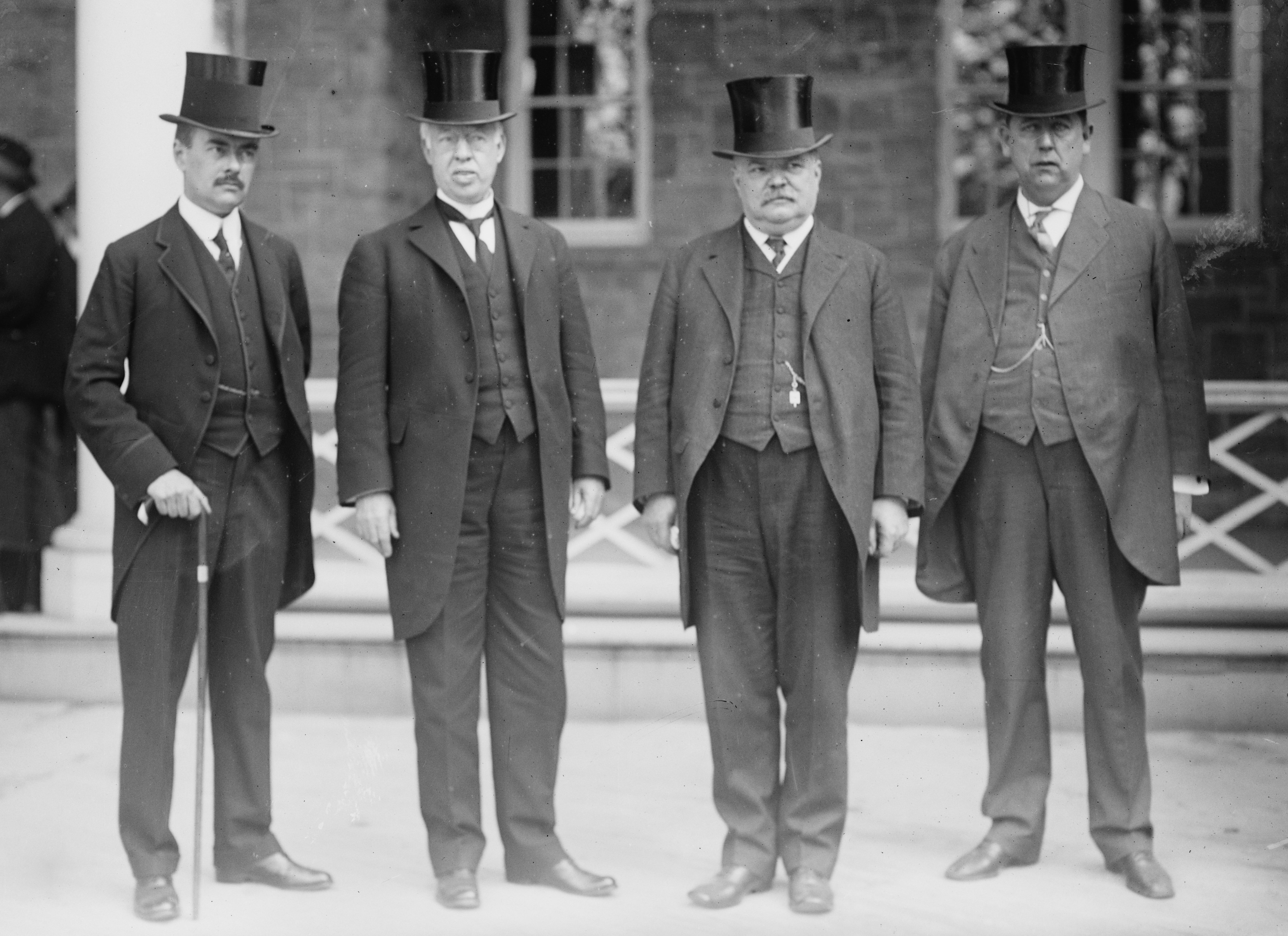
Henry Percival Dodge, and Joseph Rucker Lamar, and Frederick William Lehmann, and Robert F. Rose at the Niagara Falls peace conference in 1914

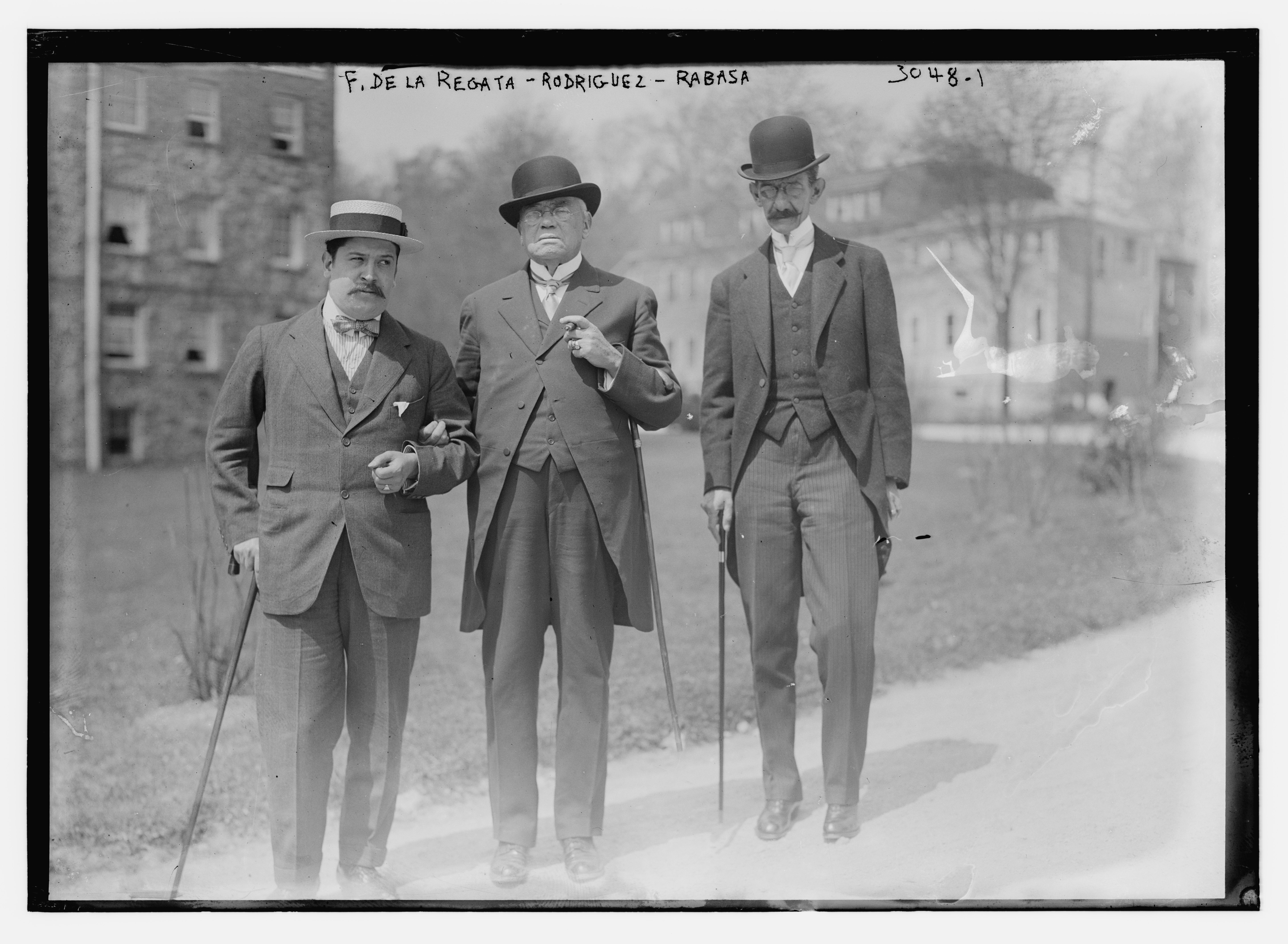
Miguel Fernández de la Regata, Emilio Rabasa and Agustín Rodríguez at the Niagara Falls peace conference in 1914

The Niagara Falls peace conference, sometimes referred to as the ABC Conference, started on May 20, 1914, when representatives from Argentina, Brazil and Chile—the ABC Powers—met in Niagara Falls, Canada, for diplomatic negotiations in order to avoid war between the United States and Mexico, during the era of the Mexican Revolution.

== History ==
There were increasing tensions between the two over the Tampico Affair of April 9, 1914 and the subsequent United States occupation of Veracruz of April 21, 1914 during the Mexican Revolution. The Mexican and U.S. governments had severed all diplomatic channels between one another. At the conference, Domício da Gama represented Brazil, Rómulo Sebastián Naón represented Argentina, and Eduardo Suárez Mujica represented Chile.

The United States was represented by Frederick William Lehmann, a former United States Solicitor General; and Joseph Rucker Lamar, an Associate Justice of the Supreme Court of the United States. Victoriano Huerta's regime was represented by Emilio Rabasa, a prominent Lawyer; Agustín Rodríguez, dean of the Escuela Libre de Derecho; and Luis Elguero, a Mexican Senator. The Constitutionalist faction was represented by Rafael Zubarán Capmany and Luis Cabrera Lobato. On May 27, 1914 to celebrate their success, the ABC envoys and the U.S. and Mexican delegates to the conference attended a royal garden party given by the Duke of Connaught, the Governor General of Canada at the King Edward Hotel in Toronto.

On March 4, 1915, three South American diplomats received the Thanks of Congress and were awarded Congressional Gold Medals (P.L. 63-75, 38 Stat. 1228). The statute reads as follows:

Resolved by the Senate and House of Representatives of the United States of America in Congress assembled, That the thanks of Congress to their excellencies be, and they are hereby, presented to their excellencies Señor [sic] Domício da Gama, Señor Rómulo S. Naón, and Señor Eduardo Suárez for their generous services as mediators in the controversy between the Government of the United States of America and the leaders of the warring parties in the Republic of Mexico. That the President of the United States is hereby authorized and requested to cause to be made and presented to their excellencies Señor Domicio da Gama, Señor Rómulo S. Naón, and Señor Eduardo Suárez suitable gold medals, appropriately inscribed, which shall express the high estimation in which Congress holds the services of these distinguished statesmen, and the Republics which they represent, in the promotion of peace and order in the American continent.

== Attendees ==
- Henry Percival Dodge, American.
- Frederick William Lehmann, American.
- Robert F. Rose, American from the United States Department of State.
- Joseph Rucker Lamar, American.
- Emilio Rabasa, Mexican representing Victoriano Huerta's regime.
- Agustín Rodríguez, Mexican representing Victoriano Huerta's regime.
- Luis Elguero, Mexican representing Victoriano Huerta's regime.
- Miguel Fernández de la Regata, Mexican representing Victoriano Huerta's regime.
- Luis Cabrera Lobato, Mexican representing the Constitutionalist faction.
- Rafael Zubarán Capmany, Mexican representing the Constitutionalist faction.
- Rómulo Sebastián Naón, Argentina.
- Domício da Gama, Brazil.
- Eduardo Suárez Mujica, Chile.

== Images ==
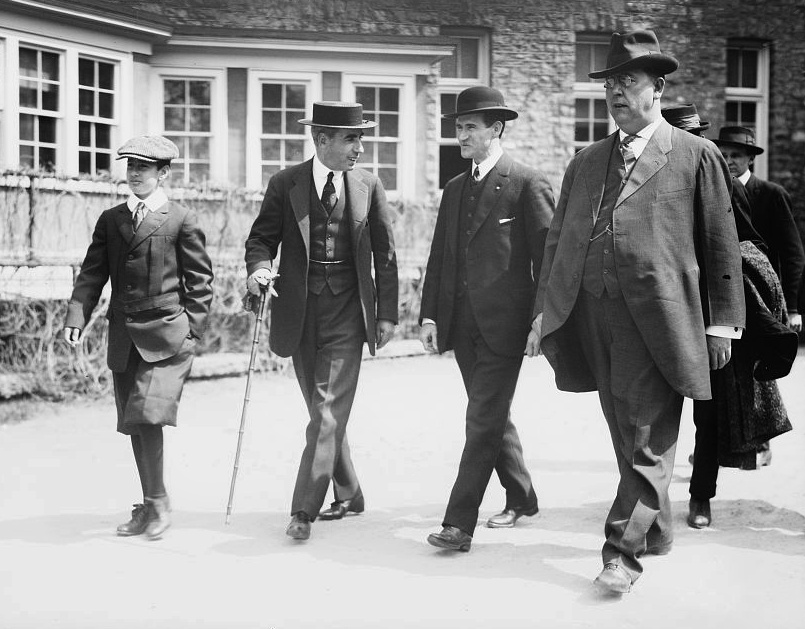
Romulo S. Naon of Argentina and Robert F. Rose at the ABC Conference

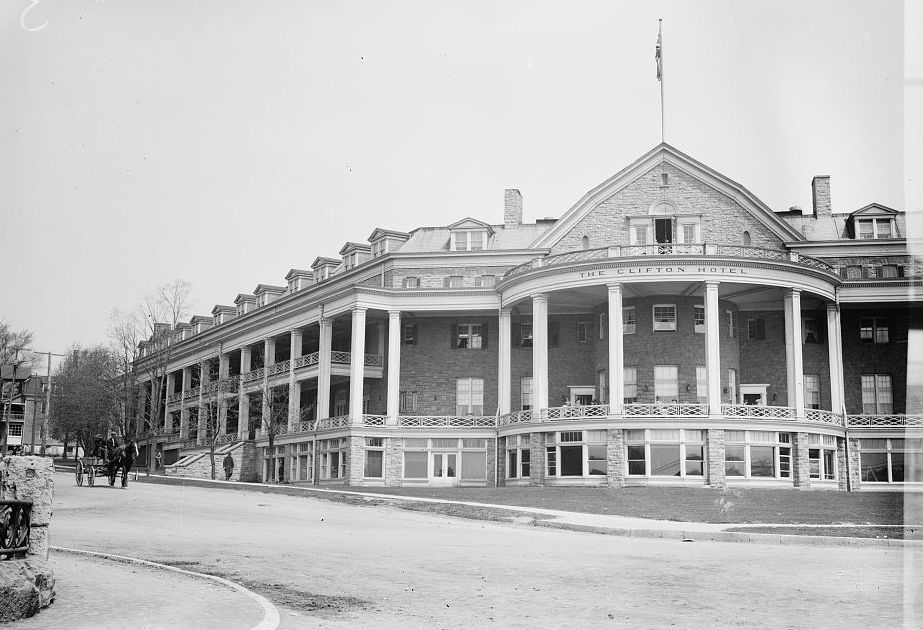
Clifton Hotel, at the ABC Conference
