= ABC countries =

Argentina, Brazil, and Chile

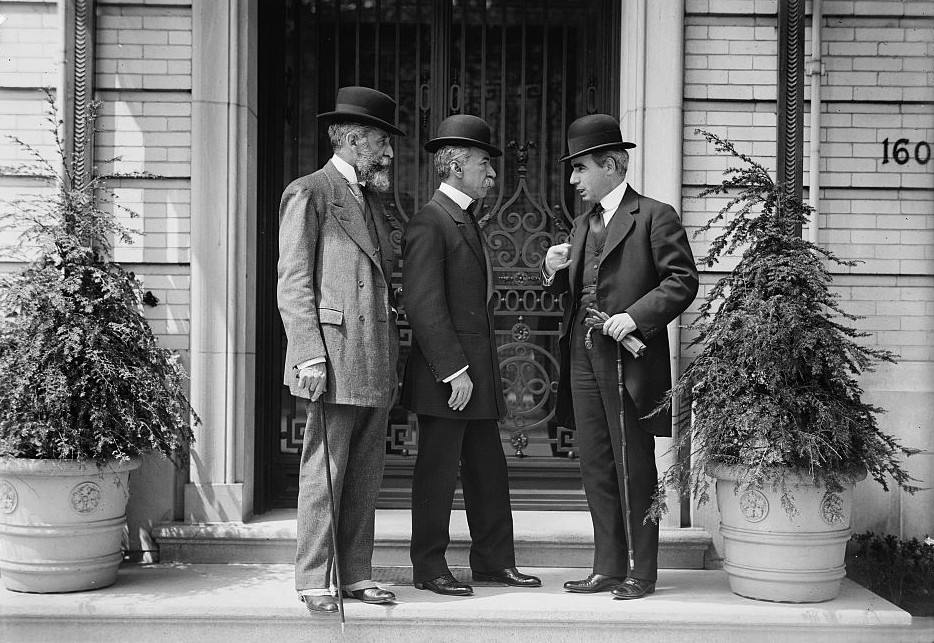
Diplomats Eduardo Suárez Mujica of Chile, Domício da Gama of Brazil and Rómulo S. Naón of Argentina in the Niagara Falls peace conference in 1914

The ABC countries, or ABC powers, are the South American countries of Argentina, Brazil, and Chile, which were seen as the three most powerful, influential and wealthiest countries in South America during the early twentieth century. The term was mostly used in the first half of the 20th century, when the three countries worked together to develop common interests and a coordinated approach to issues in the region with relatively little influence from outside powers.

== History ==
Argentina, Brazil, and Chile in green

During the early 20th century Argentina, Brazil, and Chile engaged in a naval arms race, beginning with Brazil purchasing three dreadnoughts in response to the recently concluded Argentine–Chilean naval arms race.

The Niagara Falls peace conference is the first well-known use of the term "ABC". On May 20, 1914, the three countries met in Niagara Falls, Ontario, Canada, to mediate between the United States and Mexico after increasing tensions over the Tampico Affair, the United States occupation of Veracruz, and developing issues that led to the Mexican Revolution. At the conference, the United States was represented by Frederick William Lehmann, a former United States Solicitor General, and Joseph Rucker Lamar, an Associate Justice of the Supreme Court of the United States.

In 1942, the ABC countries, with the United States, mediated in the peace terms of the Ecuadorian–Peruvian War. This led to the loss of all disputed territory in the Amazon Basin that had been claimed by Ecuador before the war.

== See also ==
- Andean Community
- Argentina–Brazil relations
- Argentina–Chile relations
- Brazil–Chile relations
- Mercosur
- Southern Cone
- South American dreadnought race
