= Domício da Gama =

Brazilian journalist and diplomat (1862–1925)

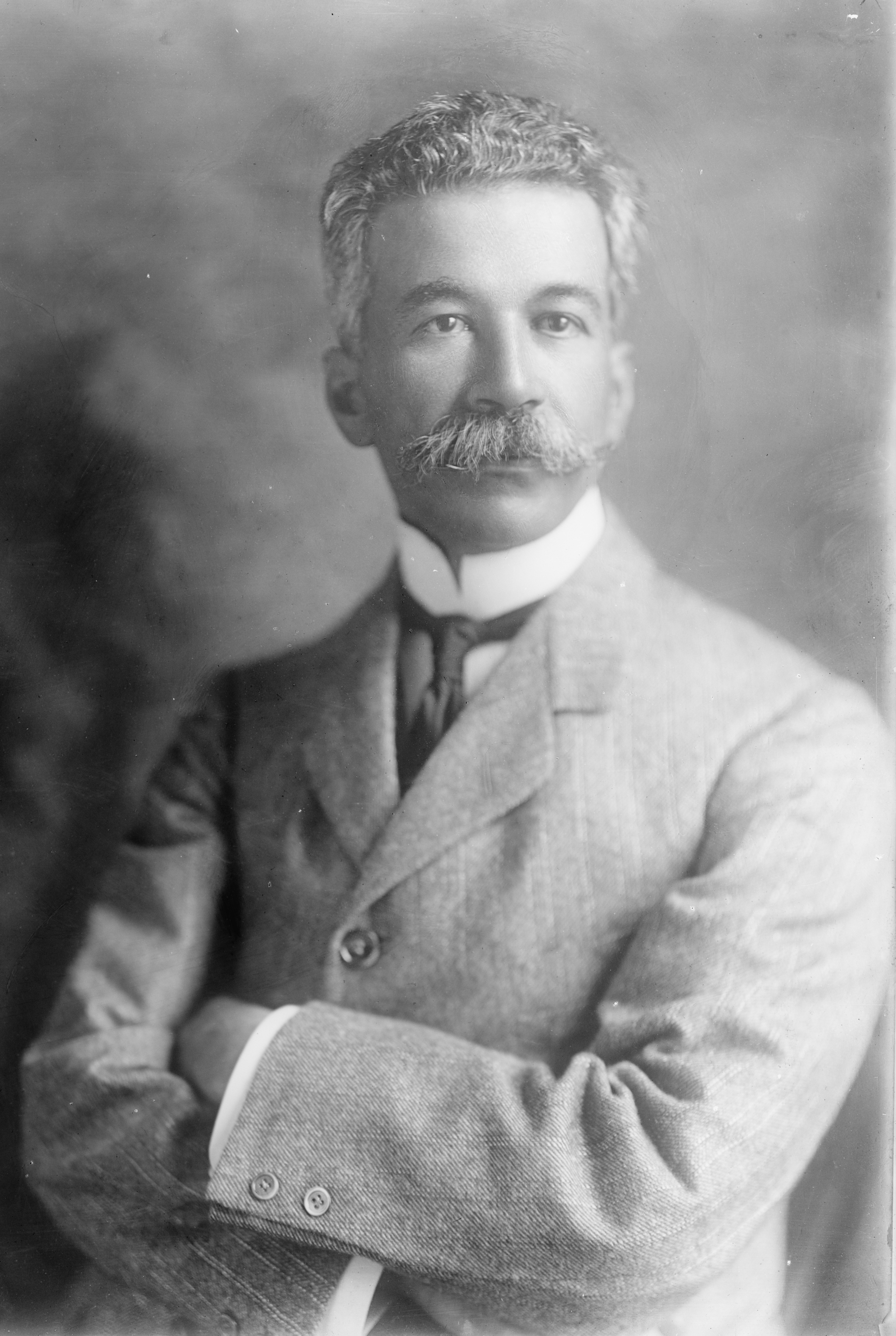
- Gama, 1905–1925 photograph by Harris & Ewing

Minister of Foreign Affairs
- In office November 15, 1918 – July 28, 1919
- President: Delfim Moreira
- Preceded by: Nilo Peçanha
- Succeeded by: Augusto Cochrane de Alencar

Ambassador of Brazil to the United Kingdom
- In office November 8, 1920 – November 13, 1924
- Nominated by: Epitácio Pessoa
- Preceded by: Antônio da Fontoura Xavier
- Succeeded by: Raul Régis de Oliveira

Ambassador of Brazil to the United States
- In office June 10, 1911 – October 22, 1918
- Nominated by: Hermes da Fonseca
- Preceded by: Joaquim Nabuco
- Succeeded by: Augusto Cochrane de Alencar

Ambassador of Brazil to Argentina
- In office July 10, 1908 – August 26, 1910
- Nominated by: Afonso Pena
- Preceded by: Assis Brasil
- Succeeded by: José Pereira da Costa Mota

Ambassador of Brazil to Peru
- In office April 2, 1907 – June 4, 1908
- Nominated by: Afonso Pena
- Preceded by: Eduardo Félix Simão dos Santos Lisboa
- Succeeded by: Augusto Cochrane de Alencar

Chargé d'Affaires of Brazil to Belgium
- In office October 7, 1901 – February 1, 1903
- Nominated by: Rodrigues Alves
- Preceded by: Francisco Xavier da Cunha (as ambassador)
- Succeeded by: José Cordeiro do Rego Barros (as ambassador)

Personal details
- Born: October 23, 1862 Maricá, Rio de Janeiro, Empire of Brazil
- Died: November 8, 1925 (aged 63) Rio de Janeiro, Federal District, Brazil
- Spouse: Elizabeth Bates Volck Hearn (m. 1912)
- Awards: Thanks of Congress; Congressional Gold Medal

Domício da Gama (October 23, 1862 – November 8, 1925) was a Brazilian journalist, diplomat and writer. He was Brazil's ambassador to the United States from 1911 to 1918. In 1918 he became Brazil's minister of Foreign Affairs. From 1919 to 1924, he served as Brazil's ambassador to the United Kingdom.

== Early life ==
De Gama was born on October 23, 1862, in Maricá, Rio de Janeiro, Empire of Brazil. He attended preparatory school in Rio de Janeiro and before entering the Polytechnic School, but did not finish.

== Career ==
He entered the Brazilian foreign diplomatic service; his first commission was the secretary of the Immigration Service, and the contact at that time, the Baron of Rio Branco made him Secretary of the Rio Branco mission which established the boundaries of Brazil and Argentina and the boundary with French Guiana and the British Guyana.

He was Secretary of Legation at the Holy See in 1900 and minister in Lima in 1906, where he instrumental in preparing for the policy of Rio Branco crowned by the Treaty of Petropolis. In 1910, he was Ambassador on special mission representing Brazil in Argentina's independence centenary and the centennial celebrations of Chile.

From 1911 to 1918, he served as Brazil's ambassador to the United States, before becoming Brazil's minister for Foreign Affairs in 1918. After one year however, he was sent to London to be the Ambassador to Great Britain.

=== Honors and awards ===
On March 4, 1915, Gama and two others received the Thanks of Congress and were awarded Congressional Gold Medals (P.L. 63-75, 38 Stat. 1228). The statute reads as follows.

Resolved by the Senate and House of Representatives of the United States of America in Congress assembled, That the thanks of Congress to their excellencies be, and they are hereby, presented to their excellencies Señor Domício da Gama, Señor Rómulo S. Naón, and Señor Eduardo Suárez for their generous services as mediators in the controversy between the Government of the United States of America and the leaders of the warring parties in the Republic of Mexico. That the President of the United States is hereby authorized and requested to cause to be made and presented to their excellencies Señor Domicio da Gama, Señor Rómulo S. Naón, and Señor Eduardo Suárez suitable gold medals, appropriately inscribed, which shall express the high estimation in which Congress holds the services of these distinguished statesmen, and the Republics which they represent, in the promotion of peace and order in the American continent.

== Personal life ==
On November 27, 1912, De Gama was married to American heiress Elizabeth (née Bates) Volck Hearn at 856 Fifth Avenue in New York City (the home of U.S. Steel President Elbert Henry Gary) by Mayor William Jay Gaynor. Elizabeth, the widow of Arthur H. Hearn, was a daughter of Joseph Bates and Amanda Jane (née Bell) Bates.

De Gama died on November 8, 1925, in Rio de Janeiro, Brazil.

== Gallery ==
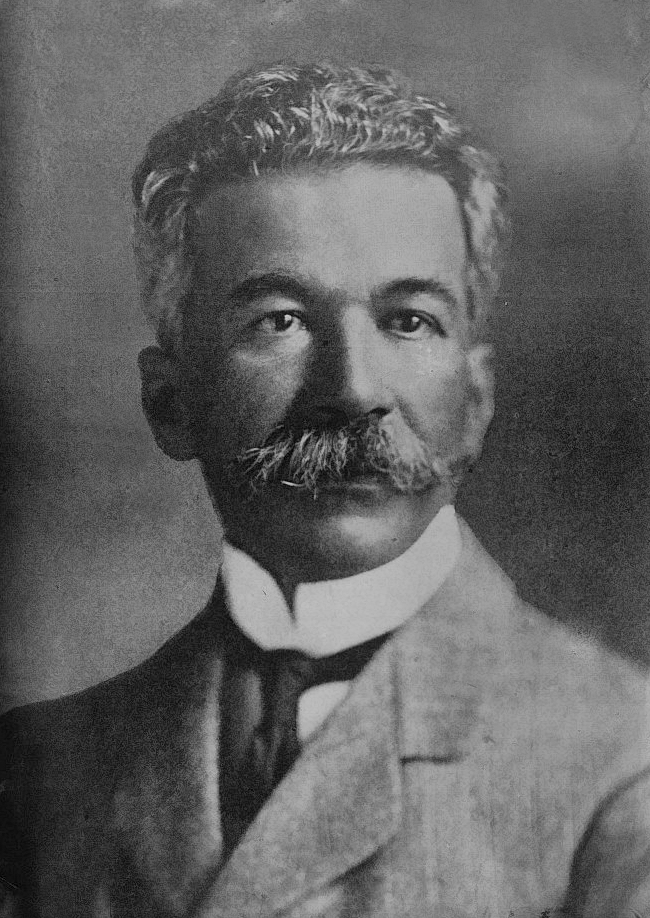
Portrait of Domício da Gama, c. 1910–1915

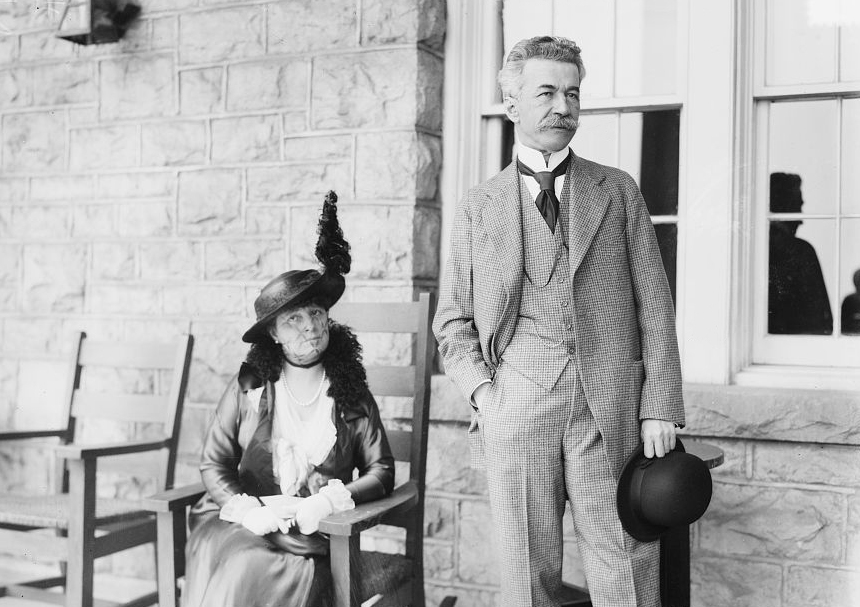
Gama and his wife, Elizabeth Bates Volck Hearn da Gama, at the 1914 Niagara Falls peace conference

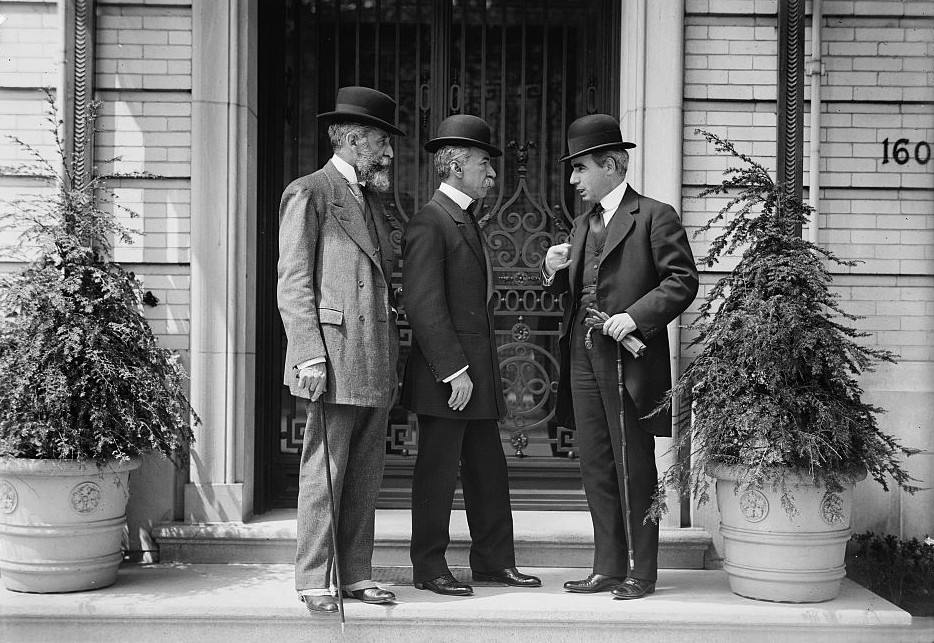
Eduardo Suárez Mujica, da Gama and Rómulo Sebastián Naón at the 1914 Niagara Falls peace conference

== See also ==
- Brazil – United States relations

| Preceded by Raul Pompeia (patron) | Brazilian Academy of Letters – Occupant of the 33th chair 1897–1925 | Succeeded by Fernando Magalhães |
| Preceded by Rui Barbosa | President of the Brazilian Academy of Letters; 1919 | Succeeded by Carlos de Laet |
