= Henry T. Mayo =

Admiral of the U.S. Navy

- Admiral Henry T. Mayo
- Born: December 8, 1856; Burlington, Vermont, U.S.
- Died: February 23, 1937 (aged 80); Portsmouth, New Hampshire, U.S.
- Burial place: Lakeview Cemetery, Burlington, Vermont
- Military career
- Allegiance: United States of America
- Branch: United States Navy
- Service years: 1876–1921
- Rank: Admiral
- Commands: US Atlantic Fleet
- Conflicts: Spanish–American War; Banana Wars; Tampico affair World War I
- Awards: Navy Distinguished Service Medal

Henry Thomas Mayo (8 December 1856 – 23 February 1937) was an admiral of the United States Navy.

Born in Burlington, Vermont on 8 December 1856, Mayo graduated from the United States Naval Academy in 1876 and experienced a variety of naval duties, including coastal survey. During the Spanish–American War he served in the gunboat USS Bennington off the west coast of North America. Captain Mayo commanded Mare Island Naval Shipyard in 1903, before becoming the aide for the Secretary of the Navy Josephus Daniels. He then attended the Naval War College before reassignment to a squadron. About 1909 he was in command of the cruiser USS Albany as she cruised in Central American waters protecting United States citizens and interests as part of the Special Service Squadron. Appointed rear admiral in 1913, he commanded the naval squadron involved in the Tampico incident of 9 April 1914. His demands for vindication of national honor further accentuated the tense relations with Mexico.

Promoted to vice admiral in June 1915, as the new Commander in Chief, Atlantic Fleet, he received the rank of admiral 19 June 1916. For his organization and support of World War I U.S. Naval Forces both in American and European waters, he was awarded the Navy Distinguished Service Medal and various foreign decorations. He evidenced foresight in urging the postwar development of fleet aviation. Admiral Mayo retired 28 February 1921, and, for four years, served as Governor of the Philadelphia Naval Home. He retained his commission as an admiral by a 1930 Act of Congress. He died at Portsmouth, New Hampshire, on 23 February 1937.

== Awards ==
- Distinguished Service Medal
- Navy Expeditionary Medal
- Spanish Campaign Medal
- World War I Victory Medal

== Namesake ==
In 1940, the destroyer USS Mayo (DD-422) was named in his honor.

Military offices
Preceded by Frank F. Fletcher	Commander-in-Chief of the U.S. Atlantic Fleet; 1916–1919	Succeeded by Henry B. Wilson
