= Thanks of Congress =

American government recognitions

The Thanks of Congress is a series of formal resolutions passed by the United States Congress originally to extend the government's formal thanks for significant victories or impressive actions by American military commanders and their troops. Although it began during the American Revolutionary War, the practice peaked during the American Civil War. Similarly, the Confederate Congress also passed resolutions honoring extraordinary performance to individuals or military units.

== Early years ==
During the American Revolution, the official Thanks of Congress from the Continental Congress was often accompanied by a specially struck commemorative gold or silver medal. Among the recipients were George Washington, Horatio Gates, John Eager Howard, John Stark, Baron von Steuben, and Henry Lee (See also List of Congressional Gold Medal recipients).

Other recipients in the early years of the United States include all participants in the Battle of Tippecanoe (1811), Alexander Macomb (War of 1812) (1814), Oliver Hazard Perry (War of 1812) (1814), James Lawrence (War of 1812) (1814), Charles Gratiot in the same war, and Andrew Jackson (epilogue to the War of 1812) (1815), William Henry Harrison (1818) and Zachary Taylor (1847).

== American Civil War ==
During the American Civil War, the Thanks of Congress were joint resolutions of Congress which were published in the Statutes at Large to honor officers from late 1861 through May 1866 for significant victories or impressive actions. A total of thirty officers were named in these acts during the war, fifteen in the Union Army and fifteen in the Union Navy. Two naval officers were immediately promoted after receiving the award, John L. Worden of USS Monitor and William B. Cushing. Because the Thanks of Congress was only awarded to officers, the Medal of Honor was created at this time to honor soldiers in the Army, and over 1,500 men received the medal by the end of the war. Only one officer, General Ulysses S. Grant, received both the Thanks of Congress and a Congressional Gold Medal during the Civil War.

The first citation during the American Civil War recognized "the gallant and patriotic services of the late Brig. Gen. Nathaniel Lyon, and the officers and soldiers under his command at the Battle of Wilson's Creek, 10 Aug. 1861." Admiral David Dixon Porter was honored the most, on four occasions.

=== Civil War recipients ===
Recipient	Date of approval	Military action	Ref.
Nathaniel Lyon and officers and men under his command	December 24, 1861	Wilson's Creek, 1861	
Samuel F. Dupont, and officers, petty-officers, seamen, and marines under his command	February 22, 1862	Port Royal, 1861	
Officers, soldiers, and seamen of the army and navy	February 22, 1862	General award	
Andrew H. Foote, and to the officers and men under his command in the Western Flotilla	March 19, 1862	Fort Henry and Fort Donelson, 1862	
David G. Farragut and officers and men under his command	July 11, 1862	Forts Jackson & St. Philip, 1862	
Louis M. Goldsborough and officers, petty officers, seamen, and marines under his command	July 11, 1862	Roanoke Island, 1862	
John L. Worden and crew of the USS Monitor	July 11, 1862	Hampton Roads, 1862	
Andrew H. Foote	July 19, 1862	Island No. Ten, 1862	
John L. Worden	February 3, 1863	Hampton Roads, 1862	
Charles H. Davis	February 7, 1863	Memphis, 1862	
John A. Dahlgren	February 7, 1863	None	
Stephen C. Rowan	February 7, 1863	Battle of New Bern	
David D. Porter	February 7, 1863	Arkansas Post, 1863	
Silas H. Stringham	February 7, 1863	Forts Hatteras and Clark, 1861	
William S. Rosecrans, and the officers and men under his command	March 3, 1863	Stones River, 1862–1863	
Ulysses S. Grant, and officers and men under his command	December 17, 1863	"The Rebellion"	
John Rodgers	December 23, 1863	Battle of Wassaw Sound	
Nathaniel P. Banks and officers and men under his command	January 28, 1864	Port Hudson, 1863	
Ambrose E. Burnside	January 28, 1864	Knoxville, 1863	
Joseph Hooker, Oliver O. Howard, George G. Meade, and the Army of the Potomac	January 28, 1864	Gettysburg Campaign, 1863	
Cornelius Vanderbilt	January 28, 1864	None	
William T. Sherman, and the officers and soldiers under his command	February 19, 1864	Chattanooga, 1863	
Volunteer soldiers who have reenlisted	March 3, 1864	None	
Cadwalader Ringgold and the officers and crew of the USS Sabine	March 7, 1864	rescue of the USS Governor, 1861 and USS Vermont, 1862	
David D. Porter	April 19, 1864	Vicksburg, 1863	
Joseph Bailey	June 4, 1864	Red River Campaign, 1864	
William B. Cushing and the officers and men who assisted him	December 20, 1864	Sinking of the CSS Albemarle	
John A. Winslow and the officers and men under his command on board the USS Kearsarge	December 20, 1864	Sinking the CSS Alabama, 1863	
William T. Sherman and officers and soldiers of his command	January 19, 1865	Atlanta campaign and March to the Sea, 1864	
David D. Porter, and officers, petty officers, seamen, and marines under his command	January 24, 1865	Fort Fisher, 1865	
Alfred H. Terry, and the officers and men under his command	January 24, 1865	Fort Fisher, 1865	
Philip H. Sheridan	February 9, 1865	Cedar Creek, 1864	
George H. Thomas and army under his command	March 3, 1865	Nashville, 1864	
David G. Farragut and the officers and men under his command	February 10, 1866	Mobile Bay, 1864	
Winfield S. Hancock	April 21, 1866	Gettysburg, 1863	

== Others ==
Later honorees included Admiral of the Navy George Dewey (1898) and Captain Arthur Rostron, for his captaining of the RMS Carpathia (1912). In 1914, the Thanks of Congress were given to three Latin American diplomats: Domício da Gama, Rómulo Sebastián Naón, and Eduardo Suárez Mujica, for their work at the Niagara Falls peace conference which helped avert a war with Mexico. In 1915, they were extended to members of the Isthmian Canal Commission. In 1919 Congress thanked General of the Armies John J. Pershing at a special joint session. In August 1962 Congress thanked General of the Army Douglas MacArthur at a special joint session.

== See also ==
- Congressional Gold Medal
- Medal of Honor
