= William Marshall Bullitt =

American lawyer (1873–1957)

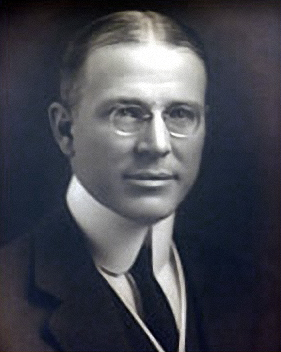

14th Solicitor General of the United States
- In office July 16, 1912 – March 11, 1913
- President: William H. Taft
- Preceded by: Frederick W. Lehmann
- Succeeded by: John W. Davis

Personal details
- Born: March 4, 1873 Louisville, Kentucky, U.S.
- Died: October 3, 1957 (aged 84) Louisville, Kentucky, U.S.
- Party: Republican
- Spouse: Nora Iasigi
- Children: 4
- Education: Princeton University (1894); University of Louisville (1895)

William Marshall Bullitt (March 4, 1873 – October 3, 1957) was an influential lawyer and author who served as Solicitor General of the United States (1912–1913).

== Biography ==
=== Background ===
Bullitt was born to Thomas Walker Bullitt and Annie P. Logan in Louisville, Kentucky on March 4, 1873. His ancestors arrived in Kentucky in the 1700s: the Bullitts, the Walkers, the Christians (relatives of Patrick Henry) and the Logans (descended from United States Supreme Court Chief Justice John Marshall). His father studied law in Philadelphia.

He began his collegiate career at Princeton University, earning a bachelor's degree in 1894. He received a law degree from the University of Louisville in 1895.

=== Early career ===
That same year (1895), Bullitt entered law practice in his hometown of Louisville, where he established himself as a senior member of his firm Bullitt, Dawson & Tarrant. He practiced law there until his death in 1957.

=== Politics ===
Bullitt served as a delegate-at-large at the 1908 Republican National Convention in Chicago. He made speeches on behalf of practically all Louisville Republicans during election time. If he did not think the election officers were performing up to his standards, he proceeded to have them arrested.

Bulliit proved his dedication to President William Howard Taft and the Republican Party by leading Taft's election forces in Kentucky throughout his run for president in 1908.

=== Solicitor General (1912-1913) ===
Taft appointed Bullitt Solicitor General on June 28, 1912.

During his service (1912–1913), Bullitt argued cases involving enforcement of the Sherman Anti-Trust Act on cotton corners, and publicity laws and mail rates regarding newspapers and their circulation.

Other cases he argued in front of the U.S. Supreme Court involved income taxation of federal judicial salaries, taxation of state bonds and municipal securities, the Federal Farm Act, and the Rehabilitation Act of California.

=== After government ===
Bullitt was Kentucky's Republican nominee for Senate in 1914, but was defeated.

For the remainder of his life, he was active not only as a lawyer but also as a banker, academic, and author.

He taught at Harvard University and served as a member of the committee on mathematics there. He became a Fellow of Pierpont Morgan Library and was a member of the Louisville Bar Association, American Math Association, Amateur Astronomy Association, and the American Law Institute.

=== Carnegie Endowment and Alger Hiss ===
In 1933, Bullitt joined the trustees of the Carnegie Endowment for International Peace after being nominated by his successor as solicitor general, John W. Davis. Often critical of Carnegie, he was one of the most vociferous regarding Alger Hiss, first because of the irregular procedure in accepting Hiss and president and then after following HUAC hearings in August 1948. During late November and early December 1948, he wrote a "Factual Review of the Whittaker Chambers-Alger Hiss Controversy," which he soon after had published. With this review, he voted on December 13, 1948, that the trustees accept Hiss's resignation as president but accepted the board's majority vote for leave of absence without pay. Bullitt then attended both trials of Hiss during 1949 and provided Federal prosecutor Thomas Murphy with his review as a legal aid.

== Personal life ==
Bullitt was known to be a very slight man who one Kentuckian remarked could "talk faster than any man in Kentucky."

He was a noted collector of rare mathematics texts. Following a discussion with his friend G. H. Hardy, Bullitt set out to obtain first-edition works by what he considered the twenty-five greatest mathematicians of all time. Following his death, this collection, which grew to include at least 300 volumes by at least sixty different mathematicians, was donated to the University of Louisville. Among the texts in the collection are works by Albert Einstein, Isaac Newton, René Descartes, Galileo, Copernicus, Euclid, Carl Friedrich Gauss, Leonhard Euler, and Gottfried Leibniz.

In November 1956, thieves cracked a wall safe in his Oxmoor home. Police estimated the amount of valuables taken as high as $250,000, of which $77,000 was recovered by the time Bullitt died a year later.

== Death ==
Bullitt died on October 3, 1957, of a heart attack at the age of 84. Bullitt was buried at Oxmoor Cemetery in Kentucky.

== Impact ==
Bullitt argued more than fifty cases in front of the U.S. Supreme Court, some of which were argued while serving as Solicitor General of the United States.

== Publications ==
The following publications appear in two listings in the Library of Congress online catalog:

- Civil and Criminal Codes of Practice of Kentucky and Amendments Enacted Prior to 1899 (1899)
- Civil and Criminal Codes of Practice of Kentucky (1902)
- Louisville Election Contest Cases (1907)
- The Relation of the Individual Policyholder to the Resources of a Mutual Life Insurance Company (1914)
- The Supreme Court of the United States and Unconstitutional Legislation (1924)
- Opinion of Wm. Marshall Bullitt Upon the Disputed Claims between Bethlehem Shipbuilding Corporation, Ltd., and United States Shipping Board Emergency Fleet Corporation (1923)
- Accidental Means (1927)
- Some Unsolved Problems: Address Before the Cincinnati Bar Association, April 26, 1945 (1946)
- Factual Review of the Whittaker Chambers-Alger Hiss Controversy (New York: Lawyers Press, 1949)

Another publication is:

- Distribution of Divisible Surplus in the Light of Present Economic Conditions

Bullitt also edited his own law codes book in 1889 and 1902, called Bullitt's Civil and Criminal Codes of Kentucky.

Party political offices
First	Republican nominee for U.S. Senator from Kentucky (Class 3); 1914	Succeeded by Augustus E. Willson
Legal offices
Preceded by Frederick William Lehmann	Solicitor General; 1912–1913	Succeeded by John W. Davis
