= USS Mayo =

Benson-class destroyer

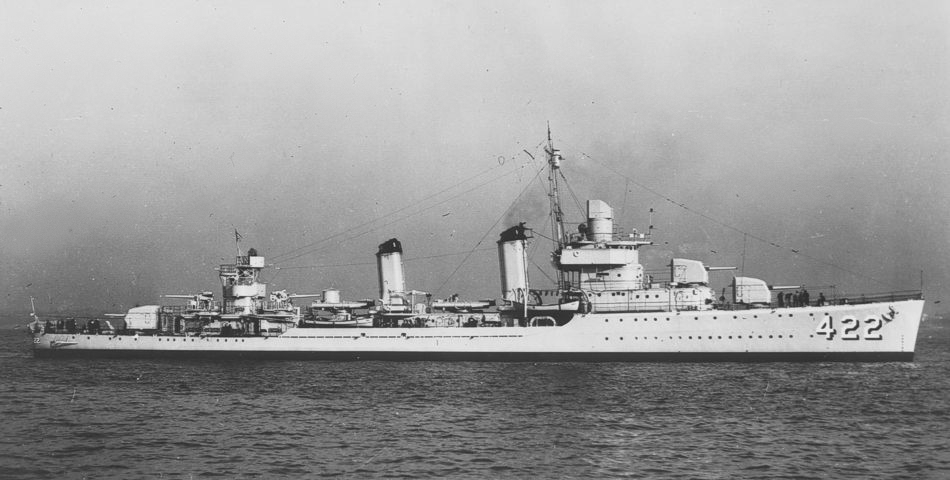
- USS Mayo (DD-422) in 1940

History

United States
- Name: USS Mayo (DD-422)
- Namesake: Admiral Henry Thomas Mayo
- Builder: Bethlehem Shipbuilding Corporation; Fore River, Massachusetts
- Laid down: 16 May 1938
- Launched: 26 March 1940
- Sponsored by: Mrs. C. G. Mayo, daughter-in-law of Admiral Mayo
- Commissioned: 18 September 1940
- Decommissioned: 18 March 1946
- Refit: April–July 1944
- Stricken: 1 December 1971
- Nickname(s): Mighty Mayo, Mayo Maru
- Honors and awards: 2 battle stars, World War II
- Fate: Sold 8 May 1972

General characteristics
- Class & type: Benson-class destroyer
- Displacement: 1620 tons
- Length: 374 ft 4 in (114.10 m)
- Beam: 36 ft 1 in (11.00 m)
- Draft: 11 ft 9 in (3.58 m)
- Speed: 37.5 knots (69.5 km/h; 43.2 mph)
- Complement: 191
- Armament: 5 × 5"/38 (127 mm/38) caliber gun mounts; 8 × 20 mm AA guns; 5 × 21 inch (533 mm) torpedo tubes; 2 × depth charge throwers

USS Mayo (DD-422) was a Benson-class destroyer in the United States Navy during World War II. She was named for Admiral Henry Thomas Mayo.

Mayo was laid down 16 May 1938 by Bethlehem Shipbuilding Corporation, Fore River, Massachusetts; launched 26 March 1940; sponsored by Mrs. C. G. Mayo, daughter-in-law of Admiral Mayo; and commissioned 18 September 1940.

== Service history ==
Mayo joined the expanding Neutrality Patrol after shakedown and escorted Marines to Iceland in July 1941 as they took protective custody of that key island. As President Franklin D. Roosevelt and British Prime Minister Winston Churchill agreed to the Atlantic Charter during the second week in August, Mayo guarded their meeting by patrolling off Naval Station Argentia, Newfoundland.

The formal entrance of the United States into World War II lengthened her convoy assignment beyond the western Atlantic Ocean. Escort of slow merchant convoys out of Boston gave way in summer 1942 to duty with fast troop transports out of New York City. U-boats and bad weather were not the only dangers to be encountered. When Wakefield caught fire 3 September, Mayo swiftly moved alongside the burning ship and removed 247 survivors. With the invasion of North Africa, Mayo appeared at Casablanca, Morocco, 12 November, 4 days after D‑Day, to protect the landing of reinforcements. A retraining period at the end of the year in Casco Bay, Maine, temporarily interrupted convoy assignments.

With DesRon 7, Mayo joined the 8th Fleet in the Mediterranean Sea in August 1943. She gave fire and antiaircraft protection to the beachhead at Salerno, Italy, 8 September and again 22 to 24 January 1944 to the assault beaches at Anzio. At 20:01 on the 24th she hit a mine and the explosion killed seven and wounded 25 of her crew while almost breaking her in two. Despite a gaping hole at the waterline, starboard, she survived a tow back to Naples for a temporary patch, and 3 March began the long tow back to the States. Pulled into New York Navy Yard 5 April, Mayo required 4 months for repairs.

Mayo made a voyage to Trinidad and four to Europe before Germany surrendered. DesRon 7 sortied from New York 5 May 1945 for the western Pacific, and at Pearl Harbor joined fast carrier TG 12.4. Planes from this group struck Wake Island as a training gesture 20 June as the ships sailed on westward. Upon reaching Ulithi, Mayo began a series of escort missions to Okinawa. On 24 August she got underway escorting occupation troops which were landed on Honshū 2 September. She shepherded additional troops from the Philippines and Okinawa before sailing from Yokohama 5 November for San Diego, California and Charleston, South Carolina, arriving 7 December.

She decommissioned 18 March 1946 and went into reserve at Orange, Texas. She was stricken from the Naval Vessel Register on 1 December 1971, sold 8 May 1972 and broken up for scrap.

As of 2025, no other ship in the United States Navy has been named Mayo.

== Convoys escorted ==
| Convoy | Escort Group | Dates | Notes |
|---|---|---|---|
| | task force 19 | 1–7 July 1941 | occupation of Iceland prior to US declaration of war |
| HX 152 | | 30 Sept-9 Oct 1941 | from Newfoundland to Iceland prior to US declaration of war |
| ON 26 | | 20-29 Oct 1941 | from Iceland to Newfoundland prior to US declaration of war |
| HX 160 | | 17-25 Nov 1941 | from Newfoundland to Iceland prior to US declaration of war |
| ON 41 | | 4-14 Dec 1941 | from Iceland to Newfoundland; war declared while escorting convoy |
| HX 167 | | 29 Dec 1941-7 Jan 1942 | from Newfoundland to Iceland |
| ON 55 | | 15-16 Jan 1942 | from Iceland to Newfoundland |
| HX 175 | MOEF group A4 | 15-25 Feb 1942 | from Newfoundland to Northern Ireland |
| ON 73 | MOEF group A4 | 6–16 March 1942 | from Northern Ireland to Newfoundland |
| HX 182 | MOEF group A4 | 30 March-7 April 1942 | from Newfoundland to Northern Ireland |
| ON 86 | MOEF group A4 | 14–26 April 1942 | from Northern Ireland to Newfoundland |
| AT 18 | | 6-17 Aug 1942 | troopships from New York City to Firth of Clyde |

== Awards ==
Mayo received two battle stars for World War II service.

== Bibliography ==
- Davis, Rick E. (2008). "The Unique Armament and Configuration of Mayo (DD-422) and Plunkett (DD-431)". Warship International. XLV (4): 317–328. ISSN 0043-0374.
