= Clifton Hotel (Canada) =

Former historic hotel in Niagara Falls, Ontario, Canada

Coordinates: 43.09082°N 79.07104°W

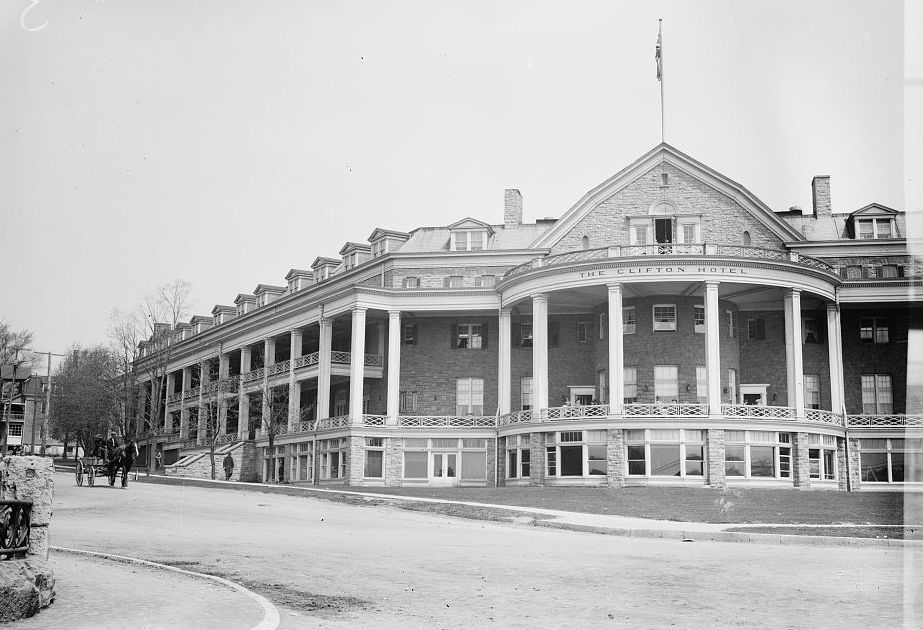
Clifton Hotel in 1914

The Clifton Hotel was a historic hotel in Niagara Falls, Ontario, Canada. It was the site of the 1914 Niagara Falls Peace Conference. It burned down on December 31, 1932.

== History ==
The Clifton Hotel was last owned by "Clifton Hotel Company, Ltd.", a subsidiary of Niagara Falls businessman Frank A. Dudley's United Hotels Company of America until it was destroyed by fire on December 31, 1932. At the time of the fire, the site had been home to hotels for more than a century, including a previous Clifton Hotel that was also lost to a fire in 1898. The loss in 1933 was estimated at $1 million (equivalent to $24,290,000 in 2024).

Harry Oakes, a mining millionaire bought the property and presented it to the Niagara Parks Commission. Oakes Garden Theater was built on the site and opened in September 1937, as part of a plan to beautify the entrance into Canada at the Honeymoon Bridge.

== Significance ==
The hotel was the site of the 1914 Niagara Falls Peace Conference. In addition, the hotel hosted the King George V and Queen Mary of England in 1901, when he was the Prince of Wales, as well as King Albert and Queen Elisabeth of Belgium.
