= Ralph H. Booth =

Ralph Harman Booth (September 29, 1873, Toronto, Canada – June 20, 1931, Salzburg, Austria) was a non-career appointee who served as the American Envoy Extraordinary and Minister Plenipotentiary to Denmark (1930–1931), appointed by President Herbert Hoover. Booth died in office at the age of 57. His professional background was in banking and journalism, as Secretary of the Chicago Journal from 1895 to 1904, cashier and business manager (1892–1904) for the Detroit Tribune, and Vice President of the Associated Press, 1917–18. He began his career with the Detroit National Bank in 1888.

Booth married Myrtle Mary Batterman (1879–1951) on May 23, 1906, and they had two children.

Booth was an important donor to the Detroit Institute of Arts and served as its president from 1917 to 1919 and then president of its governing body, the Arts Commission of the City of Detroit, from 1919 to 1930. In the 1940s, eight paintings from the family's collection were donated to the National Gallery of Art. David E. Finley, Director of the National Gallery of Art, proclaimed that the paintings by Italian and German artists of the fifteenth and sixteenth centuries "are among the most important works of art in private possession in this country."
