= Frederick William Lehmann =

American lawyer (1853–1931)

Frederick W. Lehmann
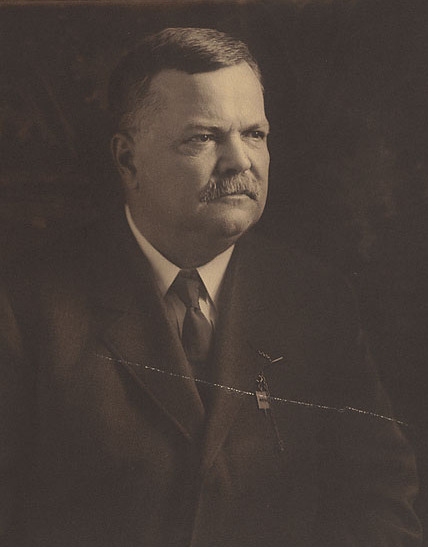
- Portrait by J. C. Strauss

13th Solicitor General of the United States
- In office December 12, 1910 – July 15, 1912
- President: William Howard Taft
- Preceded by: Lloyd Wheaton Bowers
- Succeeded by: William Marshall Bullitt

Personal details
- Born: February 28, 1853 Prussia
- Died: September 12, 1931 (aged 78)
- Party: Democratic
- Occupation: Lawyer

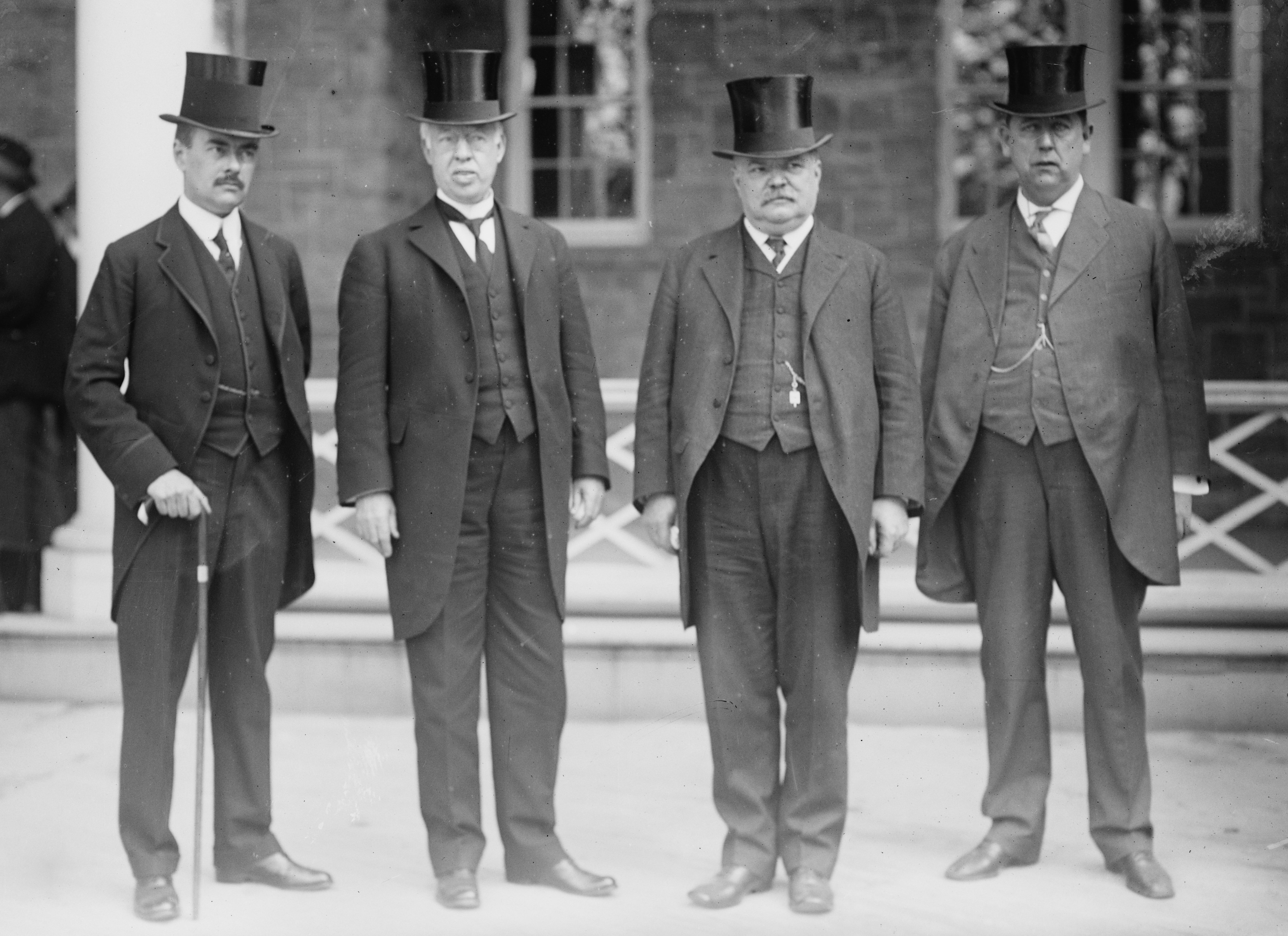
Henry Percival Dodge, and Joseph Rucker Lamar, and Frederick William Lehmann, and Robert F. Rose at the Niagara Falls peace conference in 1914

Frederick William Lehmann (February 28, 1853 – September 12, 1931) was an American lawyer, politician, United States Solicitor General, and rare book collector.

== Biography ==
He was born February 28, 1853, in Prussia. His father, Friedrich Wilhelm Lehmann, emigrated to Cincinnati, Ohio, when Frederick was two, where he ruled the family with an iron hand. His mother Sophia died young.

At age 10, Frederick ran away from home. As a vagabond, selling newspapers, working on farms, and herding sheep, he wandered across the Midwest, rarely going to school. In his teens, at the urging of his fellow sheep men, he took the stump for presidential candidate Horace Greeley and gave his first political speech.

At 17, he worked as a farm-hand for Judge Epenetus Sears of Tabor, Iowa. Sears was impressed with the boy's ability and sent him to the local Tabor College, where he graduated in 1873. After reading law in his benefactor's office, Lehmann practiced in Tabor, Sidney, Iowa, Nebraska City, Nebraska, and Des Moines, Iowa. He married Nora Stark of Indianola on December 23, 1879, and he represented the Wabash Railroad.

A noted orator, he was active in Iowa politics, including the election of Governor Horace Boies. In 1890, he moved with his family to St. Louis, Missouri, and continued to represent the Wabash while building a general law practice. In 1908, he was elected president of the American Bar Association and served twice.

President William Howard Taft named Lehmann as United States Solicitor General in 1910. In the Supreme Court of the United States Lehmann established the right to tax corporation incomes. He considered national bank affiliates to be illegal. About Lehmann's oral arguments, Justice Oliver Wendell Holmes Jr. told Felix Frankfurter that Lehmann was so persuasive "I don't dare decide against Lehmann. You feel as though you're ruling against God."

In 1912, he returned to practice law in St. Louis with his sons.

In 1914, however, he and Justice Joseph Rucker Lamar represented the United States at the ABC Powers Conference in which Argentina, Brazil, and Chile mediated between the United States and Mexico on the Veracruz Incident.

Cases in his private practice established the right of the Associated Press to news as intellectual property, he secured the Telephone Company's right to valuation on reproduction cost less depreciation, and he preserved the Coca-Cola Company's right to use "Coca" against a claim that it was fraudulent since actual cocaine had been removed from the drink formula.

In 1918, he became counsel for the Railway Wage Commission. He supported the forced separation of investment banks, commercial banks and brokerages (a policy later implemented in the Glass–Steagall Act of 1933), quoting "No man can serve two masters" from Matthew 6:2, which alluded to an inherent conflict of interest where investment banks promote the sale of investments, even risky ones, but commercial banks have a duty to avoid risky investments. Lehmann also vigorously opposed Prohibition.

Representing the U. S. government in the Supreme Court, he would "confess error", a practice in which the Solicitor General admits that the government has been wrong all along and just drops the case even when supported by a lower court's prior decision. Inscribed in the office rotunda of the Attorney General is Lehmann's famous saying, when a judge had remarked that he seemed to be supporting the opposing side: "The United States wins its point whenever justice is done its citizens in the courts."

Frederick Lehmann always refused to run for public office, especially at a party convention of the breakaway Gold Democrats (opposed to the Free Silver candidate William Jennings Bryan) in St. Louis which he chaired (being foreign-born, he could not run for President anyway), and he declined judgeships. In politics he was generally a Democrat, if sometimes a Gold Democrat. In 1909 he drafted the charter by which the City of St. Louis is still run today.

He was a founder of the Saint Louis Art Museum and the State Historical Society of Missouri, president of the St. Louis Public Library, and a director of the St. Louis World's Fair (Louisiana Purchase Exposition) of 1904, at which he was host of the Universal Congress of Jurists and Lawyers. He was a bibliophile and he collected rare first editions of Charles Dickens, Robert Burns and others, and artworks of Aubrey Beardsley, George Cruikshank and Thomas Rowlandson. He and industrialist William K. Bixby started the Burns Society; he was twice president of the University Club of St. Louis. Furthermore, he had a remarkable (possibly eidetic) memory—when writer Henry James visited his house, Lehmann could recite whole works that James himself had written but forgotten. For most his life Lehmann was in demand as a public speaker, which he thoroughly enjoyed. His published works included: John Marshall (1901), The Lawyer in American History (1906), Abraham Lincoln (1908), Conservatism in Legal Procedure (1909), Prohibition (1910), and The Law and the Newspaper (1917).

In old age he auctioned off his rare book collections. He died September 12, 1931, aged 78, survived by his wife and three sons, lawyers Sears Lehmann, Frederick W. Lehmann Jr., and John Stark Lehmann. He was buried in Bellefontaine Cemetery in St. Louis.

== Legacy ==
Three special collections at Olin Library, Washington University in St. Louis, include a selection of Lehmann's legal papers (including his time as Solicitor General), a collection of historic manuscript letters of notable people, and rare editions of works of Robert Burns and others. There is also a Frederick Lehmann Autograph Collection at the Missouri Historical Society, St. Louis.

Frederick W. Lehmann's house at No. 10 Benton Place in St. Louis is now preserved as the "Lehmann House" Bed and Breakfast.

Legal offices
Preceded by Lloyd Wheaton Bowers	Solicitor General; 1910–1912	Succeeded by William Marshall Bullitt
