= Tampico Affair =

Diplomatic and military crisis between Mexico and the US (1914)

Date	April 9, 1914
Location	Tampico, Tamaulipas, Mexico
Result	United States occupies Veracruz

Belligerents
United States	Mexico

Commanders and leaders
Henry T. Mayo	Ignacio Morelos Zaragoza

Strength
9 seamen	~10 infantry

The Tampico Affair began as a minor incident involving United States Navy sailors and the Mexican Federal Army loyal to Mexican dictator General Victoriano Huerta. On April 9, 1914, nine sailors had come ashore to secure supplies and were detained by Mexican forces. Commanding Admiral Henry Mayo demanded that the US sailors be released, and that Mexico issue an apology, raise and salute the US flag, and perform a 21-gun salute. Mexico promptly released the sailors, but refused the demand for a salute and colors. US President Woodrow Wilson backed the demand, and the conflict escalated when the Americans occupied the port city of Veracruz for more than six months. This contributed to the fall of Huerta, who resigned in July 1914. Since the US had not had diplomatic relations with Mexico since Huerta's seizure of power in 1913, the ABC powers Argentina, Brazil, and Chile offered to mediate the conflict, in the Niagara Falls peace conference, held in Canada. The American occupation of Veracruz caused widespread anti-American sentiment.

== Background ==
In the midst of the Mexican Revolution, General Victoriano Huerta became President of Mexico following a coup to oust the democratically-elected president, Francisco I. Madero. Opposition to Huerta grew from the forces of peasant leader Emiliano Zapata in the state of Morelos and the rapid advance of the Northern opposition Constitutionalists under the leadership of Governor of Coahuila Venustiano Carranza. By March 26, 1914, Carranza's forces were 10 mi (16 km) from the prosperous coastal oil town of Tampico, Tamaulipas. There was a large settlement of US citizens there due to the immense investment by US firms in the local oil industry. Several US Navy warships commanded by Rear Admiral Henry T. Mayo were deployed off the coast for the stated purpose of protecting US citizens and property.

By the spring of 1914, relations between the US and Mexico were strained. US President Woodrow Wilson refused to recognize the presidency of Mexican General Victoriano Huerta, who came to power by a coup d'état, with rebel General Félix Díaz, a nephew of ex-President Porfirio Díaz, had signed the Embassy Pact with the approval of US Ambassador Henry Lane Wilson, who had since been removed by the president.

During his State of the Union address on 2 Dec. 1913, Wilson stated, "There can be no certain prospect of peace in America until General Huerta has surrendered his usurped authority." In early 1914, Wilson lifted the arms embargo, which allowed the Constitutionalists to buy arms. With these moves, Wilson was moving closer to intervention.

Mayo's Fifth Division of the Atlantic Fleet was in Tampico to protect American lives and interest. Ships at his disposal included the battleships Connecticut and Minnesota and cruisers Chester and Des Moines. US interests included the Standard Oil refinery at Arbol Grande, other petroleum properties at Doña Cecilia, and associated American families and homes nearby. Although Tampico was besieged by Constitutionalist forces, relations between the US forces and Huerta's federal garrison remained amicable. Mayo's flagship, the gunboat Dolphin, honored a request of the Mexican government and fired a 21-gun salute to the Mexican flag three times on 2 April. This was in commemoration of the capture of Puebla from the French in 1867 by General Porfirio Díaz. Additionally, sailors from the US gunboat and two cruisers, anchored off Tampico in the Pánuco River, went ashore each day to play baseball.

On 6 April, Constitutionalist rebel forces, under the command of Col. Emiliano J. Nafarrete, occupied La Barra, Doña Cecilia, and Arbol Grande. General Ignacio Morelos Zaragoza, Tamaulipas governor and commander of the Federal Army garrison, and nephew of the late Mexican military hero and Secretary of the Army and Navy Ignacio Zaragoza, sent his gunboat Veracruz to shell the rebel forces behind the oil tanks. Mayo sent a letter to both parties stating he would remain neutral, but to protect American lives and property, he would "take all necessary steps." Mayo then evacuated several Americans, but refused to land troops to protect the American-owned refinery. After additional rebel attacks on 7 and 8 April at the Iturbide Bridge, the foreign population sought refuge on the US Navy ships, the German cruiser SMS Dresden, and British cruiser HMS Hermione. Clarence Miller, US consul in Tampico, sent an urgent request for help in evacuating the American population within the city. Then, on the evening of 8 April, a marine courier for the US consulate was detained but soon released.

Running short on gasoline for an auxiliary engine, Dolphin's Capt. Ralph Earle visited the US consulate on 9 April, where he arranged a purchase from a German civilian, Max Tyron. Capt. Earle was to arrange delivery from Tyron's dock. However, the dock was located in close proximity to the Iturbide Bridge.

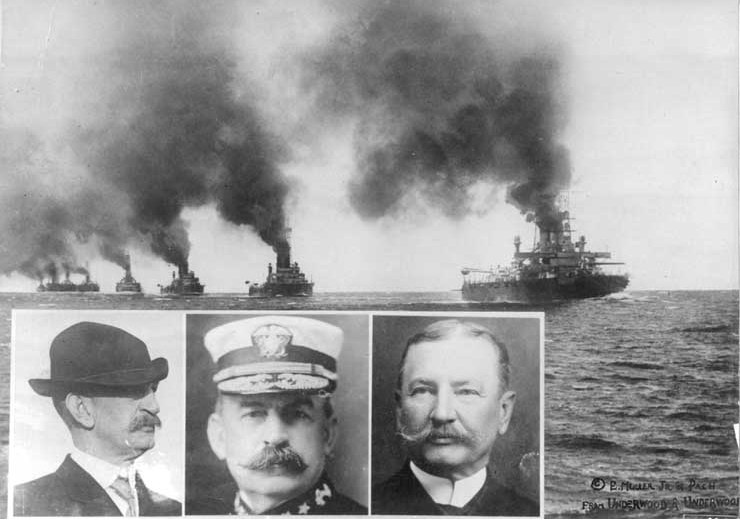
US battleships steaming toward Veracruz following the Tampico Affair. Inset: Appearing in the photograph (left to right): Rear Admiral Henry T. Mayo, Commander of US forces during the Tampico Affair; Rear Admiral Frank F. Fletcher, who commanded the landing to seize Veracruz; Vice Admiral Charles J. Badger, Commander of US Atlantic Fleet in 1914.

== Conflict ==
Capt. Earle ordered Ensign Charles C. Copp to take a whaleboat, and crew, to pick up coal from Tyron's dock. Though flying the US colors fore and aft, the US Navy sailors were unarmed and unable to speak Spanish. While loading the fuel, the sailors were surrounded by an armed squad of Zaragoza's soldiers. Two sailors, Coxswain G. H. Siefert and Seaman J. P. Harrington, were still on board the American whaleboat, but they too were taken at gunpoint. All were taken to Col. Ramón H. Hinojosa's headquarters. He released the Americans to continue reloading their gasoline, but they were not allowed to leave until permission was received from Zaragoza.

Max Tyron informed Capt. Earle and Admiral Mayo aboard the Dolphin, and Mayo ordered Earle to seek his men's release under strong protest. Earle, accompanied by Clarence Miller, met with Zaragoza who apologized, explaining his men were "evidently ignorant of the first laws of war." Within an hour of their arrest, the whaleboat had returned to Dolphin. Ensign Copp was faulted by Mayo for allowing his men to be taken from a US vessel. Mayo viewed the incident as an insult to US sovereignty, requiring reparation. Mayo had Commander William A. Moffett deliver a note to Zaragoza stating, "taking men from a boat flying the American flag is a hostile act, not to be excused." Mayo further demanded a "formal disavowal", that the responsible officer "receive severe punishment," and "that you hoist the American flag in a prominent position on shore and salute it with 21 guns, which salute will be duly returned by this ship."

Morelos Zaragoza referred the matter to the Mexican Ministry of War in Mexico City. When Wilson heard of the matter from Secretary of State William Jennings Bryan, Wilson responded, "Mayo could not have done otherwise," and further, "...unless the guilty persons are promptly punished consequences of gravest sort might ensue..."

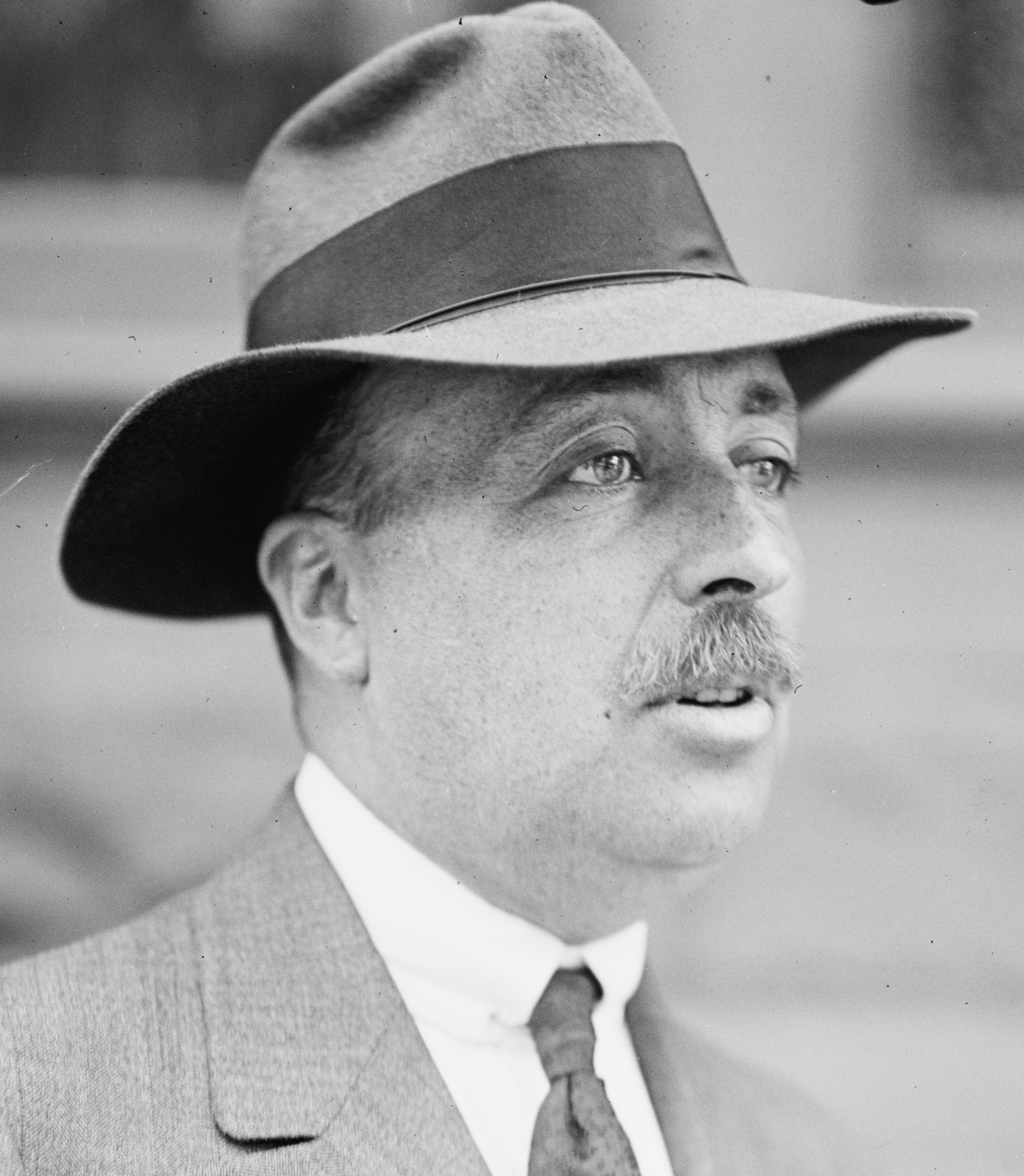
Nelson O'Shaughnessy, the American Chargé d'Affaires ad interim in 1914

Nelson J. O'Shaughnessy, the US Chargé d'Affaires ad interim in Mexico City, was informed of the incident by Roberto A. Esteva Ruiz, Mexico's Ministry of Foreign Relations, on 10 April. Ruiz requested that Mayo's demands be withdrawn, since Zaragoza had already made a verbal apology. Both O'Shaughnessy and Ruiz brought the matter to Huerta's attention, who also agreed that Mayo's ultimatum should be withdrawn. O'Shaughnessy then released the Mexican account to the Associated Press in Mexico, misstating that the arrested Americans involved were Marines, not sailors, and that they had been "paraded" through the streets of Tampico.

On 12 April, Huerta stated, via Ruiz to O'Shaughnessy, that since Zaragoza had apologized and arrested Hinojosa, the US had "ample satisfaction." The Mexican government would not apologize further, nor salute the US flag. Huerta called these "humiliating terms...carrying courtesy to that point would be equivalent to accepting the sovereignty of a foreign state to the derogation of national dignity and decorum, which the president is disposed to have respected in any case." O'Shaughnessy told Ruiz that Wilson might need to "uphold our national dignity, even with armed force, if necessary."

On 13 April, Wilson told reporters, "The salute will be fired." On 14 April, Wilson ordered the Atlantic Fleet, under the command of Vice Admiral Charles Johnston Badger, to Mexican waters. Huerta stated, "Is it a calamity? No. It is the best thing that could happen to us." On 15 April, Wilson stated regarding the Mexico situation, there had been "many cases...of the flouting of the rights of US citizens or the dignity of the government of the United States, and no attempt at either reparation or correction." On 16 April, Washington was notified that Huerta had agreed to a simultaneous salute, signifying "satisfaction with which the two countries see the happy end of a conflict which has at no time been really serious." Yet Wilson decided the US fleet would stay to prevent any ..."manifestations of ill-will and contempt for the United States which Huerta has exhibited in the past," and misunderstood Huerta's meaning of simultaneous. When simultaneous was finally understood, Wilson opposed the idea, and fleet orders remained the same. Huerta maintained he had done "everything he was obliged to do." On 18 April, Wilson stated he would see Congress, "with a view of taking such actions as may be necessary to enforce the respect due to the nation's flag," if Mexico did not fire the salute by the next day.

== Aftermath ==
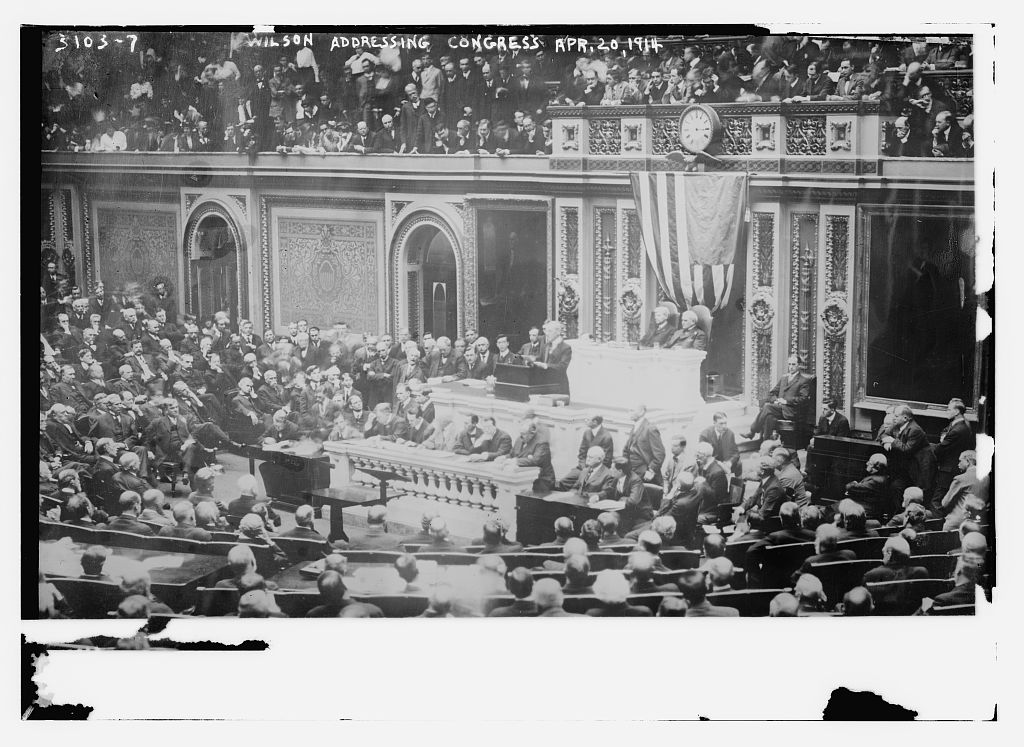
President Woodrow Wilson addresses a Joint Session of Congress April 20, 1914

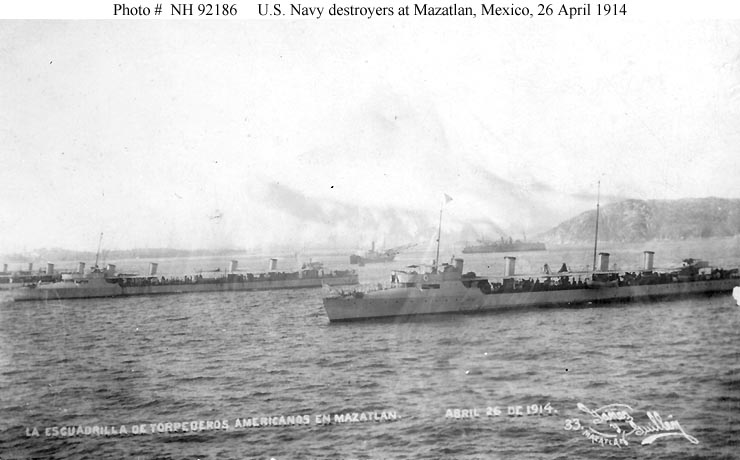
USS Truxtun and Whipple at Mazatlan, April 26, 1914, keeping watch on Mexican gunboat Morales (two-funnel ship in background)

President Wilson sought Congressional approval for the use of armed forces on 20 April. In particular, Wilson advocated "taking Vera Cruz," to get rid of Huerta and his illegitimate authority. Wilson received Congressional approval that evening, and ordered landings at Veracruz, so as to seize the Custom house, and intercept an expected arms shipment for Huerta's forces.

In the ensuing occupation of Veracruz, 19 Americans were killed and 72 wounded. Mexican losses were estimated at 150 to 170 soldiers killed and between 195 and 250 wounded. An unknown number of civilians were killed. On the Pacific Coast of Mexico, US Naval units were monitoring the fight between Huerta's forces and the rebels while they protected US citizens and interests. In Ensenada, Baja California, US Consul Claude E. Guyant and 250 of his fellow citizens were forced to seek safety in the US consulate building, as Mexican authorities were powerless to control anti-American demonstrations that had erupted on April 23. Guyant cabled Washington, "Have taken refuge in consulate. Situation critical. Send warship immediately." USS Cheyenne was sent from San Diego, California, to Ensenada with orders to protect US lives at any cost, including capturing the port if necessary. Iris, en route to Mazatlan, diverted course to Ensenada to assist Cheyenne. They were to evacuate Guyant and other Americans. The welfare of approximately 50,000 US citizens living in Mexico was affected by the invasion of Veracruz. Refugee camps were set up in San Diego, Texas, and New Orleans to receive the Americans. Ultimately, the US military transport ship USS Buford sailed from San Francisco in early May and made stops at numerous ports on the west coast of Mexico to pick up additional American refugees. USS Iris also picked up numerous American refugees during May, including Clement Edwards, the US consul at Acapulco. By May 4, a total of 71 US Navy ships were operating in Mexican waters.

In January 1917, Germany sent the so-called Zimmermann Telegram, which implied that a Mexican alliance with Germany against the US would result in Mexico regaining territory taken from it by the US in prior wars and that Germany's forthcoming unrestricted submarine warfare campaign would guarantee defeat of the British and French. The British interception of Zimmermann's telegram and the German unrestricted submarine warfare against US merchant ships soon afterward, were effectively both final justifications that President Wilson needed to request a declaration of war against Germany, in April 1917.

Anti-American sentiment in Mexico from the Tampico incident was the chief reason that the Mexican government remained neutral in World War I. Mexico refused to participate with the US military excursion in Europe and granted full guarantees to German companies for keeping their operations open, specifically in Mexico City.

President Wilson considered another military invasion of Veracruz and Tampico in 1917–1918, to take control of the Isthmus of Tehuantepec, the shortest overland route between the Atlantic and Pacific oceans, and the Tampico oil fields. The relatively new Mexican president, Venustiano Carranza, threatened to destroy the oil fields in case the Marines landed there.

== See also ==
- Mexico in World War I
- United States involvement in the Mexican Revolution
