= Rómulo Sebastián Naón =

Argentine lawyer, politician and ambassador

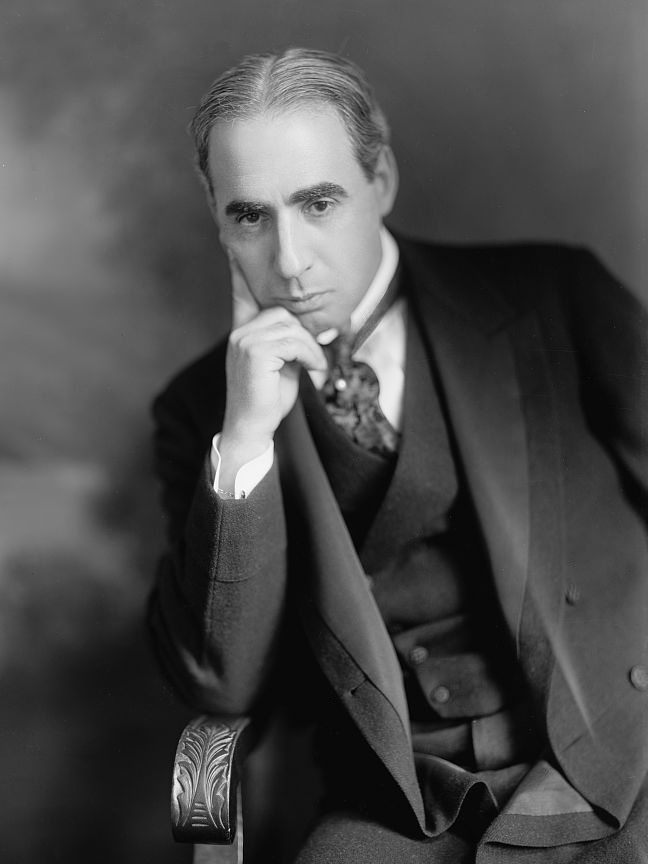
- Naón c. 1915

33rd Mayor of Buenos Aires
- In office 20 February 1932 – 19 September 1932
- Preceded by: José Guerrico
- Succeeded by: Mariano de Vedia y Mitre

Argentine Ambassador to the United States
- In office 1910–1919

Personal details
- Born: 1875 Buenos Aires, Argentina
- Died: 29 December 1941 (aged 65–66)
- Occupation: Lawyer; politician
- Awards: Thanks of Congress; Congressional Gold Medal

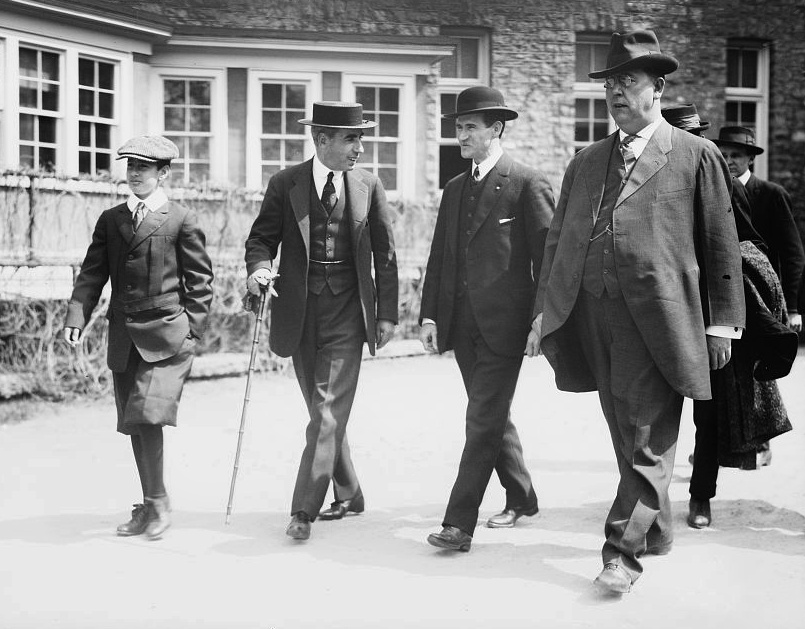
Rómulo S. Naón of Argentina and Robert F. Rose in Niagara Falls in 1914 at the Niagara Falls peace conference

Rómulo Sebastián Naón Peralta Martínez (1875–1941), was an Argentine lawyer, politician and Ambassador to the United States from 1910 to 1919.

He also briefly served as Mayor of Buenos Aires from February to September 1932.

== Biography ==
He was born in 1876 in Buenos Aires to Julio César Naón Capanegra and Felisa Peralta Martínez de Oliden. He married Isabel Rodríguez Marcenal. In 1914 he attended the Niagara Falls peace conference to reduce tensions between Mexico and the United States. He died 1941 in Buenos Aires.

On March 4, 1915, Naón and two others received the Thanks of Congress and were awarded Congressional Gold Medals (P.L. 63–75, 38 Stat. 1228). The statute reads as follows.

Resolved by the Senate and House of Representatives of the United States of America in Congress assembled, That the thanks of Congress to their excellencies be, and they are hereby, presented to their excellencies Señor Domício da Gama, Señor Rómulo S. Naón, and Señor Eduardo Suárez for their generous services as mediators in the controversy between the Government of the United States of America and the leaders of the warring parties in the Republic of Mexico. That the President of the United States is hereby authorized and requested to cause to be made and presented to their excellencies Señor Domicio da Gama, Señor Rómulo S. Naón, and Señor Eduardo Suárez suitable gold medals, appropriately inscribed, which shall express the high estimation in which Congress holds the services of these distinguished statesmen, and the Republics which they represent, in the promotion of peace and order in the American continent.

Diplomatic posts
Preceded by Epifanio Portela	Argentine Ambassador to the United States; 1910–1919	Succeeded by Tomás Le Breton
Political offices
Preceded by José Guerrico	Mayor of Buenos Aires; February 1932–September 1932	Succeeded by Mariano de Vedia y Mitre
