= Eduardo Suárez Mujica =

Chilean politician and diplomat

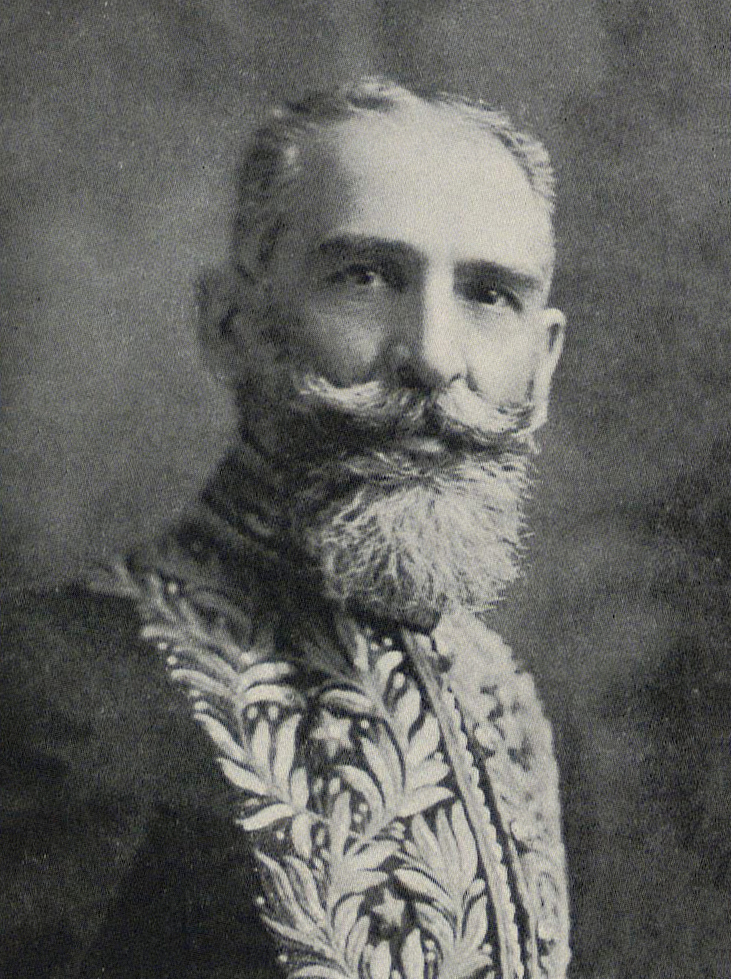

Eduardo Suárez Mujica (April, 1859 – April 22, 1922), was the Chilean Ambassador to the United States in 1914 and the Minister of Foreign Affairs from 1917 to 1918.

== Biography ==
Mujica was born in Santiago, Chile in April 1859 to Eugenio Suárez Pérez and Benedicta Pérez Mujica. He studied at the Instituto Nacional from 1871 to 1873. He then attended the University of Chile Law School. He married Leonor Gonzalez Orrego. He was made a Senior Officer, Ministry of Foreign Affairs on October 16, 1882. Atacama Governor in 1901.

He was Minister of Justice from August 29, 1908 to January 22, 1909 in the administration of Pedro Montt. Minister to Mexico and Cuba in 1909, Minister to the U.S. in 1911, Ambassador in Washington in 1914. Minister of Foreign Affairs from October 12, 1917 to January 18, 1918 in the administration of Juan Luis Sanfuentes.

Deputy for Copiapo, Chañaral, Vallenar and Freirina from 1903 to 1912. During his period as deputy he joined the Foreign Relations Committee. He died in Santiago on April 22, 1922.

On March 4, 1915 Suárez and two others received the Thanks of Congress and were awarded Congressional Gold Medals (P.L. 63–75, 38 Stat. 1228). The statute reads as follows.

Resolved by the Senate and House of Representatives of the United States of America in Congress assembled, That the thanks of Congress to their excellencies be, and they are hereby, presented to their excellencies Señor Domício da Gama, Señor Rómulo S. Naón, and Señor Eduardo Suárez for their generous services as mediators in the controversy between the Government of the United States of America and the leaders of the warring parties in the Republic of Mexico. That the President of the United States is hereby authorized and requested to cause to be made and presented to their excellencies Señor Domicio da Gama, Señor Rómulo S. Naón, and Señor Eduardo Suárez suitable gold medals, appropriately inscribed, which shall express the high estimation in which Congress holds the services of these distinguished statesmen, and the Republics which they represent, in the promotion of peace and order in the American continent.
