= Joseph Rucker Lamar =

US Supreme Court justice from 1911 to 1916

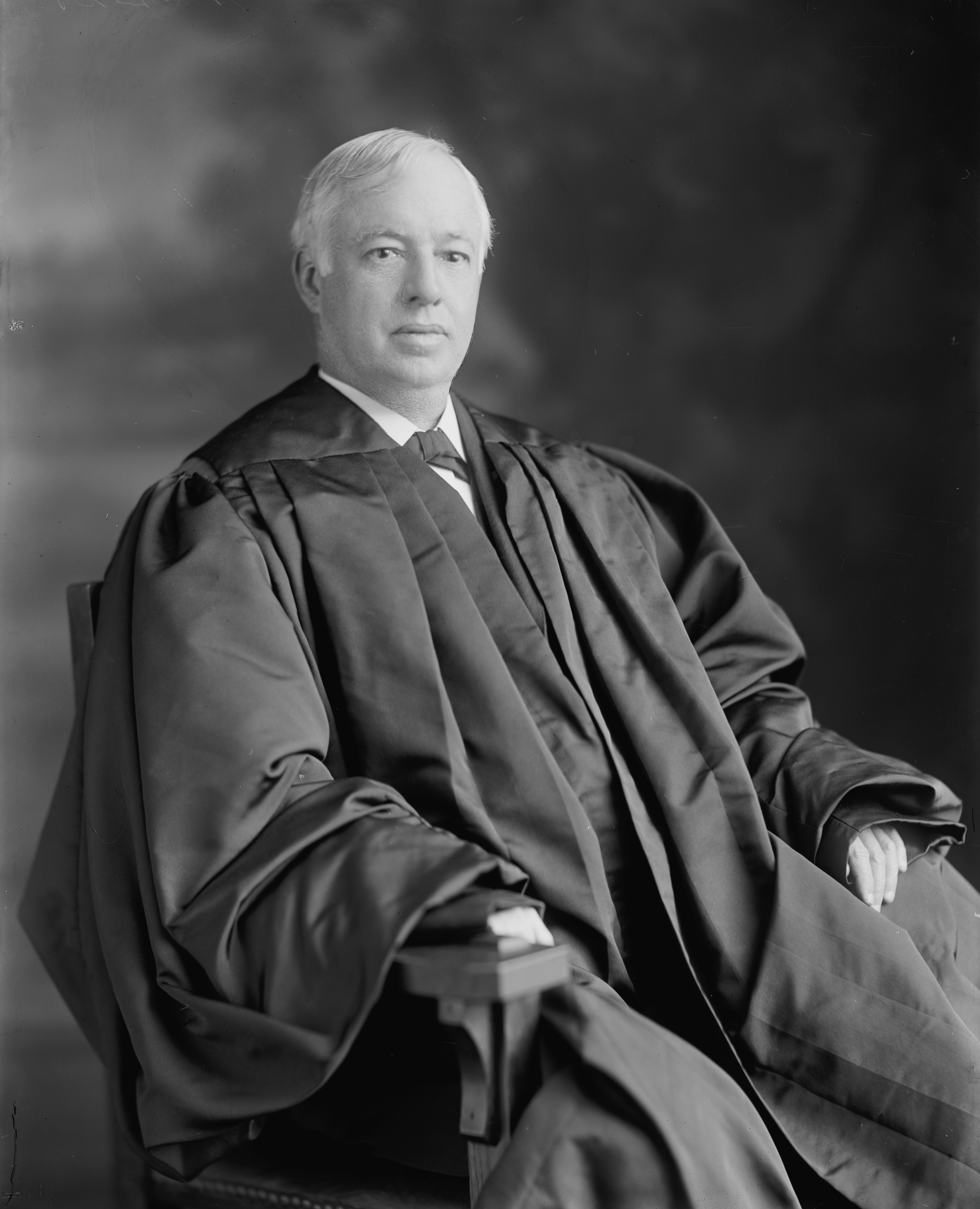
- Lamar, 1905–1916

Associate Justice of the Supreme Court of the United States
- In office January 3, 1911 – January 2, 1916
- Nominated by: William Howard Taft
- Preceded by: William Moody
- Succeeded by: Louis Brandeis

Justice of the Georgia Supreme Court
- In office 1901–1905

Member of the Georgia House of Representatives
- In office 1886–1889

Personal details
- Born: October 14, 1857 Ruckersville, Georgia, U.S.
- Died: January 2, 1916 (aged 58) Washington, D.C., U.S.
- Party: Democratic
- Spouse: Clarinda Pendleton (m. 1879)
- Children: 3
- Education: University of Georgia; Bethany College, West Virginia (BA); Washington and Lee University School of Law (no degree)

Joseph Rucker Lamar (October 14, 1857 – January 2, 1916) was an Associate Justice of the United States Supreme Court appointed by President William Howard Taft. A cousin of former associate justice Lucius Quintus Cincinnatus Lamar, he served from 1911 until his death in 1916.

== Biography ==
Born in Ruckersville, Elbert County, Georgia, Lamar was the son of a minister and attended the Academy of Richmond County in Augusta, Georgia and the Martin Institute in Jefferson, Georgia. During his time in Augusta, he lived next door to and was the "closest friend" of future president Woodrow Wilson, whose father was the local Presbyterian minister. They both also attended Joseph T. Derry's school for boys in a local warehouse, a school whose other students would also become a future Congressman, major newspaper owner/ambassador and the dean of Columbia Law School. After Lamar graduated from the Penn Lucy School near Baltimore, Maryland, he attended the University of Georgia where he was a member of the Phi Kappa Literary Society. After his family moved he completed his degree at Bethany College in 1877, where he was a member of Beta Theta Pi. After attending law school at Washington and Lee University School of Law, he left and completed his legal education by reading law with a prominent Augusta attorney, then returned to Bethany College to teach Latin for a year, afterward practicing law in Augusta.

From 1886 to 1889, he served in the Georgia House of Representatives, and then was appointed by the Supreme Court of Georgia in 1893 as a member of the Commission to Recodify the Laws of Georgia, which prepared a code of laws for the state. Two years later, that code was adopted by the state General Assembly.

On January 1, 1901, Lamar was appointed to fill an unexpired term of Justice William A. Little in the Supreme Court of Georgia, then was re-elected in 1903. He wrote more than 200 opinions before resigning in 1905 to again practice law, defending railroads and many other large corporations.

On December 12, 1910, Lamar was nominated by President William Howard Taft as an associate justice of the United States Supreme Court, to a seat vacated by William H. Moody. Lamar was confirmed by the United States Senate on December 15, 1910, and was sworn into office on January 3, 1911.

At a reception after Woodrow Wilson's inauguration in 1913, the two friends were able to meet again and swapped stories of their Georgia youth. They remained in contact while they were in Washington. In 1915, Lamar wrote two short individual opinions in the famed Leo Frank case. He declined to grant a petition for habeas corpus brought by Frank to challenge the fairness of his trial, but subsequently granted a writ of error allowing Frank to bring his claims before the court. The full Court went on to reject Frank's claim in Frank v. Mangum; Lamar voted with the majority but did not write a separate opinion.

Lamar, together with Frederick W. Lehmann, was selected in 1914 to represent the United States at the ABC Powers Conference convened to avert a war over the Veracruz Incident. In the fall of 1915, Lamar suffered a paralytic stroke. Legislation was proposed to allow Lamar to retire with full pay, but his death just months later made the issue a moot point.

He died in Washington, D.C., on January 2, 1916.

== Legacy and honors ==
Lamar's professional papers, including correspondence concerning his years as a Justice, are archived at the University of Georgia in Athens, Georgia, and available for research. The Joseph Rucker Lamar Boyhood Home in Augusta, Georgia is listed on the National Register of Historic Places.

During World War II the Liberty ship SS Joseph R. Lamar was built in Brunswick, Georgia, and named in his honor.

== See also ==
- List of justices of the Supreme Court of the United States

Legal offices
Preceded by William Moody	Associate Justice of the Supreme Court of the United States; 1911–1916	Succeeded by Louis Brandeis
