= Alexander Colden =

American merchant and public official in Colonial New York

President of the Saint Andrew's Society of the State of New York
- In office 1764–1766
- Preceded by: William Alexander
- Succeeded by: Walter Rutherfurd

Personal details
- Born: August 13, 1716 Philadelphia, Pennsylvania, British America
- Died: December 12, 1774 (aged 58) Flushing, New York, U.S.
- Spouse: Elizabeth Nicolls (died 1774)
- Parent(s): Cadwallader Colden; Alice Chrystie Colden

Alexander Colden (August 13, 1716 – December 12, 1774) was an American merchant and public official in Colonial New York who was the son of Cadwallader Colden.

== Early life ==
Colden was born on August 13, 1716, in Philadelphia, Pennsylvania, in what was then a part of British America. He was the eldest son of Dr. Cadwallader Colden (1688–1776) and Alice (née Chrystie) Colden. Among his siblings were Elizabeth Alice Colden (wife of Peter DeLancey, a son of merchant Stephen DeLancey and brother of Gov. James DeLancey); Cadwallader Colden Jr.; Jane Colden, the first female botanist working in America; Alice Colden (wife of Col. Isaac Willet); and David Colden (who married Ann Alice Willett). His father was the 31st, 33rd, and 35th Colonial Governor of New York.

His paternal grandparents were the Rev. Alexander Colden and Janet (née Hughes) Colden.

== Career ==
In 1737, he was appointed Ranger of Ulster County, which included Coldenham. There, he ran a country store that sold general merchandise.

In 1751, he was appointed Joint Surveyor General of the Province of New York with his father, and succeeded him in that office from 1761 to 1762. At that point he moved from Newburgh, New York, to New York City, where he served as Postmaster of New York City for a number of years.

Colden was one of the founders and an original member of the Saint Andrew's Society of the State of New York, serving as president from 1764 to 1766.

== Personal life ==
Colden was married to Elizabeth Nicolls (1720–1774), the second daughter of Richard Nicholls and Margaret Tudor. Together, Alexander and Elizabeth were the parents of:

- Richard Nicolls Colden (1745–1777), who married Henrietta Maria Bethune (b. 1745). After his death, his widow married Richard Berryman.
- Cadwallader Colden, who died in childhood.
- John Colden, who was lost at sea.
- Alice Colden, who married Col. Archibald Hamilton (1728–1795), son of Alexander Hamilton of Ballencrieff.
- Margaret Colden (c. 1748–1789), who married Major John Antill, son of Hon. Edward Antill of New Jersey.
- Elizabeth Colden, who married Col. Anthony Farrington, 1st Baronet of the Royal Arsenal in 1766.
- Jane Colden (1755–1827), who married Major John Antill after the death of her elder sister Margaret.

Colden died in 1774, at Spring Hill in Flushing, New York.

=== Descendants ===
Through his son Richard, he was a grandfather of Alexander Colden and Cadwallader R. Colden, editor of the U.S. Sporting Magazine from 1835 to 1836.

Through his daughter Alice, he was the grandfather of Mary Elizabeth Jane Douglas Hamilton, wife of Francis Napier (grandson of Francis Napier, 6th Lord Napier) and mother of historian Mark Napier.
