= Henriette Marie =

Henriette Marie, Henrietta Maria, Henrietta Marie, or Henrietta Marrie may refer to:

== People ==
- Henrietta Maria of France (1609–1669), queen consort of Charles I, King of England
- Henriette Marie of the Palatinate (1626–1651), third daughter of Frederick V, Elector Palatine
- Henrietta Maria of Brandenburg-Schwedt (1702–1782), second daughter of Philip William, Margrave of Brandenburg-Schwedt
- Henrietta Marie Colden (1745–1800), Scottish salon holder
- Henrietta Maria Bowdler (1750–1830), English writer
- Henrietta Maria Moriarty (1781–1842), English novelist
- Henrietta Maria Dillon-Lee (1807–1895), British women's education activist
- Henrietta Maria Gulliver (1866–1945), Australian artist
- Henrietta Marrie (born 1954), Australian scholar and Indigenous rights activist

== Ships ==
- English ship Henrietta Maria (1633)
- Henrietta Marie, a slave ship that sank in 1700

== See also ==
- Henriette (disambiguation)
- Marie (disambiguation)
- Marie Henriette (disambiguation)
- Princess Henriette of Liechtenstein (German: Henriette Maria Norberta; 1843–1931), seventh daughter of Aloys II, Prince of Liechtenstein
