= 1727 in literature =

This article contains information about the literary events and publications of 1727.

== Events ==
- November 22 – Richard Savage is arrested for the murder of James Sinclair in a drunken quarrel the previous night. He escapes the death penalty through the intercession of Frances, Countess of Hertford (wife of the man later known as Algernon Seymour, 7th Duke of Somerset), and others.
- December 13 – Lewis Theobald's Double Falshood; or, The Distrest Lovers, claimed as an adaptation of the otherwise lost Cardenio by Shakespeare and Fletcher, is acted at Theatre Royal, Drury Lane, London. It will be printed the following year.
- unknown date – Publisher Edmund Curll is convicted under English law for publishing an English translation of Venus in the Cloister (in 1724) under the common law offence of disturbing the peace, setting a legal precedent for prosecutions for obscenity.

== New books ==
=== Prose ===
- Anonymous (attributed to Eliza Haywood) – Memoirs of the Court of Liliput
- John Arbuthnot - Tables of Ancient Coins, Weights and Measures
- Henry Baker – The Universe, a Poem intended to restrain the Pride of Man
- Elizabeth Boyd (as Louisa) – Variety
- Cadwallader Colden – The History of the Five Indian Nations
- Mary Davys – The Accomplished Rake
- Daniel Defoe
  - Conjugal Lewdness
  - An Essay on the History and Reality of Apparitions
  - A New Family Instructor
- John Gay – Fables
- Madeleine-Angélique de Gomez – Anecdotes persanes, dédiées au roy (Persian Anecdotes, Dedicated to the King)
- Eliza Haywood
  - Philidore and Placentia
  - Cleomelia
  - The Perplex'd Dutchess
  - The Secret History of the Present Intrigues of the Court of Caramania (roman à clef)
- Edward Hyde, 1st Earl of Clarendon – A Collection of Several Tracts
- Madame de Lambert – Réflexions nouvelles sur les femmes, ou Métaphysique d'amour (New Reflections on Women, or Metaphysics of Love)
- John Oldmixon – Clarendon and Whitlock Compar'd
- Arabella Plantin – The Ingrateful (Or, The Just Revenge)
- James Ralph – The Tempest
- Henry St. John – The Occasional Writer (periodical)
- Jonathan Swift, Alexander Pope, John Arbuthnot, et al. – Miscellanies in Prose and Verse
- Évrard Titon du Tillet – Le Parnasse François
- William Warburton (anonymously) – The Legal Judicature in Chancery Stated
- José Francisco de Isla
  - Juventud triunfante
  - El tapabocas
- Diego de Torres Villarroel – Visiones y visitas de Torres con Francisco de Quevedo por la corte

=== Drama ===
- John Durant Breval – The Strollers
- Philippe Néricault Destouches – Le Philosophe Marié (The Married Philosopher)
- Philip Frowde – The Fall of Saguntum
- David Lewis – Philip of Macedon
- James Moore Smythe – The Rival Modes
- Lewis Theobald – The Rape of Proserpine

=== Poetry ===
- Christopher Pitt – Poems and Translations
- Alexander Pope (attributed) – Several Copies of Verses on Occasion of Mr. Gulliver's Travels (possibly by the whole Scriblerus Club)
- James Thomson
  - A Poem Sacred to the Memory of Sir Isaac Newton
  - Summer (part of The Seasons)
- John Wright – Spiritual Songs for Children

== Births ==
- March 7 – André Morellet, French economist and writer (died 1819)
- October 27 – Hester Chapone, English writer of conduct books (died 1801)
- December 27 – Arthur Murphy, Irish biographer (died 1805)
- December – John Hoole, English translator (died 1803)

== Deaths ==
- January 17 – Johann Christoph Wichmannshausen, German philologist (born 1663)
- February 13 – William Wotton, English scholar, target of Jonathan Swift (born 1666)
- September 17 – Glückel of Hameln, German diarist (born 1647)
- September 25 – Sarah Kemble Knight, diarist in colonial Massachusetts (born 1666)
