= Robert K. Christenberry =

American politician and businessman (1899–1973)

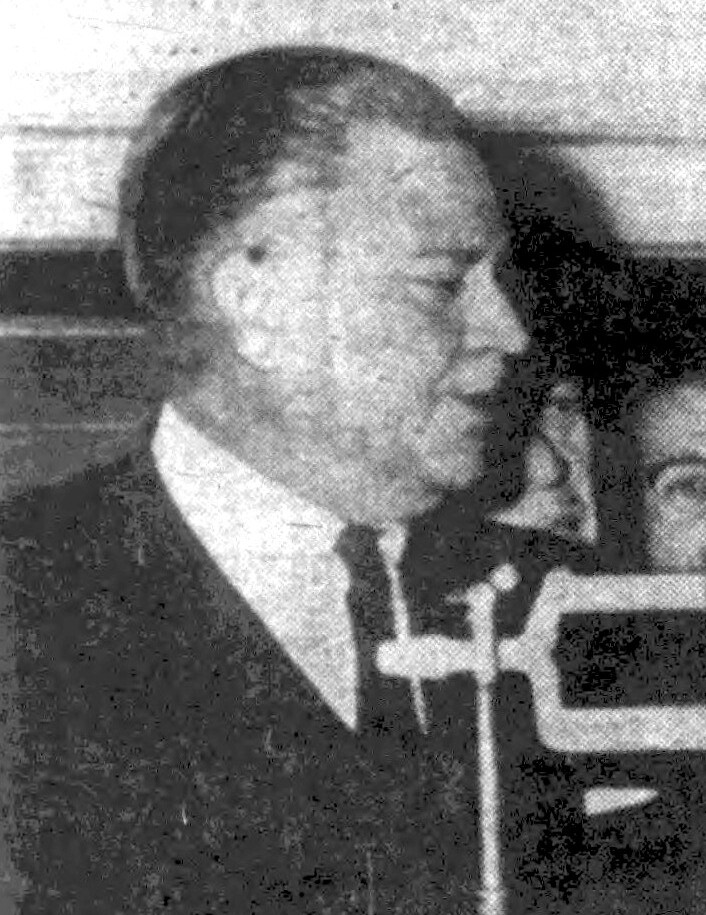
- Christenberry in 1953

Postmaster of New York City
- In office 1957–1966
- President: Dwight D. Eisenhower
- Preceded by: Robert H. Schaffer
- Succeeded by: John R. Strachan

Chairman of the New York State Athletic Commission
- In office 1951–1955
- Governor: Thomas E. Dewey
- Preceded by: Eddie Eagan
- Succeeded by: Julius Helfand

Personal details
- Born: January 27, 1899 Huntingdon, Tennessee, U.S.
- Died: April 13, 1973 (aged 74) Memphis, Tennessee, U.S.
- Party: Republican
- Profession: Hotel manager

Robert Keaton Christenberry (January 27, 1899 – April 13, 1973) was an American businessman and political figure who served as president of the Hotel Astor, chairman of the New York State Athletic Commission and Postmaster of New York City and was the Republican nominee in the 1957 New York City mayoral election.

== Early life ==
Christenberry was born on January 27, 1899, in Huntingdon, Tennessee. He grew up in Milan, Tennessee. Christenberry enlisted in the United States Marine Corps following the United States' entry into World War I. He served in the 55th Company, 2nd Battalion, 5th Marine Regiment, which was positioned in the trenches near Verdun. During grenade practice, a defective grenade exploded on Christenberry, which caused serious damage to his right arm and resulted in his discharge. After the war, Christenberry served as the American vice consul in Vladivostok and Santo Domingo and was a sports reporter for The Washington Herald.

== Business career ==
Christenberry got his start in the hotel business as a deputy hotel commissioner of Florida. He then served as public relations director of the Hotel Winton in Cleveland from 1929 to 1931, sales and promotions director of the Book-Cadillac in Detroit from 1931 to 1932, manager of the Jefferson in Peoria from 1933 to 1934, and general manager of the Roosevelt in Pittsburgh from 1934 to 1935. In 1935 he became the vice president and general manager of Hotel Astor in New York City. In 1944 he was promoted to president and treasurer of the Astor. In 1945 the Astor was purchased by Sheraton Hotels and Christenberry became the vice president and managing director of the Sheraton Astor. From 1955 to 1964 he was the president and chairman of the Ambassador Hotel.

From 1941 to 1956, Christenberry served as president of the Broadway Association. During World War II he served as head of the Greater New York Civilian Defense Volunteer Office's War Identification Bureau, was a hotel industry adviser to the Office of Price Administration, and led Manhattan's air raid warden organization. Christenberry was also as a director of the Ritz-Carlton Hotel, Webb and Knapp, and the Hotel Association of New York City, a member of the National Council of the Boy Scouts of America, and a trustee of the St. James School.

== New York State Athletic Commission ==
In 1951, Governor Thomas E. Dewey appointed Christenberry chairman of the New York State Athletic Commission. Dewey tasked Christenberry and his fellow commissioners with cleaning up the sport of boxing. Christenberry overturned Carmen Basilio's May 29, 1952, victory over Charles Pierce Davey after finding discrepancies on the referee's scorecard. Following a December 19, 1952 Joey Giardello-Billy Graham at Madison Square Garden, Christenberry changed judge Joe Agnello's card from 6-4 Giardello to 5–5 with Graham ahead on points, 6–5, giving Graham the victory. This decision led to legal action which concluded on February 17, 1953, when Judge Bernard Botein upheld Christenberry's decision. In 1955, Dewey's successor W. Averell Harriman replaced Christenberry as chairman, but Christenberry remained on the commission until March 12, 1956.

== Mayoral campaign ==
On June 27, 1957, the Republican leaders of New York's five boroughs announced that after a two-month search they had selected Christenberry to be the party's nominee for Mayor. Throughout the campaign, Christenberry attacked incumbent Robert F. Wagner Jr. on the issue of crime and claimed that the administration had "miserably failed" on that issue. He centered his campaign around a plan to hire 5,000 new police officers, the reduction of graft and corruption in city government, and halting New York City's population loss. President Eisenhower and Vice President Nixon appeared with and endorsed Christenberry. He also received the endorsement of former Governor Dewey and was praised by Eleanor Roosevelt for his energy and knowledge of the issues. Wagner, who was favored throughout the race, defeated Christenberry 69% to 27%.

== Postmaster of New York City ==
On June 3, 1958, Christenberry was sworn in as acting Postmaster of New York. He was recommended for the position by Senator Jacob Javits after his original choice, Samuel Roman, declined the position. On July 6, 1959, he was nominated by President Eisenhower for permanent status as postmaster. He was confirmed by the United States Senate on September 15, 1959. He resigned as Postmaster due to ill health effective June 17, 1966.

== Later life ==
Upon his retirement, Christenberry moved to Fort Lauderdale, Florida. In February 1973 he suffered a stroke while visiting relatives in Tennessee. He never recovered and died on April 13, 1973, at Methodist University Hospital in Memphis, Tennessee.
