= Windon =

Windon is a surname. Notable people with the surname include:

- Colin Windon (1921–2003), Australian rugby union player
- Keith Windon (1917–1998), Australian rugby union player
- Stephen F. Windon (born 1959), Australian cinematographer

== See also ==
- Winton (surname)
