= Winton =

Winton may refer to:

== Places ==
=== Australia ===
- Winton, Queensland, a town
- Shire of Winton, Queensland
- Winton, Victoria, a town
- Winton Motor Raceway in Winton, Victoria

=== New Zealand ===
- Winton, New Zealand, a town in Southland

=== United Kingdom ===
- Winton, an archaic name for Winchester, the county city of Hampshire, England
- Winton, Cumbria, England, a village and civil parish
- Winton, Dorset, a suburb of Bournemouth, England
- Winton, Greater Manchester, a small village
- Winton, North Yorkshire, a hamlet
- Winton House, Pencaitland, East Lothian, the ancient seat of the Earls of Winton
- Winton Square, Stoke-on-Trent, Staffordshire, England

=== United States ===
- Winton, California, a census-designated place
- Winton, Minnesota, a city
- Winton, North Carolina, a town
- Winton, Washington, an unincorporated community
- Winton, Wyoming, a ghost town
- Winton (Clifford, Virginia), a home on the National Register of Historic Places
- Camp Winton, California, a summer camp of the Boy Scouts of America

=== Outer space ===
- 19384 Winton, an asteroid named for Nicholas Winton

== Businesses ==
- Winton Engine Company, from 1930 part of General Motors (now Electro-Motive Diesel)
- Winton Motor Carriage Company, an American automobile manufacturer from 1896 to 1924
- Winton Group, a global investment management and data science company

== Education ==
- Winton Academy, a secondary school in Bournemouth, Dorset, England
- Winton Community Academy, a secondary school in Andover, Hampshire, England
- (Winton), denoting post-nominal letters of a University of Winchester alumni

== People ==
- Winton (surname), a surname
- Winton W. Marshall (1919–2015), United States Air Force General

== Characters ==
- Winton, a bulldog character in the series Bluey

== See also ==
- Winton Formation, a Cretaceous formation in Queensland, Australia
- Winton Professor of the Public Understanding of Risk, University of Cambridge
- Winton Manor, a former hotel, now an apartment building in Cleveland, Ohio, United States
- De Winton (disambiguation)
