= Wintin =

Wintin may refer to:

- Wintin, a brand name of the generic drug Lorazepam
- Win Tin, (1930 – 2014), a Burmese journalist, politician, and political prisoner

== See also ==
- Winton (disambiguation)
