= Charles W. Dayton =

American politician and judge (1846–1910)

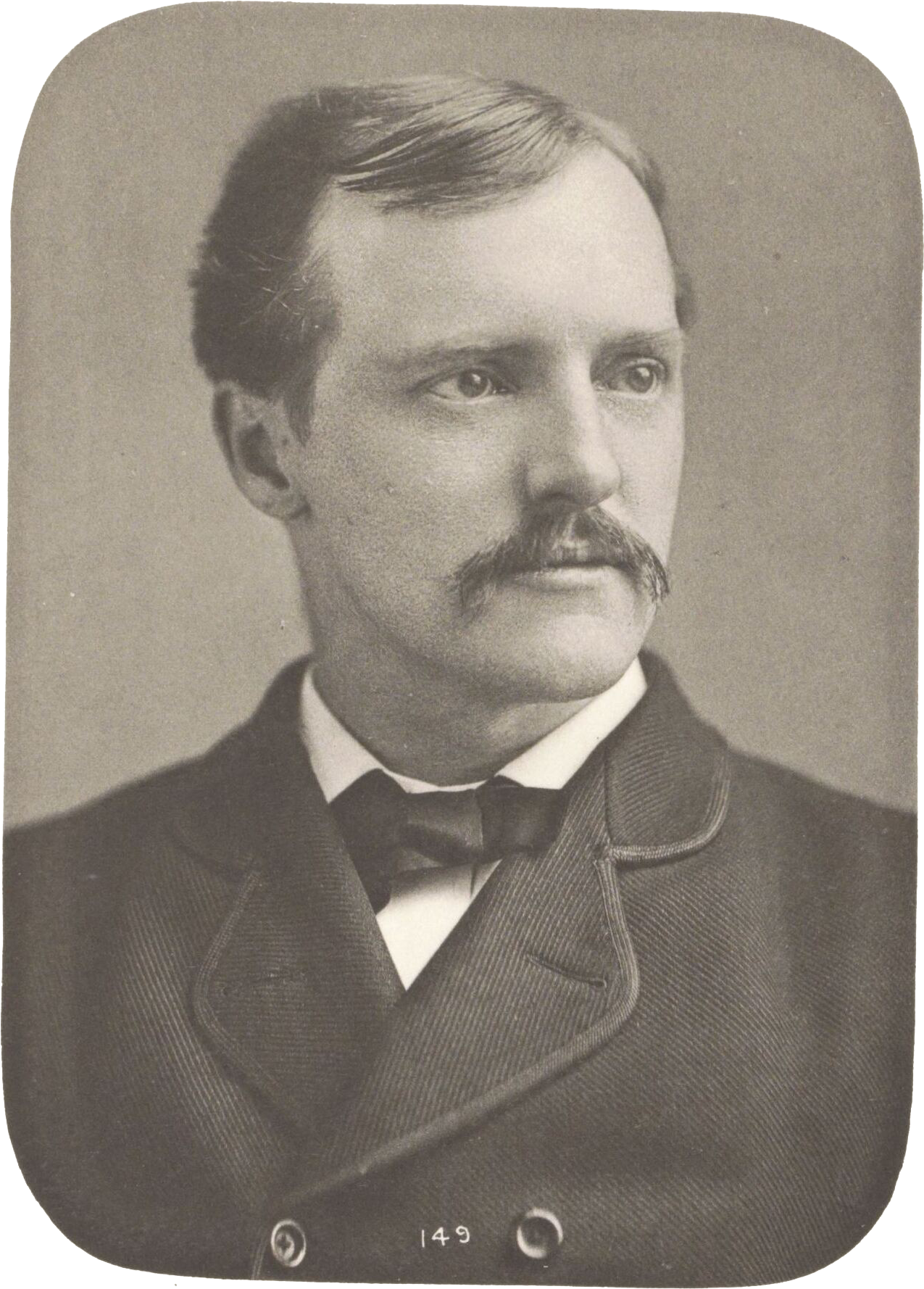
- Portrait of Dayton, c. 1872–1882

Postmaster of New York City
- In office 1893–1897
- Preceded by: Cornelius Van Cott
- Succeeded by: Cornelius Van Cott

Member of the New York State Assembly from the 23rd district
- In office 1881–1882
- Preceded by: Nathaniel B. Terpeny
- Succeeded by: Leroy Bowers Crane

Personal details
- Born: Charles Willoughby Dayton; October 3, 1846 Brooklyn, New York, U.S.
- Died: December 7, 1910 (aged 64) Manhattan, New York, U.S.
- Resting place: Green-Wood Cemetery
- Party: Democratic
- Spouse: Laura A. Newman (m. 1874)
- Relations: Andrew Adams
- Children: 2
- Education: College of the City of New York; Columbia University
- Occupation: Politician; postmaster; lawyer; judge
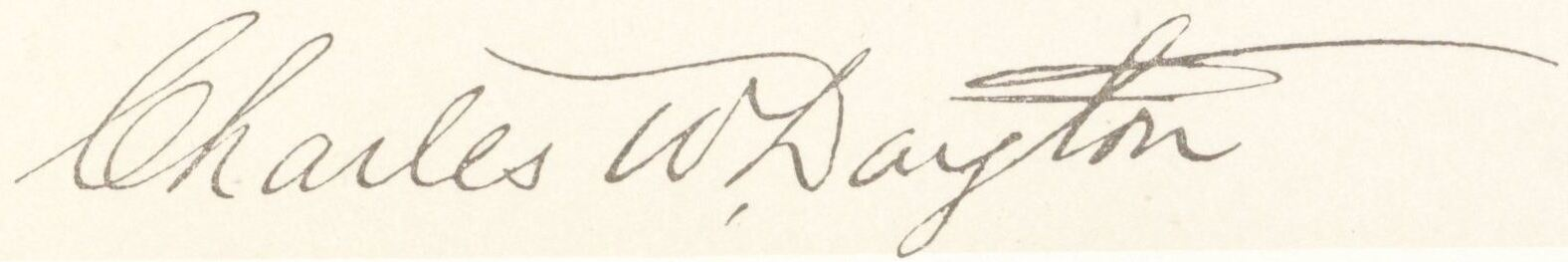
- Signature

Charles Willoughby Dayton (October 3, 1846 – December 7, 1910) was an American politician and judge from New York. He was a member of the New York State Assembly in 1881. He was postmaster of New York City from 1893 to 1897. He was elected judge of the New York Supreme Court in 1906.

== Early life ==
Charles Willoughby Dayton was born on October 3, 1846, in Brooklyn, New York, to Abraham Child Dayton. His father was a writer. His father was a descendant of Connecticut politician and judge Andrew Adams. His paternal grandfather Charles Willoughby Dayton married a daughter of Francis Child, a Huguenot. His maternal grandfather David Tomlinson was a physician in Rhinebeck. At an early age, his family moved to New York City. He attended public and private schools in New York City. He entered the Free Academy (later the College of the City of New York) in 1861. He left college to enter a law office and later graduated from Columbia Law School in 1868. He was admitted to the bar in 1868.

== Career ==
Dayton practiced law in New York City. He was a member of the bar in New York City and the state of New York. His office was on William Street in New York City. He was counsel and director of the Twelfth Ward Bank and the Empire City Savings Bank. In 1885, he was counsel of the Erie Railroad. He was also director of the United States Life Insurance Company.

Dayton was a Democrat. He wrote speeches for George B. McClellan in 1864 and gave a speech that year in White Plains for McClellan. He ran for New York State Assembly in 1878 and 1879, but lost. He served in the New York State Assembly, representing the 23rd district, in 1881. He served on the judiciary, claims, and public lands committees. He passed a primary election law. He declined re-nomination. In 1882, he organized the Harlem Democratic Club and served as secretary of the Citizens' Reform Movement in 1882. With the Citizens' Reform Movement, he supported Allan Campbell's campaign for mayor of New York City. He was delegate to the state Democratic conventions and served as an elector of Grover Cleveland and secretary of the Electoral College in 1884. He gave speeches during Cleveland's 1884, 1888, and 1892 campaigns in New York and other states. In 1889, he served on the Continental Committee of the Washington Inauguration. In the 1880s, he was opposed to Tammany Hall, but by around 1891, he was allied with the political organization.

In 1893, Dayton was appointed by President Cleveland as postmaster of New York City. He later resigned the role on May 22, 1897. He introduced a system of carrying mail on streetcars. He was elected as a member of the New York Constitutional Convention of 1894. In 1897, he ran as the Democratic nominee for controller. He was a delegate to the 1904 Democratic National Convention. In 1906, he was elected on a Democratic–Independence League ticket as judge of the New York Supreme Court.

Dayton was trustee of the Church of the Puritans, Harlem Library, and Harlem Law Library. He was president of the Board for the Improvement of Park Avenue above 106th street. He was an incorporator of the Post-Graduate Medical School.

== Personal life ==
Dayton married Laura A. Newman, daughter of Rebecca (née Sanford) and John B. Newman, in 1874. His children were Charles W. Jr. and Laura. He was a member of the Harlem Democratic Club, Sagamore Club, Manhattan Club, Downtown and Players' Clubs, the American Geographical Society, Society of International Law, and the Sons of the Revolution.

Dayton died of pneumonia on December 7, 1910, at his home on Mount Morris Park in Manhattan. He was buried in Green-Wood Cemetery.

== Legacy ==
In 1897, postal employees erected a bronze bust of Dayton over a tablet that commemorated his postmastership.
