= Nathaniel B. Terpeny =

American politician (1809–1884)

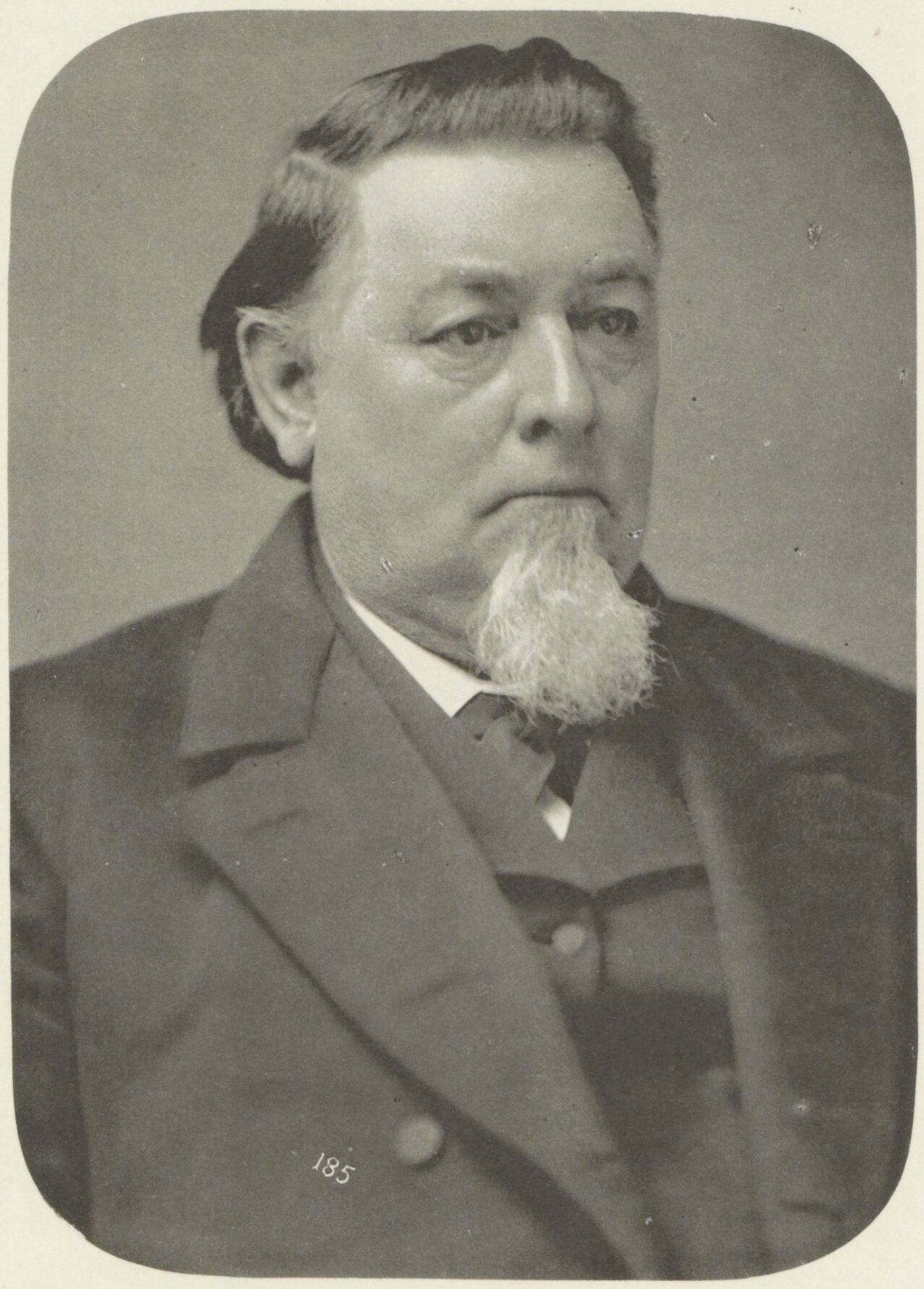
- Portrait of Terpeny, c. 1872–1882

Member of the New York State Assembly from the 23rd district
- In office 1880–1881
- Succeeded by: Charles W. Dayton

Personal details
- Born: February 25, 1809 Esopus, New York, U.S.
- Died: January 16, 1884 (aged 74)
- Party: Democratic
- Spouse: Margaret Murray (m. 1848; died 1879)
- Children: 1
- Occupation: Politician; builder
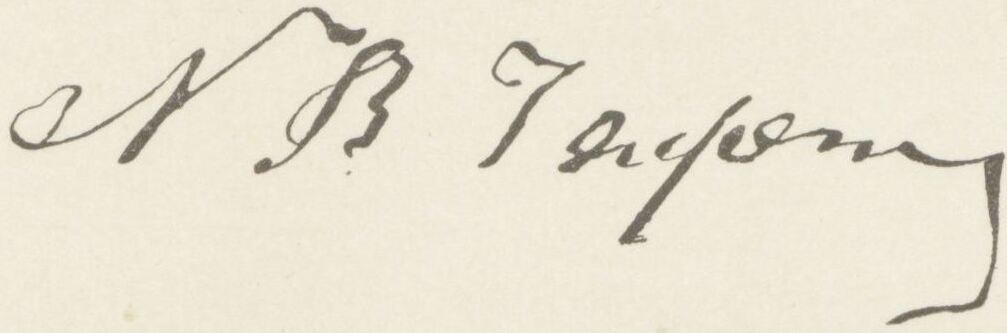
- Signature

Nathaniel B. Terpeny (February 25, 1809 – January 16, 1884) was an American politician from New York.

== Early life ==
Nathaniel B. Terpeny was born on February 25, 1809, in Esopus, New York. His father served in the War of 1812 and his grandfather served in the American Revolutionary War. He attended common schools and at the age of 16, he studied the builder's trade.

== Career ==
Terpeny was a builder in New York City for 40 years. He retired and then pursued an agricultural career.

Terpeny was a Democrat. He was the Democratic candidate for alderman-at-large of New York City in 1875 and he ran for the New York State Assembly in 1876. He was elected and served as a member of the New York State Assembly in 1880. He served on the trade and manufactures and the Indian affairs committees.

Terpeny was a member of the Washington Grays for seven years.

== Personal life ==
Terpeny married Margaret Murray, daughter of Hugh J. Murray, on February 22, 1848. Their daughter was Kate E. His wife died in 1879.

Terpeny died on January 16, 1884.
