= Leroy Bowers Crane =

American politician (1849–1916)

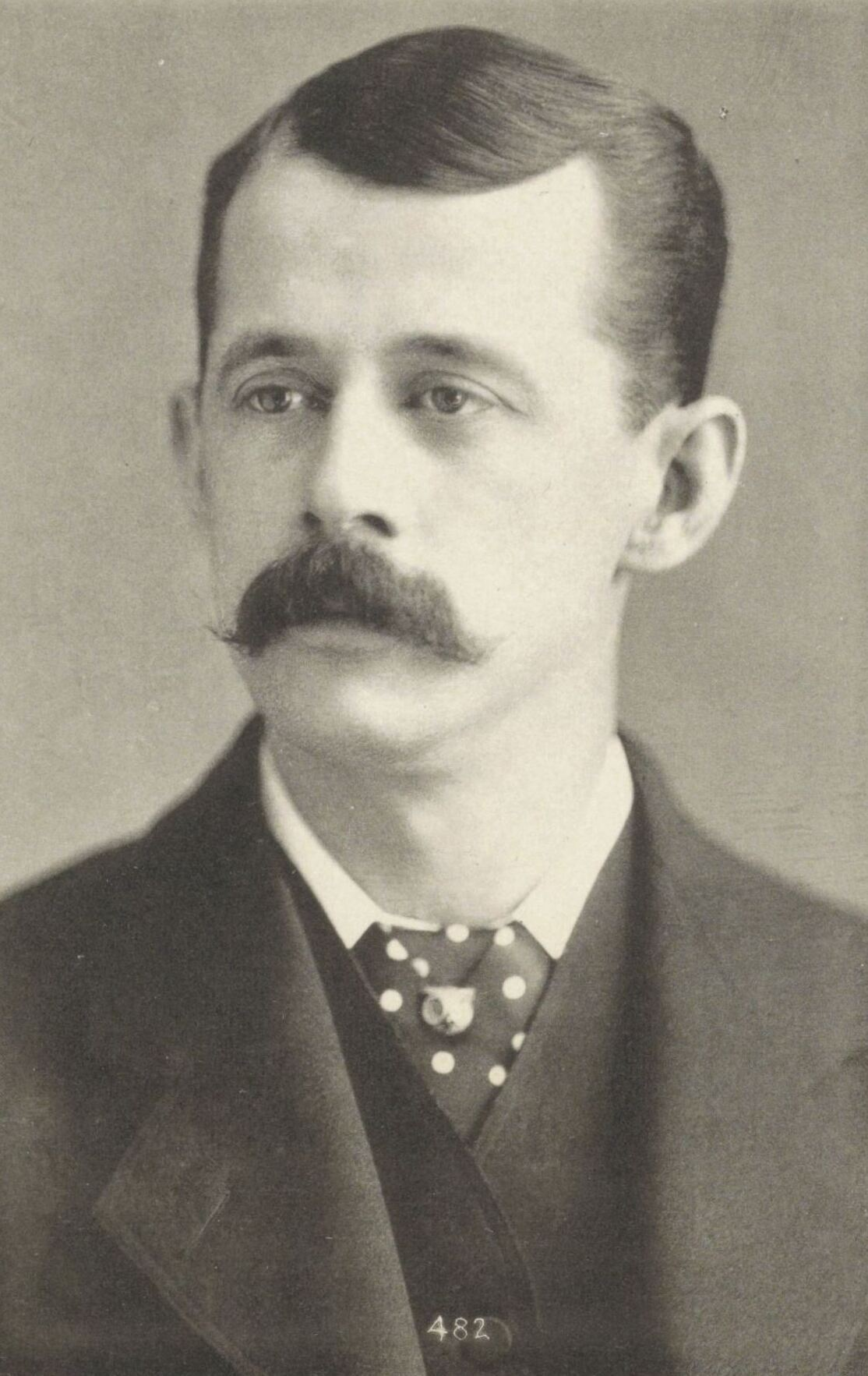
- Crane, c. 1870s–1880s

Member of the New York State Assembly from the 23rd district
- In office 1882–1883
- Preceded by: Charles W. Dayton
- Succeeded by: Daniel M. Van Cott

Personal details
- Born: June 9, 1849 Lowell, Massachusetts, U.S.
- Died: May 15, 1916 (aged 66) Schroon Lake, New York, U.S.
- Resting place: Kensico Cemetery
- Party: Republican
- Spouse: Louise B.
- Children: 5
- Occupation: Politician; businessman; lawyer; magistrate
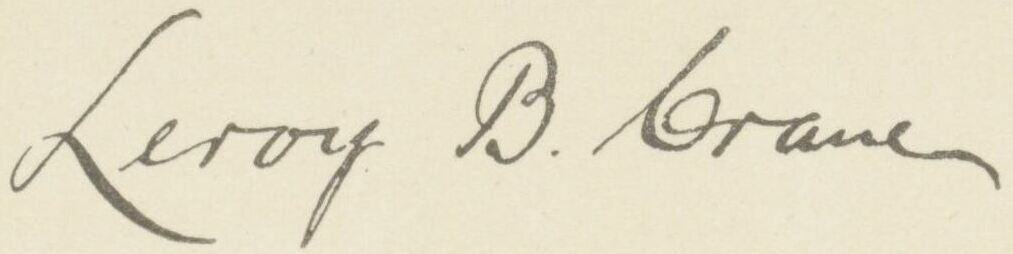
- Signature

Leroy Bowers Crane (June 9, 1849 – May 15, 1916) was an American politician and magistrate from New York. He served in the New York State Assembly from 1882 to 1883 and was a magistrate of New York City from 1895 to 1911.

== Early life ==
Leroy Bowers Crane was born on June 9, 1849, in Lowell, Massachusetts. He attended common schools in Lowell. At the age of 12, he with his father served in the 6th Massachusetts Militia Regiment.

In 1865, Crane moved to New York City and worked as an errand boy for H.B. Claflin & Company. He remained there until he began the study of law in 1870. He was later admitted to the bar.

== Career ==
Crane was a Republican. From 1882 to 1883, he served two terms in the New York State Assembly, representing Harlem and the 23rd district. He was a member of the canals and public health committees. He helped pass the elevated railroad five cent fare bill which was later vetoed by Governor Grover Cleveland. In 1883, he lost his re-election to Democratic candidate Daniel M. Van Cott. In 1884, he ran on an independent ticket and was endorsed by Theodore Roosevelt. He lost the election to Jacob A. Cantor.

Crane was president of the Sugar Coated Yeast Company. It had a big plant on upper Second Avenue.

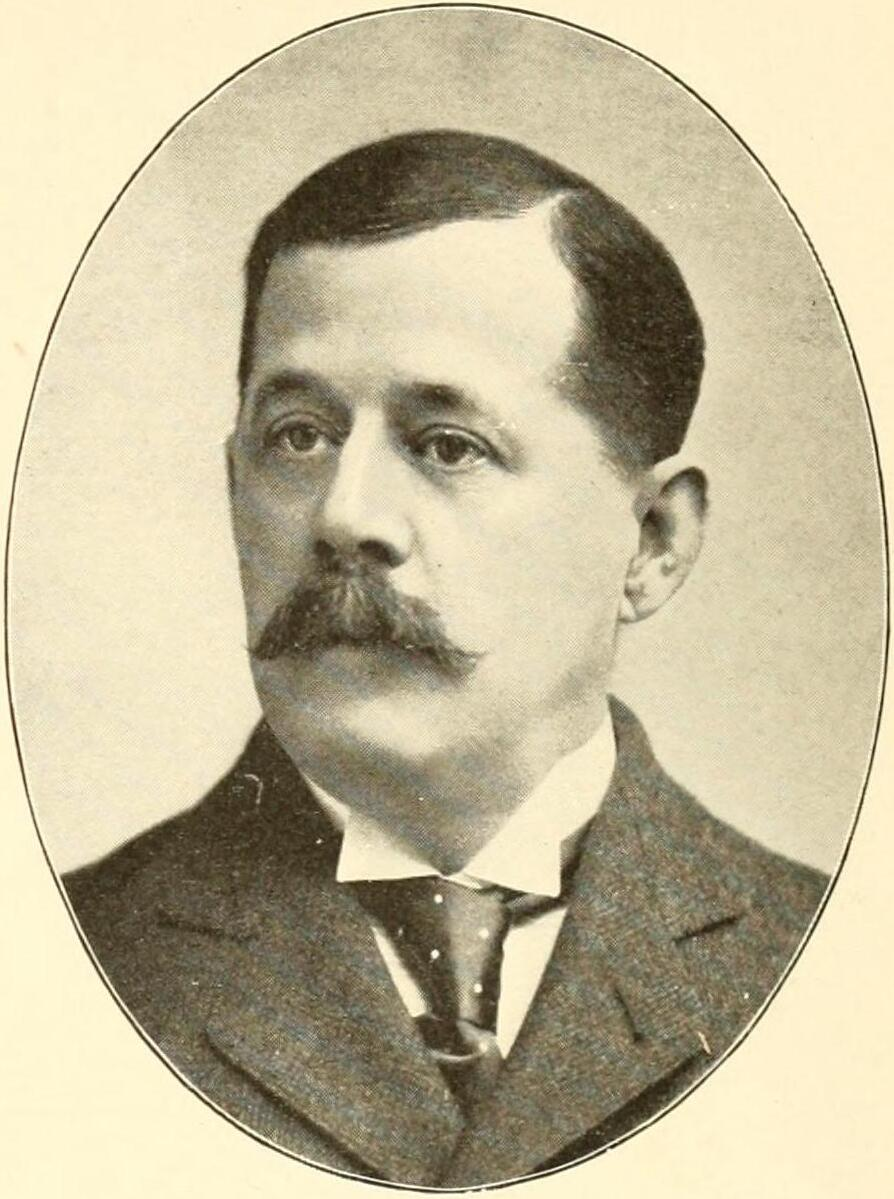
Crane in an 1899 publication

On July 1, 1895, Crane was appointed by mayor William Lafayette Strong as magistrate. He served on the West Side Court. In 1906, he was criticized by the appellate division for committing Joseph A. Farley, a real estate dealer, to prison without any warrant, but the case did not come to trial. From 1909 to 1911, he left the bench due to illness. Due to his inability to serve during his illness, he retired from the bench. During his tenure on the bench, he criticized mayor George B. McClellan Jr. He remarked about McClellan and the Sharkey Athletic Club, "if we had a real mayor in the City Hall with a little brain and backbone instead of the little man now there, these clubs could not exist. But with that little man there, the politicians have a hold on everything and their pull controls the city". He also remarked that Theodore A. Bingham was the best commissioner the city has had, but that politicians hedged his efforts. In 1912, he was mentioned as a potential Republican candidate for mayor of New York City.

== Personal life ==
Crane married Louise B. They had a son and four daughters, including Clara L., Mrs. A. J. Dueth, Mrs. E. R. MacKenzie, and Mrs. P. H. Parry.

Crane died on May 15, 1916, at his summer home on Schroon Lake, New York. He was buried in Kensico Cemetery.
