= Hinderaker =

Hinderaker is a surname. Notable people with the surname include:

- Eric Hinderaker (born 1959), American historian
- Ivan Hinderaker (1916–2007), American educator and academic administrator
- John C. Hinderaker (born 1968), American judge
