= Cornelius Van Cott =

Major League Baseball owner and political figure in New York City

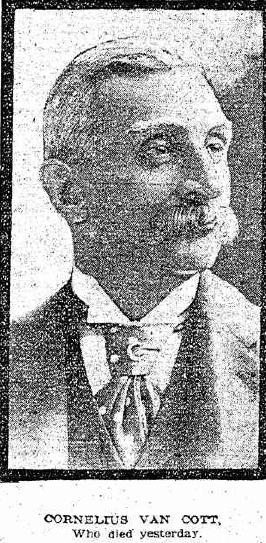
- Van Cott in the New-York Tribune of October 26, 1904
- Born: February 12, 1838; Manhattan, New York, U.S.
- Died: October 25, 1904 (aged 66); Manhattan, New York, U.S.
- Occupations: Owner of the New York Giants (1893–1894); Member of the New York State Senate (1888–1889); Postmaster of New York City (1889–1893; 1897–1904)
- Relatives: Daniel M. Van Cott (cousin)

Cornelius C. Van Cott (February 12, 1838 – October 25, 1904) was the owner of the New York Giants of the National League for two years in the 1890s. He later was a member of the New York State Senate and served two terms as Postmaster of New York City.

== Biography ==
Van Cott was born on February 12, 1838, to Richard Gabriel Van Cott and Caroline Case. In 1860, he married Fanny Thompson. As a youth, Van Cott worked in a print shop for the American Tract Society. He subsequently held other positions, including vice-president of Etna Fire Insurance. His cousin was Daniel M. Van Cott.

In January 1893, Van Cott purchased the New York Giants franchise from John B. Day; in January 1895, he sold the franchise to Andrew Freedman. Van Cott was a member of the New York State Senate, representing the 8th District in 1888 and 1889. On May 1, 1889, Van Cott took office as Postmaster of New York City; he was succeeded by Charles W. Dayton on June 5, 1893; Van Cott then returned to office on May 12, 1897, and remained in office until his death.

Van Cott died on October 25, 1904, at his temporary residence at 163 West 86th Street, in Manhattan, reportedly of heart disease.

New York State Senate
Preceded by Thomas C. Dunham	New York State Senate; 8th District; 1888–1889	Succeeded by Lispenard Stewart
