= List of Postmasters of New York City =

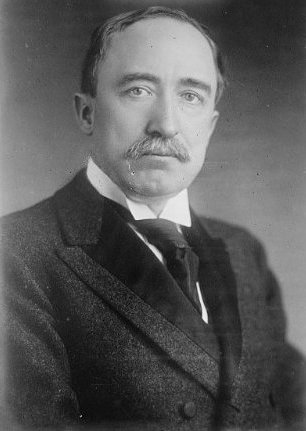
William Russell Willcox circa 1915-1916

A post office may have operated in New York City as early as 1687. The United States Postal Service has no information on New York's postmasters prior to the year 1775. The New York City Post Office is first mentioned in Hugh Finlay's journal dated 1773 which lists Alexander Colden as the postmaster of New York City. Other sources indicate that Colden may have served as postmaster as early as 1753. Postmasters are appointed by the President of the United States.

| Name | Title | Date appointed | Notes and references |
|---|---|---|---|
| Alexander Colden | Postmaster | | The date of appointment is not known. |
| John Holt | Postmaster | | The date of appointment is not known. He is listed as postmaster in a document written by Mary Katherine Goddard. |
| Ebenezer Hazard | Postmaster | October 5, 1775 | He was appointed on October 5, 1775 according to his letter to Congress on November 14, 1776. He was later appointed as the United States Postmaster General. |
| William Bedlow | Postmaster | April 5, 1784 | The date of appointment is not known. He submitted financial accounts for the post office from April 5, 1784 through October 1789. |
| Sebastian Bauman | Postmaster | February 16, 1790 | The date is for his first financial accounts to Congress. His appointment date is not known. |
| Josias Ten Eyck | Postmaster | January 1, 1804 | The date is for his first financial accounts to Congress. His appointment date is not known. |
| Theodorus Bailey | Postmaster | January 2, 1804 | He died in office. |
| Samuel Laurence Gouverneur | Postmaster | 11/19/1828 | |
| Jonathan I. Coddington | Postmaster | 07/05/1836 | |
| Col. James Lorimer Graham | Postmaster | 03/14/1842 | |
| Robert Hunter Morris | Postmaster | 05/03/1845 | He was later the Mayor of New York City |
| William Vermilye Brady | Postmaster | 05/14/1849 | He was later the Mayor of New York City |
| Isaac Vanderbeck Fowler | Postmaster | 04/01/1853 | |
| John Adams Dix | Postmaster | 05/17/1860 | |
| William B. Taylor | Postmaster | 01/16/1861 | |
| Abram Wakeman | Postmaster | 03/21/1862 | |
| James Kelly | Postmaster | 09/19/1864 | |
| Patrick Henry Jones | Postmaster | 04/27/1869 | |
| Thomas Lemuel James | Postmaster | 03/17/1873 | He was later appointed as the United States Postmaster General. |
| Henry G. Pearson | Postmaster | 03/22/1881 | |
| Cornelius Van Cott | Postmaster | 04/05/1889 | |
| Charles W. Dayton | Postmaster | 06/05/1893 | |
| Cornelius Van Cott | Postmaster | 05/12/1897 | This was his second non-consecutive term. He died in office. |
| William Russell Willcox | Postmaster | 12/07/1904 | He resigned office to become the head of the Public Service Board. |
| Edward M. Morgan | Postmaster | August 14, 1907 | He was postmaster for the first airmail delivery. |
| Thomas Gedney Patten | Postmaster | 03/16/1917 | |
| Edward M. Morgan | Postmaster | 06/23/1921 | |
| John J. Kiely | Acting Postmaster | 01/10/1925 | |
| John J. Kiely | Postmaster | 01/22/1925 | He was promoted from Acting Postmaster to Postmaster. |
| Albert Goldman | Acting Postmaster | 08/31/1934 | |
| Albert Goldman | Postmaster | 01/16/1935 | He was promoted from Acting Postmaster to Postmaster. Albert Goldman was the first Jewish postmaster of New York City. |
| George M. Bragalini | Acting Postmaster | 04/30/1952 | |
| James B. Tunny | Acting Postmaster | 03/31/1953 | |
| Colonel Harold Riegelman | Acting Postmaster | 05/04/1953 | |
| John H. Sheehan | Acting Postmaster | 08/04/1953 | |
| Robert H. Schaffer | Acting Postmaster | 08/16/1954 | |
| Robert H. Schaffer | Postmaster | 08/02/1955 | He was promoted from Acting Postmaster to Postmaster. |
| Howard Coonen | Acting Postmaster | 05/31/1957 | |
| Robert K. Christenberry | Acting Postmaster | 06/03/1958 | |
| Robert K. Christenberry | Postmaster | 09/21/1959 | He was promoted from Acting Postmaster to Postmaster. |
| Eugene Pinson | Acting Postmaster | 07/01/1966 | |
| John R. Strachan | Acting Postmaster | 11/04/1966 | |
| John R. Strachan | Postmaster | 06/26/1967 | He was promoted from Acting Postmaster to Postmaster. |
| George J. Hass | Officer-In-Charge | 07/16/1971 | |
| Thomas V. Flanagan | Officer-In-Charge | 07/01/1972 | |
| John R. Strachan | Postmaster | 12/09/1972 | This was his second non-consecutive term. |
| George F. Shuman | Officer-In-Charge | 01/13/1979 | |
| Paul E. Donovan | Officer-In-Charge | 02/16/1979 | |
| George F. Shuman | Postmaster | 05/19/1979 | He was promoted from Officer-In-Charge to Postmaster following the intervening appointment of Paul E. Donovan. |
| John M. Nolan | Postmaster | 01/05/1985 | |
| William J. Dowling | Officer-In-Charge | 03/03/1989 | |
| John F. Kelly | Postmaster | 11/04/1989 | |
| Sylvester Black | Postmaster | 01/09/1993 | |
| Vinnie Malloy | Postmaster | 12/19/1998 | |
| Robert A. Daruk, Sr. | Officer-In-Charge | 02/28/2007 | |
| Robert A. Daruk, Sr. | Postmaster | 03/17/2007 | He was promoted from Officer-In-Charge to Postmaster. |
| William J. Schnaars | Postmaster | January 31, 2009 | |
| Lorraine G. Castellano | Postmaster | October 24, 2009 | |
| Aracelis M. Osorio | Officer-In-Charge | July 3, 2010 | |
| Robert J. Brown | Postmaster | October 23, 2010 | |
| Elvin Mercado | Officer-In-Charge | December 13, 2013 | |
| Elvin Mercado | Postmaster | March 8, 2014 | He was promoted from Officer-In-Charge to Postmaster. |
| Kevin J. Crocilla | Postmaster | February 20, 2016 | |
