= Nicholas R. O'Connor =

American politician (1849–1920)

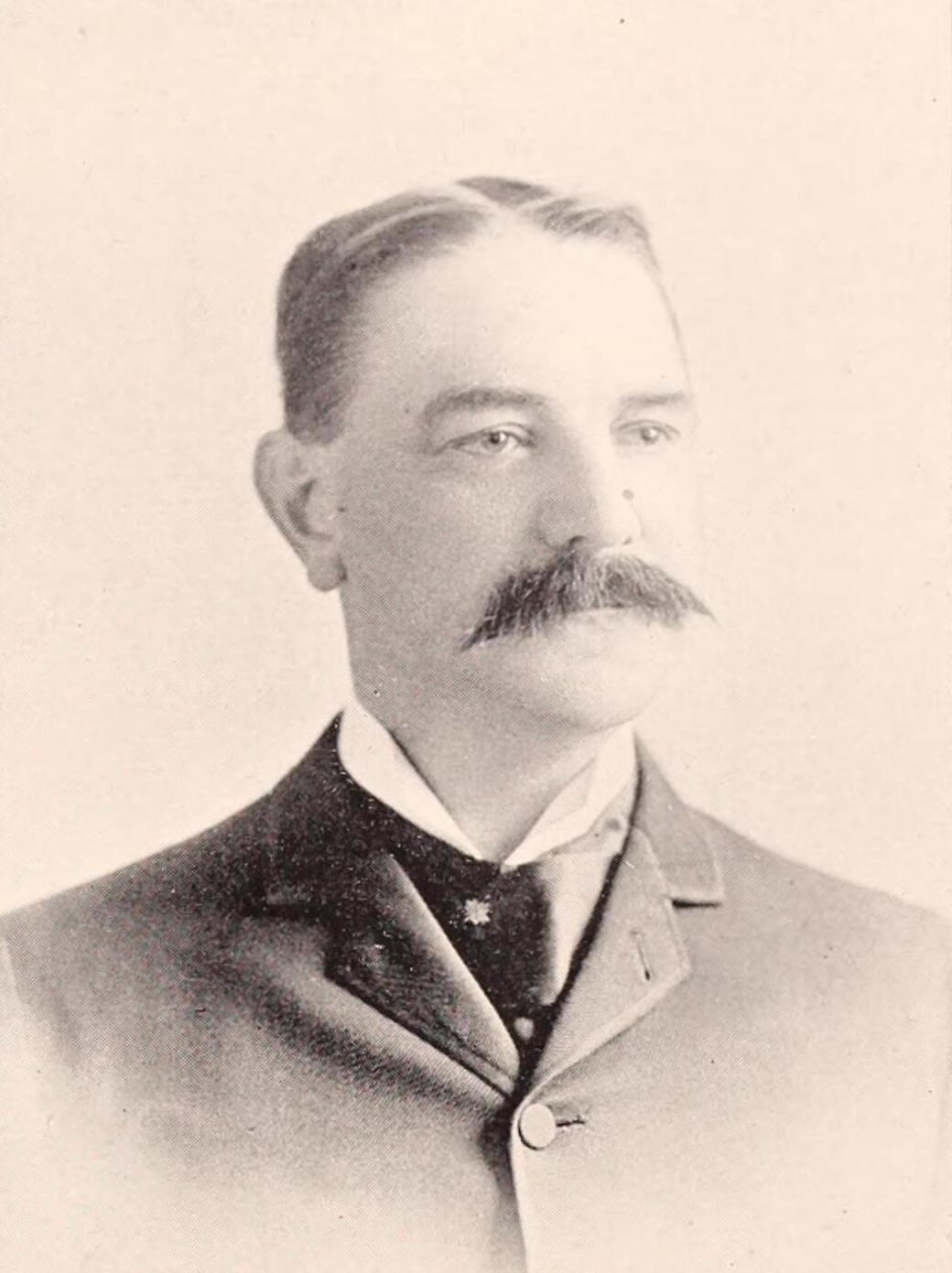
- O'Connor in an 1893 publication

Member of the New York State Assembly from the 23 district
- In office 1888–1889
- Preceded by: Jacob A. Cantor
- Succeeded by: Frank B. Arnold

Personal details
- Born: March 18, 1849 New York City, New York, U.S.
- Died: November 28, 1920 (aged 71) Manhattan, New York, U.S.
- Resting place: Milford, Connecticut, U.S.
- Spouse(s): Mary E. Bryant (died 1896) Alice Pegram (m. 1898)
- Education: Yale University
- Occupation: Politician; civil servant

Nicholas R. O'Connor (March 18, 1849 – November 28, 1920) was an American politician from New York.

== Early life ==
Nicholas R. O'Connor was born on March 18, 1849, in New York City, to John C. O'Connor. His father was a merchant that worked on South Street in New York City. He graduated from General Russell's Military School. He graduated from a two-year course from Sheffield Scientific School (Yale University) in 1867.

== Career ==
At 21, O'Connor was elected an assistant alderman of New York City. He served in the New York State Assembly, representing the 23rd district, in 1888.

O'Connor then served in the New York State Department of Public Works. He served as chief inspector of the department for 27 years. He also served as city auctioneer. He had business associations with gas and electrical enterprises.

== Personal life ==
O'Connor married Mary E. Bryant, daughter of Dorothy C. and Jonas Bryant, of North Anson, Maine. Her great-uncle was William Cullen Bryant. She died in 1896. He married Alice Pegram on January 1, 1898. He was a member of the Tammany Society, Yale Alumni Association, Jerome Park Club, Sagamore Club, Democratic Club, and Oval Club. He was chairman of the Tammany Hall District Committee for the 27th district.

O'Connor died on November 28, 1920, at his home on Broadway, Manhattan. He was buried in Milford, Connecticut.
