= Marie Henriette =

Marie Henriette or Maria Henrietta may refer to:

- Marie Henriette of Austria (1836–1902), Queen of the Belgians as the wife of Leopold II
- Archduchess Maria Henrietta of Austria (1883–1956), Prince of Hohenlohe-Schillingsfürst

== See also ==
- Marie Henriette (disambiguation)
- Henriette Marie (disambiguation)
