= Henrietta Marie Colden =

Henrietta Marie Bethune Colden (1745–1800) was a Scottish salon holder from Isle of Man.

== Early life ==
Henrietta Marie Bethune was born in Scotland in 1745 and lived in the Isle of Man before she and her husband emigrated to America.

== Personal life ==
She married Richard Nicholls Colden (1845–1777) in the Isle of Man while he was with his regiment there. Colden served for the 42nd Royal Highlanders and died in 1777. Richard was the eldest son of Elizabeth (née Nicholls) Colden and Alexander Colden, a politician, and a grandson of Cadwallader Colden, a colonial governor of the Province of New York. Together, they were the parents of two sons before his death:

- Cadwallader R. Colden, who became the editor of the U.S. Sporting Magazine, published in New York, in 1835–6.
- Alexander Colden.

After Colden's death, she returned to Scotland with her sons where they were educated at a school near Lancaster, England before returning to the United States after the Revolutionary War.

In 1798, Henrietta sold a farm at New Lots in Kings County, New York to Sir James Hall of Dunglass in Scotland.

=== Literary interests ===
Colden was known for her different literary interests. On March 14, 1783, she wrote a letter to Benjamin Franklin, complaining about the British Government after her husband had died from a fever in 1777. On July 16, 1792, she wrote a letter to Henry Knox, the first United States Secretary of War, to Kean respecting payment to the Ohio Company.
