= Isaac Siegel =

American politician (1880–1947)

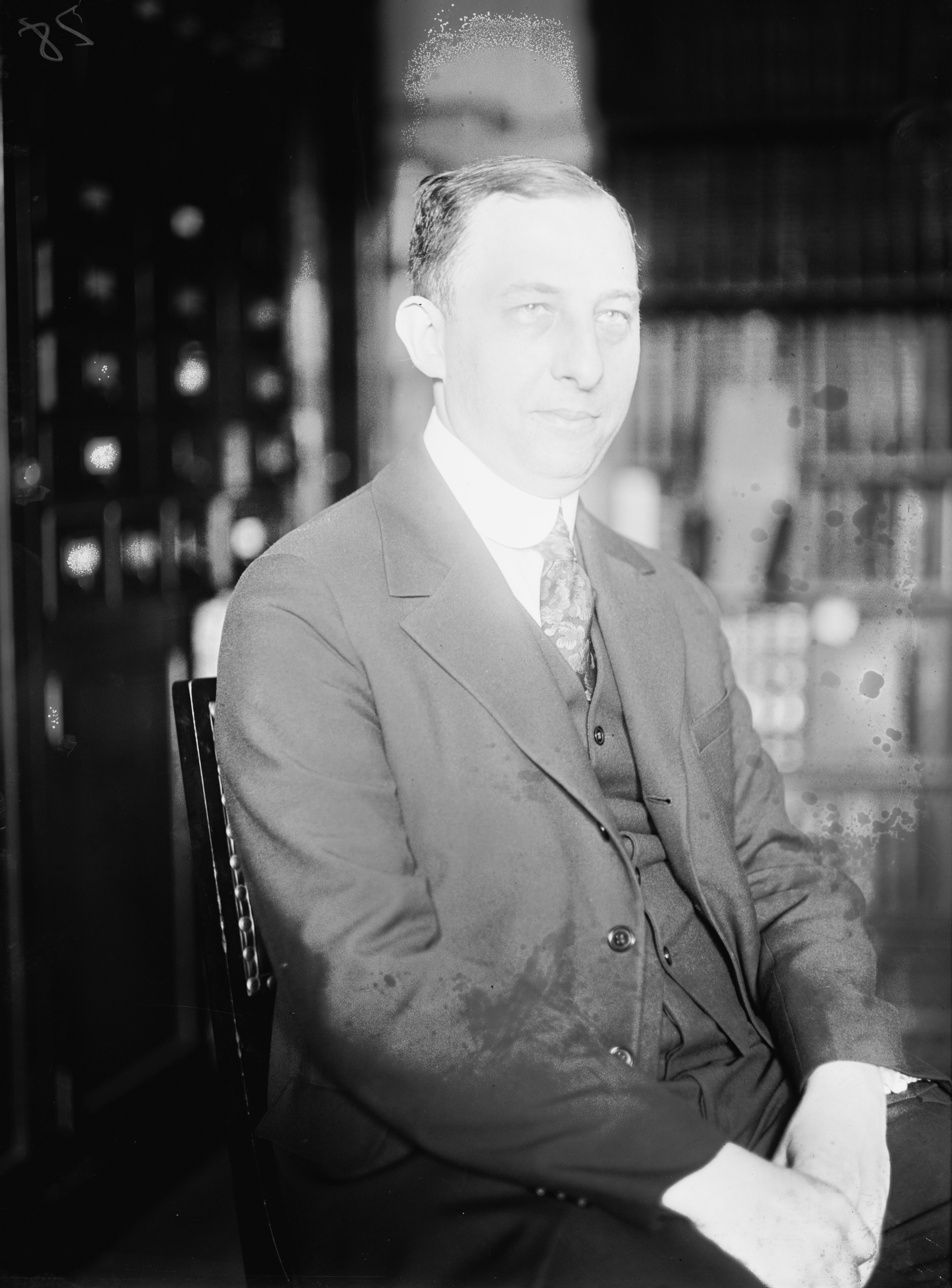
- Siegel in 1921

Member of the U.S. House of Representatives from New York's 20th district
- In office March 4, 1915 – March 3, 1923
- Preceded by: Jacob A. Cantor
- Succeeded by: Fiorello La Guardia

Personal details
- Born: April 12, 1880 New York City, US
- Died: June 29, 1947 (aged 67) New York City, US
- Party: Republicans

Isaac Siegel (April 12, 1880 – June 29, 1947) was a United States representative from New York.

== Biography ==
He was born in New York City and attended the public schools. Siegel graduated from New York University School of Law in 1901 and was admitted to the bar on May 26, 1902. He commenced practice in New York City thereafter and was appointed special deputy attorney general for the prosecution of election frauds in 1909 and 1910. Siegel was elected as a Republican to the Sixty-fourth and to the three succeeding United States Congresses (March 4, 1915 – March 3, 1923).

He was chairman of the Committee on the Census (Sixty-sixth and Sixty-seventh Congresses). He was not a candidate for renomination in 1922. During the First World War, he was a member of the overseas commission which visited France and Italy during July and August 1918. He was also delegate to the Republican National Conventions in 1916, 1920, 1924, and 1936.

On September 14, 1940, Siegel was appointed to the bench and served as justice of the domestic relations court of New York City until his death. He died in an accidental fall from a window in his New York City apartment. He is interred at Union Field Cemetery in Ridgewood, NY.

== See also ==
- List of Jewish members of the United States Congress

U.S. House of Representatives
Preceded by Jacob A. Cantor	Member of the U.S. House of Representatives from New York's 20th congressional district 1915–1923	Succeeded by Fiorello H. LaGuardia
