= The History of the Five Indian Nations =

1727 book by Cadwallader Colden

The History of the Five Indian Nations is a book by the natural scientist Cadwallader Colden, who served as the governor of the Province of New York. It was first published in New York in 1727 and a second edition was published in London in 1747.

== Production history ==
History was rooted in a pamphlet Colden published in 1724 called Papers Relating to the Indian Trade, although Papers and the first edition of History diverged widely. Papers was an appendix to the second edition of History, which was "very greatly enlarged" as compared to the first.

== Contents ==
History's full title reads "History of the Five Indian Nations Depending on the Province of New-York in America", and as such the book accounts for the Mohawks, Oneidas, Onondagas, Cayugas, and Senecas (later editions included the Tuscarora). Colden writes of the nations' customs, traditions, governmental structures, as well as historical studies of battles, treaties, and sachems. The book's main subject is Haudenosaunee (Iroquois) participation in North American wars in the late 17th century. Contemporary historians have used History both as a chronicle of events in 17th-century North America and as a chronicle of the views of an "eighteenth-century British administrator".

== Works cited ==
- Colden, Cadwallader (2017). The History of the Five Indian Nations Depending on the Province of New-York in America: A Critical Edition. Cornell University Press. ISBN 978-1-5017-1390-3. OCLC 1144208254.
- Hinderaker, Eric (2011). The Two Hendricks: Unraveling a Mohawk Mystery. Harvard University Press. ISBN 978-0-674-03579-9. OCLC 318875573.
- Wroth, Lawrence C. (1969). An American Bookshelf, 1755. Arno Press. OCLC 1244222237.
