= Daniel M. Van Cott =

American politician (died 1903)

Member of the New York State Assembly from the 23rd district
- In office 1884–1885
- Preceded by: Leroy Bowers Crane
- Succeeded by: Jacob A. Cantor

Personal details
- Died: December 26, 1903 (aged 55) Harlem, New York, U.S.
- Party: Democratic
- Spouse: Claudine A. Barnes (m. 1870; died 1877)
- Relations: Cornelius Van Cott (cousin)
- Children: 4
- Occupation: Politician; lawyer

Daniel M. Van Cott (died December 26, 1903) was an American politician and lawyer from New York. He served in the New York State Assembly in 1884.

== Early life ==
Daniel M. Van Cott was born to William H. Van Cott. His father was a judge and pioneer of organized baseball in New York. His cousin was postmaster Cornelius Van Cott.

== Career ==
Van Cott practiced law at 25 Chambers Street in New York City for 25 years.

Van Cott was a Democrat. He served as a member of the New York State Assembly, representing district 23 in 1884.

== Personal life ==
Van Cott married Claudine A. Barnes, daughter of G. W. Barnes, of Mount Vernon, New York, on November 2, 1870. His wife died in 1877. He had five children. He was a member of Hiawatha Lodge, No. 434 of the Free and Accepted Masons. He served as master from 1878 to 1880 and deputy grand master of the district.

Van Cott died of pneumonia on December 26, 1903, aged 55, at his home on West 128th Street in Harlem.
