= 1957 New York City mayoral election =

- November 5, 1957
- Registered: 2,442,888
- Turnout: 2,224,054; 91.04% (▼3.65 pp)
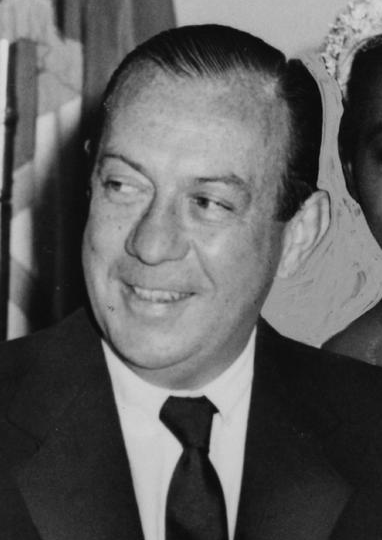

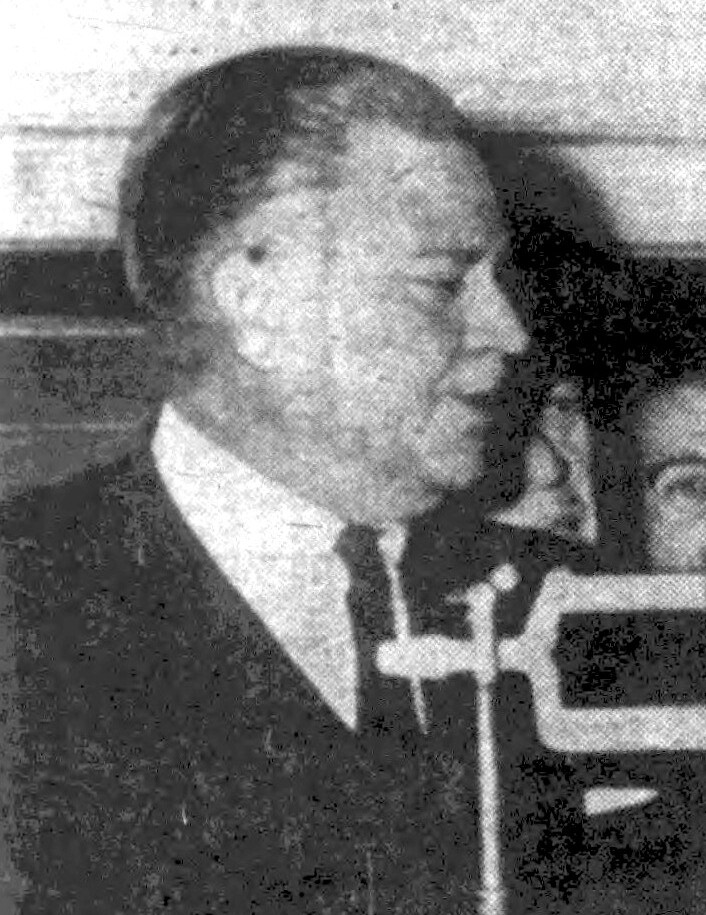
Candidate	Robert F. Wagner Jr.	Robert K. Christenberry
Party	Democratic	Republican
Alliance	Liberal; City Fusion
Popular vote	1,509,775	585,768
Percentage	69.2%	26.9%
- Results by Borough; 60–70% 70–80%
Mayor before election
Robert F. Wagner, Jr.
Democratic
Elected Mayor
Robert F. Wagner, Jr.
Democratic

The 1957 New York City mayoral election occurred on Tuesday, November 5, 1957. Incumbent Democratic mayor Robert F. Wagner Jr. won re-election for a second term in office. Wagner defeated the Republican nominee, businessman Robert K. Christenberry.

== Democratic nomination ==
Incumbent Mayor Robert F. Wagner, Jr. chose to run for reelection to a second term. Wagner received the backing of the powerful Tammany Hall political machine.

== Liberal nomination ==
There was debate within the Liberal Party over their strategy for the 1957 elections. Since the middle of the 1950s, there was increasing pressure for the party to fold and merge with the Democrats. Factions within the party believed the Democrats had evolved past machine politics, meaning there was no need for continued existence of the Liberals. Ultimately the view of party father David Dubinsky prevailed; the Liberals would endorse worthy Democrats and Republicans but maintain a separate structure. The Liberals voted by 280 to 23 on July 10 that they would endorse Wagner for Mayor while running their own candidates for city council races. This was met with criticism by the pro-Liberal New York Post, which labelled the endorsement as "surrender". Wagner also appeared on the City Fusion, an anti-Tammany party, ballot line.

== Republican nomination ==
On June 27, the Republican party nominated Robert K. Christenberry at the Ambassador Hotel, of which Christenberry was the president. Though Christenberry had never held elected office, he was a friend of former governor Thomas Dewey and had been appointed by Dewey to the state Athletic Commission. Christenberry had also served as Vice Consul in Vladivostok and the Dominican Republic as well as the American representative at the inauguration of Paraguayan President Alfredo Stroessner.

== General election ==
=== Candidates ===
- Vito P. Battista, architect and founder of the Institute of Design and Construction (United Taxpayers)
- Robert K. Christenberry, president of the Ambassador Hotel (Republican)
- Joyce Cowley, single mother and Trotskyist activist (Socialist Workers)
- Eric Hass, Socialist Labor Party nominee for President of the United States in 1952 and 1956 (Industrial Government)
- Robert F. Wagner Jr., incumbent mayor since 1954 (Democratic and Liberal)

=== Campaign ===
From the start of the campaign, Wagner was favored for reelection. Though Christenberry was praised by Democrats like Eleanor Roosevelt for his energy and knowledge of the issues, even traditionally Republican newspapers were not optimistic about his chances. Despite this, President Eisenhower and Vice President Nixon appeared with and endorsed Christenberry. Former Governor Dewey endorsed Christenberry just four days before the election in a letter. A Democratic internal poll in August indicated Wagner would win reelection by 350,000 votes and a second poll in September indicated an even larger victory. These polls found Wagner had support from every ethnic group in New York, though Wagner was strongest among Jews, with 75% of Jewish voters supporting him.

At the start of his campaign, Christenberry attacked Mayor Wagner, saying he had "a record of indecision" and a "failure to face up to problems". Christenberry centered his campaign around a plan to hire 5,000 new police officers to reduce crime, the reduction of graft and corruption in city government, and halting New York City's population loss. Throughout the campaign, Christenberry attacked Wagner on the issue of crime and claimed that the administration had "miserably failed" on that issue.

During the campaign the Democrats spent $300,000, Republicans spent $75,000, and Liberals spent $75,000.

Vito Battista, a Republican architect, ran on the third party "United Taxpayers" ticket in opposition to Mayor Wagner's policies on taxation and social services. On WNYC's Campus Press Conference, Battista stated that his party stood for "lower taxes or the intelligent distribution of the tax dollar in running local city government; the elimination of waste, the elimination of inefficiency, and the proper planning of our community." Battista also railed against communist influence in the city government, and alleged that there were communists living in New York City public housing.

=== Results ===
Wagner received 69.23% of the vote to Christenberry's 26.86%, a landslide Democratic victory margin of 42.37%. Wagner swept all five boroughs, breaking 60% of the vote in Queens and Staten Island, and breaking 70% of the vote in Manhattan, Brooklyn, and the Bronx.

New York City Mayoral Election, 1957
Party	Candidate	Votes	%
Democratic	Robert F. Wagner, Jr.	1,284,856	58.91
Liberal	Robert F. Wagner, Jr.	217,941	9.99
City Fusion	Robert F. Wagner, Jr.	6,978	0.32
Total	Robert F. Wagner, Jr. (incumbent)	1,509,775	69.23
Republican	Robert K. Christenberry	585,768	26.86
United Taxpayers	Vito P. Battista	67,266	3.08
Socialist Workers	Joyce Cowley	13,453	0.62
Socialist Labor	Eric Hass	4,611	0.21
Total votes		2,180,873	100
Democratic hold			

=== Results by borough ===
	Party	Manhattan	The Bronx	Brooklyn	Queens	Richmond [Staten Is.]	Total	%
Robert F. Wagner, Jr.	Democratic - Liberal - Fusion	316,203	316,299	494,078	341,212	40,983	1,508,775	69.2%
Robert F. Wagner, Jr.	Democratic - Liberal - Fusion	73.8%	76.6%	75.1%	64.1%	64.7%	1,508,775	69.2%
Robert Christenberry	Republican	112,173	96,726	163,427	191,061	22,381	585,768	26.9%
Robert Christenberry	Republican	26.2%	23.4%	24.9%	35.9%	35.3%	585,768	26.9%
subtotal		428,376	413,025	657,505	532,273	63,364	2,094,543	96.1%
others							85,355	3.9%
T O T A L							2,179,878	

== Works cited ==
- Soyer, Daniel (2021). Left in the Center: The Liberal Party of New York and the Rise and Fall of American Social Democracy. Cornell University Press. ISBN 9781501759888. JSTOR 10.7591/j.ctv1hw3x50.2.
