= Julius Helfand =

American politician

Chairman of the New York State Athletic Commission
- In office 1955–1959
- Preceded by: Robert K. Christenberry
- Succeeded by: Melvin Krulewitch

Member of the New York House of Representatives from the 6th Kings district
- In office 1935–1935
- Preceded by: Samson Inselbuch
- Succeeded by: Robert J. Crews

Personal details
- Born: December 11, 1902 Brooklyn
- Died: August 17, 1987 (aged 84) West Palm Beach, Florida
- Party: Democratic
- Education: New York University School of Law
- Occupation: Jurist

Julius Helfand (December 11, 1902 – August 17, 1987) was an American politician and attorney who served as the assistant Brooklyn District Attorney in charge of organized crime prosecutions, chairman of the New York State Athletic Commission, and a New York state court judge.

== Early life ==
Helfand was born on December 11, 1902, in Brooklyn and attended Boys High School. He graduated from the New York University School of Law in 1923 and was admitted to the bar in 1924.

== New York State Assembly ==
In 1934, Helfand was elected to the New York State Assembly by 15 votes. He sponsored an amendment to the New York State tax law which prohibited educational institutions from denying admission to qualified applicants because of race, color, or creed. He was defeated in 1935 by Republican Robert J. Crews.

== Assistant District Attorney ==
In 1937, Helfand became a deputy assistant Brooklyn District Attorney. He was promoted to assistant district attorney in 1940 and was made the chief of the homicide division in 1946. In 1949 he became District Attorney Miles F. McDonald's chief organized crime prosecutor. In 1951 Helfand led the prosecution of Harry Gross, a bookmaker whose $20 million a year operation was protected by members of the New York Police Department and city government. Gross was convicted and sentenced to 12 years in prison. The investigation also led to the conviction of 10 police officers and the resignation of New York City Police Commissioner William O'Brien. Helfand also led an investigation into conditions on Brooklyn's waterfront, which led to convictions for payroll padding, usury, kickbacks, and theft of union funds.

== 1953 election ==
In 1953, Helfand ran for President of the New York City Council on the ticket of Mayor Vincent R. Impellitteri. Impellitteri, Helfand, and the third member of their ticket, Comptroller were challenged for the Democratic nomination by the Tammany Hall-backed ticket led by Robert F. Wagner Jr. Wagner's ticket was victorious, with Abe Stark defeating Helfand to 62% to 38% in the Democratic primary.

== New York State Athletic Commission ==
In 1955, Helfand was appointed chairman of the New York State Athletic Commission by Governor W. Averell Harriman. He spent much of his first year in office investigating the Boxing Guild of New York, a boxing manager's guild. On December 12, 1955, Helfand outlawed the guild, accusing it of conspiring to blackballing fighters who were not in the good graces of its members, having monopolistic power over television contracts, associating with underworld figure Frankie Carbo, and requiring out-of-state managers to pay the guild to work in the state. He and fellow commissioner Robert K. Christenberry gave the members until January 16, 1956, to quit the guild or have their license suspended or revoked. On January 5, 1956, the Guild's members voted unanimously to ignore Helfand's order and not disband. On January 7, the Guild was dealt a major blow when Al Weill, manager of world heavyweight champion Rocky Marciano, resigned. By Helfand's January 16 deadline, 59 of the 74 managers had resigned from the guild. Willie Gilzenberg and Tex Sullivan, who ran Boxing from St. Nicholas Arena, announced they would move their operations to the Baltimore Coliseum in response to Helfand's order. Maryland Governor Theodore McKeldin sided with Helfand and persuaded his state athletic commission to ban Gilzenberg and Sullivan. On February 26, 1956, the commission voted to revoke Gilzenberg and Sullivan's licenses. In 1956, the commission passed a rule requiring managers to submit itemized expense accounts to the board after every fight. Later that year the commission indefinitely banned former lightweight world champion Paddy DeMarco from fighting in New York for having a person with a criminal record as a manager. In 1959, Harriman's successor Nelson Rockefeller appointed Melvin Krulewitch to succeed Helfand as chairman. Helfand remained on the commission until his term expired in 1960.

== Judicial career ==
In 1961, Helfand was made a magistrate of the Brooklyn Felony Court. In 1963 he was promoted to acting justice of the New York Supreme Court. In 1967 he presided over one of the trials of George Whitmore Jr. He retired from the bench on January 31, 1972. Upon announcing his retirement, Helfand called for the legalization of gambling, the return of capital punishment, and the distribution of free narcotics.

== Later life ==
Helfand retired to West Palm Beach, Florida, where he died on August 17, 1987, at the age of 83.

New York State Assembly
Preceded by Samson Inselbuch	New York State Assembly; Kings County, 6th District; 1935	Succeeded by Robert J. Crews
