= Jacob A. Cantor =

American lawyer and politician (1854–1921)

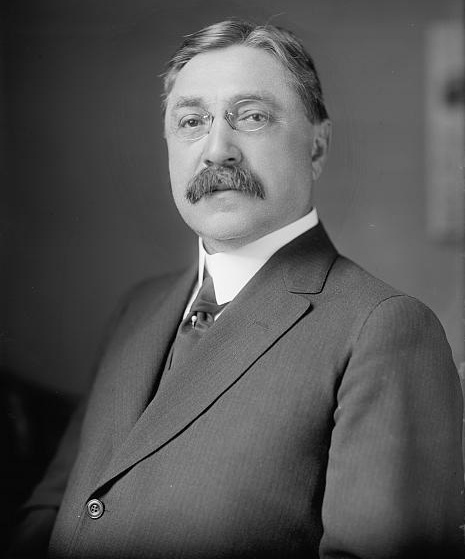
- Cantor, 1905–1921

Member of the U.S. House of Representatives from New York's 20th district
- In office November 4, 1913 – March 3, 1915
- Preceded by: Francis B. Harrison
- Succeeded by: Isaac Siegel

3rd Borough President of Manhattan
- In office January 1, 1902 – December 31, 1903
- Preceded by: James J. Coogan
- Succeeded by: John F. Ahearn

President pro tempore of the New York State Senate
- In office 1892–1893
- Preceded by: Jacob Sloat Fassett
- Succeeded by: Charles T. Saxton

Member of the New York State Senate
- In office January 1, 1888 – December 31, 1898
- Preceded by: William C. Traphagen
- Succeeded by: Thomas F. Donnelly
- Constituency: 10th district (1888–1893); 14th district (1894–1895); 20th district (1896–1898)

Member of the New York State Assembly from the 23rd district
- In office January 1, 1885 – December 31, 1887
- Preceded by: Daniel M. Van Cott
- Succeeded by: Nicholas R. O'Connor

Personal details
- Born: December 6, 1854 New York City, US
- Died: July 2, 1921 (aged 66) New York City, US
- Party: Democratic
- Spouse(s): Julia Lewenthal, Lydia Greenbaum
- Children: 3
- Education: City College of New York
- Occupation: Lawyer

Jacob Aaron Cantor (December 6, 1854 – July 2, 1921) was an American lawyer and politician from New York who served as a United States representative from 1913 to 1915.

== Early life and education ==
Cantor was born at 19 Second Street in New York, the son of Henry Cantor and Hannah Cantor, both natives of London. He was a reporter for the New York World from 1872 to 1877. At the same time, he studied law at the City College of New York, graduated in 1875.

== Family ==
His first wife, Julia Lewenthal Cantor, died on November 2, 1891. He later married Lydia Greenbaum on September 25, 1897, and the couple had three children: Margaret, Ruth, and John.

== Career ==
Cantor was admitted to the bar and commenced practice in New York City.

=== Early political career ===
He was a delegate to the 1884 Democratic National Convention. He was a member of the New York State Assembly (New York Co., 23rd D.) in 1885, 1886 and 1887. He was a member of the New York State Senate from 1888 to 1898, sitting in the 111th through 121st New York State Legislatures (all three 20th D.); and was President pro tempore from 1892 to 1893.

He was Borough President of Manhattan from 1902 to 1903, elected on the fusion ticket headed by Seth Low for Mayor of New York City, nominated by the anti-Tammany Hall Democrats, Republicans and the Citizens Union.

=== Congress ===
Cantor was elected as a Democrat to the 63rd United States Congress to fill the vacancy caused by the resignation of Francis Burton Harrison, and served from November 4, 1913, to March 3, 1915. He unsuccessfully contested the election of Isaac Siegel to the 64th United States Congress.

=== Later career and death ===
Afterwards he resumed the practice of law in New York City.

He was president of the New York City Department of Taxes and Assessments from 1918 until his death.

== Personal life ==
Cantor died at his home at 2345 Broadway, in Manhattan, and was buried at the Mt. Hope Cemetery in Hastings-on-Hudson, New York.

== See also ==
- List of Jewish members of the United States Congress

== Sources ==
- United States Congress. "Jacob A. Cantor (id: C000125)". Biographical Directory of the United States Congress.
- Political Graveyard
- Obit in NYT on July 3, 1921 (stating wrong years of his majority leadership)
- Obit of his first wife, in NYT on November 3, 1891

New York State Assembly
Preceded by Daniel M. Van Cott	New York State Assembly; New York County, 23rd District; 1885–1887	Succeeded by Nicholas R. O'Connor
New York State Senate
Preceded by William C. Traphagen	New York State Senate; 10th District; 1888–1893	Succeeded by Frank A. O'Donnel
Preceded by Clarence E. Bloodgood	New York State Senate; 14th District; 1894–1895	Succeeded by Thomas F. Grady
Preceded by Harvey J. Donaldson	New York State Senate; 20th District; 1896–1898	Succeeded by Thomas F. Donnelly
Political offices
Preceded by Jacob Sloat Fassett	President pro tempore of the State Senate; 1892–1893	Succeeded by Charles T. Saxton
Political offices
Preceded by James J. Coogan	Borough President of Manhattan; 1902-1903	Succeeded by John F. Ahearn
Preceded by Francis B. Harrison	Member of the U.S. House of Representatives from New York's 20th congressional district 1913–1915	Succeeded by Isaac Siegel
