= De Winton (disambiguation) =

De Winton refers to the engineering branch of the De Winton family and their Welsh locomotive factory.

De Winton may also refer to:

- De Winton, Alberta, a city in Canada named after another member of the family
  - De Winton/South Calgary Airport, the airport in that city
- RCAF Station De Winton

== Animals ==
- De Winton's shrew
- De Winton's golden mole
- De Winton's Long-eared Bat

== People with the surname ==
- Alice De Winton
- Dora De Winton
- Francis de Winton British army officer, administrator of Congo Free State.
- Frederick de Winton
- Henry de Winton (d. 1895)
- William Edward de Winton
- The De Winton family, a family from Wallsworth Hall in England
- Julia de Winton, also known as Julia Cecilia Stretton (1812-1878)
- Walter de Winton (d. 1840), also known as Walter Wilkins, husband of Julia
- Walter de Winton (d. 1901), also known as Sir Francis de Winton, son of Julia and Walter

== People with the middle name ==
- Winton Aldridge, complete name Rowland De Winton Aldridge
- Roger Winlaw, complete name Roger de Winton Kelsall Winlaw

== See also ==
- Wilkins (surname)
