= Andrew Adams (politician) =

American Founding Father and politician

- Born: January 7, 1736; Stratford, Connecticut, British America
- Died: November 26, 1797 (aged 61); Litchfield, Connecticut, U.S.
- Known for: signer of the Articles of Confederation

Signature
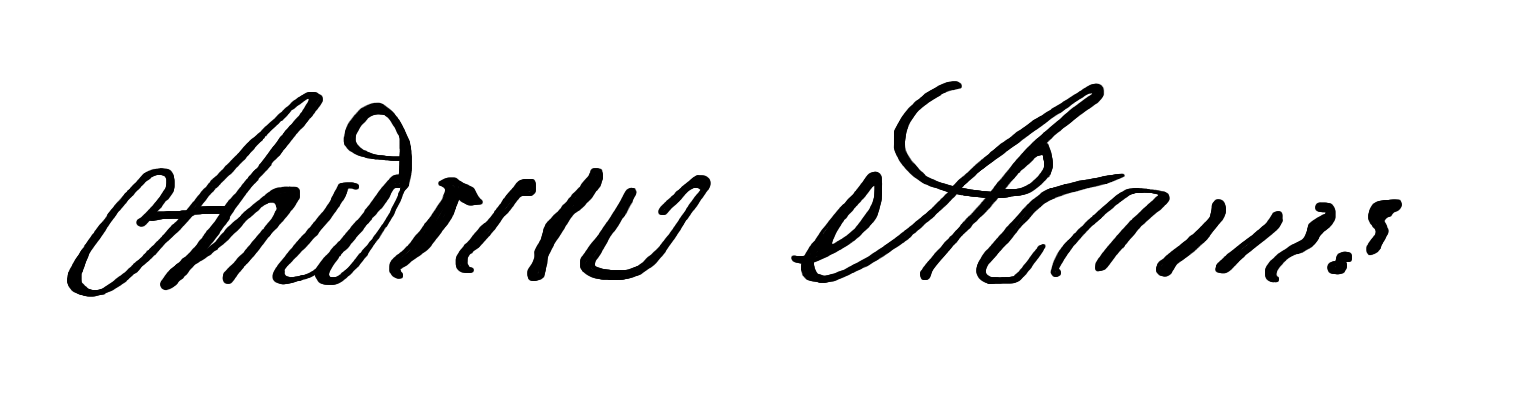

Andrew Adams (January 7, 1736 – November 26, 1797) was an American Founding Father, lawyer, jurist, and political leader in Connecticut during the nation's Revolutionary Era. As a delegate from Connecticut to the Second Continental Congress, he signed the Articles of Confederation in 1778. Following the war, he returned to his law practice, and in 1793, he was appointed Chief Justice of the Connecticut Supreme Court.

== Early life ==
Adams was born in Stratford, Connecticut, the son of Samuel and Mary Fairchild Adams. His father practiced law in Stratford and was a judge of Fairfield County. Adams attended Yale and graduated in 1760 before reading law with his father. He first practiced in Stamford. In 1772, he was named the king's attorney for Litchfield County. He moved to Litchfield in 1774 and made his home there for the rest of his life. He received the degree of LL.D. from Yale in 1796.

Adams was a Freemason. He was a member of St. Paul's Lodge No 11 in Litchfield, Connecticut.

== Political career ==
With the coming of the American Revolution, Adams was a member of Connecticut's Committee of Safety. He served in the Connecticut House of Representatives from 1776 until 1781 and was its speaker in 1779 and 1780. During the Revolutionary War, he served as a colonel in the Connecticut militia. He was appointed to the Second Continental Congress in 1778, when he signed the Articles of Confederation.

Adams was a leading player in both state and national politics. Governor of Connecticut Johnathan Trumbull wrote to congressmen Roger Sherman, Titus Hosmer and Adams on military movements in what is now known as the states of New England. Adams and Hosmer answered the governor's message, stating they would take the opportunity to write to Major Bigelow and keep an eye on the situation through organizing a Board of Treasury, but little progress had been made. After leaving the Continental Congress in 1778, a year later Adams had been named a member of the Connecticut executive council by Trumbull. Adams was also granted a seat as a judge that same year, and he was granted the position of chief justice in 1793, which was the position he kept till his death.
