= Coldenham, New York =

Coordinates: 41°31′32″N 74°09′11″W

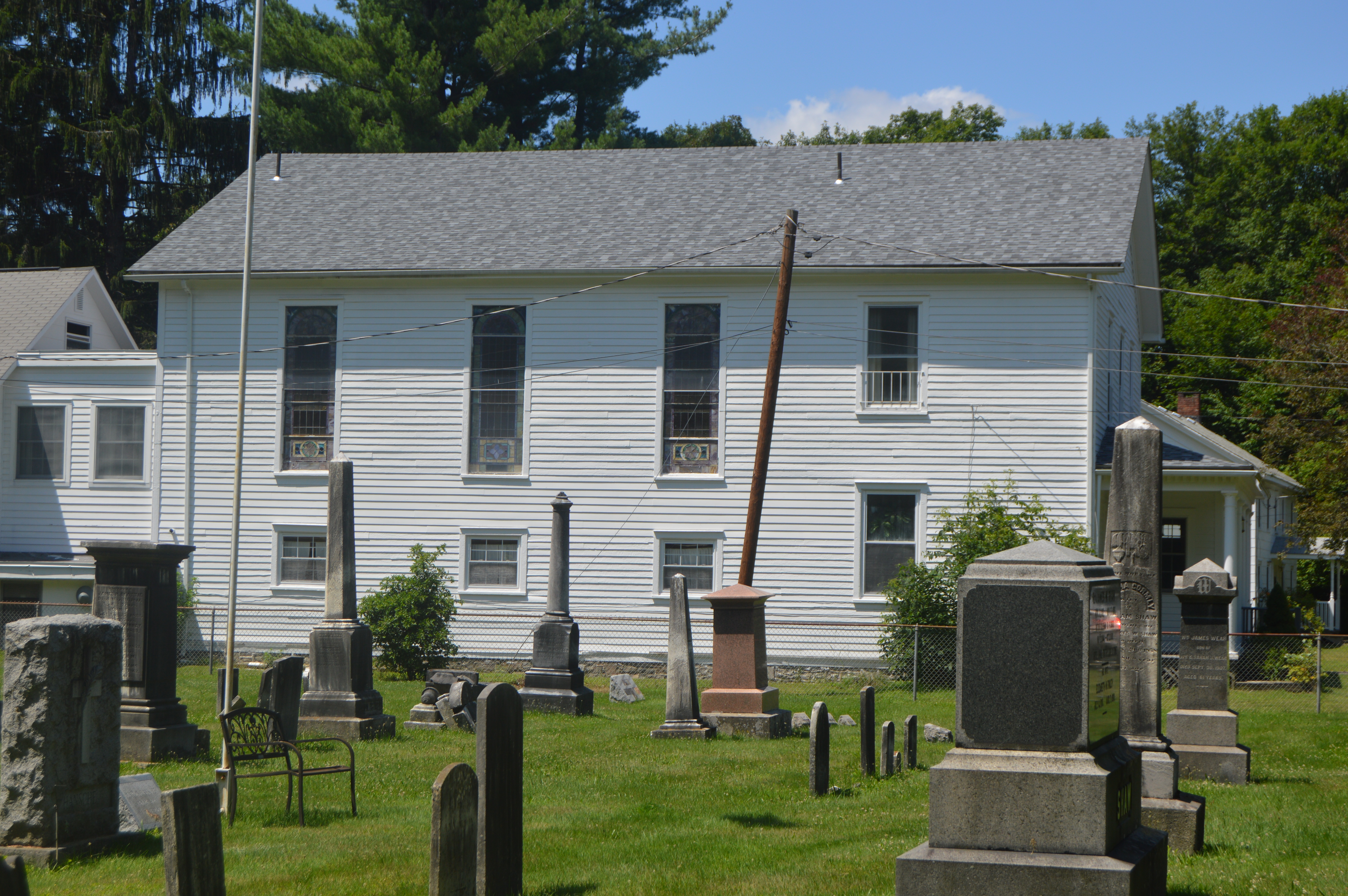
Coldenham Reformed Presbyterian Church

Coldenham is a hamlet in Orange County, in the U.S. state of New York.

== History ==
A post office called Coldenham was established in 1820, and remained in operation until 1905. The hamlet was named after Cadwallader Colden, an early settler.
