= Washington Grays =

Washington Grays may refer to:

- Washington Grays (song), American military march
- Washington Grays (Philadelphia), volunteer regiment
  - Washington Grays Monument, bronze statue representing the Philadelphia regiment
- Washington Homestead Grays, a major Negro league baseball team that played from c. 1912–1950
