= Winton (surname) =

Winton is a surname. Notable people with the surname include:

- Alan Winton (born 1958), Bishop of Thetford in the Church of England
- Alexander Winton (1860–1932), Scottish-born US businessman, founder of the Winton Motor Carriage Company
- Andrew Winton (born 1972), Australian musician
- Charlie Winton, American publisher
- Dale Winton (1955–2018), British TV presenter
- Doug Winton (1929–2006), Scottish footballer
- Francis Winton (c. 1829–1908), printer, publisher and politician in Newfoundland (now part of Canada)
- Gordon H. Winton, American politician
- Henry David Winton (1793–1855), English-born printer and newspaper owner in Newfoundland, father of the above
- Jane Winton (1905–1959), American actress, dancer, opera soprano, writer and painter
- Jeneverah M. Winton (1837–1904), American poet, author
- John Winton, pen name of British author John Pratt (1931–2001)
- Nan Winton, British journalist and broadcaster, first female national newsreader on BBC television (1960–1961)
- Nicholas Winton (1909–2015), British humanitarian, nicknamed the British Schindler
- Sabine Winton (born 1965), Australian politician
- Tim Winton (born 1960), Australian author

== See also ==
- Winton (disambiguation)
