= Henrietta Maria Moriarty =

British author and botanical artist

- Born: Henrietta Maria Godfrey; 1781; Romsey, Hampshire
- Died: 1842 (aged 60–61)
- Known for: botanical illustrator

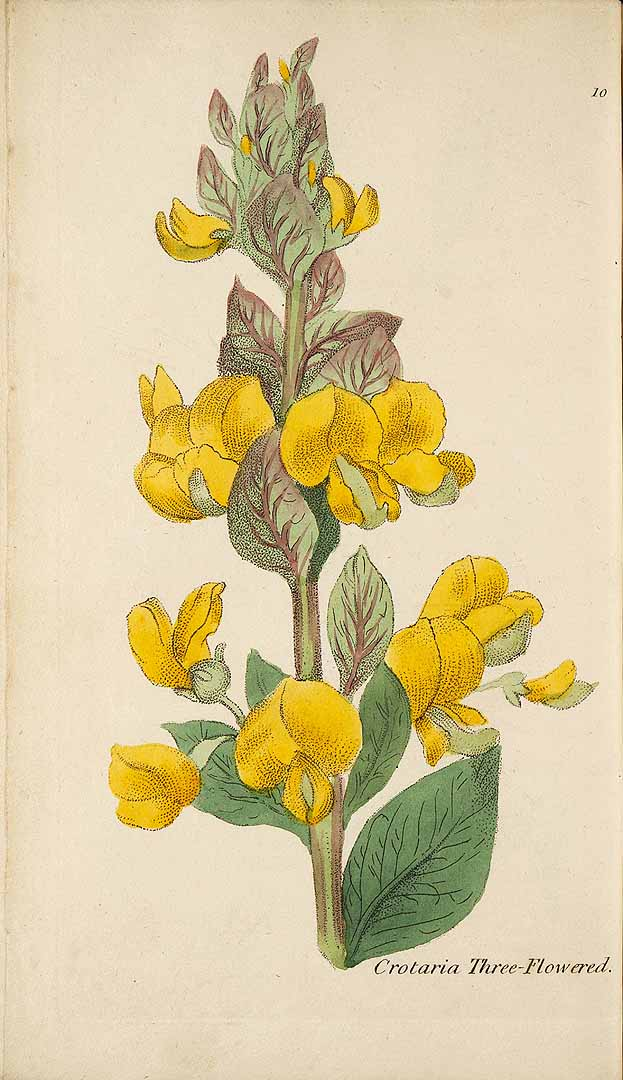
Rafnia triflora

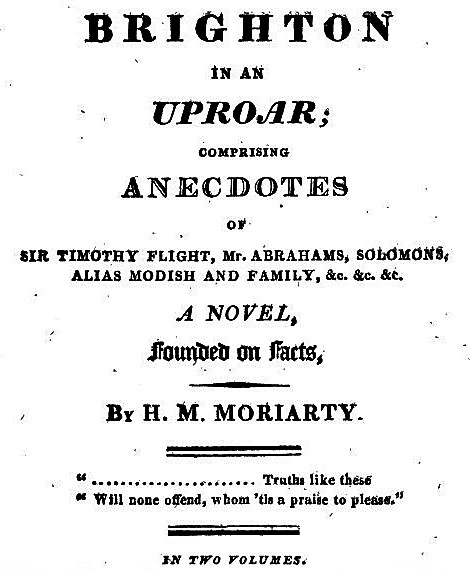

Henrietta Maria Moriarty (née Godfrey) (1781–1842) was an English novelist and botanical illustrator noted for some novels, Brighton in an Uproar Comprising Anecdotes... a Novel Founded on Facts (1812), Crim. Con. - A Novel, Founded on Facts (1812), A Hero of Salamanca: or, The Novice Isabel (1813), and Viridarium (1807), a collection of 50 coloured plates of greenhouse plants which went through two editions and was largely based on plates which appeared in Curtis’s Botanical Magazine.

== Life ==
Christened on 22 February 1781 at Romsey, Hampshire, she was the daughter of Major Benjamin Godfrey of the Inniskilling Dragoons and his wife Henrietta. On 9 July 1796, with the apparent consent of her widowed mother, she was married to Matthew Moriarty of Chatham, Kent, a Major in the Royal Marines. Matthew Moriarty was not a good provider and his early death left numerous debts and a destitute widow with 4 children. Henrietta took in two or three ladies as boarders in order to generate some income. Since drawing had always been one of her accomplishments, it was suggested that she publish a botanical work by subscription. Whilst living at Boley Hill near Rochester she produced a set of 50 plates which, for the greater part, were copied from Curtis’s Botanical Magazine, seemingly with no copyright objections and published in 1807.

The book’s subscription list was headed by Prince Augustus Frederick, Duke of Sussex, and was dedicated to Lady de Clifford, who also bought five copies. Sophia de Clifford was married to the 20th Baron de Clifford, Edward Southwell of Kings Weston, near Bristol, and after his death in 1786 she rented Nyn Park at Northaw before settling at a villa in Paddington. She collected rare and exotic plants, was often mentioned in botanical publications, and introduced a number of species previously unknown in England. She also was governess to Princess Charlotte, the daughter of George IV.

Other subscribers were the Margravine of Ansbach, Henry Peyto-Verney, 16th Baron Willoughby de Broke, and the Bishop of St Davids. Within two years she paid off all outstanding debts to the sum of four hundred and eighty pounds.

Next The London Gazette notes that "Henrietta Maria Moriarty, formerly of Brighton, Sussex and late of Delahay Street, Middlesex, widow, boarding-house-keeper" was confined at the King’s Bench prison in Surrey in December 1813. No further record of her has come to light except the 1841 census which notes her as being a ward of the Kensington Union Workhouse, and her death a year later.
