= Eric Hinderaker =

American historian (born 1959)

Professor Eric Hinderaker Prof.
- Born: 1959 (age 66–67); Watertown, South Dakota
- Citizenship: US
- Occupation: Professor of history
- Awards: Dixon Ryan Fox Prize

Academic background
- Education: Harvard University
- Thesis: (1991)

Academic work
- Discipline: History
- Sub-discipline: Early America
- Institutions: University of Utah

Eric A. Hinderaker (born 1959) is an American historian specializing in early America.

== Education and career ==
Hinderaker graduated from Watertown High School (South Dakota) in 1977. He received his B.A. from Augustana College (now Augustana University), an M.A. from the University of Colorado Boulder, and his Ph.D. from Harvard University in 1991. He has spent his subsequent career at the University of Utah, where he is currently Distinguished Professor of History.

He is the author or co-author of six books including, most recently, Boston’s Massacre (Cambridge, MA: Harvard University Press, 2017), which won the Society of the Cincinnati Prize and was a finalist for the George Washington Prize. His previous book, The Two Hendricks: Unraveling a Mohawk Mystery (Cambridge, MA: Harvard University Press, 2010), was awarded the Dixon Ryan Fox Prize by the New York Historical Association in 2009 and the Herbert H. Lehman Prize from the New York Academy of History in 2014.

He is also co-author, with Rebecca Edwards and Robert Self, of the textbook America’s History (Macmillan/Bedford St. Martin’s), the 10th edition of which was published in 2020.

== Publications ==
As sole author

- Elusive Empires: Constructing Colonialism in the Ohio Valley, 1673–1800 (New York: Cambridge University Press, 1997)
- The Two Hendricks: Unraveling a Mohawk Mystery (Cambridge, MA: Harvard University Press, 2010)
- Boston’s Massacre (Cambridge, MA: Harvard University Press, 2017)

With Peter C. Mancall

- At the Edge of Empire: The Backcountry in British North America (Baltimore: Johns Hopkins University Press, 2003)

With James Henretta, Rebecca Edwards, and Robert Self

- America’s History (Boston: Macmillan/Bedford St. Martin’s, 2014 [8th ed], 2017 [9th ed.])

Co-edited with Kirsten Fischer

- Colonial American History (Cambridge, MA: Blackwell Publishers, 2001)
