= Winton Manor =

Coordinates: 41°29′55.9″N 81°41′01.8″W

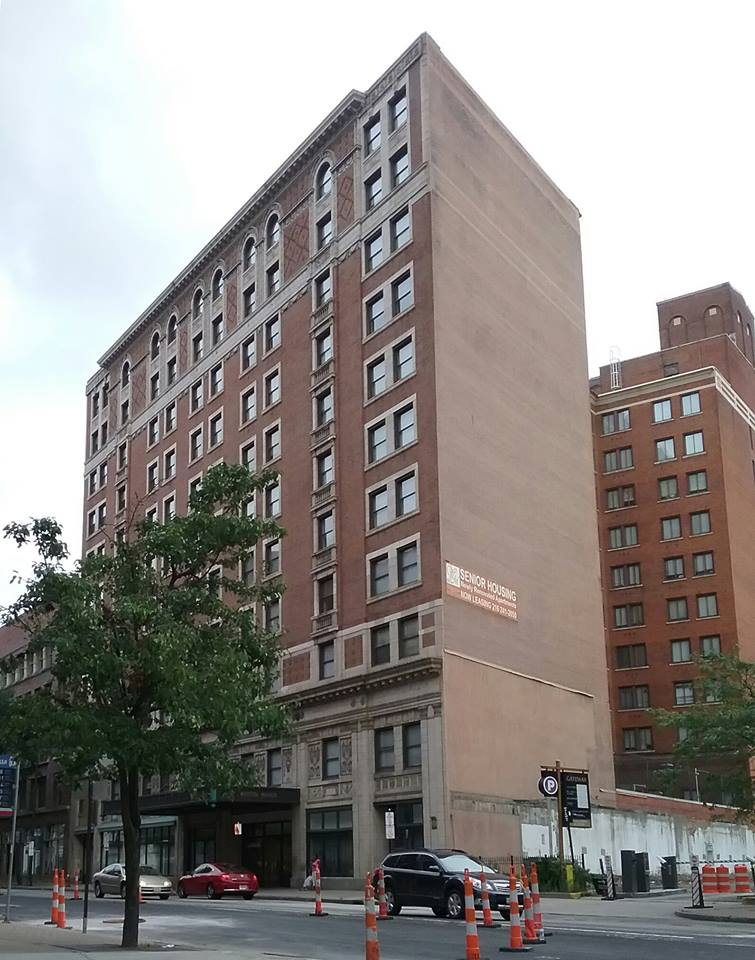
- Interactive map of the Winton Manor area
- Former names: Hotel Winton, The Carter Hotel, Carter Manor

General information
- Type: Residential
- Location: 1012 Prospect Avenue Cleveland, Ohio 44115 United States
- Construction started: 1915
- Completed: 1916

Height
- Roof: 45.41 m (149 ft)

Technical details
- Floor count: 11

Design and construction
- Architect: Nelson Max Dunning

The Winton Manor is a high-rise senior living apartment building on Prospect Avenue in the Playhouse Square district of downtown Cleveland. It used to be a grand hotel. It was opened in 1916 as the Hotel Winton.

== The Design ==
The Winton was designed by Nelson Max Dunning of Chicago.

== Closing and reopening ==
In 1931, the name was changed to the Carter Hotel and operated until the 1960s, having to close after a major fire. The building is now a low-income housing property for senior citizens. This is partly due to its placement next to a major public transportation route.

== See also ==
- Chicago School (architecture)
