= George C. Whipple =

American microbiologist and sanitary engineer

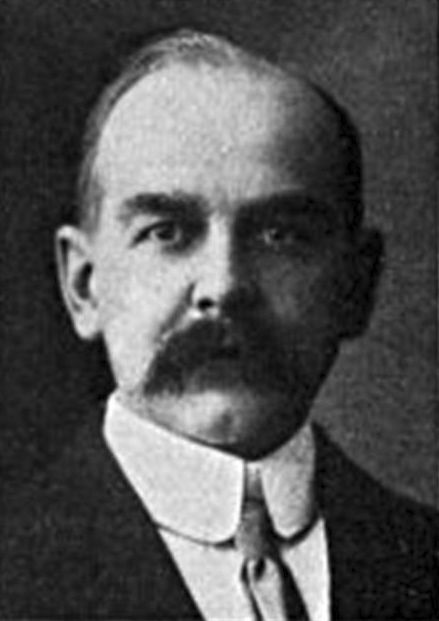
- George C. Whipple, Harvard University
- Born: March 2, 1866; New Boston, New Hampshire
- Died: November 27, 1924 (aged 58); Cambridge, Massachusetts
- Education: BS, Massachusetts Institute of Technology, 1889
- Occupations: Microbiologist and sanitary engineer
- Known for: Cofounder of the Harvard School of Public Health
- Awards: Water Industry Hall of Fame, American Water Works Association, 1973.

George Chandler Whipple (March 2, 1866 – November 27, 1924) was an American civil engineer and an expert in the field of sanitary microbiology. His career extended from 1889 to 1924 and he is best known as a co-founder of the Harvard School of Public Health. Whipple published some of the most important books in the early history of public health and applied microbiology.

== Early life and education ==
Whipple was born in 1866 in the small town of New Boston, New Hampshire, which is located a few miles due west of Manchester, New Hampshire. He spent most of his childhood in the Chelsea suburb of Boston where his father ran a hardware store. He graduated from the Massachusetts Institute of Technology in 1889 with a Bachelor of Science degree in civil engineering. While a student at MIT, Whipple was profoundly influenced by William T. Sedgwick. He also interacted with Dr. Thomas M. Drown and fellow students George W. Fuller and Allen Hazen. Later, Whipple undertook postgraduate work at the Stevens Institute of Technology at Hoboken, New Jersey.

== Career ==
His first two jobs were with water utilities: Boston Water Works as Director of the Chestnut Hill Laboratory (1889–97) and Brooklyn Department of Water Supply as Director of the Mt. Prospect Laboratory (1897-1904). While at both institutions, he gathered the material to produce his seminal work The Microscopy of Drinking Water. It was the first text solely devoted to identifying and cataloging microscopic aquatic organisms that interfered with sources of drinking water. Many noteworthy items were included in the book, but two deserve special mention. First, to determine the transparency/turbidity in reservoirs, Whipple modified the original all-white Secchi disk to "…a disc about 8 inches in diameter, divided into quadrants painted alternately black and white like the target of a level-rod…" The black and white Secchi disk is the standard disk currently used in limnology investigations and marine water quality studies. Second, Chapter 9 of his book organized for the first time what was known about odors in water supplies and how algae and other microorganisms contributed to problem odors.

=== Hazen and Whipple ===
Whipple joined Allen Hazen in a consulting firm venture in 1904. Their offices were in New York City and they served clients throughout the U.S. Hazen took the lead on most of the consulting work and Whipple "lent nominal consultative association" in the later years. In 1914, the firm's name was changed to Hazen, Whipple and Fuller when Weston E. Fuller became a partner. Another pioneer in sanitary engineering, Malcolm Pirnie, joined the firm in 1911 and five years later was made a partner in the firm. With Hazen's death in 1930, the firm's records and books passed into the hands of Pirnie.

Whipple worked directly with the Portland, Maine Water District in 1908 and 1924. He recommended on both occasions that filtration of Sebago Lake was not required. For other water supplies, he had the opposite recommendation. In 1922, he recommended that most surface water supplies be filtered because those water sources were rarely protected from contamination.

Hazen and Whipple were hired by the City of Pittsburgh in 1910 to investigate the necessity of replacing the city's combined sewer system, which had no sewage treatment plant, with a separate sewer system and a treatment plant. They recommended no change in the existing system. At the time, their report was hailed as "The most important sewerage and sewage disposal report made in the United States." Later in the 20th century, with a greater understanding by the engineering profession of the environmental impacts of combined sewer overflows, and the regulatory requirements for their control, the report would not receive the same plaudits today that it did in 1910.

While a partner at Hazen and Whipple, he was also consulting professor of water supply and sewage disposal at the Brooklyn Polytechnic Institute from 1907 to 1911.

=== Chlorination and the Jersey City trials ===
Whipple's early training in bacteriology prepared him to evaluate the use of chlorine for disinfection of water supplies. In early 1906, Whipple visited Europe and toured several facilities using various forms of chlorine for drinking water disinfection. He presented his findings from the trip at a June 1906 AWWA conference. In his paper, he noted that while it was unlikely that "poisonous chemicals" would be added to drinking water to kill bacteria, that some consideration of chemical disinfection might be given in the future. After his presentation, the audience verbally attacked him for even suggesting that chemicals be used for drinking water disinfection. Neither sanitary engineers nor the public at large were ready for chemical disinfection.

In 1899, Jersey City, New Jersey contracted for the construction of a new water supply on the Rockaway River, which was 23 miles west of the city. The water supply included a dam, reservoir and 23-mile pipeline and was completed on May 23, 1904. As was common during this time period, no treatment (except for detention and sedimentation fostered by Boonton Reservoir) was provided to the water supply. City officials were not pleased with the project as delivered by the private water company and filed a lawsuit in the Chancery Court of New Jersey. Among the many complaints by Jersey City officials was the contention that the water served to the city was not "pure and wholesome" as required by the contract. Whipple testified as an expert witness for the plaintiff in both trials. In the first trial, he testified that the water that was supplied to the city was contaminated with bacteria from sewage discharges in the watershed above the reservoir. Other expert witnesses for the plaintiffs included Earle B. Phelps, Charles-Edward A. Winslow and William T. Sedgwick.

In the second trial, Whipple attacked the proposal by John L. Leal to treat the water from the reservoir with chloride of lime (calcium hypochlorite). Instead, he recommended the construction of sewers in the watershed and a treatment plant that would discharge the treated wastes below the reservoir. The chlorination system was declared a success by the Special Master, William J. Magie, and was judged capable of supplying Jersey City with water that was "pure and wholesome."

Despite his opposition to chlorination of the Jersey City water supply, Whipple recommended the addition of chloride of lime before the slow sand filters at Poughkeepsie, New York. His recommendation was quickly adopted on March 17, 1909, which made the Poughkeepsie water supply the third U.S. drinking water source to receive continuous disinfection by chlorine (after Jersey City [September 26, 1908] and the treatment plant at Little Falls, New Jersey [February 4, 1909]).

=== Harvard School of Public Health ===
Whipple's career took an important turn in 1911 when he was appointed Gordon McKay Professor of Sanitary Engineering at Harvard University where he remained until his death. His appointment was somewhat unusual even during this time period due to the fact that he only possessed a bachelor of science degree. However, his extensive research and publications, his technical leadership and his position at the Brooklyn Polytechnic Institute prepared him for his new responsibilities.

Along with his mentor, William T. Sedgwick, and Milton J. Rosenau, Whipple founded the School of Public Health in 1913 which was jointly supported by Harvard University and MIT. In 1922, the joint school became the Harvard School of Public Health and Whipple taught courses under the curriculum.

=== American Red Cross and mission to Russia ===
Whipple was an active volunteer and advisor to the American Red Cross. In 1917 and with the rank of Major, he was appointed Deputy Commissioner to Russia. Whipple, along with his colleagues C.-E. A. Winslow and Malcolm Pirnie, was part of a large group of people who traveled to Russia to during the time of the Kerensky government.

He also served Chief of the Department of Sanitation in the League of Red Cross Societies in Geneva, Switzerland. In this capacity he studied typhus fever in Romania.

=== Whipple's Index ===
Whipple was also the author of a technique, called Whipple's Index, to measure the degree to which respondents' ages in surveys were affected by rounding or other kinds of culturally affected mis-reporting.

== Personal life ==
During his adult life, Whipple lived primarily in New York City and Cambridge, Massachusetts. On June 29, 1893, he married Mary E. Rayner of Chelsea, Massachusetts. They had one daughter and one son: Marion (Mrs. Gerald M. Keith) and Joseph Rayner Whipple.

Whipple lent his name to the Life Extension Institute as a member of the Hygiene Reference Board—Public Health Administration. The institute, which was formed in 1913, promoted a number of useful public health measures including the development of uncontaminated water supplies. However, it also promoted eugenics which was a bio-social movement that included the sterilization of defective people.

== Professional associations and commissions ==
Whipple was active in a long list of professional associations and he served on numerous national and international commissions. He was elected to the American Public Health Association in 1899. Whipple became involved in the Committee on Standard Methods of Water Analysis, which was chaired by his friend George W. Fuller. In 1922, he was elected as a Charter Fellow of the APHA.

George C. Whipple was also honored as a Fellow of the following institutions: American Academy of Arts and Sciences, American Association for the Advancement of Science, and Royal Sanitary Institute. In 1973, he was inducted into the American Water Works Association Water Industry Hall of Fame.

== Limited list of publications ==
- Whipple, George C. (1899). The Microscopy of Drinking-Water. New York:John Wiley & Sons.
- Whipple, George C. (1902). "On the Practical Value of Presumptive Tests for Bacillus Coli in Water." Public Health Pap Rep. 28: 422–31.
- Whipple, George C. (1906). "Disinfection as a Means of Water Purification." Proceedings AWWA. 266–80.
- Whipple, George C. (1906). "Disinfection as a Means of Water Purification." The Surveyor. 30:768, October 5. 413–6.
- Whipple, George C. (1907). The Value of Pure Water. New York:John Wiley & Sons.
- Whipple, George C. (1908). Typhoid Fever: Its Causation, Transmission and Prevention. New York:Wiley. Typhoid Fever, archive.org
- Whipple, George C. (1917). State Sanitation. Cambridge:Harvard University Press.
- Ward, Henry B. and Whipple, George C. (1918). Fresh-Water Biology. New York:John Wiley & Sons.
- Whipple, George C. (1919). . Vital Statistics: An introduction to the science of democracy. New York:John Wiley & Sons.
- Jordan, E. O., Whipple, G. C., and Winslow, C.-E. A. (1924). A Pioneer of Public Health: William Thompson Sedgwick. New Haven, Conn.: Yale University Press.
