= John L. Leal =

American public health physician (1858–1914)

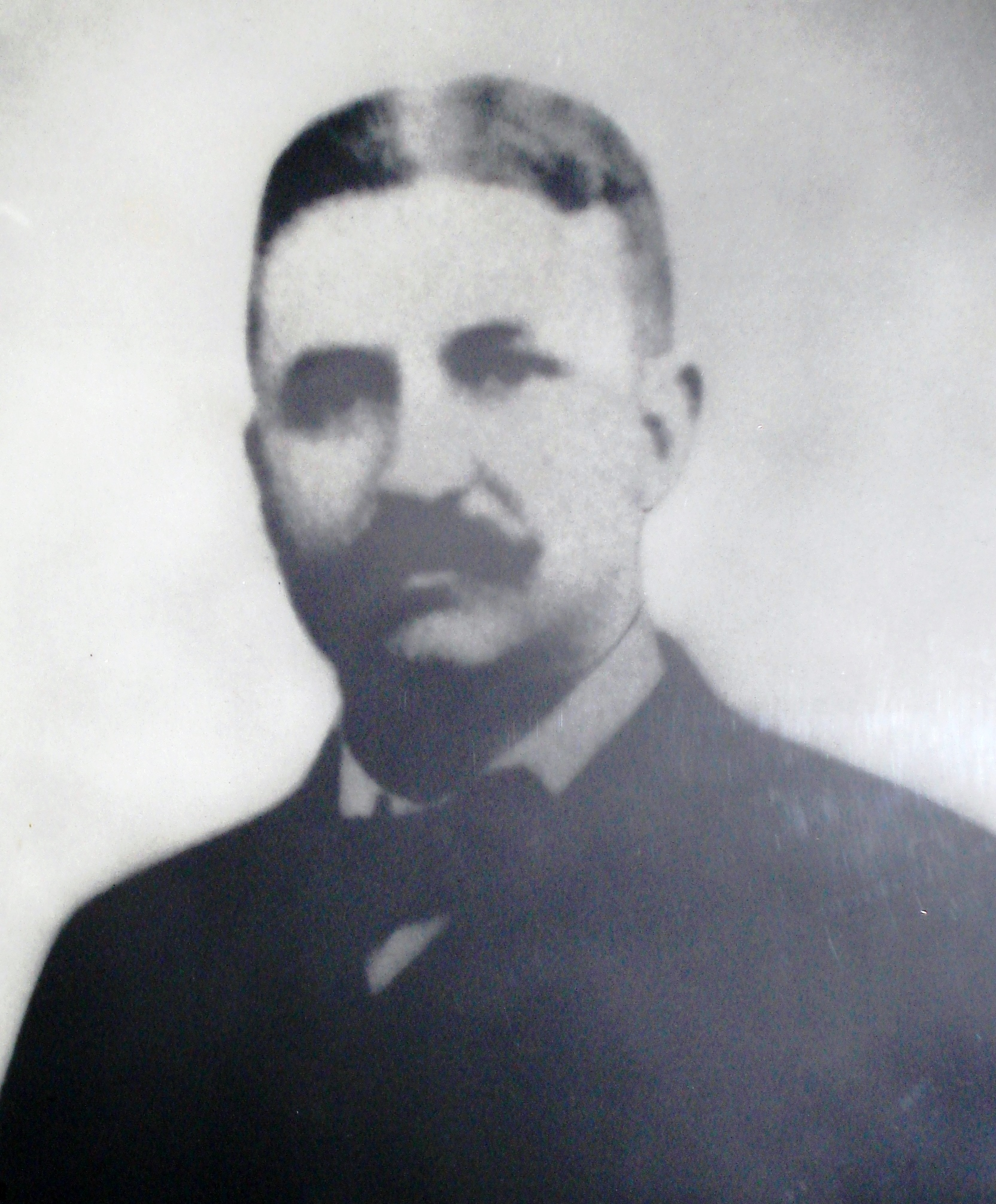
- Born: May 5, 1858; Andes, New York
- Died: March 13, 1914 (aged 55); Paterson, New Jersey
- Resting place: Cedar Lawn Cemetery, Paterson, New Jersey
- Education: Princeton College, (BA 1880); Princeton College (MA, 1883); Columbia College of Physicians and Surgeons (MD, 1884)
- Occupations: Physician and sanitary adviser to drinking water companies
- Known for: First use of chlorine for disinfection of a U.S. drinking water supply
- Awards: Water Industry Hall of Fame, American Water Works Association, 1974.

John Laing Leal (May 5, 1858 – March 13, 1914) was an American physician and water treatment expert who, in 1908, was responsible for conceiving and implementing the first disinfection of a U.S. drinking water supply using chlorine. He was one of the principal expert witnesses at two trials which examined the quality of the water supply in Jersey City, New Jersey, and which evaluated the safety and utility of chlorine for production of "pure and wholesome" drinking water. The second trial verdict approved the use of chlorine to disinfect drinking water which led to an explosion of its use in water supplies across the U.S.

== Early life and education ==
John L. Leal was born in Andes, New York, in 1858. In 1862, his father, John R. Leal who was a physician, joined the 144th New York Volunteer Infantry Regiment. John R. Leal saw service in a number of areas during the Civil War including Folly Island during the Siege of Charleston, South Carolina. He contracted a chronic case of amoebic dysentery (most likely from contaminated drinking water) at Folly Island from which he suffered for the next 19 years before the disease caused his death in 1882.

In 1867, Dr. John R. Leal moved his family from Andes to the rapidly growing industrial city of Paterson, New Jersey. John L. Leal received his primary education at the Paterson Seminary. He attended Princeton College (now Princeton University) from 1876 to 1880. John L. Leal attended medical school at the Columbia College of Physicians and Surgeons from 1880 to 1884 where he received his medical degree.

== Career ==
After obtaining his medical degree, Leal opened a medical practice in Paterson, New Jersey, and was appointed City Physician in 1886. Along with other physicians, he founded the outpatient clinic at Paterson General Hospital in 1887 and worked there until 1892. In 1888, he married Amy Arrowsmith and their only son, Graham, was born within the year. Leal's career in Paterson city government continued with his appointment as Health Inspector in 1891 and Health Officer in 1892. As Health Officer, Leal was responsible for the identification of epidemics of communicable diseases and for the disinfection of the homes of the afflicted. He also oversaw the public water supply and was responsible for constructing the growing network of sewers to remove domestic and industrial wastes from the City. To prevent the spread of contagious diseases, he was responsible for building an Isolation Hospital in Paterson in 1897, which, at the time, was considered a model facility. He published several papers during his tenure as Health Officer including one that described the cause of a waterborne typhoid fever outbreak in Paterson.

In 1899, Leal left the city's service and became the sanitary adviser to the East Jersey Water Company. His decision to focus on matters of public health and the safety of drinking water was driven in part by his personal experiences and from the influence of Garret Hobart, who became the 24th Vice President of the United States in 1896. Toward the end of his life, Leal was President of the Board of Health for the City of Paterson.

== Professional associations ==
Leal belonged to a large number of professional associations. In 1884, he was elected a member of the Medical Society of New Jersey, and he was an active member of the Passaic County Medical Society. In 1900, he was Vice President of that organization. Despite his concentration on water treatment affairs after 1899, he was still involved in the Passaic County Medical Society, serving on the Legislative Committee in 1900 and in 1901 he was President. In 1905, he was active in the State Medical Society and he served as a permanent delegate from Passaic County.

In 1903, Leal was president of the New Jersey Sanitary Association. On the program for the Sanitary Association meeting on December 4–5, 1903, Leal was noted for giving the President's Address on "Present Attitude of Sanitary Science". Moses N. Baker was chair of the Garbage Disposal committee of the association and at a topic session entitled Sewage Disposal in New Jersey, the speakers included Rudolph Hering, Allen Hazen, George W. Fuller and the New Jersey water supply expert Charles A. Vermeule. These professionals interacted with one another throughout their careers.

He was a member of the American Medical Association and the American Public Health Association. At the APHA annual meeting in 1897, Leal read a paper entitled, "House Sanitation with Reference to Drainage, Plumbing, and Ventilation". At the 1902 annual meeting of the APHA in New Orleans, Leal was elected second vice-president of the organization.

== Jersey City water supply ==
In 1899, Jersey City entered into a contract with Patrick H. Flynn to build a water supply to replace the one that was significantly contaminated by sewage. A large dam was built on the Rockaway River which resulted in the formation of Boonton Reservoir that had a capacity of over 7 billion gallons of water. During construction, the project was taken over by the Jersey City Water Supply Company (JCWSC), which was a private water company that employed John L. Leal as its sanitary adviser. Included in Leal's responsibilities was the removal of illegally constructed privies and other obvious sources of sewage contamination from the watershed above Boonton Reservoir. The dam, reservoir and 23-mile pipeline was completed and on May 4, 1904, water from the project was first delivered to Jersey City. As was common at this time, no treatment of any kind was provided to the water supply. City officials were not pleased with the project as delivered by the JCWSC and filed a lawsuit in the Chancery Court of New Jersey. Among the many complaints by Jersey City officials was the contention that the water served to the city was not "pure and wholesome" as required by the contract.

== Lawsuit and trials ==
The first trial was held before Frederick W. Stevens, Vice Chancellor of the Chancery Court of New Jersey. The first day of trial was February 20, 1906, and the trial was not completed until dozens of witnesses had been heard over 40 days of trial comprising hundreds of exhibits and thousands of pages of testimony. On May 1, 1908, Vice Chancellor Stevens issued a 100-page opinion that supported many of the contract claims made by the JCWSC but, most importantly, found (for the plaintiffs) that two to three times per year, water that could not be considered "pure and wholesome" was delivered to Jersey City from the Boonton Reservoir water supply. In his final decree dated June 4, 1908, Stevens ordered the JCWSC to pay for the construction of sewers to remove contaminants from the Rockaway River watershed or create "other plans or devices" which could be used instead to produce water of the required purity. The JCWSC was given three months to come up with "other plans or devices" and to present them to a special master, Justice William J. Magie.

As a physician who was trained in bacteriology, Leal knew that chlorine killed bacteria. As Health Officer for Paterson, Leal used solutions of chloride of lime (calcium hypochlorite) to "disinfect" homes where scarlet fever, diphtheria and other communicable diseases were found. He was also aware of previous efforts to use chlorine in drinking water supplies. In 1897, high concentrations of chlorine derived from chloride of lime were used to disinfect the reservoir and pipelines of Maidstone, England, after an outbreak of typhoid fever. In 1905, Dr. Alexander Cruickshank Houston devised a crude sodium hypochlorite feed system to kill typhoid bacteria in the water supply of Lincoln, England, that was being treated with an inadequate filtration system. During Leal's testimony in the second trial, he made extensive references to the Lincoln example. He also stated in the trial that he had conducted laboratory disinfection experiments using chlorine as early as 1898.

On June 19, 1908, Leal hired George W. Fuller to construct a chlorination plant at Boonton Reservoir to disinfect the water for Jersey City as a representation of "other plans or devices". At the time, Fuller was, perhaps, the most respected sanitary engineer in the U.S. In 99 days, Fuller designed the chlorination plant and supervised its construction. Dilute solutions of chloride of lime were accurately fed by gravity to the water being treated. Fuller based his design on the successful aluminum sulfate feed system that he had built at the Little Falls Water Treatment Plant in 1902. The chlorination plant at Boonton Reservoir treating an average of 40 million gallons per day went on-line on September 26, 1908. Since then, water from this source has been continuously chlorinated, making it the water supply with the longest history of disinfection.

The second trial began on September 29, 1908, before Justice William J. Magie. The purpose of this trial was to determine if the chloride of lime system that had been installed by JCWSC was effective in controlling harmful bacterial levels and capable of providing water that was "pure and wholesome". Over 38 days, dozens of witnesses were heard and hundreds of exhibits were submitted. More than three thousand pages recorded the testimony of expert witnesses for both sides including William T. Sedgwick, George C. Whipple, Earle B. Phelps, Charles-Edward A. Winslow and a number of other experts for the plaintiffs and John L. Leal, George W. Fuller and Rudolph Hering (among others) for the defendants. Justice Magie issued his ruling on May 9, 1910, which was a victory for the defendants. Chlorine was an acceptable treatment for the removal of pathogens from drinking water and for making the water "pure and wholesome" for human consumption.

"I do therefore find and report that this device is capable of rendering the water delivered to Jersey City, pure and wholesome, for the purposes for which it is intended, and is effective in removing from the water those dangerous germs which were deemed by the decree to possibly exist therein at certain times."

The ruling by Justice Magie was supported on appeal by the New Jersey Court of Errors and Appeals and the New Jersey Supreme Court.

== Legacy ==
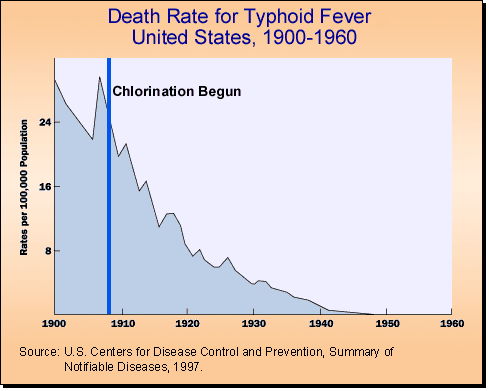
Death rates for typhoid fever in the U.S. 1906–1960

Leal's application of chlorine disinfection technology and his defense of the chemical's use, contributed significantly to the eradication of typhoid fever and other waterborne diseases in the U.S.. On September 26, 1908, only the Jersey City water supply was disinfected using chlorine. A survey of water utilities showed that by 1914, over 21 million people were being served chlorinated water in the U.S. By 1918, more than 1,000 North American cities were using chlorine to disinfect their water supplies, which served approximately 33 million people.

Statistics on the typhoid fever death rate in the U.S. showed a dramatic decrease in deaths due to this dreaded disease after the wide introduction of chlorine for disinfection. Filtration of water supplies contributed to the decrease in the typhoid fever death rate but chlorination is generally acknowledged as having a major impact on increased life expectancy in the U.S.

Leal is seldom given credit for his pioneering work in the disinfection of drinking water. George A. Johnson was a plant operator and laboratory technician who worked on the chlorination plant at Boonton Reservoir. His later writings gave no credit to Leal and, by inference, Johnson took the credit for the decision to use chlorine on the Jersey City water supply. The record shows that Leal came up with the idea to disinfect the water supply of Jersey City and he should be given the credit for this major advance in public health.

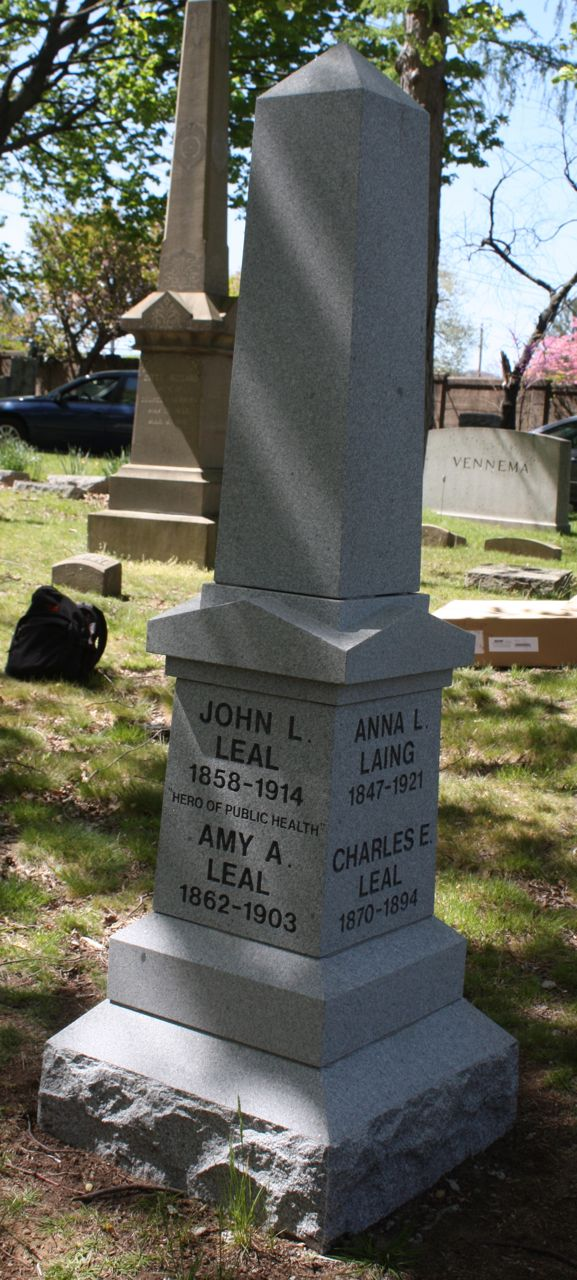
Grave Monument to Dr. John L. Leal

On May 5, 2013, a number of people gathered at the gravesite of Leal in Paterson, New Jersey and dedicated a monument to him as a "Hero of Public Health." Present at the dedication were members of the New Jersey Section of the American Water Works Association and two great grandsons of Leal.

In August 2013, the American Water Works Association established a major annual award in honor of Leal. Entitled the Dr. John L. Leal Award, the purpose of the award is to recognize any individual, group, or organization that has made a notable and outstanding public health contribution to the water profession. The first award was given at the AWWA annual conference in June 2014 to Michael J. McGuire.
