= Allen Hazen =

American civil engineer (1869–1930)

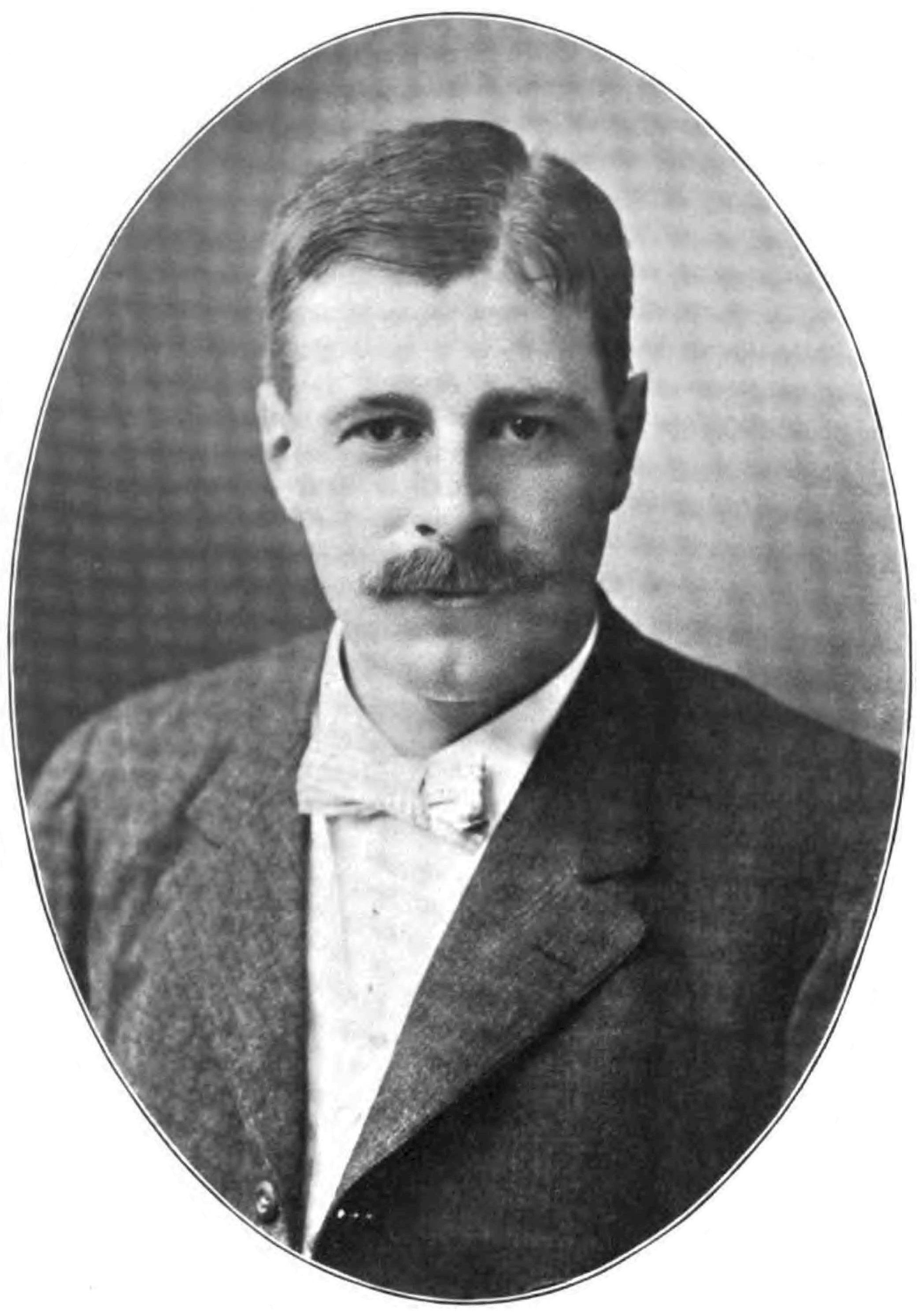
- Allen Hazen, President of the New England Water Works Association, 1911
- Born: August 28, 1869; Norwich, Vermont, USA
- Died: July 26, 1930 (aged 60); Miles City, Montana, USA
- Resting place: Hartford, Vermont, USA
- Education: BS, New Hampshire College of Agriculture and Mechanical Arts, 1884
- Occupation: Consulting engineer
- Known for: Outstanding engineering achievements in several fields
- Spouse: Elizabeth McConway (m. 1903)
- Children: 6
- Awards: Thomas Fitch Rowland Prize, American Society of Civil Engineers, 1900; Norman Medal, American Society of Civil Engineers, 1915; Water Industry Hall of Fame, American Water Works Association, 1971.

Allen Hazen (August 28, 1869 – July 26, 1930) was an American civil engineer and an expert in hydraulics, flood control, water purification and sewage treatment. His career extended from 1888 to 1930, and he is well known for his contributions to hydraulics with the Hazen-Williams equation. Hazen published some of the seminal works on sedimentation and filtration. He was President of the New England Water Works Association and Vice President of the American Society of Civil Engineers.

== Early life and education ==
Hazen was born in 1869 on his family farm located near the Connecticut River close to the small town of Norwich, Vermont. He attended the New Hampshire College of Agriculture and Mechanical Arts (which was affiliated with Dartmouth College) and graduated with a Bachelor of Science degree at 15 years of age.

During a year spent at MIT (1887–88), Hazen studied chemistry and came into contact with Professor William T. Sedgwick, Dr. Thomas M. Drown and fellow students George W. Fuller and George C. Whipple.

== Career ==
As a direct result of his association with Dr. Thomas M. Drown, Hazen was offered his first job at the Lawrence Experiment Station in Lawrence, Massachusetts. According to the Government of Massachusetts, LES was one of the first laboratories in the world focused on environmental research and its studies "laid the foundation for modern methods of wastewater treatment and drinking water purification." From 1888 to 1893, Hazen headed the research team at this innovative research institute into water purification and sewage treatment.

=== Hydraulics and dams ===
In 1902, Hazen and Gardner S. Williams co-developed and introduced the Hazen-Williams equation, a widely used equation for calculating headloss along a pipe based on the pipe's physical properties and flow conditions. In 1905, the two engineers published an influential book, which contained solutions to the Hazen-Williams equation for pipes of widely varying diameters. The equation uses an empirically derived constant for the “roughness” of the pipe walls which became known as the Hazen-Williams coefficient.

In 1908, Hazen was appointed by President Theodore Roosevelt to a panel of expert engineers to inspect the construction progress on the Panama Canal with President-elect William H. Taft. Hazen specifically reported on the soundness of the Gatun Dam (an integral structure in the canal system), which he said was constructed of the proper materials and not in any danger of failure.

Late in his career, Hazen concentrated on ways to statistically describe the recurrence interval of flood flows in rivers. His book on the subject was published the year he died.

The Allen Hazen Water Tower was built in 1930–31 in Des Moines, Iowa. Hazen designed the tower shortly before he died. In his honor, the City of Des Moines named the tower after him.

=== Water purification ===
Hazen’s early work at the Lawrence Experiment Station established some of the basic parameters for the design of slow sand filters. One of his greatest contributions to filtration technology was the derivation of two terms for describing the size distribution of filter media: effective size and uniformity coefficient. These two parameters are used today to specify the size of filter materials for water purification applications. His first book, The Filtration of Public Water Supplies, was published in 1895.

His first assignment as a sole practitioner in 1897 was the design of the filtration plant at Albany, New York. The plant was the first continuously operated slow sand filter plant in the U.S.

One of his early assignments was as consultant to Pittsburgh, Pennsylvania, to determine the best method of providing a safe water supply from the Monongahela River. For decades, the city had been wracked with typhoid fever epidemics. At the time, mechanical filtration (or rapid sand filtration) was just beginning to be understood as a treatment process. As a conservative engineer, Hazen recommended that the City install slow sand filters to remove both turbidity and harmful bacteria from its water supply. As early as 1904, Hazen recommended the filtration of the Croton water supply for New York City. As of 2012, a new filtration plant on that water supply is nearing completion.

=== Sewage collection and disposal ===
At the age of 24, Hazen was charged with the responsibility for sewage collection and disposal for the 1893 Chicago World’s Fair and Columbian Exposition.

For many years, the Passaic River below Paterson, New Jersey was highly contaminated with sewage and industrial wastes, which was a nuisance to the cities below and which made it impossible to use the river water for any purpose. Hazen was hired by a joint committee established to find a solution to the regional water contamination problem. His recommendations (which were eventually implemented) included a trunk sewer to capture wastes prior to their discharge into the River and to deliver the wastes to a sewage treatment plant near the mouth of the River.

=== Consulting firms ===
For most of his career, Hazen was a consulting engineer to many municipalities and other clients.

- Noyes and Hazen, Boston, Massachusetts, 1895–1897
- Single practice, New York City, 1897–1904
- Hazen and Whipple, New York City, 1904–1924
- Hazen and others (Weston E. Fuller, Malcolm Pirnie, Chester M. Everett and L.N. Babbitt), New York City, 1924–1930

In 1897, Allen Hazen opened up a single person practice in New York City and for a couple of years, shared the same address as one of his professional colleagues, George W. Fuller at 220 Broadway.

Hazen’s clients included Albany, New York; New York City; Washington, DC; San Francisco, California; Lawrence and Springfield, Massachusetts; Providence, Rhode Island; Pittsburgh and Philadelphia, Pennsylvania; St. Louis, Missouri, Brisbane, Australia; and Ottawa and Toronto, Canada.

== Personal life ==
For many years, Allen Hazen lived in New York City. For most of the last decades of his life, Hazen and his family lived in Dobbs Ferry, New York. In 1903, he married Elizabeth McConway in Pittsburgh. They had four daughters and two sons. Their son Richard Hazen (1911-1990) was also a professional engineer in the field of water supply and wastewater engineering, and founded the consulting firm Hazen and Sawyer in 1951.

== Professional associations ==
He was active in numerous professional associations. He was President of the New England Water Works Association and Vice President of the American Society of Civil Engineers. In the fall of 1929, Hazen and his wife attended the World Engineering Congress in Tokyo, Japan as a representative of the American Society of Civil Engineers.

== Honors ==
Hazen received honorary degrees of Doctor of Science from both New Hampshire College of Agriculture and Mechanical Arts (1913) and Dartmouth College (1917). In 1915, he received the Norman Medal which is the highest honor given by the American Society of Civil Engineers for a technical paper that "makes a definitive contribution to engineering science." He was selected as an Honorary Member of the American Water Works Association in 1930. In 1971, he was inducted into the AWWA Water Industry Hall of Fame with his friend and colleague, George W. Fuller.

== Limited list of publications ==
- Sedgwick, William T. and Hazen, Allen. (1892). “Typhoid Fever in Chicago.” Engr. News and American Railway Jour. April 21.
- Hazen, Allen. (1895). The Filtration of Public Water-Supplies. New York:Wiley.
- Hazen, Allen, (1896). “The Measurement of the Colors of Natural Waters,” American Chemist Jour. 18: 364.
- Hazen, Allen. (1899). “Report of the Consulting Engineer.” In Report of the Filtration Commission of the City of Pittsburgh, Pennsylvania. Pittsburgh:n.p., 27-86.
- Hazen, Allen. (1905). “Purification of Water for Domestic Use.” Trans. ASCE. 54:Part D, 131-54.
- Williams, Gardner S. and Hazen, Allen. (1905). Hydraulic Tables. New York:Wiley.
- Hazen, Allen. (1906). “Report of Allen Hazen.” In Report on the Joint Committee on Sewage Disposal of the City of Paterson. Paterson:n.p.
- Hazen, Allen. (1916). Clean Water and How to Get It. New York:Wiley.
- Hazen, Allen. (1930). Flood Flows: A Study of Frequencies and Magnitudes. New York:Wiley.
