= Earle B. Phelps =

Chemist, bacteriologist, and sanitary expert

- Born: July 10, 1876; Galesburg, Illinois
- Died: May 29, 1953 (aged 76); Gainesville, Florida
- Education: BS, Massachusetts Institute of Technology, 1899
- Occupations: University professor and sanitary expert
- Known for: Sewage disinfection and surface water quality mathematical equation
- Awards: Lasker Award for Public Service, 1953.

Earle Bernard Phelps (July 10, 1876 – May 29, 1953) was a chemist, bacteriologist and sanitary expert who served in governmental positions and as an academic in some of the leading universities in the U.S. He is known for his contributions in sewage disinfection, water chlorination, sewage treatment, milk pasteurization, shellfish control, and for describing the “oxygen sag curve” in surface water bodies.

== Early life and education ==
Phelps was born on July 10, 1876, in Galesburg, Illinois, the county seat of Knox County, not far from the Iowa border and 156 miles (251 kilometers) southwest of Chicago. His parents were Lucius Joshua Phelps and Ida May Taylor. Lucius (1850–1925) was the inventor who specialized in telegraphy. His paternal ancestry can be traced for six generations to William Phelps, Sr. (1599–1672), the English immigrant who came to America in 1630 and settled in Windsor, Connecticut. Earle received his early education in New Jersey schools. He graduated from the Massachusetts Institute of Technology in 1899 with a Bachelor of Science degree in chemistry. While a student at MIT, Phelps was influenced by his teacher and mentor, William T. Sedgwick.

== Career ==
After graduating from MIT and until 1903, Phelps worked as an assistant bacteriologist at the famous Lawrence Experiment Station in Lawrence, Massachusetts. From 1903 until 1911, he was a chemist/microbiologist with the Sanitary Research Laboratory at MIT. He also taught at MIT during this period as an assistant professor of chemistry and biology. Early in his career, he investigated a typhoid fever epidemic at the State Hospital in Trenton, New Jersey. During this same period, he worked for the U.S. Geological Survey as an assistant hydrographer. In part, he worked on the purification of industrial wastes and he began his investigations on stream pollution with that agency. In 1910 to 1911 he conducted groundbreaking research with Colonel William M. Black of the U.S. Army Corps of Engineers on the pollution of New York Harbor. This work established for the first time the concept of using dissolved oxygen concentrations in the water as a measure of water quality in the harbor.

In 1913, he left MIT and became the head of the Chemistry Division at the U.S. Hygienic Laboratory in Washington, DC., which was part of the U.S. Public Health Service. Phelps worked with H. W. Streeter who was a sanitary engineer with the Public Health service on the characterization of oxygen depletion in a stream receiving organic wastes. The Streeter-Phelps equation was the first quantitative model that was used to determine the impact of biochemical oxygen demand discharges to surface water bodies. Their equation led to deterministic modeling which made it possible to limit specific discharges from waste treatment plants.

In 1919, Phelps left the Hygienic Laboratory to accept an academic position at Stanford University. Later, he also taught at Columbia University from 1925 until 1943. From 1944 until his death in 1953 he was a professor of sanitary science at the University of Florida at Gainesville. He has been described as a gifted teacher who generously shared his knowledge with his associates and students.

Phelps had a long and distinguished career as a consulting sanitary expert. He worked for many cities helping them resolve problems with water treatment and sewage disposal. From 1907 to 1909, he was a consulting expert for the New Jersey Sewerage Commission. He visited all of the sewage disposal plants in the state and made annual reports on the results of his inspections. He also was retained by the Sewerage Commission of Baltimore, Maryland as a consulting expert in relation to experiments with sewage disposal. Phelps supervised the design and construction of a large number of sewage purification plants including those at Toronto, Ontario, Canada, Tarrytown, New York, Rahway, New Jersey and Torrington, Connecticut.

== Chlorination and the Jersey City water quality trials ==
In 1899, Jersey City, New Jersey contracted with a private water company for the construction of a new water supply on the Rockaway River. The water supply included a dam, reservoir and 23-mile pipeline and was completed on May 4, 1904. The only treatment provided to the water supply was the residence time in Boonton Reservoir and the resulting sedimentation processes, which resulted in a significant decrease in the bacterial concentrations in the reservoir influent. City officials were not pleased with the project as delivered by the private water company and filed a lawsuit in the Chancery Court of New Jersey. Among the many complaints stated by Jersey City officials was the contention that the water served to the city was not "pure and wholesome" as required by the contract. After the first trial, Vice Chancellor Frederic W. Stevens ruled that two to three times per year the reservoir did an imperfect job removing bacteria from the water. He ordered the private water company to build sewers in the watershed or provide for "other plans or devices" to purify the water. A second trial was held to determine, in part, whether the addition of chloride of lime (calcium hypochlorite) produced a water that was "pure and wholesome". Phelps was an expert witness for the plaintiffs in the second trial.

Phelps testified that the addition of chloride of lime did not make the water from Boonton Reservoir pure and wholesome. He believed that sewers should be constructed in the watershed to transport the wastes below the dam where a sewage disposal plant would treat the wastes and discharge the effluent into the Rockaway River. Phelps was supported in his testimony by other expert witnesses for the plaintiffs including William T. Sedgwick, George C. Whipple and Charles-Edward A. Winslow. However, the plaintiffs’ arguments were not convincing to the Court. The chlorination system was declared safe, reliable and effective by the Special Master, William J. Magie, and was judged capable of supplying Jersey City with water that was "pure and wholesome."

Despite his opposition to chlorination of the Jersey City water supply, Phelps was a strong proponent of the chlorination of sewage and sewage disposal plant effluents before discharge into a lake or river. Prior to 1909, Phelps conducted numerous experiments on chlorination of sewage and sewage disposal plant effluents. He worked on this research area at the MIT Sanitary Research Laboratory with Charles-Edward A. Winslow and he also conducted investigations while working for the New Jersey Sewerage Commission and the Baltimore Sewerage Commission. He found that chloride of lime was "…the most efficient germicide that we have now available".

During the second trial, one of the issues of contention was the mode of action of chloride of lime once it was dissolved in water. John L. Leal claimed that bacteria were killed by nascent oxygen that was released when chlorine was added to water. Phelps noted that he had recently been experimenting with a coal tar derivative called orthotolidine which he said could be used to show that chlorine itself was present in water and he claimed that chlorine was responsible for the disinfection of pathogens. The orthotolidine method for chorine residual was modified many times over the next several decades but Phelps's testimony about it was the first mention of it in any document. The method was used for many years as the standard way of determining chlorine residuals in water. In the 1970s and 1980s it was eventually replaced by the DPD method. Orthotolidine is still used in test kits to determine chlorine levels in swimming pools.

== Personal life ==
On October 29, 1902, he married Helen May Ellis of Lawrence, Massachusetts. They had five children and at his death, he had ten grandchildren.

== Professional associations ==
Phelps was active in a long list of professional associations including the American Society of Civil Engineers, American Chemical Society, American Public Health Association, Society of American Bacteriologists, American Association for the Advancement of Science, the New England Water Works Association, Massachusetts Association of Boards of Health and the Boston Society of Civil Engineers.

== Honors and awards ==
In 1953, Phelps was awarded the prestigious Albert Lasker Public Service Award from the American Public Health Association “in recognition of a lifetime of pioneering leadership in public health and sanitary science.” In 1964, the Florida Section of the Water Environment Federation established the Earle B. Phelps Award, which is given annually to a wastewater treatment plant for outstanding operation. The University of Florida named one of its laboratory buildings in Phelps's honor.

== Limited list of publications ==
- Phelps, Earle B. (1909). "The Disinfection of Sewage and Sewage Filter Effluents." Water-Supply Paper 229. Washington, DC:U.S. Geological Survey.
- Phelps, Earle B. (1910). “The Disinfection of Water and Sewage.” In Contributions from the Sanitary Research Laboratory and Sewage Experiment Station. Boston:MIT, 1–17.
- Phelps, Earle B. (1910). “Disinfection of Sewage and Sewage Effluents.” Transactions American Society for Municipal Improvements. reprinted in Contributions from the Sanitary Research Laboratory and Sewage Experiment Station. Boston:MIT, 1910, 1–8.
- Streeter, H.W. and Earle B. Phelps. (1925). "A Study of the Pollution and Natural Purification of the Ohio River." Public Health Bulletin No. 146. Washington, DC:United States Public Health Service (February 1925).
- Phelps, Earle B. (1950). Public Health Engineering: A Textbook of the Principles of Environmental Sanitation. Volumes 1 and 2. New York:Wiley.
- Phelps, Earle B. (1953). “They were Giants in Those Days.” American Journal of Public Health. 43 (June): 15–19.
