= Pirnie =

Pirnie is a surname. Notable people with the surname include:

- Alexander Pirnie (1903–1982), American politician
- Amy Pirnie (born 1993), Scottish Nak Muay and kickboxer
- Bruce Pirnie (born 1942) is a Canadian javelin thrower
- Malcolm Pirnie (1889–1967), American civil and consulting engineer
