= George Whipple (disambiguation) =

George Whipple (1878–1976) was an American physician and Nobel prize recipient.

George Whipple may also refer to:

- George C. Whipple (1866–1924), American engineer
- George Whipple III (born 1954), American lawyer and photographer
- Mr. Whipple, advertising character for Charmin toilet paper
