= Bronx Grit Chamber =

Sewage treatment plant in the Bronx, New York

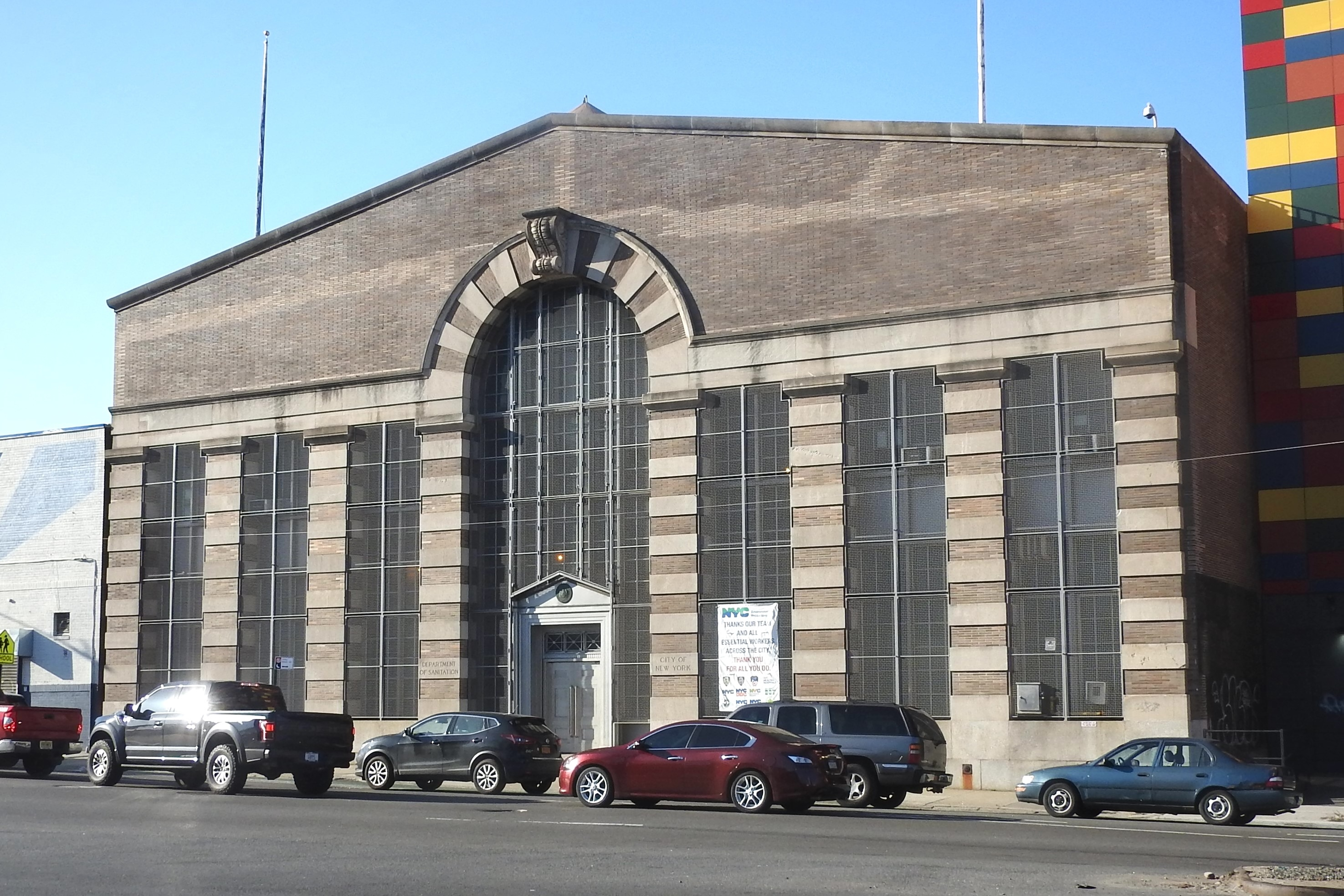

General information
- Type: Sewage plant
- Architectural style: Neo-classical
- Location: 158 Brucker Boulevard, Bronx, New York
- Coordinates: 40.80296°N 73.91899°W
- Year built: 1936–1937
- Owner: New York City Department of Sanitation

Design and construction
- Architecture firm: McKim, Mead, and White

New York City Landmark
- Designated: June 8, 1982
- Reference no.: 1128

The Bronx Grit Chamber is a sewage treatment plant located in the Port Morris section of the Bronx, New York City, US. The building was designed in 1933 by architecture firm McKim, Mead, and White in the neo-classical style and constructed in 1936–1937 as part of the Ward's Island Sewage Treatment Works. A similar plant was built contemporaneously on East 110th Street in Manhattan in the Art Deco style; it is not included in the landmark designation.

The building's function is the initial processing of incoming sewage, filtering out debris larger than about a cigarette butt, known as "grit" in engineering parlance. Machinery in the building processes 95 million US gal (360 million L) of sewage per day, resulting in 98 cubic feet (2.8 m^{3}) of solid screenings. At the time it was constructed, the plant was one of the most modern sewage treatment facilities in the world, replacing a system which dumped untreated sewage directly into the East River.

== History ==
Prior to the building of the Ward's Island plant, New York City's sewage and industrial waste was discharged untreated into the city's rivers. The city's growing population in the latter part of the 19th century led to this pollution being a significant public health issue, as well as affecting the seafood industry. Brooklyn (a separate city until 1898) had begun planning sewage treatment facilities during the 1890s.

The New York Bay Pollution Commission was formed in 1903, followed by the Metropolitan Sewerage Commission in 1906. The latter issued a report in 1914 recommending Ward's Island as the location for a new sewage treatment facility. In 1927, The New York State legislature allocated 52 acres (21 ha) on Ward's Island to be used for this purpose with engineering firm Fuller and McClintock beginning design work in 1928. Principal George W. Fuller had a world-wide reputation for his work on municipal water supply and sewage systems and was a consulting engineer for the U.S. Public Health Service; he died in 1934, before construction began.

Construction of the Ward's Island infrastructure began in June 1931 and was finished by early 1933. Also in 1933, the design work was completed for the Manhattan and Bronx grit chambers and their associated intercepting sewers and connecting tunnels. Work was interrupted, however, by the city's financial problems during the Great Depression of the early 1930s. A grant from the US federal government's Public Works Administration, covering 45% of the project cost, allowed progress to continue in 1935.

In his foreward to the 1937 official dedication of the Ward's Island plant, Mayor Fiorello La Guardia wrote about the previously existing facilities on Ward's Island, consisting of tanks and associated machinery. These had been abandoned in the early 1930s with no connections to Manhattan and the Bronx, and funding for only one sixth the cost to complete the project having been secured. La Guardia stated that he secured the rest of the funding in 1935 and immediately began construction.

== Architecture ==
The building's exterior was designed by the architecture firm of McKim, Mead, and White. By the 1930s, the three founding partners were no longer alive but the firm that bore their name continued its emphasis on the neo-classical style it was originally known for. The only part of the larger Ward's Island project designed by the firm, it bears a resemblance to the Royal Saltworks at Arc-et-Senans designed by 18th-century French architect Claude-Nicholas Ledoux.

The front of the building faces Brucker Boulevard and consists of a large central arch with four massive pilasters (vertical columns) on either side. The pilasters have a rusticated surface constructed from Roman brick and limestone, alternating to produce a bichromatic effect. Atop the pilasters there is a stone entablature (horizontal superstructure) which abuts the central arch on each side; the top of the arch continues the same brick and limestone motif from the two central pilasters which support it. The main entrance to the building is a pair of aluminum doors at the bottom of the central archway.

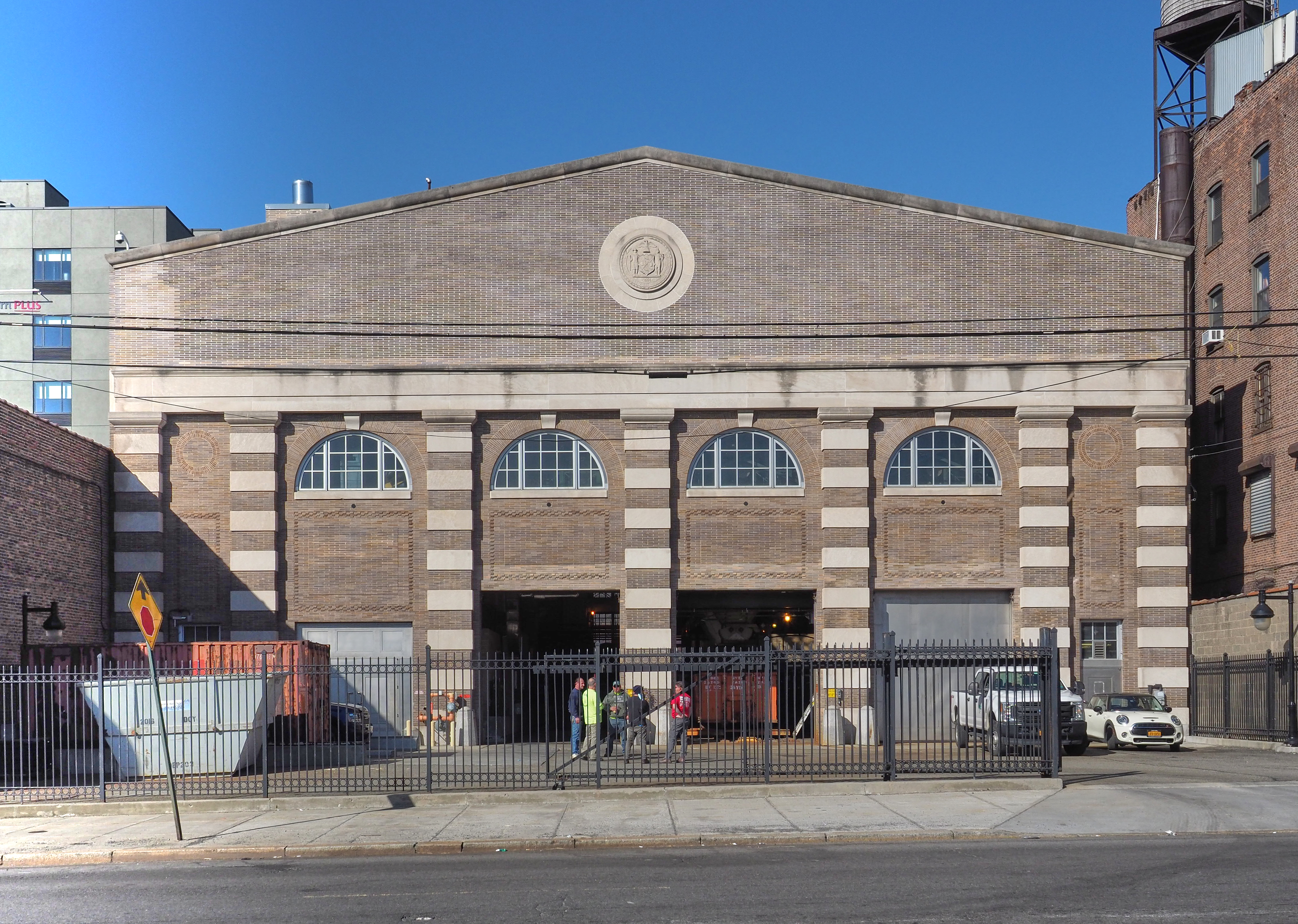
Rear façade

The rear of the building has seven pilasters in a style similar to those on the front. The five central pilasters form four symmetric bays, with two narrower bays at the ends. The four central bays provide truck loading access. The façade was altered in 1972 to include roll-down doors and louvered ventilation panels which were not part of the original design. Above the doors is a seal of the City of New York in carved limestone.

== Landmark status ==
The Bronx Grit Chamber is a New York City Landmark. The designation was proposed at a public hearing of the New York City Landmarks Preservation Commission (LPC) on March 11, 1980, and officially approved on June 8, 1982. The designation report notes that the building is "one of the city's most unusual industrial structures".

LPC chairman Kent Barwick told The New York Times that the building's monumental design reflected "a desire to bring elegance and dignity to even mundane functions". A few days later, a Times editorial observed that the design was a function of the era and that if it had been built contemporaneously, "it probably would have looked like a building in which sewage is screened". The Washington Post reported that the designation announcement was met with "guffaws and cynical remarks" by New York City officials.

== Engineering ==
(1) Bronx Grit Chamber, (2) Manhattan Grit Chamber, (3) Ward's Island Plant

The Ward's Island plant was the first major water pollution control project in New York City. The basic design, using an activated sludge process, was patterned after the Metropolitan Sewage Treatment Plant which had begun construction in 1919 in Milwaukee, Wisconsin. The process consisted of forcing fine bubbles of air through the sludge in processing tanks. In 1938, the Bronx Grit Chamber was staffed by three stationary engineers and nine laborers.

At the time of its construction, Ward's Island was one of the world's most modern sewage plants. In 1946, it was reported to be one of the three largest in the world, with the main part of the plant occupying 77 acres (31 ha) on nearby Ward's Island. At the time the Bronx Grit Chamber was completed, the Bronx part of the system included a 2.5-mile (4.0 km) intercepting sewer, with plans for an additional 3-mile (4.8 km) section running north to the border with Westchester County. A 1-mile (1.6 km) tunnel connected the grit chamber to the main plant on Ward's Island, running 150 feet (46 m) deep. The initial capacity of the plant was 200 million US gal (760 million L) per day, which was one-fifth of the total flow for the city.

The Bronx Grit Chamber serves the western part of the Bronx, roughly from Crotona Avenue and Jerome Avenue, west to the Harlem and Hudson rivers. This area was connected in stages; the initial area included 4,314 acres (1,746 ha) serving 553,000 people. Expansion to add an additional 3,025 acres (1,224 ha) and 157,000 people was planned to be completed by 1938. These were fed by 2.5 miles (4.0 km) of existing interceptors and eight sewers ranging in diameter from 9.5-foot (2.9 m) to 12-foot (3.7 m) which previously dumped their flow into the Harlem River. The part of the Bronx east of this area (which was developed later) is served by a newer plant in Hunts Point.

=== Grit ===
The purpose of the plant is to remove what the engineers call "grit": solid objects which would clog the pipes leading to the Ward's Island plant. The incoming sewage is diverted into a settling area where the flow rate is reduced to allow some solids to settle to the bottom of a tank where an arm sweeps them up. Other solids that float are skimmed off with a rake. Items range in size from cigarette butts and bottle caps to Christmas trees and mattresses. On rare occasions human corpses will be found, which results in the plant being shut down and the police called.

When the Ward's Island plant was built, New York City was using a combined sewer system, which mixed surface runoff with sanitary sewer discharge. This resulted in a great deal of debris entering the sewage treatment plants, especially after storms. In a 1944 paper, Wellington Donaldson, Director of the Bureau of Sewage Disposal, listed timbers, coal, bricks, concrete slabs and hot water boilers, adding that "One wonders how people can go to so much trouble to put such objects into a public sewer". These items are removed by trash racks, which represent the rate-limiting step in processing. When the plant first went into operation, an unexpectedly large amount of debris was encountered, due to one of the main sewer lines feeding the plant having never been cleaned out since its original construction.

Both the Bronx and Manhattan grit chambers were originally equipped with trash racks which had to be manually cleaned; these were later replaced by mechanical units which remove debris automatically. Both locations were equipped with cranes to assist in loading the removed material onto trucks for disposal after the material has been sprayed with a disinfectant. The Bronx facility was reported to process 95 million US gal (360 million L), resulting in 98 cubic feet (2.8 m^{3}) of screenings per day.

=== Grease recovery ===
During World War II, as part of a war effort project at the Ward's Island, Bowery Bay, Coney Island, and Jamaica sewage plants, recovery of grease was started in 1943. Each plant utilized a slightly different process, depending on the exact design of the plant. At Ward's Island, manually operated wire mesh dippers were used to remove floating scum from the preliminary collection tanks and transfer it into metal drums. Previous to this collection effort, the scum collected at the Ward's Island plant was burned, although the other plants had digesters which could process it into commercially valuable biogas.

In June-December 1943, 650,000 pounds (290,000 kg) of scum was collected across the four plants. The raw scum consisted of approximately 53% water, 37% ether-soluble fat, and 10% impurities and was sold to commercial firms specializing in the processing of waste fat for 0.8 cents per pound (1.8 cents per kilogram). A total of $5,206 (equivalent to $75,300 in 2024) was sold for this seven-month period. The contract was renewed for the same price in 1944, at which time it was speculated that the process would no longer be profitable after the conclusion of the war.
