= Michael J. McGuire =

American engineer, laboratory director and writer

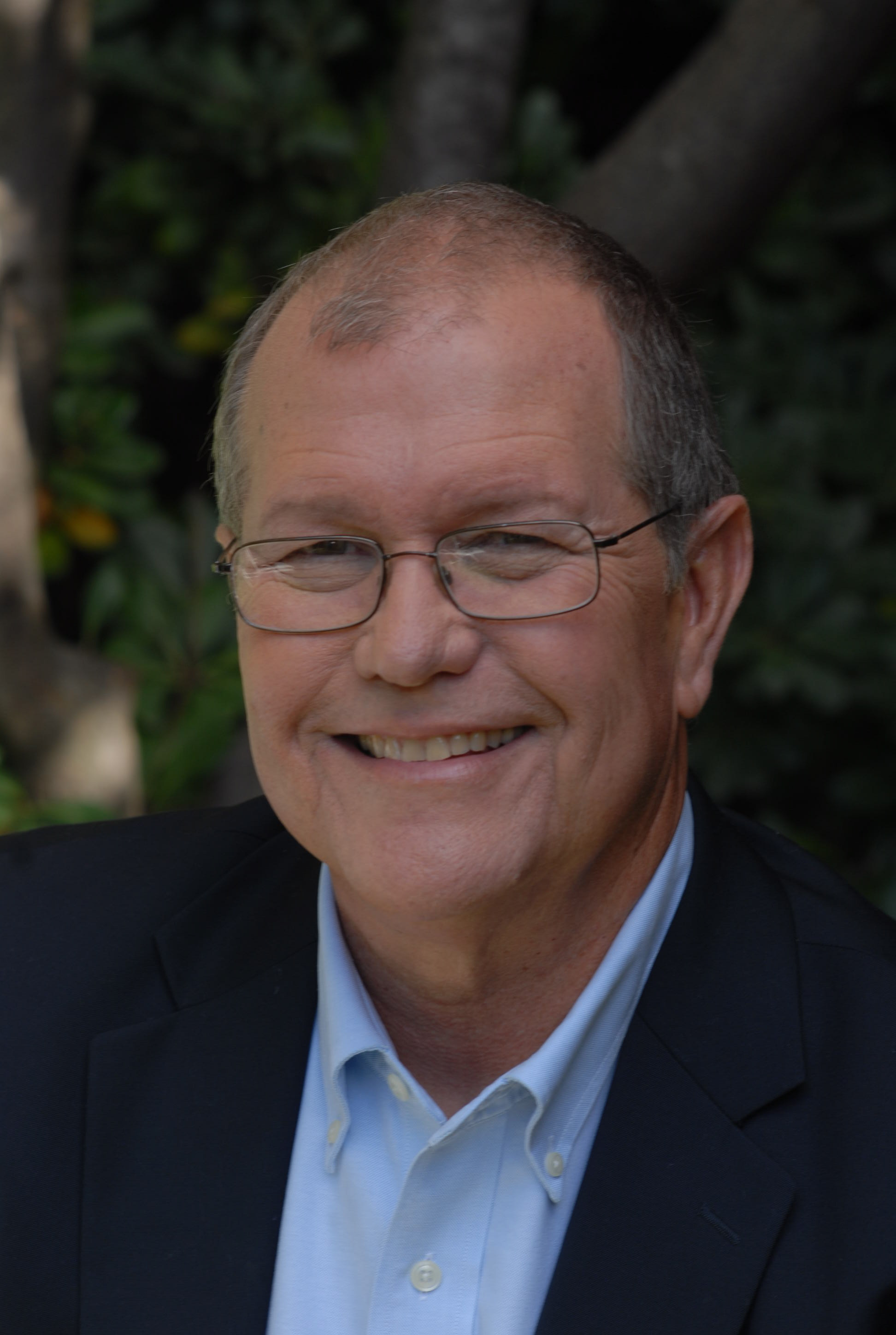
- Born: June 29, 1947 (age 79); San Antonio, Texas, U.S.
- Education: BS in Civil Engineering, University of Pennsylvania, 1969; MS in Environmental Engineering, Drexel University, 1972; PhD in Environmental Engineering, Drexel University, 1977.
- Occupations: Environmental engineer, laboratory director and writer
- Known for: Creating advances in the safety and aesthetics of drinking water
- Awards: George Warren Fuller Award, American Water Works Association, 1994; Publications Award, AWWA, 2001; George A. Elliot Award, CA NV Section, AWWA, 2005; Honorary Membership AWWA, 2006; A.P. Black Research Award, AWWA, 2009; Elected to National Academy of Engineering, 2009.

Michael John McGuire (born June 29, 1947) is an American environmental engineer, laboratory director and writer whose career has focused on drinking water quality improvement. He has been recognized for his expertise in the control of trace organic compounds, inorganic contaminants and microbial pathogens in water. He is also known for his work in the identification, control and treatment of taste and odor problems in drinking water. McGuire combined the development of taste and odor analytical methods (where reliable methods to solve these problems did not exist) along with in situ treatment and oxidation. He developed a solution to the Metropolitan Water District of Southern California's (19 million customers) problem with trihalomethanes using ozone, peroxone and chloramines. He has published numerous articles in professional journals and he has been the co-editor of five books and compilations of articles. He published a book that documented the first continuous disinfection of a drinking water supply in the U.S. With Marie S. Pearthree, he wrote a book on the corrosive water debacle in Tucson, Arizona in 1992–94. He has been active in the American Water Works Association, and he has served as a volunteer and officer in that organization. In 2009, he was elected to the National Academy of Engineering.

== Early life ==
Michael J. McGuire was born in 1947 at Brooke General Army Hospital in San Antonio, Texas. He attended grammar school in a number of locations, because his father was in the U.S. Army and stationed in several places during McGuire's early years. From 1955 to 1957, McGuire attended the grammar school run for U.S. Army dependents in Orléans, France. He went to Francis C. Hammond High School in Alexandria, Virginia.

== Education ==
He earned his undergraduate degree in civil engineering at the University of Pennsylvania in 1969. During the period 1970 to 1972, he attended Drexel University part-time while he worked for the Philadelphia Water Department. After earning his master's degree in Environmental Engineering in 1972, he returned to Drexel University on a full-time basis to study for his PhD degree under Dr. I.H. (Mel) Suffet who is an analytical and environmental chemist. He completed his PhD and graduated in 1977. While at Drexel, he developed a direct water injection, gas chromatography analytical method for four "polarity probe" compounds: 1,4-dioxane, methyl ethyl ketone (or butanone), 1-butanol and nitromethane.

== Personal life ==
Water sports are a major personal activity for him. McGuire rowed crew in high school and in his freshman year at the University of Pennsylvania. He is an active PADI-certified scuba diver logging over 500 dives since 1973. He swims laps for exercise, and he sails in the waters off Southern California and Mexico aboard Water Guy a Beneteau Oceanis 40.1.

In 1971, Deborah Marrow and he were married in Scarsdale, NY. In 2019, he was widowed. Their two children live in the Los Angeles area.

== Early career ==
McGuire worked for the Philadelphia Water Department from 1969 to 1973. Throughout this period, he was assigned to the Research and Development Unit under Joseph V. Radziul. He participated in a variety of projects including the supervision of a research program that involved the surveillance of the water quality of the Delaware River Estuary. The program required operational supervision of a boat pilot, chemists, engineers, and technicians and the formulation of a data analysis program. He designed an unusual application of automated water quality analytical equipment aboard a research vessel. His other projects included investigation of the availability of future water resources, preparation of testimony given before governmental bodies, and investigation of the effects of urbanization on water quality and quantity.

== Metropolitan Water District of Southern California ==
McGuire moved to California in 1977 where he had a two-year stint with the consulting engineering firm, Brown and Caldwell. In 1979, he was offered a position as a water quality engineer with the Metropolitan Water District of Southern California (Metropolitan). He directed a variety of physical chemical treatment and environmental chemistry projects, and he ran the central water laboratory for Metropolitan. As Water Quality Manager and Director of Water Quality for Metropolitan he supervised the Water Quality Branch and Division, respectively, which grew to a total of 82 scientists, engineers and administrators.

During this period he designed a comprehensive research program to determine the cause of earthy musty odor problems in six southern California reservoirs. Because no analytical methods existed for these odorous compounds, McGuire developed a closed-loop-stripping analysis (CLSA) technique capable of detecting less than 5 parts per trillion in drinking water. Supporting the CLSA results McGuire adapted the Flavor Profile Analysis method from the food and beverage industry to drinking water. Using trained human panel members it was possible to detect geosmin and MIB far below 5 parts per trillion. Once the cause was isolated to blue-green algae growing on the bottom of the reservoirs, he devised a methodology to control the growth of the algae and prevent the occurrence of taste and odor problems in the Metropolitan service area.

In 1984–85, he managed the conversion of Metropolitan's secondary disinfection system from free chlorine to chloramines. In 1986, he recommended that the complete control of the trihalomethane and taste and odor problems required installation of ozone and PEROXONE at all five Metropolitan treatment plants (total capacity of over 2,000 mgd). Studies leading to implementation of ozone included bench, pilot and a demonstration-scale ozone treatment plant costing $17 million to construct. The 5.5 mgd Oxidation Demonstration Plant was put into service in 1992 and won the Grand Prize for Research from the American Academy of Environmental Engineers and Scientists. Full-scale installation of this new ozone technology was completed by Metropolitan in 2017 at a total cost of $1.3 billion.

The growth in laboratory staff and sophisticated analytical equipment required additional laboratory space. In concert with a consulting architect, McGuire programmed a new 28,000 square-foot, green-field laboratory which was constructed and opened in 1985.

In 1990, he became Assistant General Manager at Metropolitan where he was responsible for administration and environmental compliance. Five divisions reported to him in addition to Metropolitan's Affirmative Action Officer.

== Consulting firms and other assignments ==
In 1992, McGuire left Metropolitan and opened a one-man consulting engineering firm—McGuire Environmental Consultants, Inc. (MEC). After five years, he started to grow the firm until it ultimately had 37 employees in three offices: Santa Monica and Newport Beach, California and Denver, Colorado. During the period 1992 to 2000, McGuire was the translator for the Technology Working Group that fed information to the multi-stakeholder regulatory negotiations process (including the USEPA) which resulted in the adoption of five landmark drinking water regulations: Interim Surface Water Treatment Rule, Stage 1 Disinfectants and Disinfection Byproducts Rule, Information Collection Rule, Long Term 2 Enhanced Surface Water Treatment Rule and Stage 2 Disinfectants and Disinfection Byproducts Rule.

In April 2005, the national engineering firm Malcolm Pirnie, Inc. purchased MEC. McGuire worked for Malcolm Pirnie, Inc. for a little more than three years as a vice president while he managed the Santa Monica, California office. He managed several major investigations including a demonstration project that showed how chlorite ion could control nitrification, and bench- and pilot-scale projects with Glendale, California that demonstrated the most cost-effective ways to remove hexavalent chromium from drinking water.

In August 2008, he left Malcolm Pirnie and opened up a one-man consulting firm, Michael J. McGuire, Inc. He has been providing consulting services in the field of drinking water quality to water utilities and related clients.

From 2010 to 2014, he was a lecturer at the University of California, Los Angeles where he taught a course in water treatment plant design. In 2014, he was appointed as adjunct professor at UCLA where he taught courses in the Civil and Environmental Engineering Department and the Institute of Environment and Sustainability. From 2014 to 2016, he was the Editor-in-Chief of the Journal American Water Works Association.

McGuire is a registered professional engineer in California, Arizona (inactive), Pennsylvania, New Jersey (inactive) and Texas (inactive). He is also a Board Certified Environmental Engineer through the American Academy of Environmental Engineers and Scientists.

== Publications ==
McGuire is a widely published author who has written and presented over 300 professional articles and co-edited five books and collected works. Subject areas for his publications include: treatment plant optimization, activated carbon adsorption of organic compounds, corrosion of distribution system materials, occurrence and control of disinfection byproducts, identification and control of tastes and odors, removal of asbestos fibers, perchlorate removal, control of chloramines and nitrification, removal of hexavalent chromium, compliance with drinking water regulations, oxidation with ozone and PEROXONE and the history of drinking water disinfection. In 2013, he wrote, The Chlorine Revolution: Water Disinfection and the Fight to Save Lives which was published by the American Water Works Association. With Marie S. Pearthree, he wrote and published Tucson Water Turnaround: Crisis to Success through AWWA.

== Professional associations ==
McGuire has been a member of a number of professional associations. Since 1971, he has been active in the American Water Works Association. He was Vice President of AWWA from 1994 to 1996. He is a Life Member of the Water Environment Foundation with over 40 years of involvement. He has been a member of Sigma Xi, the Scientific Research Society, American Academy of Environmental Engineers, American Chemical Society, American Society of Civil Engineers and the International Water Association.

He has participated in several committees of the National Research Council of the National Academies.

== Awards ==
- 2000 Excellence in Environmental Engineering, American Academy of Environmental Engineers, Grand Prize for Planning, with Tucson Water and Malcolm Pirnie, Inc.
- 2008 Consulting Engineers and Land Surveyors of California, Engineering Excellence, Honor Award, with Glendale Water and Power
- 2008 Avid Advocate Award, Malcolm Pirnie, Inc., Award recognizes supervisors and managers who provide staff with learning opportunities and guidance through coaching, mentoring and professional development
- 2008 Excellence in Environmental Engineering, American Academy of Environmental Engineers, Grand Prize for Research, with Glendale Water and Power

== Honors ==
McGuire received the George Warren Fuller Award in 1994 from AWWA. In 2001, he received the Publications Award from AWWA which is given to “recognize and honor the most notable contribution, scientific or practical, to the public water supply profession as published in the Journal AWWA….” In 2005 he received the George A. Elliot Award from the CA-NV Section AWWA and he was selected as an Honorary Member of AWWA in 2006. In 2009, he was elected to the National Academy of Engineering. and he was presented with the A.P. Black Research Award by AWWA. The citation for his election to the NAE reads “For scientific contributions that have improved the safety and aesthetics of drinking water.” In 2014, McGuire received the Dr. John L. Leal Award from AWWA. The award is given "for distinguished service to the water profession in commemoration of the sound medical/public health expertise and the courageous leadership advancing public health that characterized the life of Dr. John L. Leal." McGuire received the Abel Wolman Award of Excellence in 2016 from the American Water Works Association. The Abel Wolman Award is given “to recognize those whose careers in the water works industry exemplify vision, creativity and excellent professional performance characteristic of Abel Wolman's long and productive career.”

On February 20, 2025, the laboratory at the Metropolitan Water District of Southern California was named: the “Michael J. McGuire Water Quality Laboratory” for his contributions to Metropolitan and his lifelong obsession with protecting public health.

== See also ==
- List of members of the National Academy of Engineering
- Stuart W. Krasner

== Selected list of articles ==
- McGuire, M.J., Suffet, I.H., and Radziul, J.V. (1978). "Assessment of Unit Processes for the Removal of Trace Organic Compounds from Drinking Water." Jour. AWWA. 70:10, 565 572.
- McGuire, M.J., and Suffet, I.H. (1978). "Adsorption of Organics from Domestic Water Supplies." Jour. AWWA. 70:11, 621 636.
- McGuire, M.J., Krasner, S.W., Hwang, C.J., and Izaguirre, G. (1981). "Closed Loop Stripping Analysis as a Tool for Solving Taste and Odor Problems." Jour. AWWA. 73:10, 530 537.
- McGuire, M.J., Krasner, S.W., Hwang, C.J., and Izaguirre, G. (1983). "An Early Warning System for Detecting Earthy Musty Odors in Reservoirs." Water Science and Technology. 15:6/7, 267 277.
- Krasner, S.W., McGuire, M.J., and Ferguson, V.B. (1985). "Tastes and Odors: The Flavor Profile Method." Jour. AWWA. 77:3, 34 39.
- McGuire, M.J. and Meadow, R.G. (1988). "AWWARF Trihalomethane Survey." Jour. AWWA. 80:1, 61–68.
- McGuire, M.J., Lieu, N.I. and Pearthree, M.S. (1999). “Using Chlorite Ion to Control Nitrification.” Jour. AWWA. 91:10, 52–61.
- McGuire, M.J., and Graziano, N. (2002). “Trihalomethanes in U.S. Drinking Water: NORS to ICR.” in Information Collection Rule Data Analysis, edited by M.J. McGuire, J.L. McLain and A. Obolensky. Denver, Colorado:American Water Works Association Research Foundation.
- McGuire, M.J., Pearthree, M.S., Blute, N.K., Arnold, K.F. and Hoogerwerf, T. (2006). “Nitrification Control by Chlorite Ion at Pilot-Scale.” Jour. AWWA. 98:1, 95–105.
- McGuire, M.J., Blute, N.K., Seidel, C., Qin, G., and Fong, L. (2006). “Pilot-scale Studies of Hexavalent Chromium Removal From Drinking Water.” Jour. AWWA. 98:2, 134–143.
- McGuire, M.J. (2006). “Eight Revolutions in the History of U.S. Drinking Water Disinfection.” Jour. AWWA. 98:3, 123–149.
- McGuire, M.J. (2008). “100 Years of Chlorination: Dr. John L. Leal and the Jersey City Revolution.” Proceedings of the AWWA Water Quality Technology Conference. Cincinnati, Ohio. November 17, 2008.
- McGuire, M.J., Wu, X., Blute, N.K., Askenaizer, D., and Qin, G. (2009). “Prevention of Nitrification using Chlorite Ion: Results of a Demonstration Project in Glendale, Calif.” Jour. AWWA. 101:10, 47–59.
- McGuire, M.J. (2014). “John L. Leal—The Man and the Award.” Jour. AWWA, 106:8:28.
- McGuire, M.J., Suffet, I.H., & Rosen, J. (2014). "Consumer Panel Estimates of Odor Thresholds for Crude 4-Methylcyclohexanemethanol." Jour. AWWA, 106:10:65.
- McGuire, M.J. (2016). "Roundtable—The Flint Crisis." participants: Janice A. Beecher, Mona Hanna-Attisha, Susan J. Masten, Joan B. Rose. Jour. AWWA, 108:7:26.

== Books and edited works ==
- Suffet, I.H., and McGuire, M.J., eds. (1980). Activated Carbon Adsorption of Organics from the Aqueous Phase. vol. 1. Ann Arbor, Michigan:Ann Arbor Science Publishers, Inc.
- McGuire, M.J., and Suffet, I.H. eds. (1980). Activated Carbon Adsorption of Organics from the Aqueous Phase. vol. 2. Ann Arbor, Michigan:Ann Arbor Science Publishers, Inc.
- McGuire, M.J., and Suffet, I.H. eds. (1983). Treatment of Water by Granular Activated Carbon. Advances in Chemistry Series Number 202. Washington, D.C.:American Chemical Society.
- Hrudey, S.E., McGuire, M.J., and Whitfield, F.B. eds. (1995). Off-Flavours in the Aquatic Environment 1994. Proceedings of the 4th International Symposium on Off-Flavors in the Aquatic Environment, Adelaide, Australia, October 2–7, 1994. Pergamon, Water Science & Technology, 31:11.
- McGuire, M.J., McLain, J.L., and Obolensky, A. eds. (2002). Information Collection Rule Data Analysis. Denver, Colorado:American Water Works Association Research Foundation.
- McGuire, M. J. (2013). The Chlorine Revolution: Water Disinfection and the Fight to Save Lives. Denver, CO:American Water Works Association.
- McGuire, M. J., and Pearthree, M.S. (2020). Tucson Water Turnaround: Crisis to Success. Denver, CO:American Water Works Association.
