= William Ripley Nichols =

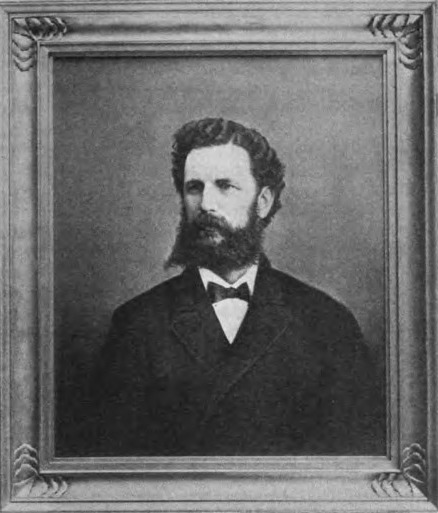
- Born: 30 April 1847
- Died: 14 July 1886
- Education: Massachusetts Institute of Technology
- Occupation: Chemist
- Employer: Massachusetts Institute of Technology

William Ripley Nichols (April 30, 1847 – July 14, 1886) was an American chemist.

== Early life ==
Nichols was born in Boston, Massachusetts. He graduated from the Massachusetts Institute of Technology in 1869, and served there as instructor and assistant professor until 1872, when he was elected professor of general chemistry, which chair he retained until his death in Hamburg, Germany.

== Later life ==
Professor Nichols was recognized as an authority on sanitation, and particularly on water purification, published numerous papers on municipal water supplies, and was active in the pioneering work of the Lawrence Experiment Station. He also performed research at the request of the Massachusetts Board of Health on train ventilation, particularly of smoking cars. He was a member of the American Academy of Arts and Sciences, the American Association for the Advancement of Science, of which he was Vice President in 1885, and of the German Chemical Society.

== Selected works ==
- Compendious Manual of Qualitative Analysis, by Charles W. Eliot and Frank H. Storer, with Nichols' revisions, 1872.
- An Elementary Manual of Chemistry, abridged from Eliot and Storer, New York, 1S72.
- Water Supply, mainly from a Chemical and Sanitary Standpoint, 1883.
- Experiments in General Chemistry, with Lewis M. Norton, Boston : private printing, 1884.
