= Thomas Fitch Rowland Prize =

The Thomas Fitch Rowland Prize is awarded annually by the American Society of Civil Engineers (ASCE). Established in 1882, the prize is named after Thomas Fitch Rowland, a pioneering engineer in construction and infrastructure.

Each year, the award honors a single outstanding contribution to the advancement of construction engineering by recognizing the authors of a peer-reviewed article published in an ASCE journal within the past twelve months.

A list of past winners can be found on the ASCE website.

== List of awardees ==
1883-1899

- 1883 Gustav Lindenthal for "Rebuilding the Monongahela Bridge" Smithfield Street Bridge
- 1884 Hamilton Smith, Jr., author of "Hydraulics, The Flow Of Water Through Orifices, Over Weirs, And Through Open Conduits And Pipes"(1886)
- 1885 A. M. Wellington
- 1886 Charles Conrad Schneider
- 1887 William Metcalf
- 1888 Clemens Herschel
- 1889 James D. Schuyler for work on "Construction of the Sweetwater Dam"
- 1890 Octave Chanute, John Findley Wallace, and William H. Breithaupt, an engineer for railways
- 1891 William H. Burr
- 1892 Samuel M. Rowe, Stillman W. Robinson (brother of Albert Alonzo Robinson), and Henry H. Quimby, all for The Red Rock Cantilever Bridge
- 1893 William Murray Black
- 1894 David L. Barnes
- 1895 William R. Hill
- 1896 H. St. L. Coppee, President of the American Society of Railroad Superintendents
- 1897 Arthur L. Adams
- 1898 Henry C. Goldmark
- 1899 Richard S. Buck, designer of the Niagara Railway Arch Bridge, and the Chief Engineer for the Manhattan Bridge

1900-1999

- 1900 Allen Hazen
- 1901 L. G. Montony Ninety-Sixth Street Power Station of the Metropolitan Street Railway Company of New York City
- 1902 William W. Harts for "Description of Coos Bay, Oregon and Improvement of its Entrance by the Government"
- 1903 George W. Fuller
- 1904 George Cecil Kenyon for "Dock Improvements at Liverpool"
- 1905 Charles L. Harrison and Silas H. Woodard for "Lake Cheesman Dam and Reservoir" (Colorado)
- 1906 George B. Francis and W.F. Dennis for "The Scranton Tunnel of the Lackawanna and Wyoming Valley Railroad"
- 1907 James D. Schuyler for "Recent practice in Hydraulic-Fill Dam Construction"
- 1908 Edward E. Wall for "Water Purification in St. Louis, Mo."
- 1909 William J. Wilgus for "The Electrification of the Suburban Zone of the New York Central Railroad ..."
- 1910 John H. Gregory
- 1911 B. H. M. Hewett and W. L. Brown
- 1912 Eugene Klapp and W. J. Douglas
- 1913 Burgis G. Coy
- 1914 H. T. Cory
- 1915 Charles W. Staniford
- 1916 E. L. Sayers and A. C. Polk
- 1917 John Vipond Davies
- 1918 F. W. Scheidenhelm
- 1919 O. H. Ammann
- 1920 Charles Evan Fowler
- 1921 Ernest E. Howard
- 1922 Gustav Lindenthal
- 1923 F. W. Peek, Jr.
- 1925 H. De B. Parsons
- 1926 Nichlas S. Hill, Jr.
- 1927 L. S. Stiles
- 1928 Roderick B. Young
- 1929 D. B. Steinman and William G. Grove
- 1930 R. Mcc. Beanfield
- 1931 Samuel A. Greeley and William D. Hatfield
- 1932 Clifford Allen Betts
- 1933 J. C. Baxter
- 1934 Miles I. Killmer
- 1935 W. H. Kirkbride
- 1936 A. V. Karpov and R. L. Templin
- 1937 Eugene A. Hardin
- 1940 J. D. Galloway
- 1941 O. J. Todd and S. Eliassen
- 1942 Shortridge Hardesty and Alfred Hedefine
- 1943 Paul Baumann
- 1944 Eugene L. Grant
- 1945 Donald N. Becker
- 1946 James B. Hays
- 1947 Robert F. Blanks; Harmon S. Meissner
- 1948 M. M. Fitzhugh; J. S. Miller; Karl Terzaghi
- 1949 Harold M. Westergaard
- 1950 R. N. Bergendoff; Josef Sorkin
- 1951 William K. Boyd and Charles R. Foster
- 1952 Clarence E. Keefer
- 1953 E. Montford Fucik
- 1954 A. Warren Simonds
- 1955 Maurice N. Quade
- 1956 Jonathan Jones
- 1957 Harry N. Hill, Ernest C. Hartman, and John Wood Clark
- 1958 Charles I. Mansur and Robert I. Kaufman
- 1959 J. George Thon and Gordon L. Coltrin
- 1960 Jack W. Hilf
- 1961 H. Bolton Seed, Robert L. McNeill, and Jacques De Guenin
- 1962 James D. Parsons
- 1963 Marvin J. Kudroff
- 1964 Francis E. Mullen
- 1965 Kent S. Ehrman
- 1966 L. Earl Tabler, Jr.
- 1967 John W. Kinney, Herman Rothman, and Frank Stahl
- 1968 C. Y. Lin
- 1969 James Douglas
- 1970 Norman L. Liver
- 1971 Richard E. Whitaker
- 1972 Hans Sacrison
- 1973 John V. Bartlett, Tadeusz M. Noskiewicz, and James A. Ramsay
- 1974 Russell C. Borden and Carl E. Selander
- 1976 Daniel J. Smith, Jr.
- 1977 Thor L. Anderson and Melvin C. Williams
- 1978 Charles H. Thornton and Paul A. Gossen
- 1979 Marcello H. Soto
- 1980 Laurent Hamel and David M. Nixon
- 1981 C. V. Knudsen
- 1982 Alfred M. Petrofsky
- 1983 James E. Olyniec
- 1984 Yuzo Takeuchi and Akira Kitamura
- 1985 Samir G. Mattar
- 1986 James L. Lammie and Dhirajlal P. Shah
- 1987 James T. O'connor and Richard L. Tucker
- 1988 Warren L. Schroeder, Vincent W. Rybel, and Larry Cochran
- 1989 Victor E. Sanvido
- 1990 Roozbeh Kangari, J. Doug Pruitt, and Tariq S. Cheema
- 1991 H. Randolph Thomas, Victor E. Sanvido, and Steve R. Sanders
- 1992 Michael C. Vorster and Jesus M. De La Garza
- 1993 Kenneth F. Reinschmidt, F.H. Griffis, and Patrick L. Bronner
- 1994 John G. Everett and Alexander H. Slocum
- 1995 Walter C. Hornaday, Ii, Carl T. Haas, James T. O'connor, and Jin Wen
- 1996 Kevin D. Swiggum, Stuart D. Anderson, and Jeffrey S. Russell
- 1997 James E. Diekmann and Matthew J. Girard
- 1999 Terry Brown and James Doebler

2000–present

- 2001 Keith R. Molenaar, Simon P. Washington, and James E. Diekman
- 2002 Lawrence C. Bank; T. Russell Gentry; Kenneth H. Nuss; Stephanie H. Hurd; Anthony J. Lamanna; Stephen J. Duich; Ben Oh
- 2003 Simaan Abourizk; Dany Hajjar
- 2004 Ronie Navon; Eytan Goldschmidt
- 2005 J. M. Lopes Cordeiro; Paulo Jorge De Sousa Cruz
- 2006 Mark R. Svinkin
- 2007 Amr A. Kandil; Khaled El-Rayes
- 2009 John E. Taylor
- 2011 Gunnar Lucko; Eddy M. Rojas
- 2014 Sungjoo Hwang, Moonseo Park, Hyun-Soo Lee, SangHyun Lee, and Hyunsoo Kim
- 2015 Mounir El Asmar, Awad S. Hanna, and Wei-Yin Loh
- 2016 Vitaliy Priven and Rafael Sacks
- 2017 Mohammad Ilbeigi, Baabak Ashuri, and Soheil Shayegh
- 2018 Sooyoung Choe and Fernanda L. Leite
- 2019 Yang-Ping Yao, Yang-Zhi Ruan, Jun Chen, Yi Geng, Xing Zhang, Bing-Yang Liu, Xiao-Peng Zong, and Gui-Zhen
- 2020 Ibahim S. Aboaleb and Islam El-adaway
- 2021 Ashtad Javanmardi; S. Alireza Abbasian-Hosseini; Min Liu; Simon M. Hsiang
- 2022 Hyosoo Moon, Kwonhyun Kim, Hyun-Soo Lee, Moonseo Park, Trefor P. Williams, Bosik Son, and Jae-Youl Chun
- 2023 Zhongming Xiang, Abbas Rashidi, and Ge Ou
- 2024 Abdolmajid Erfani, Zihui Ma, Qingbin Cui, and Gregory B. Baecher
- 2025 Yoojun Kim and Youngjib Ham

== See also ==
- List of engineering awards
