= Fred Lavis =

Construction engineer

Fred Lavis (January 8, 1871 – November 24, 1950) was an English-born American construction engineer who worked on projects in the United States and Latin America.

== Early life ==
Lavis was born on January 8, 1871 in Torquay. He moved to the United States in 1887. He and his father settled in Boston with relatives and although the elder Lavis chose to return to England, his son remained and became a naturalized citizen in 1904. On December 22, 1902, he married Blanche Biddle. They had one son – Fred Jr. She died from suicide by poisoning in 1942.

== Career ==
Lavis began his engineering career as a rodman in the office of Boston surveyor W. H. Whitney. He then joined the Boston and Maine Railroad, where he worked on a Mystic River wharf project. At the age of 19, he moved to Cuba to work on an iron company's railroad project near Santiago de Cuba. The venture failed in 1892. He then worked on building the Cartagena-Magdalena Railroad in Colombia and the Ferrocarril Chihuahua al Pacífico in Mexico. In 1901, he began working for the Choctaw, Oklahoma and Gulf Railroad. In 1903, he moved to New York City, where he worked on eliminating grade-crossings for the Boston and Maine and New York Central Railroads and created preliminary studies for the New York, Westchester and Boston Railway line from New York City to Port Chester, New York. From 1905 to 1909, he was the resident engineer for the Pennsylvania Railroad's construction of the North River Tunnels.

Lavis then ran his own private engineering practice, specializing in railroads. He worked primarily in Central and South America but was also contracted by railroads in Spain, Italy, and China. He was a consulting engineer during the construction of the Panama Canal. He authored four books Railroad Location Surveys and Estimates (1906), Building the Rapid Transit System of New York City (1915), Instructions to Location Engineers and Field Parties (1916), and Railroad Estimates (1917).

Lavis was an engineer for the New Jersey Highway Commission from 1924 to 1928 and designed the Route 1 Extension. In 1928, he succeeded Minor Cooper Keith as president of International Railways of Central America. He resigned in 1931, but remained involved with the railroad as a consulting engineer. From 1931 to 1933, he was mayor of Scarsdale, New York. In 1932, he performed a transportation survey in the Dominican Republic at the request President Rafael Trujillo. During the Great Depression, Lavis was involved in multiple of bondholder protective groups and committees. From 1938 to 1944, he was a consulting engineer for the Venezuela ministry of public works.

Lavis died on November 24, 1950, in Phoenix, Arizona while visiting his son and grandchildren.

Political offices
Preceded by Robert E. Christie Jr.	Mayor of Scarsdale, New York; 1931–1933	Succeeded by Malcolm Pirnie
