= Lawrence Experiment Station =

Coordinates: 42.6983°N 71.1655°W

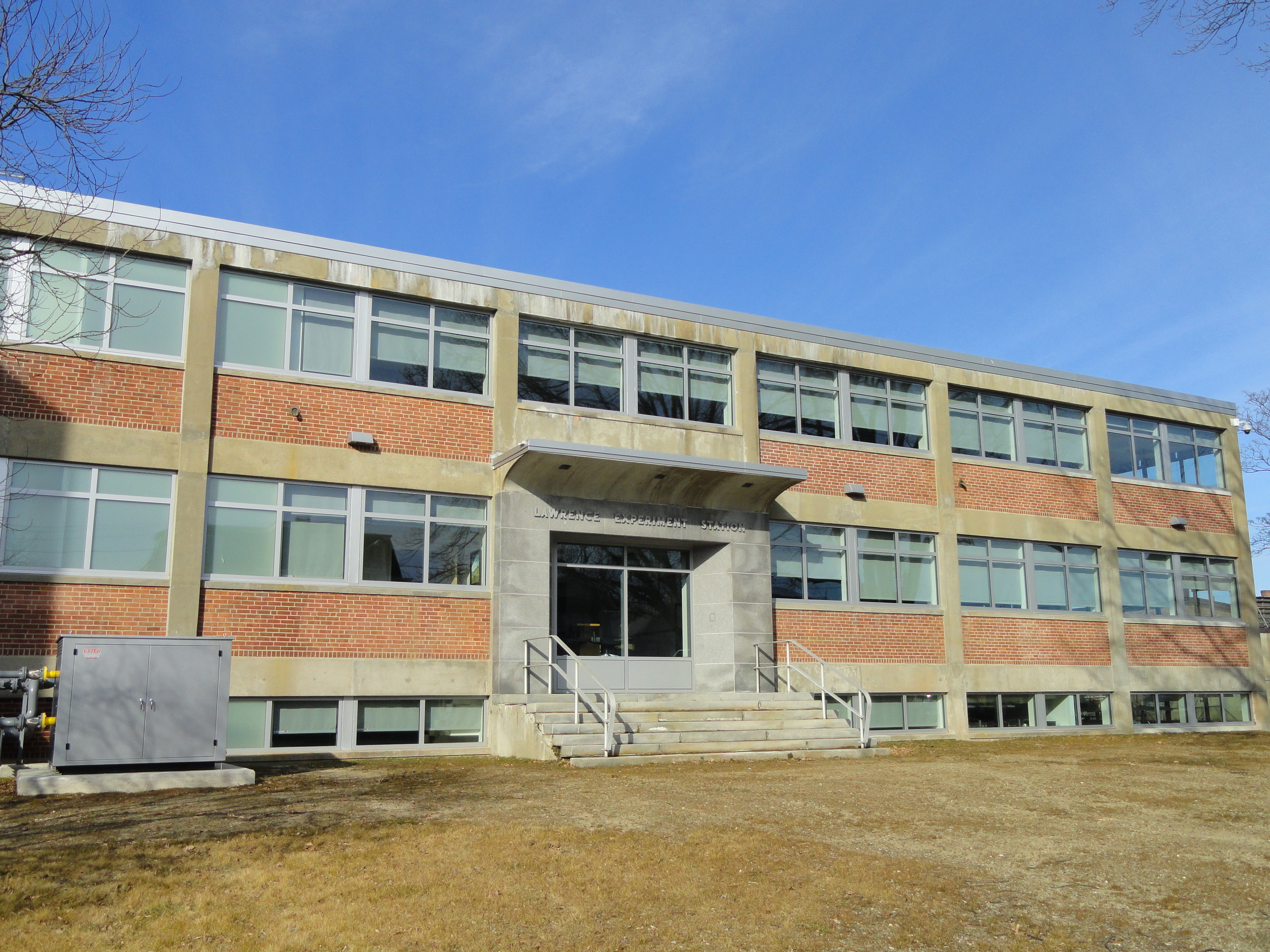
The 1954 building

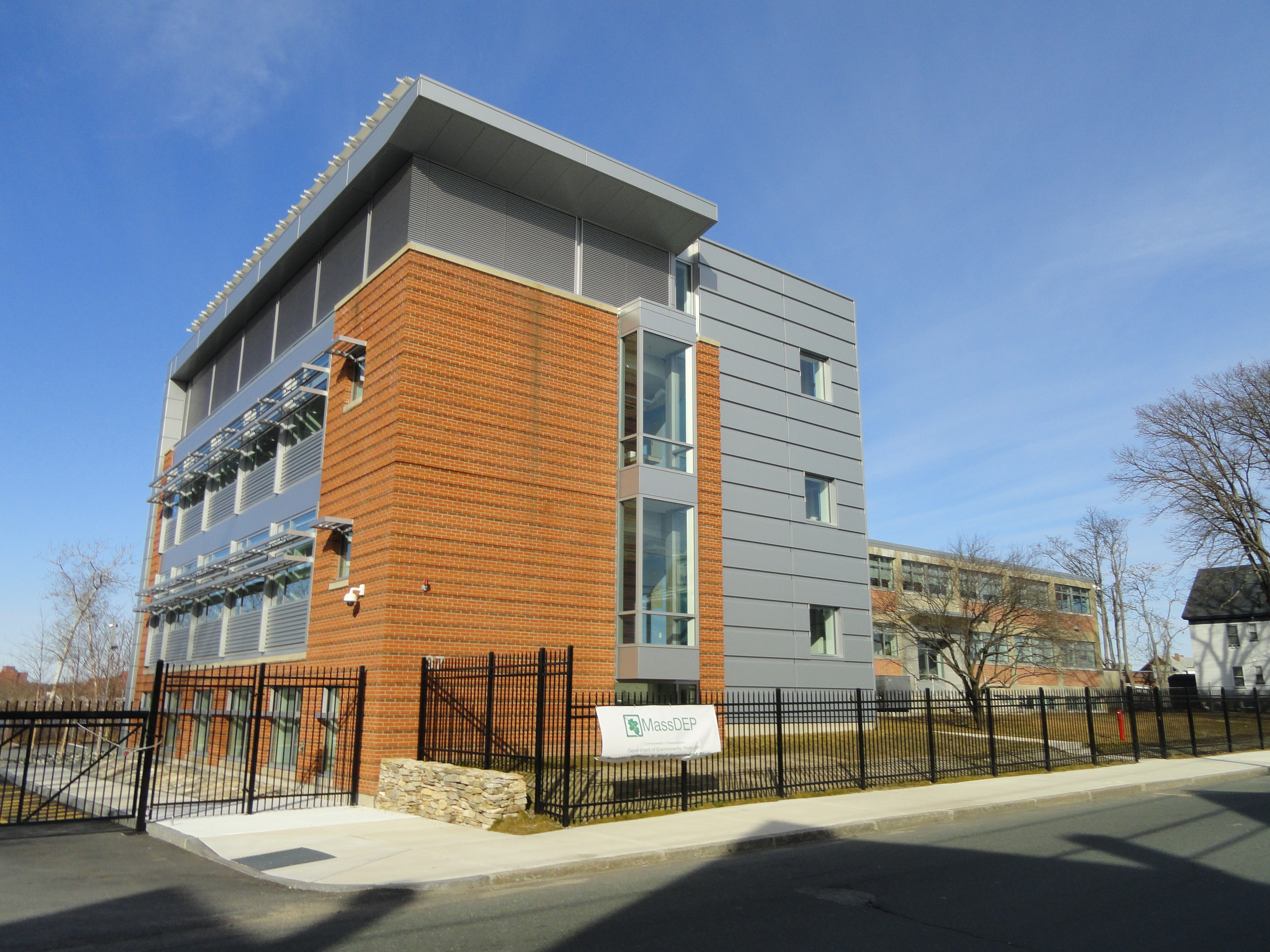
The 2011 addition

The Lawrence Experiment Station, now known as the Senator William X. Wall Experiment Station, was the world's first trial station for drinking water purification and sewage treatment. It was established in 1887 in Lawrence, Massachusetts. A new, 22,000-square-foot (2,000 m^{2}) building opened in 1954 at 37 Shattuck Street. In 1975, the station was designated as a National Historic Civil Engineering Landmark by the American Society of Civil Engineers. In 1993, the facility was renamed after state senator William X. Wall, who had lobbied for the construction of the new station in the 1950s.

== History ==
Lawrence Station was established by the Massachusetts State Board of Health, based on the earlier work of scientists William Thompson Sedgwick and Theobald Smith who understood the linkage of water-borne germs to specific diseases. In 1886 the Massachusetts legislature required its Board of Health to adopt water pollution standards, which led to creation of the station under the direction of Hiram Francis Mills, the "Father of American Sanitary Engineering". MIT professors William Ripley Nichols, Ellen Swallow Richards, and Thomas Messinger Drown also played important early roles. Allen Hazen and George W. Fuller were in charge of some of the earliest research on sewage treatment and drinking water filtration.

At first, the station's main mission was to develop practical methods for treating wastewater. Its task was to determine the effect of filtration as compared to natural oxidation, which it decided by experiments in its chemistry laboratory. During this time, Sedgwick and students invented techniques for identifying and quantitatively analyzing the microorganisms in water and sewage. These studies helped set the standards in Massachusetts, other states, and other countries.

A bacteriological laboratory was added two years later. In 1893 when a typhoid epidemic (Salmonella typhi) arose along the Merrimack River, the City of Lawrence began filtration of river water using Mills' slow sand filters, thus becoming the first American city to filter its water for disease prevention. This filtering led to marked reductions in typhoid fever rate and overall death rate in the city.

The facility is now part of the Massachusetts Department of Environmental Protection (DEP) - Division of Environmental Laboratory Sciences. It is responsible for providing technical and laboratory support to all DEP programs. In 2011, a $30 million, 13,000 square foot expansion was completed. The new LEED certified addition also houses the state occupational safety laboratory.
