= Moses Nelson Baker =

American editor and author (1864–1955)

Moses N. Baker
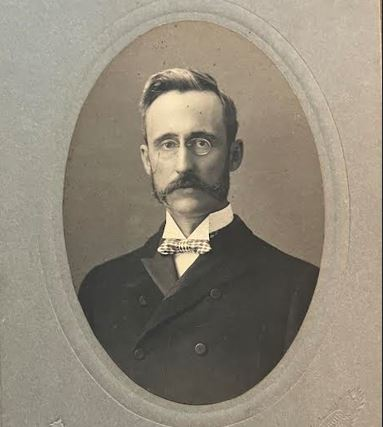
- Baker in 1903
- Born: January 26, 1864; Enosburg, Vermont
- Died: February 7, 1955 (aged 91); Upper Montclair, New Jersey
- Education: Ph.B., University of Vermont, 1886; Civil engineering degree, University of Vermont, 1899.
- Occupations: Editor, writer and public health official
- Known for: Dean of water works authors and editors
- Awards: Water Industry Hall of Fame, American Water Works Association, 1974.

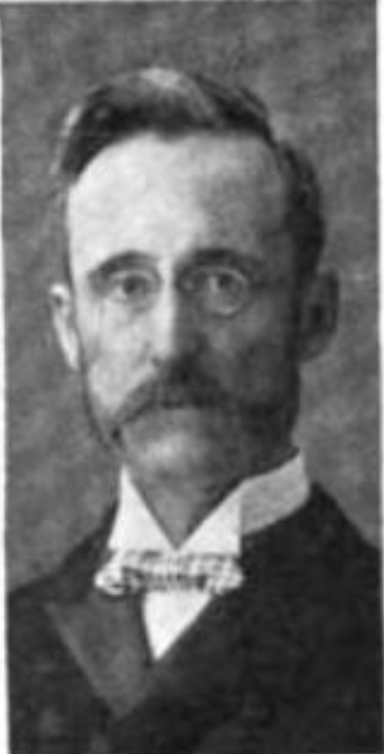
Baker in 1906

Moses N. Baker (January 26, 1864 – February 7, 1955) was a noted editor and author in the field of drinking water history and technology. His most important book is still used today: The Quest for Pure Water: The History of Water Purification from the Earliest Records to the Twentieth Century. He was also active in the field of public health holding several positions on boards of health at the state and local levels.

== Early life and education ==
Baker was born in 1864 in the small town of Enosburg, Vermont, which is located in the northern part of the state a few miles from the Canada–US border. His early education was in the Enosburgh District School and the Craftsbury Academy. At the University of Vermont he obtained a bachelor's degree in philosophy in 1886 and a degree in civil engineering in 1899.

== Career ==
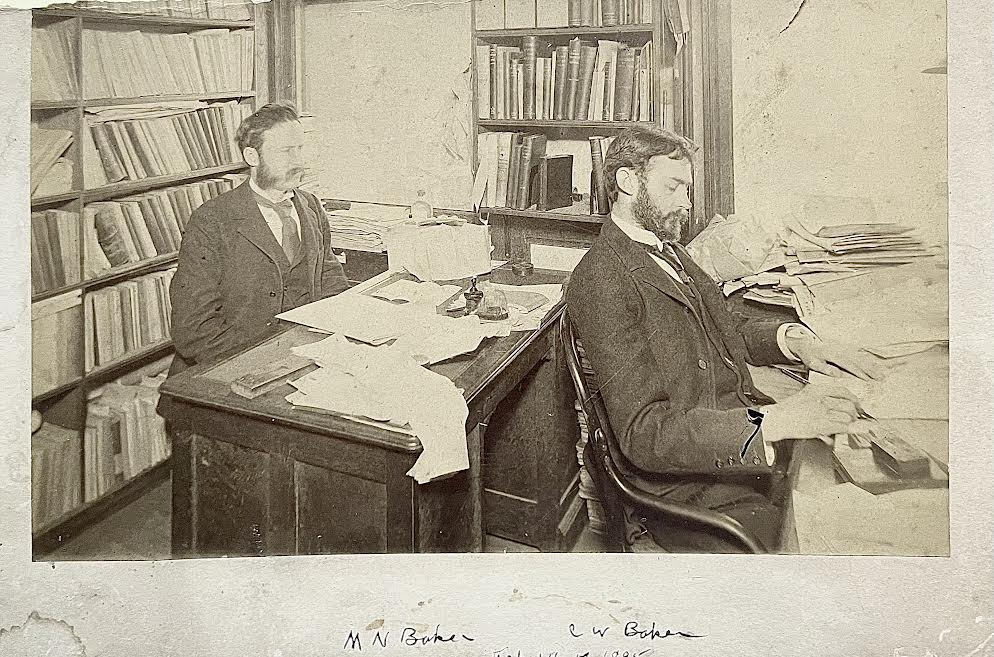
Baker, at his desk on the left

Baker started his long career as author and editor in November 1887 when he was hired as the Associate Editor of Engineering News. This publication and the consolidated weekly Engineering News-Record which began on April 1, 1917, were the definitive sources of news about advances in the control and treatment of drinking water and sewage for decades in the late 19th and early 20th centuries. He retired in 1932 after 45 years of service.

Baker collected a large library of books and source documents that he used to write his most important book, The Quest for Pure Water: The History of Water Purification from the Earliest Records to the Twentieth Century, which was first published in 1948. It was reprinted and published in 1981. He donated his collection to the American Water Works Association which transferred it to the Engineering Societies Library in New York City in 1945 for safe keeping. Unfortunately, the Engineering Societies Library went out of business in 1998 and his entire collection was dispersed.

== Personal life ==
On August 22, 1889, in Burlington, Vermont, he married Ella S. Babbit, daughter of Asher Stevens and Emmeline (Jones) Babbit of Keesville, New York. They had six children: Theta Helen, born in 1890; Will, born in 1892 (deceased 1895); Frederick Wood, born 1894; Elizabeth, born 1896; Ruth, born 1902; and Dorothea, born 1907. The family lived in Upper Montclair, New Jersey for many decades. Baker died on February 7, 1955, and his wife died only 5 weeks later.

== Professional associations and boards ==
Baker was a member of a number of professional organizations and societies including the New England Water Works Association, American Water Works Association and the American Economic Association. He was Chairman of the Executive Committee of the National Municipal League from 1911 to 1918. He was a member of the Montclair, New Jersey Board of Health for 20 years and served as its president from 1904 to 1915. Baker was a member and vice president of the New Jersey Department of Health in 1915-16. He served as President of the New Jersey Sanitary Association in 1904 following the term of John L. Leal.

== Honors and awards ==
He was elected an Honorary Member of the American Water Works Association and he was elected to the Water Industry Hall of Fame by the same organization in 1974.

== Selected publications ==
- Baker, Moses N. (1981). The Quest for Pure Water: the History of Water Purification from the Earliest Records to the Twentieth Century. 2nd Edition. Vol. 1. Denver, Co.: American Water Works Association.
- Baker, Moses N. (1906). Municipal Engineering and Sanitation. London:MacMillan.
- Baker, Moses N. (1904). British Sewage Works and Notes on the Sewage Farms of Paris and on Two German Works. New York:Engineering News Publishing Co.
- Baker, Moses N. (1899). Potable Water and Methods of Detecting Impurities. New York:Van Nostrand.
- Baker, Moses N. ed. (1897). The Manual of American Water-Works. New York City, N.Y.: Engineering News Publishing Co.
- Baker, Moses N. (1893). Sewage Purification in America: A Description of the Municipal Sewage Purification Plants in the United States and Canada. New York City, N.Y.: Engineering Publishing Co.
- Rafter, George W. and Moses N. Baker. (1894). Sewage Disposal in the United States. New York:Van Nostrand.
