= Kent Barwick =

American preservationist

Kent L. Barwick
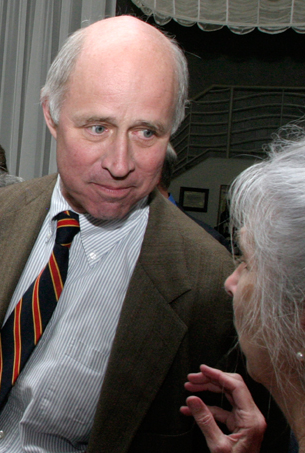
- Occupation: Historic Preservationist
- Years active: 1970 - 2009
- Known for: Preservation of Grand Central Terminal

Kent L. Barwick is a Historic Preservationist who lives and works in New York City. He is best known for partnering with Jacqueline Kennedy Onassis to save Grand Central Terminal, upholding the New York City Landmarks Law in the 1970s, and working with the Municipal Art Society of New York and the Historic Districts Council.

== Early career ==
Barwick graduated from Syracuse University and also attended Harvard University as a Loeb Fellow. Following graduation, he became involved in the Historic Preservation movement after telephoning The New Yorker's prolific writer Joe Mitchell regarding a project in Cooper Square. “In those days you could call The New Yorker and ask to speak to Joe Mitchell, and you could get him," explained Barwick in The New York Times. "Can you imagine?"

== Accomplishments ==
Barwick began a long professional relationship with The Municipal Art Society in 1969. In February 1975, the New York State Supreme Court overturned Grand Central Terminal's New York City Landmark status, which opened the door to a demolition plan by the bankrupt Penn Central railroad. Penn Central planned to demolish the structure, by then shabby, cluttered and dark, in favor of a Marcel Breuer-designed structure in an effort to raise desperately-needed funds. Barwick and Jacqueline Kennedy Onassis successfully campaigned to halt the plan and preserve the station by taking the case to the Supreme Court of the United States in Penn Central Transportation Co. v. New York City.

Barwick proceeded to serve as the Municipal Art Society's executive director from 1970 to 1975 and as its president from 1983 to 1995. He returned as president from 1999 through 2009. He also chaired the New York City Landmarks Preservation Commission and co-founded the Historic Districts Council, which awarded him its Landmarks Lion award in 1997.

== Personal life ==
Barwick resides in Manhattan's Little Italy neighborhood.
