= Life Extension Institute =

Defunct 1913 eugenics and healthful living society

Life Extension Institute was an organization formed in the United States in 1913 with the philanthropic goal of prolonging human life through hygiene and disease prevention. It is now known as EHE Health.

Its organizational officers included many celebrity-philanthropists such as William Howard Taft, Alexander Graham Bell, and Mabel Thorp Boardman but also medical experts including William James Mayo, Russell Henry Chittenden, and J. H. Kellogg and a "Hygiene Reference Board" of dozens of nationally recognized physicians of that era such as Mazÿck Porcher Ravenel and Major General William Crawford Gorgas.

== Activities ==
A major project of the institute which fulfilled its mission to disseminate knowledge was publication of the book How to Live, Rules for Healthful Living Based on Modern Science, now in the public domain.

The institute was a proponent of eugenics including sterilization of grossly "unfit" individuals:

It depends largely upon the action of those now upon the earth, who are now making their choices of marriage, as to whether the races of the future shall be physical, mental or moral weaklings, or whether they shall be physically brave and hardy, mentally broad and profound, and morally sterling.

To summarize: There are three main lines along which eugenic improvement of the race may be attained:

- Education of all people on the inheritability of traits;
- segregation of defectives so that they may not mingle their family traits with those on sound lines;
- sterilization of certain gross and hopeless defectives, to preclude the propagation of their type.

— Irving Fisher and Eugene Lyman Fisk How to Live, Rules for Healthful Living Based on Modern Science

== See also ==
- Longevity escape velocity
