= George W. Fuller =

American engineer (1868–1934)

George Warren Fuller
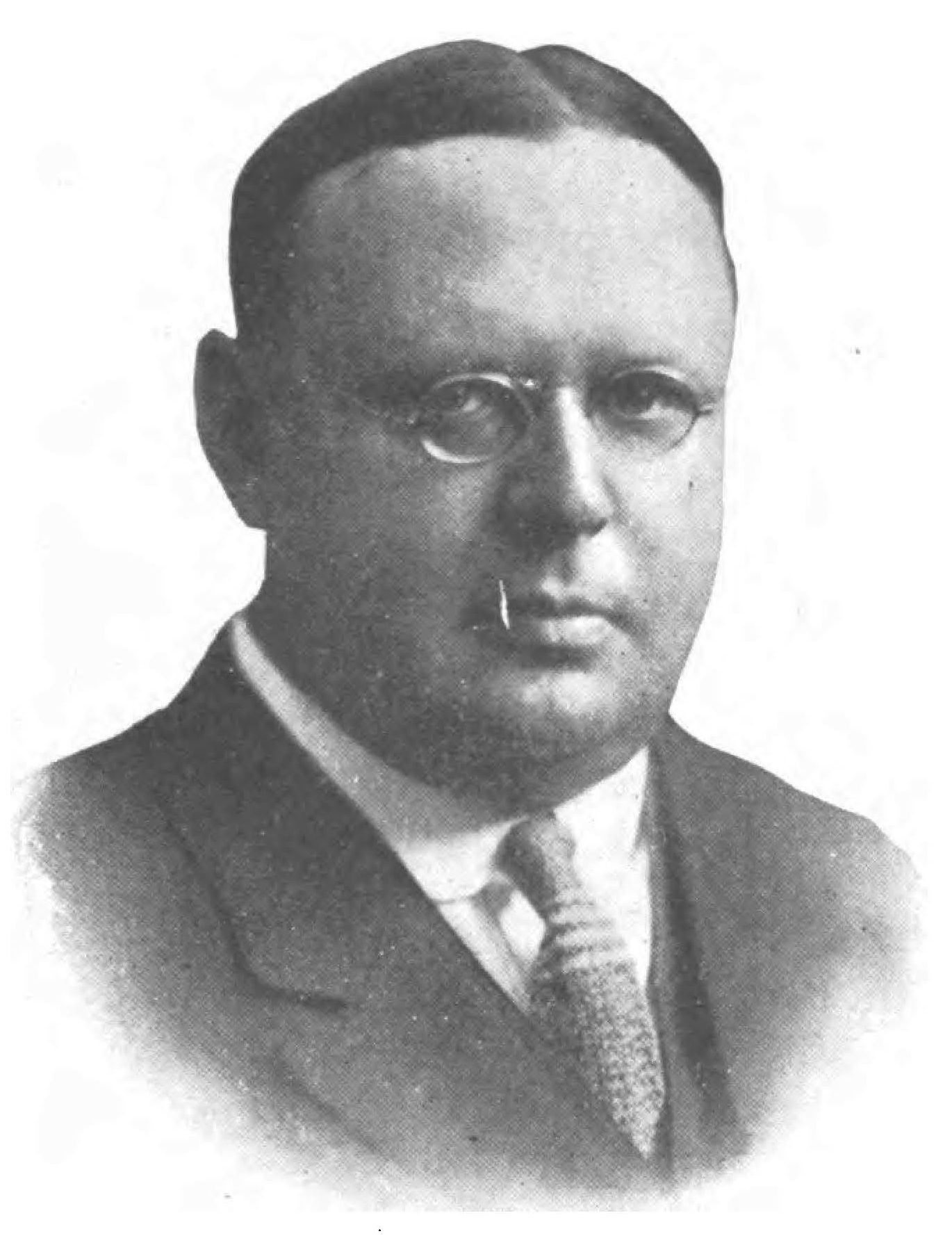
- Fuller in 1917
- Born: December 21, 1868; Franklin, Massachusetts
- Died: June 15, 1934 (aged 65); New York, New York
- Resting place: Evergreen Cemetery, West Medway, Massachusetts
- Education: BS, Massachusetts Institute of Technology, 1890
- Occupation: Consulting sanitary engineer
- Known for: Pre-eminent sanitary engineer of his time
- Awards: Thomas Fitch Rowland Prize, American Society of Civil Engineers (1903); Water Industry Hall of Fame, American Water Works Association (1971)

George Warren Fuller (December 21, 1868 – June 15, 1934) was an American sanitary engineer who was also trained in bacteriology and chemistry. His career extended from 1890 to 1934 and he was responsible for important innovations in water and wastewater treatment. He designed and built the first modern water filtration plant, and he designed and built the first chlorination system that disinfected a U.S. drinking water supply. In addition, he performed groundbreaking engineering work on sewage treatment facilities in the U.S. He was President of both the American Water Works Association and the American Public Health Association, and he was recognized internationally as an expert civil and sanitary engineer.

== Early life and education ==
George W. Fuller was born in Franklin, Massachusetts in 1868. After his primary and secondary education, he was accepted at the Massachusetts Institute of Technology at the age of 16. He deferred his attendance at MIT for one year (beginning 1886) due to the death of his father. At MIT, he studied under William T. Sedgwick and completed his bachelor's degree in chemistry in 1890. Sedgwick was able to send Fuller to Berlin, Germany to study under the chief engineer for the Berlin waterworks, Carl Piefke. During his stay in Berlin, Fuller studied bacteriology at the Hygiene Institute of the University of Berlin.

== Career ==
After returning from Berlin, Fuller started working at the Lawrence Experiment Station in Lawrence, Massachusetts while still under the tutelage of William T. Sedgwick. While at LES, he investigated the treatment of sewage using filtration systems. His most important work was the study of filtration for potable water treatment. His early investigations were designed to increase the filtration rate for slow sand filters so that water treatment facilities could be built on smaller land footprints and, thus, be constructed more economically.

=== Louisville and Cincinnati filtration studies ===
During the period 1895 to 1897, Fuller was hired by the City of Louisville, Kentucky to study water filtration processes for the purpose of purifying Ohio River water for human consumption. The focus of his investigations were on "mechanical filtration" treatment systems (also called rapid sand filtration), which used filtration rates that were 60 times higher than those of slow sand filters. Aluminum sulfate was added prior to filtration to form larger particles that would be amenable to filtration. The work in Louisville made it clear that except for the clearest upland water supplies, a sedimentation treatment step would have to be added prior to filtration to remove the bulk of the suspended particulate matter.

Fuller learned from his Louisville work when he designed the investigations at Cincinnati, Ohio for the purification of Ohio River water. From 1897 to 1899, Fuller investigated mechanical filtration using the addition of aluminum sulfate followed by a sedimentation step before the final filtration process.

=== Water purification ===
After completing the Cincinnati filtration report, Fuller opened a single person consulting practice in New York City. One of his first assignments was from the East Jersey Water Company to design a 30 million gallon per day mechanical filtration plant at Little Falls, New Jersey. The plant was a milestone in public health protection because it incorporated all of Fuller's findings from his research over the previous 10 years and it became the model for the design of subsequent drinking water filtration facilities.

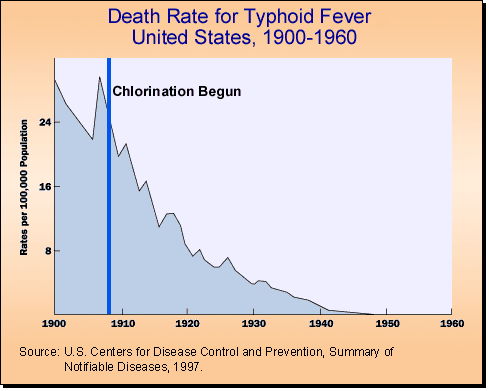
Death rates for typhoid fever in the U.S. 1906–1960

On June 19, 1908, Fuller was hired by John L. Leal to design and build a chlorination system for the Jersey City, New Jersey water supply at Boonton Reservoir on the Rockaway River. Given an impossible deadline as a result of a New Jersey Chancery Court order, Fuller successfully completed the chlorination system in 99 days. John L. Leal developed the basic concept of applying chlorine in the form of a dilute solution of chloride of lime (calcium hypochlorite) at fractions of a ppm. Fuller modeled his chloride of lime feed system on the aluminum sulfate feed system that he designed for the Little Falls Water Treatment Plant. The chlorination facility fed 0.2 to 0.35 ppm of chlorine to an average water flow of 40 million gallons per day from Boonton Reservoir.

Fuller testified as an expert witness for the defendants, the Jersey City Water Supply Company, in both trials that resulted from a lawsuit filed by Jersey City against the water company. The chlorination system that he designed and built was declared a success by the Special Master, William J. Magie, and was judged capable of supplying Jersey City with water that was "pure and wholesome." The success of the Boonton chlorination system was due, in no small part, to the engineering excellence of Fuller. Chlorine use exploded after the positive ruling by Justice Magie and typhoid fever and other waterborne diseases were conquered as a direct result of Fuller's reliable engineering of the first chlorination system.

=== Sewage treatment ===
The foundation of Fuller's expertise in sewage treatment was laid at the Lawrence Experiment Station in Massachusetts. He later went on to design and supervise the construction of some of the most important sewage treatment plants in the U.S. Fuller and his partner Rudolph Hering were responsible for the design of the earliest Imhoff tank sewage treatment facilities in the U.S., which were located in Chatham, New Jersey and Atlanta, Georgia. He wrote two books that defined the state-of-the-art of sewage treatment. At the time of his death, an activated sludge system that he designed was being constructed on Wards Island to handle sewage flows from New York City.

=== Consulting firms ===
Fuller was a consultant to cities, water agencies and sewer authorities for 34 years.

- Single practice, 1899–1901
- Hering and Fuller, 1901–1911
- Fuller and McClintock, 1911–1934

It is estimated that Fuller acted as a consultant to over 150 municipalities and agencies during his career. Besides the design and construction of the Little Falls Treatment Plant, Fuller worked for the cities of New York, Baltimore, Chicago, Washington, D.C., Kansas City, MO, and many others.

== Personal life ==
Fuller was married four times.

- Lucy Hunter, married 1888, deceased 1895, one child: Myron E. Fuller
- Caroline L. Goodloe, married 1899, deceased 1907, two children: John Kemp Goodloe Fuller and Asa W. Fuller
- Charlotte Bell Todd, married 1913, divorced 1918
- Eleanor Todd Burt, married 1918, adopted three sons by Eleanor: Kenneth B. Fuller, Gordon B. Fuller and George B. Fuller

== Professional associations ==
Fuller belonged to over a dozen professional associations during his career. Some of his most important contributions were made while a member of the American Water Works Association (AWWA) and the American Public Health Association (APHA). As part of APHA, he was a member of the early water bacteriology committees that developed standards for the isolation, enumeration and identification of bacteria in water. This early work led to the development of the first edition of Standard Methods for the Examination of Water and Wastewater which is now jointly published by APHA, AWWA and the Water Environment Federation and is in its 22nd edition.

In AWWA he was primarily responsible for the creation of standards of practice which ultimately developed into the AWWA Standards Council which manages standards for chemicals, pipe, and treatment equipment used throughout the world. In recognition of his lifetime of service to the water works profession, AWWA created the George Warren Fuller Award in 1937. The recipients of the award are chosen annually by the Sections of AWWA, and they are selected based on their contributions to the advancement of waterworks practices.
