= Thomas Messinger Drown =

American university president, metallurgist (1842–1904)

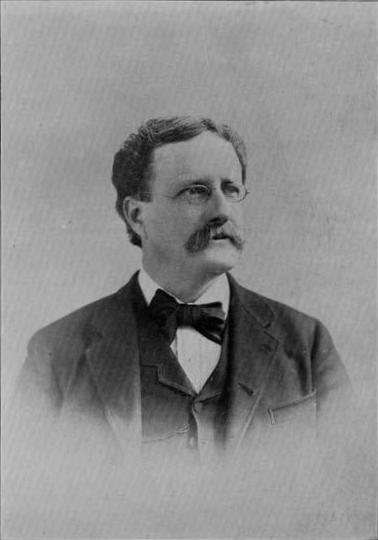
- Born: March 19, 1842; Philadelphia, Pennsylvania, US
- Died: November 17, 1904 (aged 62)
- Title: University President (1895–1904)

Academic background
- Education: University of Pennsylvania; University of Heidelberg

Academic work
- Discipline: chemistry
- Sub-discipline: analytical chemistry metallurgy
- Institutions: Harvard University; Lafayette College; Massachusetts Institute of Technology; Lehigh University

Thomas Messinger Drown (March 19, 1842 – November 17, 1904) was the fourth University President of Lehigh University in Bethlehem, Pennsylvania, United States. He was also an analytical chemist and metallurgist.

== Background ==
He was born in Philadelphia, Pennsylvania, in 1842. He graduated from Central High School in Philadelphia in 1859, and then went on to study medicine at the University of Pennsylvania and graduated in 1862. He went abroad to Germany to study chemistry in Freiberg, Saxony, and mining at the University of Heidelberg. From 1869 to 1870 he was an instructor of metallurgy at Harvard University. In 1870, he started a consulting business in Philadelphia. In 1872, he hired a former student, John Townsend Baker, as an assistant. From 1874 to 1881, he was professor of Analytical Chemistry at Lafayette College. Baker followed him to Lafayette and later would found the J. T. Baker Chemical Co., which merged with Mallinckrodt and was absorbed and spun off of Tyco International as a component company of Covidien. In 1875, he was elected as a member of the American Philosophical Society.

His professional career was interrupted in 1881, when, after the death of his father, he devoted himself to family matters. He restarted his professional work in 1885 by accepting a professorship at the Massachusetts Institute of Technology.

== Massachusetts activity ==
He helped start MIT's chemical engineering curriculum in the late 1880s. In 1887, he was appointed by the newly formed Massachusetts Board of Health to a landmark study of sanitary quality of the state's inland waters. As consulting chemist to the Massachusetts State Board of Health, he was in charge of the famous Lawrence Experiment Station laboratory conducting the water sampling, testing, and analysis. There he put to work the environmental chemist and first female graduate of MIT, Ellen Swallow Richards. This research created the famous "normal chlorine" map of Massachusetts that was the first of its kind and was the template for others. As a result, Massachusetts established the first water-quality standards in America, and the first modern sewage treatment plant was created.

As a professor, Drown published a number of papers on metallurgy, mostly in Transactions of the American Institute of Mining Engineers. He was a founding member of the Institute, and served as its secretary, and editor of its Transactions from 1871 till 1884. He was elected its president in 1897.

== Lehigh presidency ==
In 1895 he left MIT to become the fourth president of Lehigh University. Lehigh's endowment was predominantly in the stock of the major company of its founder, Asa Packer's Lehigh Valley Railroad. The Panic of 1893 crashed the market, brought the country into depression that lasted years, and nearly brought the university to financial insolvency. Many prominent railroads such as the Northern Pacific Railway, the Union Pacific Railroad and the Atchison, Topeka & Santa Fe Railroad went into bankruptcy, and over 15,000 companies and 500 banks failed. In order to gain new sources of funding, President Drown broke the university's ties with the Episcopal Church in 1897, qualifying the university for aid from the Commonwealth of Pennsylvania. During his term, which started during a major financial crisis, he was able to save Lehigh from bankruptcy, grow enrollment, which had dipped seriously, grow academics, and even have one major building erected.

A broad intellectual with interests in various fields, he nonetheless thought the key to Lehigh's success would be the school of technology. There he sought to broaden and deepen the offerings, increase the quality and quantity of laboratory space, equipment and apparatus, as funding permitted. Additionally, and in consultation with the faculty and the board of trustees, he created many new tiers of teaching, including the associate and assistant professorships. His idea was that this would create resources for top professors to be invited to Lehigh, and so help enlarge the curricula. During his tenure, the university's first emeritus professorship was granted (Harding of Physics), and first doctorate awarded (Joseph W. Richards). Many new degrees in the technical school were now being offered, such as Metallurgy (1891), Electrometallurgy, and Chemical Engineering (1902). The curriculum leading to a degree in arts and engineering was established, as was the department of zoology and biology. New courses (majors, that is, or degree offerings, as it is now known) were also adopted in geology, and physics.

Dr. Drown eventually gained in popularity on campus, with his forward ideas, success, idiosyncratic pince-nez glasses and mustache. Faculty members eventually came to refer to Dr. Drown as "chief". Unfortunately, T. M. Drown would not live long enough to see all his ideas to fruition, as he died in office, following abdominal surgery, November 16, 1904.

Williams Hall (1903), a Beaux Arts inspired Brick structure, was erected to house the growing departments of Biology and Geology, among other functions.

In 1908, Lehigh University opened up Drown Hall which now houses Lehigh's English Department.

Preceded by Robert Alexander Lamberton	4th President of Lehigh University; 1895–1904	Succeeded by Henry Sturgis Drinker
