= Malcolm Pirnie =

American civil and consulting engineer

- Born: February 6, 1889; New York City, U.S.
- Died: February 23, 1967 (aged 78); White Plains, New York, U.S.
- Education: Harvard University
- Engineering career
- Awards: Hoover Medal (1948)

Malcolm Pirnie Sr. (February 6, 1889 – February 23, 1967) was an American civil and consulting engineer, pioneer in sanitary engineering, founder of Malcolm Pirnie, Inc., and president of the American Society of Civil Engineers in 1944.

== Early life ==
Pirnie was born in 1889 in New York City as son of George Pirnie and Florence Augusta (Pomeroy) Pirnie. He grew up in Springfield, Massachusetts and studied civil engineering at Harvard University, where he obtained his BSc in 1910, and his MA in 1911.

== Career ==
After graduation in 1911, Pirnie started his career as assistant engineer at the New York City consulting firm Hazen and Whipple, where in 1916 he became partner and the company was renamed Hazen, Everett & Pirnie. During World War I, he was a sanitary engineer with a Red Cross mission in Moscow and served as a captain in the United States Army Transportation Corps. In 1929, Pirnie started his own engineering firm Malcolm Pirnie, Inc. His work focused on water, sewage and sanitation facilities for American military installations. In 1944, he served as president of the American Society of Civil Engineers.

Following World War II, he developed a plan for the industrial control of Germany, which sought to keep the country from having the industrial means to start another war with the least economic disturbance to Western Europe. He devised a similar plan for Japan, which was approved by the United States Department of State and the Allied Control Council. He was awarded the Hoover Medal in 1948 for his postwar work. In 1946 he founded Malcolm Pirnie Engineers with four partners.

== Personal life ==
Pirnie resided in Scarsdale, New York and was active in local government. He was a member the village's board of trustees, served as mayor, and spent two years on the zoning board of appeals.

Pirnie died on February 23, 1967 in the Westchester division on New York Hospital-Cornell Medical Center. He was predeceased by his wife and survived by three children.

His son, Malcolm Pirnie Jr. (1920–1997), followed in his footsteps as chairman of the consulting firm Malcolm Pirnie Inc.

== Selected publications ==
- Malcolm Pirnie. Present and future water supply for the city of Jacksonville, Fla., 1927.

Political offices
| Preceded by Fred Lavis | Mayor of Scarsdale, New York; 1933–1935 | Succeeded by John Milton Hancock |
