= William T. Sedgwick =

American epidemiologist (1855–1921)

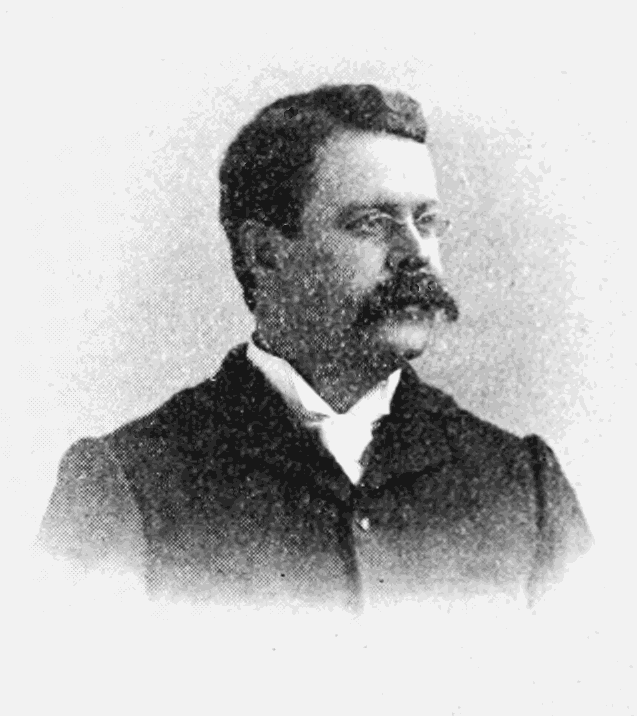
- Sedgwick c. 1905
- Born: William Thompson Sedgwick; December 29, 1855; West Hartford, Connecticut, U.S.
- Died: January 25, 1921 (aged 65); Boston, Massachusetts, U.S.
- Education: Yale University (BS); Johns Hopkins University (PhD)
- Occupations: Epidemiologist; bacteriologist
- Known for: Sedgwick Memorial Medal
- Spouse: Mary Katrine Rice (m. 1881)
- Scientific career
- Workplaces: Massachusetts Institute of Technology

William Thompson Sedgwick (December 29, 1855 – January 25, 1921) was an American epidemiologist, bacteriologist, teacher, and a key figure in shaping public health in the United States.

Focused on eliminating typhoid, Sedgwick helped create the Sedgwick–Rafter method, a way to count the prevalence of waterborne microorganisms. He later advocated for the United States' first citywide sand filter for water purification, installed in Lawrence, Massachusetts.

He was president of many scientific and professional organizations during his lifetime, including president of the American Public Health Association in 1915. He was one of three founders of the joint MIT-Harvard School of Public Health in 1913. The Sedgwick Memorial Medal is named after him.

== Early life and education ==
William Thompson Sedgwick was born on December 29, 1855, in West Hartford, Connecticut, the son of William Sedgwick and Anne Thompson Sedgwick. In 1877, he received his Bachelor of Science in biology from the Sheffield Scientific School at Yale University. He studied for two years at the Yale School of Medicine, where he was also an instructor in physiological chemistry in 1878–79. He left Yale to take up studies at Johns Hopkins University in physiology. He became interested in biology and changed his course of study, graduating with a PhD in biology in 1881. He remained at Hopkins for two years as an associate in biology.

== Massachusetts Institute of Technology ==
In 1883, Sedgwick was appointed to the faculty at MIT. He was promoted to associate professor in 1884 and to full professor in 1891. He became head of what ultimately became known as the Department of Biology at MIT.

In 1888, Sedgwick began giving lectures in bacteriology to students in the civil engineering curriculum. His students became the spokesmen and practitioners who brought the principles of public health into the practice of engineering beginning in the 1890s and lasting well into the 20th century.

While he has been hailed as the first scientific American epidemiologist, Sedgwick was also described as not having a mathematical mind. He taught ideas and principles to his students. He instilled in his students the need to develop three basic behaviors: a vision of the subject in relation to the broader world, an honest method of working to seek the truth and an enthusiasm for service to the profession the public.

In 1902, he published the groundbreaking book Principles of Sanitary Science and the Public Health, which was a compilation of his lectures from the courses he taught at MIT and a distillation of his experience working in the field.

Sedgwick influenced many practitioners in the field of public health. Among the best known are Charles-Edward Amory Winslow, Samuel Cate Prescott, and William Lyman Underwood. He played a key role in Prescott's choice to go into bacteriology as a career, and was instrumental in Prescott's selection in the canning research with Underwood in 1895 – 6 that would lead to the growth of food technology.

== Harvard-MIT School for Public Health Officers ==
Sedgwick’s courses at MIT and his influence on civil engineering students there can be considered the first instructions in the field of public health. However, he and two colleagues felt that a more formal academic structure was needed. In 1913, he joined with George C. Whipple and Milton J. Rosenau to establish the Harvard-MIT School for Public Health Officers. This was the first formal academic program designed to train public health professionals. The joint program lasted until 1922 when Harvard University decided to launch the Harvard School of Public Health.

== Lawrence Experiment Station ==
Beginning in 1888, Sedgwick was appointed as consulting biologist to the Massachusetts State Board of Health. He directed bacteriological research at the Lawrence Experiment Station and sent his brightest engineering students to work there—including George W. Fuller and Allen Hazen. Even though he was not known for his laboratory research studies, he was responsible, along with George W. Rafter in 1889, for developing the enumeration procedure and apparatus for examining microscopic organisms in surface water bodies. The Sedgwick-Rafter counting cell is still in use today.

The Lawrence Experiment Station annual reports highlighted Sedgwick’s role as an epidemiologist. “In epidemiology, Sedgwick played a more direct and personal role and he was, indeed, the first scientific American epidemiologist.” Sedgwick used the annual report covering the work done in 1891 as a vehicle to publish his epidemiological studies of typhoid fever. “In the Annual Report of the State Board of Health of Massachusetts for 1892, Sedgwick presented studies on typhoid fever epidemics at Lowell and Lawrence, at Springfield and at Bondsville, which were classics in the field and which make this one of the most outstanding volumes in the history of epidemiology.”

== Water quality and the Jersey City trials ==
At the end of the 19th century, the water supply for Jersey City, New Jersey was contaminated with sewage and the death toll from typhoid fever was high. In 1899, the city contracted with a private company for the construction of a new water supply on the Rockaway River, which included a dam, reservoir and 23-mile pipeline. The project was completed on May 23, 1904; however, no treatment was provided to the water supply, because the contract did not require it. The city, claiming that the contract provisions were not fulfilled, filed a lawsuit in the Chancery Court of New Jersey. Jersey City officials complained that the water served to the city was not "pure and wholesome." Sedgwick testified as an expert witness for the plaintiffs in both trials. In the first trial, he testified that the water that was supplied to the city was contaminated with bacteria from sewage discharges in the watershed above the reservoir.

In the second trial, Sedgwick disagreed strongly with the proposal by John L. Leal to treat the water from the reservoir with calcium hypochlorite, which was called chloride of lime at that time. Instead, he believed that the construction of sewers in the watershed and a sewage disposal plant would be the preferable course of action. He also testified that chlorination did not remove organic matter, particulates and other filth, which could weaken the vital resistance of water consumers. However, the chlorination system was found to be safe, effective and reliable by the Special Master, William J. Magie, and was judged capable of supplying Jersey City with water that was "pure and wholesome."

== Personal life ==
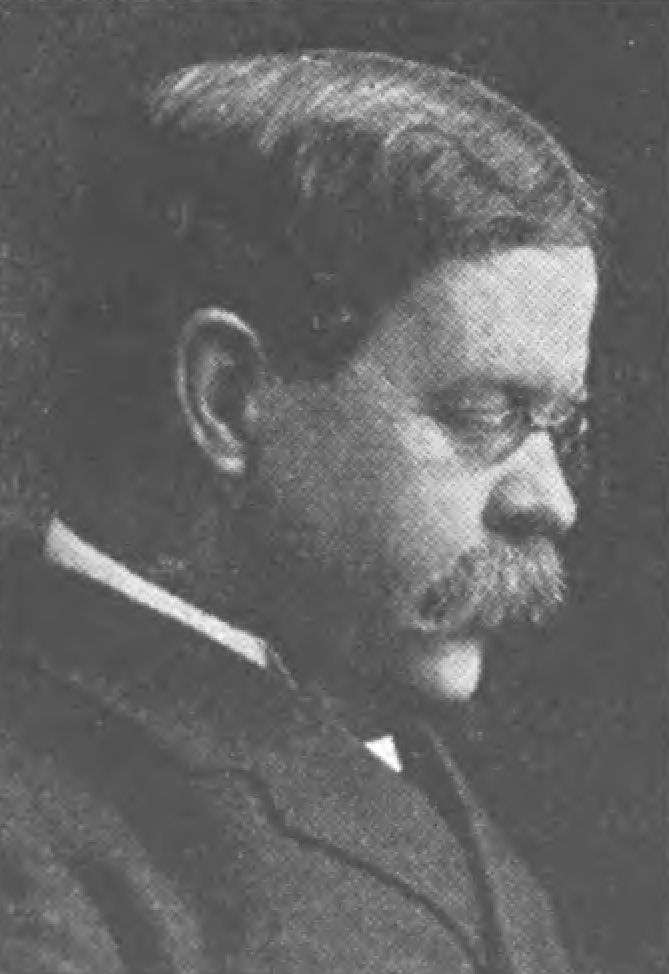
Sedgwick in his later years, c. 1916

Sedgwick lived his entire life in New England. He married Mary Katrine Rice of New Haven, Connecticut, on December 29, 1881. They had no children.

Sedgwick was a supporter of many causes that furthered the betterment of the public, and he volunteered his time for numerous charitable institutions, including his position of curator of the Lowell Institute beginning in 1897. However, he opposed women’s suffrage and anything that smacked of equality of the sexes. In a long article in The New York Times, Sedgwick stated his views plainly. He believed that women’s suffrage and feminism "... would mean a degeneration and degradation of human fibre which would turn back the hands of time a thousand years."

== Publications ==
Sedgwick was a prolific writer who published several hundred papers and other writings. His two most influential books were Principles of Sanitary Science and the Public Health and A Short History of Science. In the book A Pioneer of Public Health the authors include a complete list of Sedgwick's publications.

== Professional associations and assignments ==
He joined the New England Water Works Association in 1890 and was elected president of that organization in 1905. In 1902, he joined the American Public Health Association and became its president in 1915. He helped found the Society of American Bacteriologists (now American Society for Microbiology) and was chosen as president in 1900. He was also president of the American Society of Naturalists in 1900.

Sedgwick became a member of the Advisory Committee of the U.S. Public Health Service in 1902 and was involved in the adoption of the first national standards on drinking water quality—elimination of the common cup in 1912 and bacteriological standards for interstate carriers in 1914. After World War I, he was commissioned as Assistant Surgeon General in the reserves of the U.S. Public Health Service. Also, in 1914, Sedgwick was appointed a member of the Massachusetts Public Health Council, which was a component of the State Department of Public Health. He served on the Committee on Sanitary Engineering and he was Chairman of the Committee on Food and Drugs.

== Honors and awards ==
In 1904, he was made an honorary member of the New England Water Works Association. He was elected as a Fellow of the American Academy of Arts and Sciences in 1901 and became vice president of that organization in 1905. In 1906, sixty of his former students gathered to honor Sedgwick at a dinner and symposium in Boston, MA. He was elected to the American Philosophical Society in 1911. A middle school has been named in his honor in West Hartford, CT.

In 1909, Yale University conferred upon him the honorary degree of Sc.D. and the University of Cincinnati gave him an honorary LL.D. in 1920.

In 1922 Massachusetts Institute of Technology (MIT) established the Sedgwick Memorial Lecture in his honor. The inaugural lecture, entitled The Physical Basis of Life, was given by Edmund Beecher Wilson on December 29, 1922.

The American Public Health Association established the Sedgwick Memorial Medal in 1929 in his honor, for distinguished service and advancement of public health knowledge and practice. It is considered the APHA's highest honor.

== Selected publications ==
- Sedgwick, William T. (1890). “The Data of Filtration: I. Some Recent Experiments on the Removal of Bacteria from Drinking Water by Continuous Filtration Through Sand.” In Technology Quarterly, Boston: Massachusetts Institute of Technology, 69-75.
- Sedgwick, William T. (1891). “Typhoid Fever in Its Relation to Water Supplies.” In State Board of Health of Massachusetts, Twenty-Second Annual Report. Boston:State of Massachusetts, 525-43.
- Sedgwick, William T. (1892). “The Purification of Drinking Water by Sand Filtration: Its Theory, Practice, and Results; with Special Reference to American Needs and European Experience.” Journal New England Water Works Association 7:2 (December 1892): 103-30.
- Sedgwick, William T. (1893). “On Recent Epidemics of Typhoid Fever in the Cities of Lowell and Lawrence Due to Infected Water Supply: With Observations on Typhoid Fever in Other Cities and Towns of the Merrimack Valley, Especially Newburyport.” In State Board of Health of Massachusetts, Twenty-Fourth Annual Report. Boston: Commonwealth of Massachusetts, 667-704.
- Sedgwick, William T. (1902). Principles of Sanitary Science and the Public Health: With Special Reference to the Causation and Prevention of Infectious Diseases. New York: McMillan.
- Sedgwick, William T. and J. Scott MacNutt. (1910). “On the Mills-Reincke Phenomenon and Hazen’s Theorem Concerning the Decrease in Mortality from Diseases Other Than Typhoid Fever Following the Purification of Public Water-Supplies.” Journal of Infectious Diseases. 7:4 (August 24, 1910): 489-564.
