= American and Canadian Water Landmark =

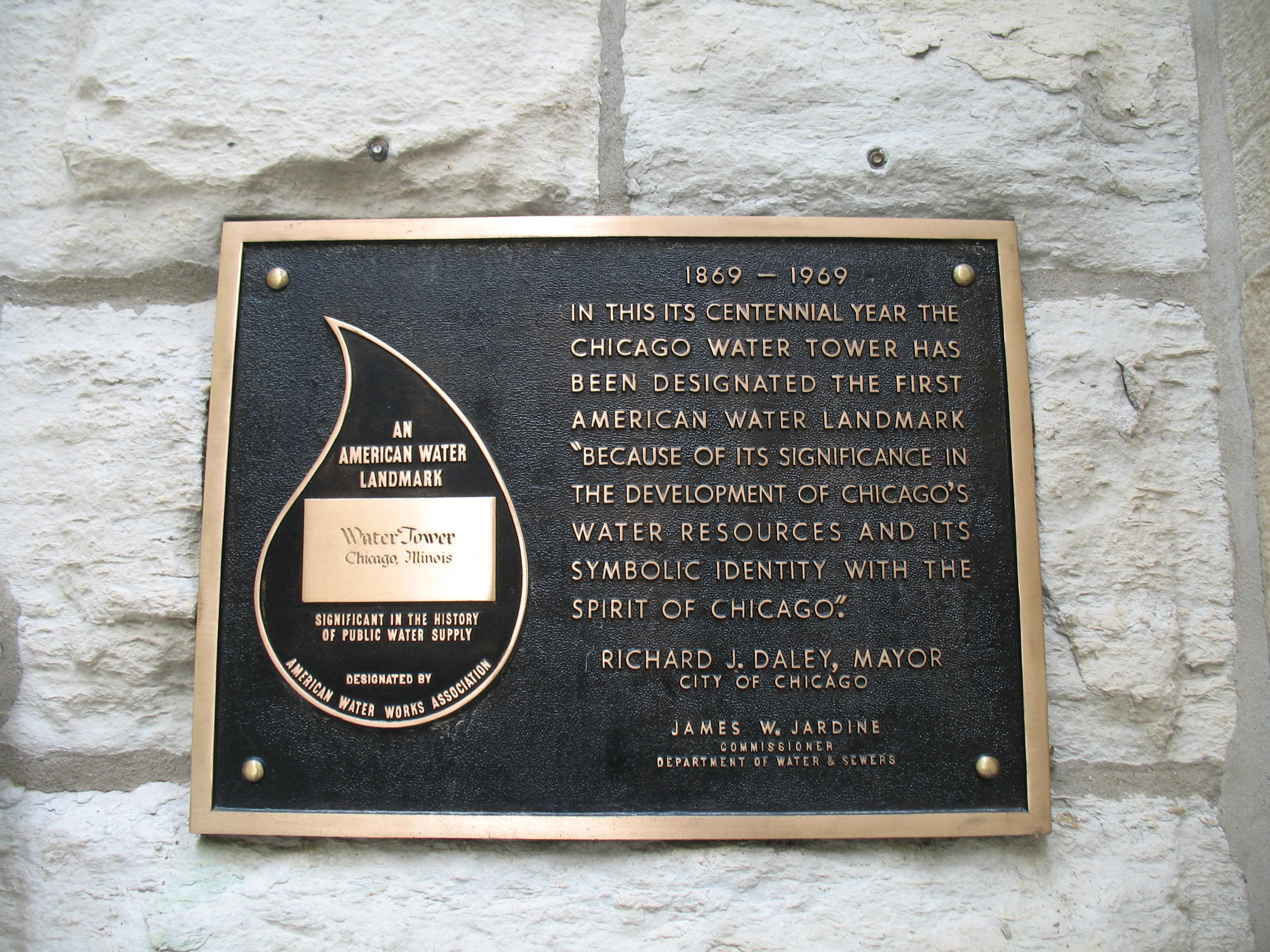
Dedication plaque of the Chicago Water Tower, the first American Water Landmark, designated in 1969

The American Water Works Association has designated American Water Landmarks and Canadian Water Landmarks since 1969, commemorating the history of water infrastructure. Nominations are made by the AWWA's regional chapters.

American and Canadian Water Landmarks include a variety of structures associated with water supply, including water towers, aqueducts, water treatment plants, and pumping stations. To be eligible, a structure must be 50 years old, and must have a "direct and significant relationship with water supply, treatment, distribution, or technological development." Structures do not necessarily have to be in service for their original purpose, although they must be well-maintained.

As of 2025, there are 249 designated Water Landmarks, including 224 American Water Landmarks and 25 Canadian Water Landmarks. Sites are located in 44 U.S. states, Puerto Rico, Washington, D.C., and 11 Canadian provinces and territories. Additionally, sites in Mexico are eligible for nomination.

== List ==
The following is the list of structures given the American Water Landmark designation:

Year	Landmark Name and Location	Image	Locale	State / Province
2025	Pulgas Water Temple 37.4833°N 122.317°W		San Mateo County	California
2025	Lake DeForest 41.1558°N 73.9584°W		Clarkstown	New York
2024	Glades Road Water Treatment Plant 26.3675069°N 80.109654°W		Boca Raton	Florida
2024	City of Fort Lauderdale NW 2nd Avenue Water Tower 26.1308282°N 80.1461656°W		Fort Lauderdale	Florida
2023	Guelph Waterworks Engine House and Pumping Station 43.54438°N 80.23099°W		Guelph	Ontario
2023	Hamilton’s First Waterworks 43.256236°N 79.770697°W		Hamilton	Ontario
2023	Hialeah Water Treatment Plant 25.8283828°N 80.2861017°W		Hialeah	Florida
2023	Kermit H. Lewin Seawater Desalination Water Treatment Plant 24.5600764°N 81.7341828°W		Stock Island	Florida
2023	Englewood Water District Lime Softening Plant		Englewood	Florida
2023	University of Central Florida – Elevated Water Storage Tower		Orlando	Florida
2022	City of Saskatoon Water Treatment Plant		Saskatoon	Saskatchewan
2022	Florissant Tank		Florissant	Missouri
2022	Réservoir McTavish 45.505529°N 73.578777°W		Montreal	Quebec
2021	Jackson Water Plant Tower		Jackson	Missouri
2020	City of Troy Standpipe		Troy	Alabama
2020	Dania Beach Water Treatment Plant		Dania Beach	Florida
2020	Myakkahatchee Creek Water Treatment Plant			Florida
2020	Mt. Airy Tanks		Mount Airy, Cincinnati	Ohio
2019	Antigua Acueducto de Rio Piedras 18.3892°N 66.0589°W		San Juan	Puerto Rico
2019	Linnwood Water Treatment Plant		Milwaukee	Wisconsin
2019	Delaware Aqueduct			New York
2018	Altoona Reservoir System 40.49169012°N 78.46125877°W		Altoona	Pennsylvania
2018	City of Ann Arbor Water Treatment Plant		Ann Arbor	Michigan
2018	Manatee County Dam		Bradenton	Florida
2018	Bay County Water Treatment Plant		Panama City	Florida
2017	Sheahan Pumping Station		Memphis	Tennessee
2017	Court Street Pumping Station		Montgomery	Alabama
2017	The Old Well - Water Well #3		Bristow	Oklahoma
2017	Destin Water Users Tower 1		Destin	Florida
2017	City of Dunedin Well 1		Dunedin	Florida
2016	High Point City Lake Dam aka Arnold J. Koonce Jr., City Lake Dam		Jamestown	North Carolina
2015	John F. Dye Water Conditioning Plant 42.7319257°N 84.5466721°W		Lansing	Michigan
2014	Pedlar River Dam and Gravity Pipeline		Lynchburg	Virginia
2014	R. C. Harris Water Treatment Plant 43.6732°N 79.2788°W		Toronto	Ontario
2014	Market Street Pump Station		San Antonio	Texas
2014	North Holly Water Treatment Plant		Fort Worth	Texas
2013	Butts Hill Small Water Storage Tank		Portsmouth	Rhode Island
2013	Old Pump House		Parry Sound	Ontario
2013	Riverside Water Treatment Plant		Waco	Texas
2013	Waterworks Museum 42.331691°N 71.155647°W		Chestnut Hill	Massachusetts
2009	Hoover Dam 36.0158°N 114.7378°W		Boulder City	Nevada
2009	Payson Park Reservoir & Gatehouse		Cambridge	Massachusetts
2007	Caruthersville Water Tower 36.19°N 89.66°W		Caruthersville	Missouri
2006	City of Riverside Upper Canal		Riverside	California
2006	Marston Water Tower 42.027°N 93.651°W		Ames	Iowa
2005	Crystal Spring Steam Pumping Station 37.25°N 79.94°W		Roanoke	Virginia
2005	Mount Clemens Water Filtration Plant		Mount Clemens	Michigan
2004	Main Office-San Jose Water Co.		San Jose	California
2003	Sunset Heights Pumping Station		El Paso	Texas
2003	Fort Revere Water Tower 42.3040891°N 70.9049621°W		Hull	Massachusetts
2003	Gainer Dam 41.7536°N 71.5839°W		Scituate	Rhode Island
2002	Alvarado Water Treatment Plant		La Mesa	California
2001	Spring Road Waterworks Bldg.		Huntington	New York
2001	North Pumping Station 41.69°N 86.25°W		South Bend	Indiana
2000	Iowa Institute of Hydraulic Research Hydraulics Lab		Iowa City	Iowa
2000	Brooks Catsup Bottle Water Tower 38.663°N 89.982°W		Collinsville	Illinois
2000	Cedartown Water Plant 34.0144°N 85.2585°W		Cedartown	Georgia
1999	Industrial & Domestic Water Treatment Plant		Savannah	Georgia
1999	Col. Francis G. Ward Complex		Buffalo	New York
1999	Sunrise Reservoir		Portsmouth	Ohio
1998	Grants Pass Water Filtration Plant		Grants Pass	Oregon
1997	Marine Dam		Waimea	Hawaii
1997	Old Holly Pump Station		Rochester	New York
1996	Salisbury Water Tank		West Lafayette	Indiana
1996	Sault Ste. Marie Water Storage Tank		Sault Ste. Marie	Michigan
1996	City of Chester Cistern		Chester	South Carolina
1995	Upriver Well #1		Spokane	Washington
1995	Volunteer Park Standpipe 47.629067°N 122.3145459°W		Seattle	Washington
1995	Beretania Pumping Station		Honolulu	Hawaii
1995	Jersey City Dam and Gatehouses		Jersey City	New Jersey
1994	Grosse Pointe Farms Water Treatment Plant		Grosse Pointe Farms	Michigan
1994	Halawa Shaft		Oahu	Hawaii
1994	1926 Pumping Station		West Palm Beach	Florida
1994	Fort Thomas Treatment Plant		Fort Thomas	Kentucky
1994	Albany Water Treatment Plant		Albany	Oregon
1993	North Main Tank Bldg.		Independence	Missouri
1993	Delphos Standpipe		Delphos	Ohio
1993	Brighton Dam			Maryland
1993	Mark B. Whitaker Water Treatment Plant		Knoxville	Tennessee
1993	Jordan & Salt Lake Canal		Salt Lake County	Utah
1993	River Pumping Station		Cincinnati	Ohio
1992	Fulbright Water Treatment Plant		Springfield	Missouri
1992	The Big Dam		Loveland	Colorado
1992	O'Shaugnhnessy Dam 40.154°N 83.126°W		Columbus	Ohio
1992	Albany Water Works		Albany	Georgia
1992	Marine City Water Works		Marine City	Michigan
1991	Illinois-American Water Co. Main Station		Cairo	Illinois
1991	Baldwin Filtration Plant		Cleveland	Ohio
1991	Alpena Water Treatment Plant		Alpena	Michigan
1991	Lake Superior Waterworks Swedetown Standpipe		Calumet	Michigan
1991	Mill Creek Water Treatment Plant		Dalton	Georgia
1991	White Rock Pump Station		Dallas	Texas
1991	Macon Water Treatment Plant		Macon	Georgia
1991	Colorado River Aqueduct		Southern California	California
1991	Glenmore Water Treatment Plant		Calgary	Alberta
1990	Newport Pumping Station		Newport	Kentucky
1990	Lafayette Street Standpipe		Baton Rouge	Louisiana
1990	Kingsport Water Filtration Plant		Kingsport	Tennessee
1990	Holston River Water Pumping Station		Kingsport	Tennessee
1990	Vest Station		Charlotte	North Carolina
1989	Ashland Water Treatment Plant		Ashland	Nebraska
1989	Jefferson Water & Electric Commission Wellhouse #2		Jefferson	Wisconsin
1989	High Service Pumping Station Virginia-American Water Company		Hopewell	Virginia
1989	Columbus Water Treatment Plant		Columbus	Georgia
1989	Boniface Water Tower		Village of Scarsdale	New York
1989	Citico Pump Station		Chattanooga	Tennessee
1989	Indiana-American Water Company Seymour District's Low Service Hydraulic Turbine Pumping Facility		Seymour	Indiana
1989	Madison County Stand Pipe Water Tank		Madison	Florida
1988	Cobbs Hill Reservoir		Rochester	New York
1988	Alexandria District Reservoir		Alexandria	Virginia
1988	MinneLusa Pumping Station		Omaha	Nebraska
1988	J.H. Fewell Water Treatment Plant		Jackson	Mississippi
1988	Alexandria District Operations Center		Alexandria	Virginia
1988	Capitol City Water Tower		Jefferson City	Missouri
1988	Snow Pumping Station		Nashua	New Hampshire
1988	Illinois-American Water Co. Main Station		Alton	Illinois
1988	Water Works Park Treatment Plant		Detroit	Michigan
1988	North Easton Water Works Pumping Plant		North Easton	Massachusetts
1987	R.B Simms Filtration Plant & Dam		Spartanburg	South Carolina
1987	Jacksonville Water Works Park		Jacksonville	Florida
1987	Omohundro Water Treatment Plant		Nashville	Tennessee
1987	Canal Winchester Water Treatment Plant		Canal Winchester	Ohio
1987	Illinois-American Water Company's Main Station		East St. Louis	Illinois
1987	Sacramento River Water Treatment Plant		Sacramento	California
1987	Indian Hill Water Tower		Indian Hill	Ohio
1987	Oak Street Standpipe		Huntington	Indiana
1986	30th Street Pump Station		Galveston	Texas
1986	Frankfort Electric & Water Plant's Reservoir		Frankfort	Kentucky
1986	Remington Water Tower		Remington	Indiana
1986	Stoughton Pump Station		Stoughton	Massachusetts
1986	24th Street Pump Station		Huntington	West Virginia
1986	North Street Pumping Station		Waukesha	Wisconsin
1986	Blendville Pumping Station		Joplin	Missouri
1985	Winnipeg Aqueduct		Winnipeg	Manitoba
1985	Robert E. Green Auditorium		Vincennes	Indiana
1985	Monroe Water Works Filtration Plant		Monroe	Michigan
1985	No. 1 Water Treatment Complex		Hattiesburg	Mississippi
1985	Ada Treatment Plant		Bluefield	West Virginia
1985	Snow & Gaskill Pump House		St. Joseph	Missouri
1985	Three Rivers Filtration Plant		Fort Wayne	Indiana
1985	Bluffton Water Works Washington Street Station		Bluffton	Indiana
1985	Barton Dam & Impoundment		Ann Arbor	Michigan
1985	Walnut Street Standpipe		Wabash	Indiana
1985	Boulware Springs Waterworks		Gainesville	Florida
1985	Little Quitticas Pump Station		New Bedford	Massachusetts
1985	Two Mile Dam & Reservoir		Santa Fe	New Mexico
1984	Bartow Water Tank		Bartow	Florida
1984	McMillan Water Treatment Plant		Washington	District of Columbia
1984	Bird's Mill Pumping Station		Bracebridge	Ontario
1984	City of Fredericton Water Treatment Plant		Fredericton	New Brunswick
1984	George's Pond Reservoir			Newfoundland
1984	Dam & Reservoir #4		Lexington	Kentucky
1984	Third Street Pump Station		Stillwater	Minnesota
1983	Petrolia Water Works		Brights Grove	Ontario
1983	Water St. Pumphouse & Dam		Petersborough	Ontario
1983	Branch Street Pump Station		Pawtucket	Rhode Island
1983	Highfield Pump Station		Moncton	New Brunswick
1983	Robbie Street Reservoir		Halifax	Nova Scotia
1983	Hillsborough River Water Treatment Plant		Tampa	Florida
1983	Island Filtration Plant		Toronto	Ontario
1983	Long Island Water Corp. Main Plant #5		Hewlett	New York
1982	Lily Lake Reservoir		Saint John	New Brunswick
1982	Danville Standpipe		Danville	Indiana
1982	St. Marys Water Tower		St. Marys	Ontario
1982	McNeil Street Pumping Station		Shreveport	Louisiana
1982	The Pumphouse		Indianapolis	Indiana
1982	Havana Water Tower; 40°18′2″N 90°3′31″W		Havana	Illinois
1981	Rosehill Reservoir		Toronto	Ontario
1981	Highland Park Tower; 44°55′3.4″N 93°10′0″W		St. Paul	Minnesota
1981	Burlington City Reservoir & Pump House		Burlington	Vermont
1981	Plaza Well		St. Augustine	Florida
1981	Walnut Hill Reservoir		Omaha	Nebraska
1981	Echo Bridge; 42°18′53.42″N 71°13′36.84″W		Newton	Massachusetts
1981	Turtle Creek Pump Station		Dallas	Texas
1981	Fleet Street Pumping Station		Ottawa	Ontario
1981	John Street Pumping Station		Toronto	Ontario
1981	Smithsburg Reservoir		Washington County	Maryland
1981	Kalihi Pumping Station		Honolulu	Hawaii
1981	Main Station Pump House #1		Peoria	Illinois
1981	Lewiston Water Treatment Plant		Lewiston	Idaho
1981	Mountain Dell Dam		Salt Lake City	Utah
1981	Great Sandy Bottom Pump Station		Pembroke	Massachusetts
1981	Lithia Water Fountain		Ashland	Oregon
1981	City of Port Arthur Water Treatment Plant		Port Arthur	Texas
1980	Mission Creek Dam & Reservoir		Santa Barbara	California
1980	Lake Whitney Dam		Hamden	Connecticut
1980	No. 2 Water Pumping Station		Calgary	Alberta
1980	Monroe Filtration Plant		Grand Rapids	Michigan
1980	Chain of Rocks Plant-Intakes 1 & 2		St. Louis	Missouri
1980	Flint Lake Water Treatment Plant		Valparaiso	Indiana
1980	Bangor Standpipe on Thomas Hill		Bangor	Maine
1979	Roger Williams Spring		Providence	Rhode Island
1979	Ella Street Pumping Station		Tiffin	Ohio
1979	No. 1 Pumping Station		Louisville	Kentucky
1979	Tower Hill Water Tower		Lawrence	Massachusetts
1979	Kassler Water Treatment Plant		Denver	Colorado
1979	Coquitlam Lake Intake Tower		Vancouver	British Columbia
1978	Sunset Hill Water Tower		Ossining	New York
1978	Augusta Water Works Pumping Station		Augusta	Georgia
1978	Manchester Low Service Pumping Station		Manchester	New Hampshire
1978	Grand Avenue Water Tower; 38°40′14.8″N 90°12′33.9″W		St. Louis	Missouri
1977	Woodland Reservoir		Syracuse	New York
1977	Malpeque Road Water Pump Station		Charlottetown	Prince Edward Island
1977	Fairmount Water Works; 39°57′56″N 75°10′51″W		Philadelphia	Pennsylvania
1977	The Acequias of San Antonio		San Antonio	Texas
1977	Huntsville Big Spring		Huntsville	Alabama
1977	Moores Bridges Filter Bldg.		Norfolk	Virginia
1977	Cahaba Pumping Station		Birmingham	Alabama
1977	Bissell Street Water Tower; 38°40′13″N 90°12′21″W		St. Louis	Missouri
1977	Grassy Sprain Reservoir & Tuckahoe Road Pump Station		Yonkers	New York
1976	Virginia & Gold Hill Water Co. Marlette Lake Water System		Virginia City	Nevada
1976	Walter E. Peele Dixie Water Plant		Fort Lauderdale	Florida
1976	Coldwater Spring		Anniston	Alabama
1976	Tomhannock Reservoir & Dam		Troy	New York
1976	Kalamazoo Water Tower; 42°16′45″N 85°36′16″W		Kalamazoo	Michigan
1976	Old Mission San Buenaventura Filtration Building		Ventura	California
1976	Big Bear Lake Dams		San Bernardino	California
1976	Compton Hill Tower		St. Louis	Missouri
1976	Ashokan Reservoir		Ulster County	New York
1976	No. 1 Pumping Station		Veradale	Washington
1975	Bremen Water Tower		Bremen	Indiana
1975	Slow Sand Filter Beds		Ilion	New York
1975	Waldo Water Tower		Kansas City	Missouri
1974	Georgetown Reservoir Castle Gatehouse		Washington	District of Columbia
1974	Jones Beach State Park Water Tower		Jones Beach	New York
1974	Chabot Dam and Lake Chabot		San Leandro	California
1974	Ypsilanti Water Tower		Ypsilanti	Michigan
1973	Water Supply & Sewerage Systems		Dawson	Yukon Territory
1973	Kingston Water Dept. Filter Plant		Kingston	New York
1973	The Big Well		Greensburg	Kansas
1973	Lawson Tower		Scituate	Massachusetts
1972	Big Hole Pump Station Pump No. 2		Butte	Montana
1972	Fresno Water Tower		Fresno	California
1972	Cabin John Bridge		Cabin John	Maryland
1972	Druid Lake Dam		Baltimore	Maryland
1971	Bethlehem 1769 Waterworks		Bethlehem	Pennsylvania
1971	Eighth Avenue South Reservoir		Nashville	Tennessee
1971	Indiana Central Canal		Indianapolis	Indiana
1971	Eden Park Water Tower		Cincinnati	Ohio
1971	Filtration Plant		Elmira	New York
1970	Aqueduct Cascades		Los Angeles	California
1970	Louisville Water Tower		Louisville	Kentucky
1970	Gary-Hobart Water Tower		Gary	Indiana
1970	Riverside Water Tower		Riverside	Illinois
1969	Chicago Water Tower		Chicago	Illinois
1969	North Point Water Tower		Milwaukee	Wisconsin
1969	Theodore Roosevelt Dam		Phoenix	Arizona
1969	Old Mission Dam and Flume		San Diego	California
1969	High Bridge Water Tower		New York	New York

== See also ==
- Water supply infrastructure on the National Register of Historic Places - U.S. sites
