= Elmira Water Filtration Plant =

Water filtration plant in Elmira, New York, US

Coordinates: 42°6′0″N 76°50′8″W

The Elmira Water Filtration Plant is a drinking water treatment facility in Elmira, New York and a component of the Elmira Water Board's water supply system. The original filtration plant, which was located on Reservoir Street and completed in 1897 following an outbreak of typhoid fever, was one of the oldest functioning rapid sand filtration plants in the United States and had been designated as an American Water Landmark and a historic civil engineering landmark. It filtered surface water obtained from the Chemung River and a reservoir on Hoffman Creek—and also later ground water pumped from wells—for distribution into the Elmira Water Board's system of water mains. A new filtration plant located across Hoffman Creek opened in 1996 as a replacement for the old filter plant, which was subsequently demolished in 2009.

== History ==
=== Construction and opening ===
An outbreak of typhoid fever in Elmira, New York in 1896 led to calls for the Elmira Water Works Company to purify the city's existing water supply system. At that time, the majority of the city's water supply was drawn from the Chemung River, and it was believed that sewerage from Corning and other towns located upstream was primarily responsible for the outbreak of the disease. The city's water had initially been supplied by a reservoir on Hoffman Creek that had been created by a dam constructed in 1870 and 1871; water had been pumped from the Chemung River since the early 1880s when the water supplied by the reservoir became inadequate to meet all of the city's demand.

In May 1896, the Elmira Water Works Company decided to install a water filtration plant. Representatives of mechanical filtration systems visited the site and John M. Diven, secretary of the Elmira Water Works Company, traveled to Niagara Falls to inspect the filtration plant there that had opened the month before and contained nine Jewell water filters. Bids were requested for the construction of a new filter plant with a capacity of 6 million US gallons (23,000 m^{3}) per day.

The contract for the filter plant was awarded to the Morrison-Jewell Filtration Company and construction began in October 1896. The new facility was built on the north side of the distribution reservoir that had been constructed in the 1860s with a capacity of 3.5 million US gallons (13,000 m^{3}); this reservoir was referred to as the "low service reservoir" after 1911 when another distribution reservoir was constructed nearby at a higher elevation. The filter plant and distribution reservoir were located approximately two miles (3.2 km) north of the pumping station that drew water from the Chemung River and about one mile (1.6 km) south of the reservoir on Hoffman Creek. A total of 18 Jewell water filters were installed beginning in December 1896 and the new filtration plant, completed at a cost of $100,000, was placed into operation in January 1897.

An injunction served against the Morrison-Jewell Filtration Company in February 1897 prevented the use of coagulants, claiming that the plant infringed on patents held by the New York Filter Company. In June 1897, a court order brought experts from both companies to Elmira for a week-long test of the plant, with the Morrison-Jewell Filtration Company attempting to show that the effects of coagulants were made in settling basins instead of the filters. The litigation ended in February 1898 as a result of a settlement between the companies and the filter plant was placed into full service in March 1898.

=== Design and operation ===
Elmira Filtration Plant Complex
1 High Service Reservoir
2 Coagulation Basin
3 New Filtration Plant
4 Old Filtration Plant (demolished)
5 Low Service Reservoir (demolished)

In 1904, the rated capacity of the plant was increased to 7 million US gallons (26,000 m^{3}) per day with the addition of three Jewell water filters for a total of 21 filters. Each filter tank had an outside diameter of 13.5 feet (4.1 m) and was 15 feet (4.6 m) tall. Water chlorination was used at the plant beginning in 1909, a year after it was first used in the United States for disinfection at Boonton, New Jersey. In 1911, a second distributing reservoir with a capacity of 5 million US gallons (19,000 m^{3}) was constructed on the hill on the west side of Hoffman Creek at an elevation 101 feet (31 m) higher than the original distributing reservoir. This reservoir, which was referred to as the "high service reservoir", provided enough pressure to supply water to higher areas of the water supply system's expanded distribution area.

The water filtration process used at the plant involved a series of steps. Aluminum sulfate and chlorine were first added to the untreated water to act as a coagulant and a disinfectant, respectively. This water was then sent to subsidence basins before passing through the rapid sand filters. The filtered water was finally discharged into the low service reservoir and pumped into the high service reservoir.

In 1913, the Elmira Water Board was established as a public utility, which took control of the filter plant and other parts of the city's water supply system on May 1, 1915 after an agreement was reached to purchase the property of the Elmira Water, Light, & Railroad Company (which had consolidated the Elmira Water Works Company and other public utilities in 1904).

Aerators were added to the high service reservoir in 1930. A separate coagulation facility was added in 1938, which is located downhill from the high service reservoir, and is used to add the aluminum sulfate and chlorine as part of the water treatment process. Well water was first added to Elmira's water supply system in 1960 with the drilling of a well at Sullivan Street, which was followed by the drilling of an additional well in 1962 at Kentucky Avenue to support a new food processing plant. The Sullivan Street and Kentucky Avenue wells were later shut down after they became contaminated with trichloroethylene pollution and were replaced by new wells drilled on Foster Island.

The original filtration plant on Reservoir Street received the American Water Works Association's American Water Landmark award in 1971, recognizing the facility as one of the oldest rapid sand filtration plants in the United States still in operation. It was also designated as a New York historic civil engineering landmark by the American Society of Civil Engineers in 1983.

=== New filtration plant ===
In the early 1990s, a study by C&S Engineers recommended the replacement of the original filtration plant with a new facility containing modern equipment. Designs for a new filtration plant were initiated in 1992. Bids for construction of the new filter plant, which also included improvements to the coagulation basin and high service reservoir, were advertised by the Elmira Water Board in the spring of 1994.

Five firms submitted bids on the general contracting for the project, which was awarded to the Garbade Construction Company in June 1994. Construction of the new water filtration building began that summer, which was located across Hoffman Creek and to the west of the original filtration building. The new facility was designed to process 17 million US gallons (64,000 m^{3}) of water a day, which was an increase of 5 million US gallons (19,000 m^{3}) per day compared to the old facility. The Elmira Water Board expressed a desire to preserve four of the existing filters and convert the old filter plant into a museum. The new water filtration plant opened in May 1996, replacing the old filter plant. The new facility cost $14.6 million to construct and was completed under budget.

The old filtration plant was demolished by the Elmira Water Board in 2009. At the time, the building was unoccupied and had been in poor structural condition. As part of its long-range planning, the Elmira Water Board considered closing its main office located on West Water Street and relocating it to the former site of the old filtration plant on Reservoir Street. This proposed move would have allowed for the consolidation of all of the water board's departments to a single area, reducing travel time by employees traveling between the filtration plant complex and the main office in downtown Elmira. It would also have provided customers with a drive-through window for payments and on-site parking. The proposed move was met with opposition from local residents, who were concerned about the additional traffic that the facility would bring to a residential area. The proposed relocation of the Elmira Water Board to Reservoir Street was again discussed in 2025 and prompted similar concerns from local residents.

== See also ==
- Water supply and sanitation in the United States
