= Havana Water Tower =

- U.S. National Register of Historic Places
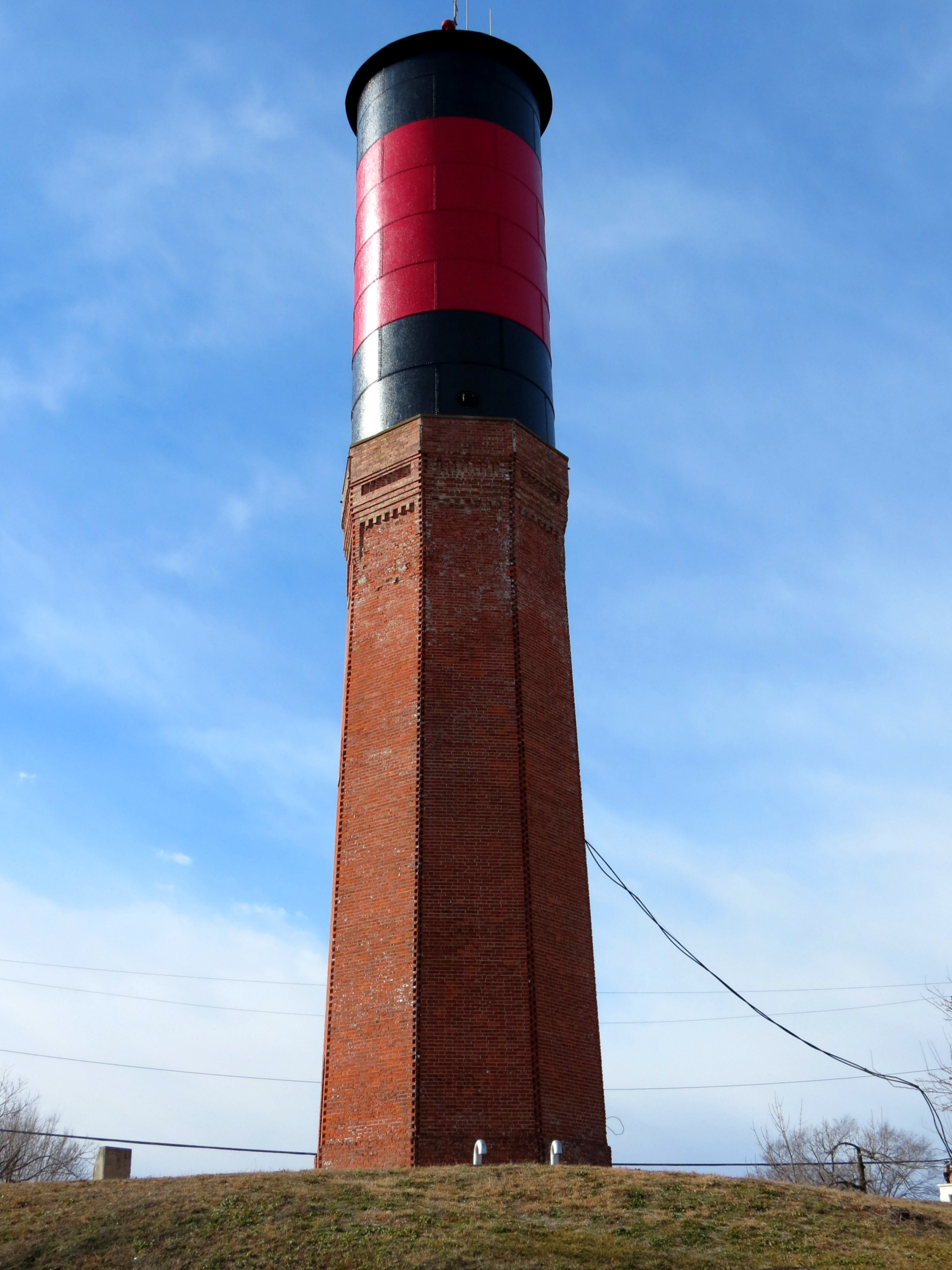
- Location: Jct. of Pearl and Main Sts., NE corner, Havana, Illinois
- Coordinates: 40°18′2″N 90°3′31″W
- Area: less than one acre
- Built: 1889
- Architect: Raider, F.W.; Jaeger, Guido
- NRHP reference No.: 93000325
- Added to NRHP: April 22, 1993

The Havana Water Tower is a historic water tower which stands in Havana, Illinois. Built in 1889 and designed by St. Louis architect F. William Raider, it holds 50,000 gallons and was the town's only water supply until 1962. It is the fourth-oldest water tower in Illinois.

== Architecture ==
F.W. Raider designed the structure in a lighthouse style.

The brick water tower is approximately 86 feet (26 m) tall on an octagonal base. The soft brick may have been manufactured locally. The 50,000 gallon sits on a platform at an elevation of 50 feet. The top of the tank was open until the 1950s, when a flat, silver top was added. The flat roof was later replaced with a conical style based on the original blueprints.

== History ==
It was designated an American Water Landmark by the American Water Works Association in 1982 and was listed on the National Register of Historic Places in 1993.

The tank was drained in 2012 due to worries about structural stability.

In 2021, Landmarks Illinois listed the water tower as one of the most endangered historic landmarks. The organization also awarded a $2,500 grant that was used to repair retaining walls, which were decorated with a mural by Green Valley artist Luke Kinzler.

== See also ==
- List of Towers
- American Water Landmark
