= John M. Diven =

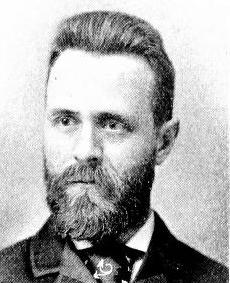
- Born: April 24, 1852; Elmira, New York
- Died: January 4, 1925 (aged 72); Troy, New York
- Occupations: Water utility superintendent and professional association leader
- Known for: Early leadership of the American Water Works Association
- Parent(s): Alexander S. Diven; Amanda Malvina Beer
- Awards: Honorary member (1924) and Water Industry Hall of Fame (1973) American Water Works Association.

John Malvina Diven (April 24, 1852 – January 4, 1925) was a New York and South Carolina superintendent of several water utilities and an important figure in the early history of the American Water Works Association. He was honored by AWWA for his dedicated service with election to honorary membership and selection as a member of Water Industry Hall of Fame.

== Early life and education ==
Diven was born on April 24, 1852, in the town of Elmira, New York, which is located on the central part of the southern state border with Pennsylvania. He was the son of Congressman Alexander S. Diven (1809–1896) and Amanda Malvina (Beer) Diven. His father was a lawyer and civic leader. His father served in the Civil War on the Union side and rose to the rank of general. In business, his father was a member of the board of directors of the Erie Railroad and was for a time the acting chief executive of the organization. General Diven was the principal stockholder of a company that owned the Elmira Water works. John M. Diven received no formal science or engineering training but devoted his career to the efficient management water utilities.

== Career ==
John M. Diven worked for the Elmira Water Works starting in 1872. He rose to the position of superintendent in 1886 and held that position until the winter of 1904-5. During his tenure at the water works, the Elmira Water Filtration Plant, one of the first mechanical filtration (or rapid sand filtration) plants was built. Diven was a member of the New York State Assembly (Chemung Co.) in 1893. His next position was as manager of the water system at Charleston, South Carolina. Diven improved the water service in that system and brought it up to modern standards. In 1912, Diven became manager of the municipal water works system of Troy, New York. After a five-year hiatus (1919-1924), which he spent in New York City, Diven returned to Troy to resume his utility leadership. He died a year later.

== Personal life ==
Diven lived and worked for most of his life in New York State. On November 6, 1878, he married Susan H. Hepburn of Elmira, New York. They had four children—three daughters and one son: Julia (1879-1881), Alice (1882-unknown), May (1885-1887) and John M. Diven Jr. (1890-unknown). He owned a farm near Watkins Glen, New York which he used as a source of income and for entertaining.

== Professional associations ==
Diven gave long and loyal service to the American Water Works Association. He was elected to membership in AWWA on April 16, 1884, which was only three years after the association was organized in St. Louis by William C. Stripe. As recorded during his presidential address in 1924, George Warren Fuller listed his service to the organization. “One who has not been an officer of this Association cannot possibly appreciate the benefits which have been derived by the organization from the activities of Mr. Diven. He was president in 1892; secretary and treasurer from 1902 to 1912; secretary and editor from 1913 to 1916; and secretary from 1917 to February 1, 1924. This period of unflagging service on his part was during one of limited resources for a struggling association.”

Along with Clemens Herschel, Diven was elected as an honorary member of the American Water Works Association in 1924. In 1973, he was inducted into the AWWA Water Industry Hall of Fame.

In 1925, AWWA established the John M. Diven Award. The award is given each year “to the member who has rendered the most outstanding service to the Association during the year.” Recipients of the Driven Award include George Warren Fuller, Abel Wolman, Malcolm Pirnie and Alvin Percy Black. On the opening night of the 1924 annual conference of AWWA, a testimonial dinner was given for Diven in the Hotel Astor Ballroom.

Even though Diven had not received formal engineering training, he was a member of the American Society of Civil Engineers. He earned his position in that organization through experience and self instruction.

== Limited list of publications ==
Diven published a number of papers in the proceedings and the Journal of the AWWA. But he was also known for his energetic participation in paper discussions which were captured by court stenographers and printed after the papers in the association publications. He had a strong opinion on the importance of filtration during the famous discussion of the paper by George C. Whipple entitled “Disinfection of Water.” His publications include:

- Diven, John M. (1907). “The Care of a Mechanical Filter Plant.” Proceedings of the American Water Works Association. New York:AWWA.
- Diven, John M. (1907). “How Can Politics be Eliminated from Municipal Water Works.” Proceedings of the American Water Works Association. New York:AWWA.
- Diven, John M. (1908). “Stripping Reservoir Lands.” Proceedings of the American Water Works Association. New York:AWWA.
- Diven, John M. (1910). “Conservation of Potable Water.” Proceedings of the American Water Works Association. New York:AWWA.
- Diven, John M. (1914). “Use and Benefits of Pressure Recording Gages.” Journal AWWA. 1:1 103-10.
- Mueller, Adolph, John M. Diven and John N. Chester. (1921). “The Standardization of Brass Goods for Water Works.” Journal AWWA. 8:1 48-54.

New York State Assembly
Preceded by Robert P. Bush	New York State Assembly; Chemung County; 1893	Succeeded by Robert P. Bush
