= Woodland Reservoir =

- Location within New York
- Location: Onondaga County, New York
- Coordinates: 43°01′38″N 76°10′36″W
- Type: Reservoir
- Basin countries: United States
- Built: 1890s
- Surface area: 14 acres (5.7 ha)
- Max. depth: 36 ft (11 m)
- Water volume: 121-million-US-gallon (460,000 m^{3})
- Surface elevation: 627 ft (191 m)

Woodland Reservoir is a 121-million-US-gallon (460,000 m^{3}) reservoir serving the city of Syracuse, New York. The reservoir was built in the 1890s as the receiving end of the new water supply for Syracuse coming by a 19 miles (31 km) pipeline from the Skaneateles Lake. It was designated an American Water Landmark in 1977.

== Description ==
Woodland Reservoir is a 121-million-US-gallon (460,000 m^{3}) reservoir. In 1935 it had a maximum depth of 36 feet (11 m) and 14 acres (5.7 ha) of surface area.

== History ==
The area occupied by Woodland Reservoir was initially a spot for picnickers known as Lilly's Grove or Cawan's Grove.

In the early and mid 19th-century, the city of Syracuse, New York, was supplied with water by the Syracuse Water Works company from sources including Onondaga Creek. It was relatively unclean and beginning by the middle of the century had proven to be of insufficient pressure to serve the city's growing populace. After the company's contract expired in 1885, efforts began to secure a different source of water for the city. The city government considered various lakes, including Cazenovia Lake, Oneida Lake, the Salmon River, and Skaneateles Lake. They eventually decided upon Skaneatles, a vote that was overwhelmingly endorsed in a vote by Syracusans.

After the rights to the water were acquired, the city began a project in the 1890s to build a 19 miles (31 km) pipeline that would carry water from the lake to Syracuse. Woodland Reservoir was constructed to hold water in Syracuse. While a local news article reported that the reservoir was constructed over "about four years" and opened in 1894, William Martin Beauchamp's 1908 history of Syracuse stated that the Woodland Reservoir was constructed from 1893 to 1895, specifying water from had entered the pipeline from Skaneatles on June 29, 1894, and that four days later it had reached the city. The Reservoir was built by crews who lived on site, predominantly consisting of Italian immigrants and African-Americans.

In 1910 a water tank was constructed on the site with a capacity of 1,250,000 US gallons (4,700,000 L; 1,040,000 imp gal) of water. Upon construction, it was the sole reservoir supplying water to Syracuse. By 1927, it had proved insufficient to meet the city's needs alone; if the lines carrying water from Skaneatles stopped working, it only had adequate capacity to supply the whole city for two days. A second reservoir, the Westcott Reservoir, was constructed, about 1 mile (1.6 km) north in the late 1920s and early 1930s. A project to reline the reservoir with gunite took place in 1932.

In the 1960s the water tank was known as a place where local youth would hang out. In 1977 the American Water Works Association named Woodland Reservoir an American Water Landmark, a plaque was erected at the site by 1979. In the 1990s Syracuse renovated the reservoir, adding a new fence around the water tank and replacing portions of it. A treatment plant on the site was built in 2000 and about a decade later, in 2012, work began on a plant that would treat water with ultraviolet light.

== See also ==
- List of reservoirs and dams in New York
- Westcott Reservoir
