= Crystal Spring Steam Pumping Station =

- U.S. National Register of Historic Places
- Virginia Landmarks Register
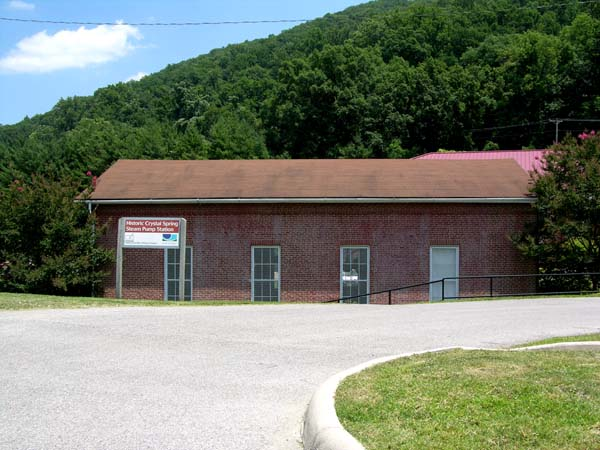
- Crystal Spring Steam Pumping Station, June 2010

- Location within Virginia Location within the United States
- Location: 2016 Lake St., SE, Roanoke, Virginia
- Coordinates: 37°14′59″N 79°56′40″W
- Area: less than one acre
- Built: 1905
- Built by: Snow Stream Pump Co. (pump)
- NRHP reference No.: 80004220
- VLR No.: 128-0039

Significant dates
- Added to NRHP: May 23, 1980
- Designated VLR: December 28, 1979

The Crystal Spring Steam Pumping Station is a historic pumping station located at Roanoke, Virginia, in the United States. It was built in 1905, and is a one-story building constructed in common-bond brick. The building houses a Corliss-type pump made by the Snow Steam Pump Company in Buffalo, New York. At its peak, the pump provided 5,000,000 US gallons (19,000 m^{3}) of water daily. It was in operation from 1905 to 1957, and was an important source of fresh water in Roanoke's early history.

The pump and building underwent a renovation in 1976, and the property was listed on the National Register of Historic Places in 1980. As of 2023 the building was open for tours during summer weekends.

== History ==
The pumping station makes use of Crystal Spring, a perennial spring emerging from the foot of Mill Mountain in the City of Roanoke. The spring was used by Native Americans prior to European settlement, after which the land surrounding the spring was granted in a 1747 patent to Mark Evans, an early settler. Evans's son Daniel built a gristmill on the spring, thereby giving Mill Mountain its name. In the mid-1750s, (Note: Various sources have the date of Washington's time in the valley as 1752, 1754, and 1756) George Washington passed through the area and noted in his journal a three-shilling payment, likely for lodging, to the "Widow Evans" (presumably Roda Evans, Daniel's wife). In 1782, the Evans family sold the mill and surrounding land, including the spring, to William McClanahan.

During the 1800s, the nearest settlement to the spring was the small town of Big Lick. In 1881, boosters from that town succeeded in securing it as the junction and later headquarters of the Shenandoah Valley Railroad and the Norfolk and Western Railway. The presence of the nearby spring was a significant reason for the railways' choice of the area, and they quickly acquired an option on both it and the mill. Water from the spring was fed by gravity north to the railroads, then pumped into a storage tank southeast of the town.

The coming of the railroad turned the small Big Lick into an immediate boomtown, and by 1884, its population had passed 5,000 and it was granted a city charter. Renamed Roanoke, the city in its early days relied heavily on the spring to provide water for its growing citizenry and industry. The spring and its accompanying reservoir were landscaped by the Roanoke Gas and Water Company, and were a popular leisure spot for the city's residents. The spring was later purchased by a private land improvement company that had Holly steam pumps installed, but by 1905, Roanoke's population had grown to a point that improved facilities were necessary, and the Crystal Spring Steam Pumping Station was constructed to replace the earlier pump.

The pump was purchased from the Buffalo, New York–based Snow Steam Pump Company (which would later be the Worthington Corporation). The pump used Corliss steam engine technology, and weighed 200 short tons (180 t) with an 11-short-ton (10 t) flywheel measuring 13 feet (4 m) across. Two steam chambers and piston rod cylinders completed the machinery. The pump was transported by train to Roanoke and carted in pieces to Crystal Spring. Following its assembly on-site, the brick building to house it was constructed around the device. A smaller building next door housed the boilers necessary to generate the pump's steam.

The new pump provided up to five million US gallons (19 ML) of water each day, and was a contributor to the young city's rapid growth. The city, which in 1915 had annexed the land surrounding Crystal Spring, purchased the spring and pumphouse in 1938. In 1942, in the midst of World War II, the city installed air raid sirens on the pump station's exterior.

The pump remained in use until 1957, when the decision was made to replace the steam-powered pump with one located nearby run by electricity. The reservoir was paved over in 1974 and tennis courts installed atop the concrete. The 1905 facility fell into disrepair, until a group of local residents undertook a donation-funded renovation in 1976 as part of the nation's Bicentennial celebration. During the refurbishment, the pistons malfunctioned and were disconnected, and a gasoline-powered motor hidden under the flywheel replaced the pistons' function. The pump station was made part of Crystal Spring Park following the renovation. The site was listed on the National Register of Historic Places in 1980, and it was opened for group tours until the early 1990s.

A second restoration was finished in 2003, and the station was reopened for tours. In 2004, the American Water Works Association named the site an American water landmark. The building closed for two years due to an expansion of the nearby Carilion Roanoke Memorial Hospital, which was being constructed on the site of the former reservoir and tennis courts. As of 2023 the building was once again open for tours on weekends during the summer.
