= Westcott Reservoir =

Reservoir in New York, US

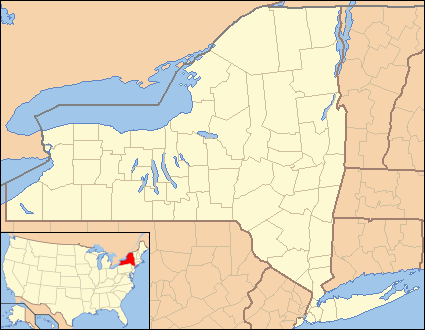
- Location within New York Location within the United States
- Interactive map of Westcott Reservoir
- Location: Onondaga County
- Coordinates: 43°02′37″N 76°12′06″W
- Type: Reservoir
- Part of: Seneca River Basin
- Primary inflows: Skaneateles Lake
- Basin countries: United States
- Managing agency: City of Syracuse
- Built: 1931
- Surface area: 14 acres (5.7 ha)
- Max. depth: 36 feet (11 m)
- Water volume: 110-million-US-gallon (420,000 m^{3})
- Surface elevation: 623 feet (190 m)
- References: AWWA, National Dam Safety Report, 1981

The Westcott Reservoir was an open 110-million-US-gallon (420,000 m^{3}) reservoir serving Syracuse, New York built in 1931. In the early 2000s, it was replaced by twin 32-million-US-gallon (120,000 m^{3}) tanks. The reservoir's location was originally outside the city limits but a shoestring annexation extended the city border to include it. A U.S. Environmental Protection Agency (EPA) grant in 2005 was to replace the deteriorated Hypalon lining; as of October 2005 the reservoir stood empty.{

== Recreation ==
An open grassy hillside descends from the reservoir all around, with the north end facing onto West Genesee Street having the tallest and longest slope, popular for sledding in the winter. The reservoir is considered to be the best place for sledding in the entire Syracuse area, despite the "No Sledding" signs posted along the fence at the top of the hill. On January 10, 2009, 12-year-old Taylor Denson was sledding down the reservoir when she could not stop herself and slammed head first into a parked car. She sustained severe head injuries and died three days later. As a result, the city of Syracuse proposed that an orange fence be put up around the reservoir to further prohibit sledding, and to keep people safe.

Hang-gliders, when the sport was new, used to test fly off the North side although there is no safe direction to go; at least one hang-glider has been seriously injured upon ensnaring in power lines over West Genesee St.

Semi-flat areas along the West side are used for softball and other sports. Local schools, such as Westhill High School, often hold practices on the premises for cross country.

== History ==
In the 1960s and before, a flat grassy terrace that rings the reservoir about 15 feet (4.6 m) below the top, became a popular hangout area. A fence was erected just outside the ring roadway to prevent access in 1973. However, that also prevents use of the terrace by joggers and as a staging area for the sledding in winter.

== See also ==
- List of reservoirs and dams in New York
- Woodland Reservoir
