= Old Fresno Water Tower =

- U.S. National Register of Historic Places
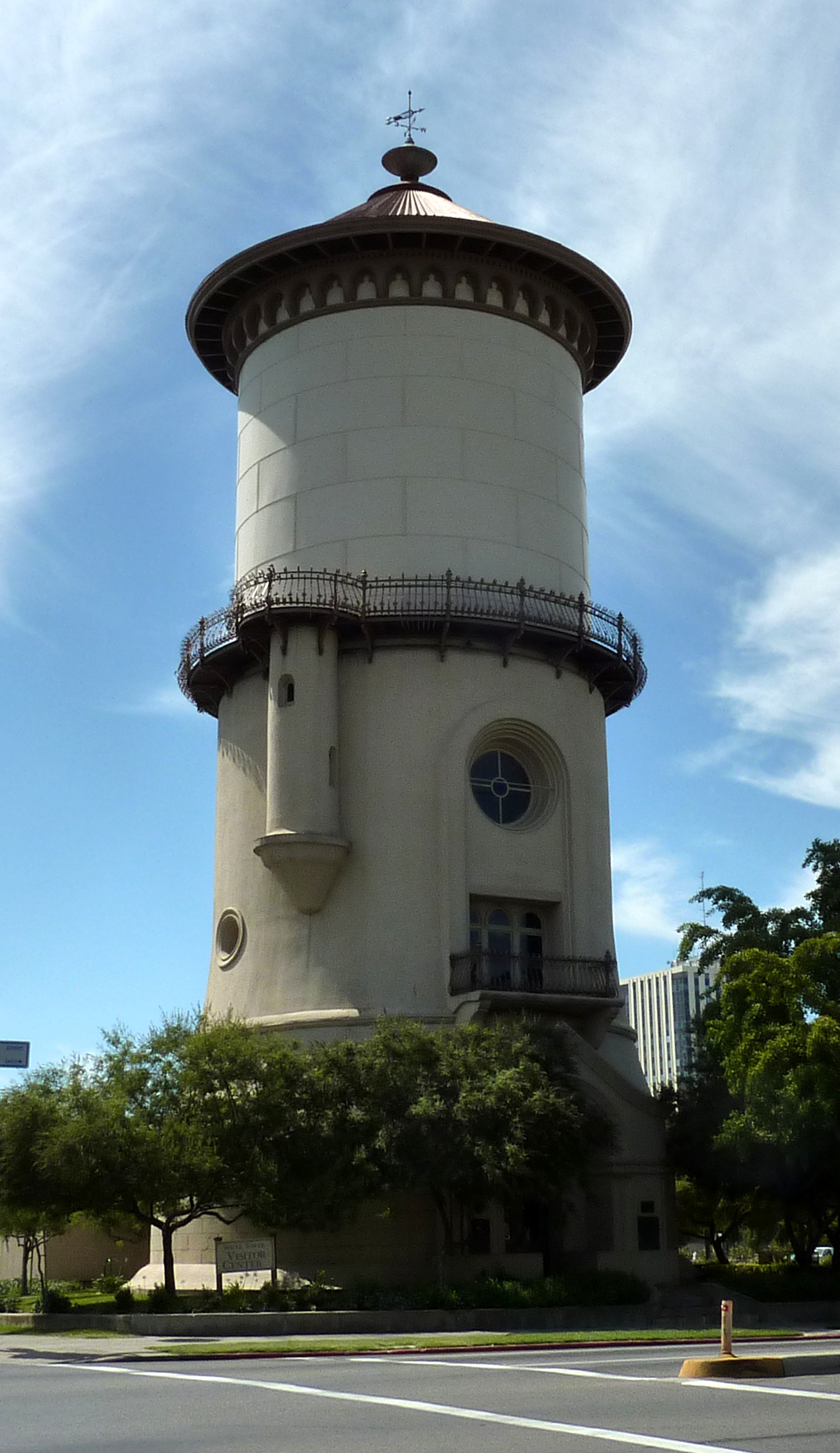
- Water tower in 2009
- Location: 2444 Fresno Street; Fresno, California
- Coordinates: 36.7391°N 119.7872°W
- Built: 1894
- NRHP reference No.: 71000139
- Added to NRHP: October 14, 1971

The Old Fresno Water Tower is a historic water tower in Fresno, California. It is listed on the National Register of Historic Places. Designed by George Washington Maher, the tower was completed in late 1894. It ceased operation in 1963 and has served as a visitors' center since 2001.

== History ==
Chicago architect George Washington Maher was commissioned in 1891 to design a new water tower for Fresno. His design was influenced by the Great Chicago Fire of 1871; the fire destroyed the Chicago Public Library but not the Chicago Water Tower, which then acted as a temporary library. Maher's original design called for a library and a third floor to be built within the tower, but neither was executed. Construction finished in November 1894 at a cost of $20,000. The water tower remained in use until 1963, when its pumping equipment had become inadequate. The water tower was added to the National Register of Historic Places on October 14, 1971. It was designated an American Water Landmark by the American Water Works Association in 1972.

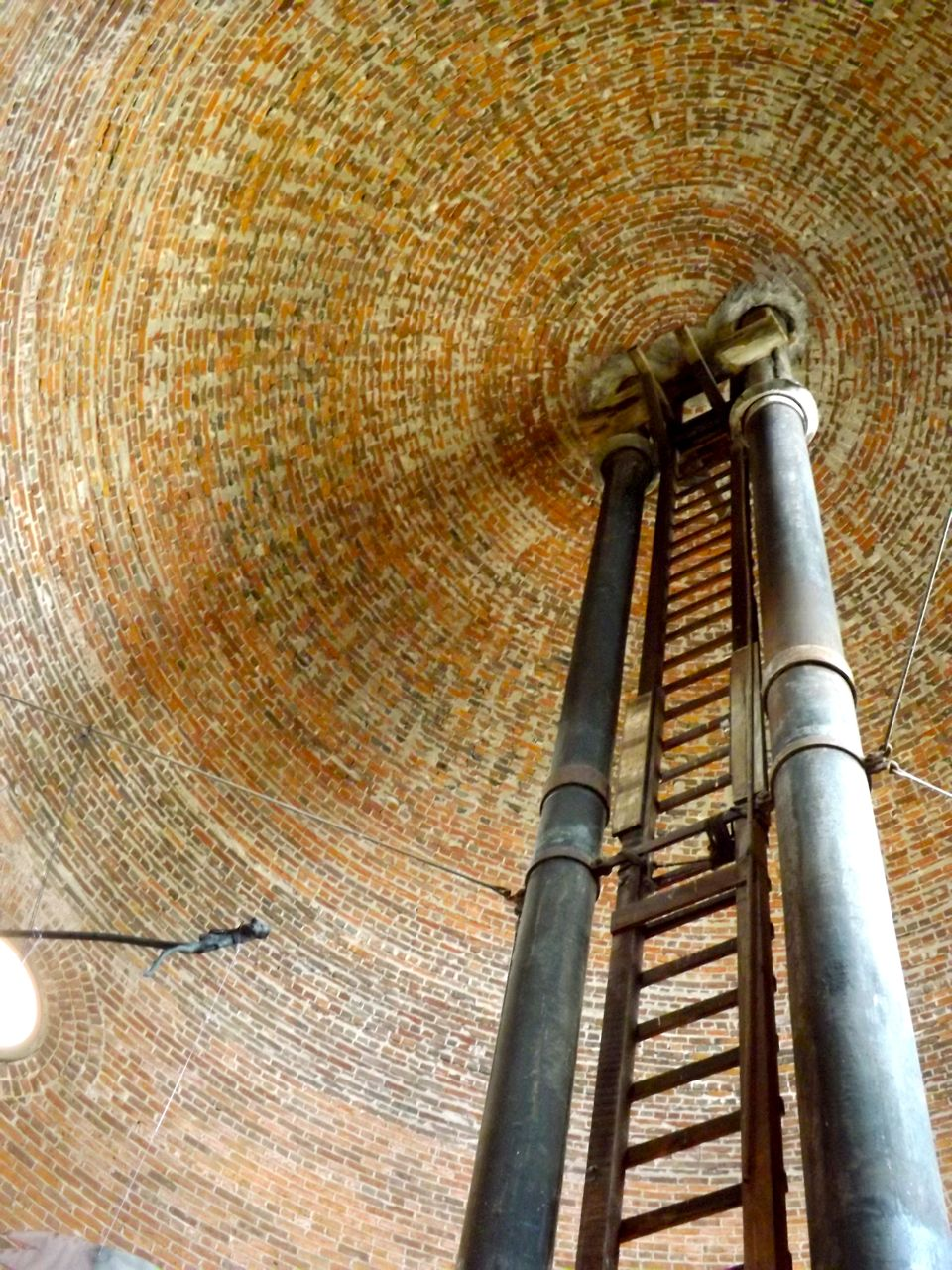
Interior, 2014

The first floor served for many years as a parking meter repair facility. In 2001, the tower was renovated into the visitors' center for Fresno and Fresno County, at which time the second floor was removed. In 2014, the Fresno Art Council assumed management of the water tower which now includes an art gallery.

== Design ==
The structure is an example of American Romanesque architecture. The tower stands 109 feet (33 m) tall, with a 250,000 US gal (950,000 L) water storage tank. The tower has a 2-foot-thick (61 cm) inner wall and a 14-inch (36 cm) outer wall, separated by a 3-foot-wide (91 cm) space. The exterior brick is painted. Because the third story was never built, the second story had a very high ceiling. About halfway up the tower is a balcony decorated with elaborate iron corbels. The roof is made of tile.

== See also ==
- National Register of Historic Places listings in Fresno County, California
