= Lebanon Road Stone Arch Bridge =

- U.S. National Register of Historic Places
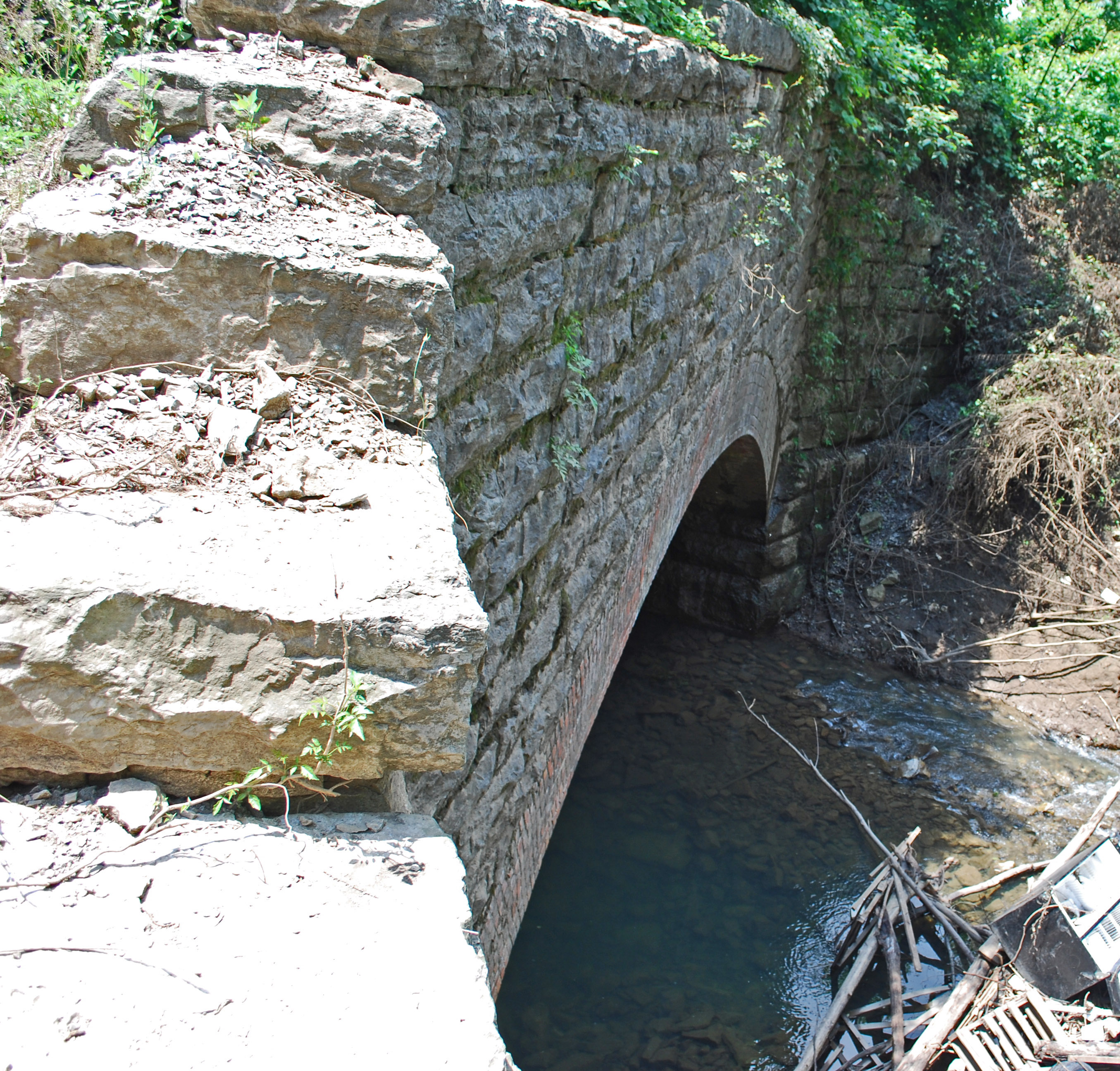

- Location within Tennessee Location within the United States
- Location: Over Brown's Creek at Lebanon Road, Nashville, Tennessee
- Coordinates: 36°9′16″N 86°44′33″W
- Area: less than one acre
- Built: 1888
- Built by: Foster & Creighton Co.
- Architect: J.A. Jowett
- MPS: Omohundro Waterworks System TR
- NRHP reference No.: 87000379
- Added to NRHP: May 13, 1987

The Lebanon Road Stone Arch Bridge is a historic bridge over Brown's Creek in Nashville, Tennessee, U.S.. It was designed by J. A. Jowett, and its construction was completed by the Foster and Creighton Company in 1888. From its construction to 1925, it was used by drivers on Lebanon Road. There is also a water main on the bridge to carry water from a water plant to the Eighth Avenue South Reservoir. It has been listed on the National Register of Historic Places since May 13, 1987.
