= Water For People =

American non-profit aid organization

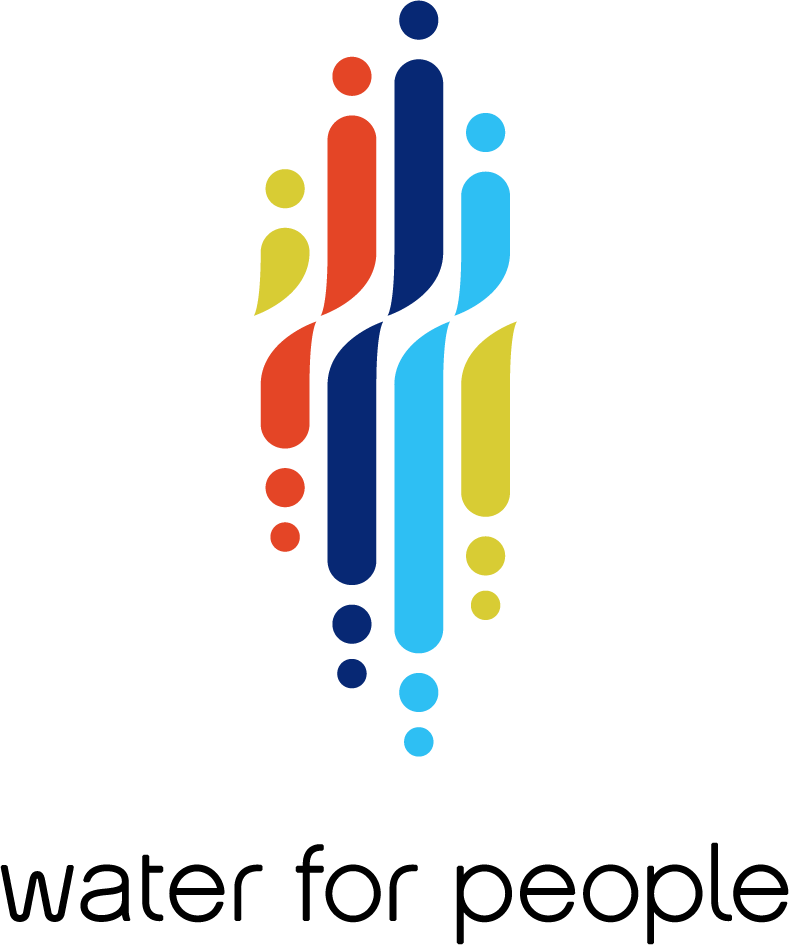
- Type: Nonprofit organization
- Industry: Drinking Water and Sanitation
- Founded: 1991
- Headquarters: Denver, Colorado; United States
- Revenue: 35,979,329 United States Dollars (2024)
- Total assets: 22,676,808 United States Dollars (2024)
- Website: www.waterforpeople.org

Water For People is a nonprofit international development organization founded in 1991 by the American Water Works Association (AWWA) as a response to the increasing water scarcity in developing countries. Its stated mission is to promote the development of high-quality drinking water and sanitation services, accessible to all, and sustained by strong communities, businesses, and governments. This follows the United Nations' 6th Sustainable Development Goal: availability of clean water and sanitation and comprehensive monitoring of freshwater facilities for the progression of human health.

Its goals also include bringing health and hygiene education programs to local districts. It uses a model it calls "Everyone Forever" to measure progress: measuring the quality and coverage of water and sanitation access for every household, community, and public institution (such as schools and health clinics) ("Everyone"); and using a checklist tool to evaluate the sustainability of services through categories such as financing, water resource management, and capacity ("Forever"). These evaluations guide plans, priorities, and learnings. The Everyone Forever model is built to work in a district until local water authorities have the infrastructure, funding, and oversight in place to ensure that everyone will have access to clean water for generations. Since 2024, Water For People has reached 5.2 million people reached with reliable water services.

Water For People works in ten countries around the world: Malawi, Rwanda, Uganda, Tanzania, India, Guatemala, Honduras, Bolivia, and Peru. It also works in the United States to address water inequities through policy, partnerships, and knowledge exchanges.

== Funding and spending ==
Water For People's global strategic partners are The Caterpillar Foundation, charity: water, The Coca-Cola Foundation, Focusing Philanthropy, Kimberly-Clark, LDS Charities, Osprey Foundation, UNOPS, and World Vision. These foundations are its biggest patrons who contribute each over one million dollars continuously. According to the NGO's website, it requires local governments to fund some of the infrastructural development in the community that the government oversees. This allows for the local governments to take ownership of the development taking place in their home districts and allows for the NGO to build long-term and trusted relationships with the local authorities. The organization engages in co-investing/financing, in which the Water For People mandates local governments and businesses to invest in the sustainable outcomes that are beneficial to them. The NGO works with local recipients in deciding the most effective plan for a given community and executing the project together. On December 14, 2022 billionaire philanthropist and novelist MacKenzie Scott announced that her donations since 2019 have totaled more than $14 billion and helped fund around 1,600 nonprofits, including a $15 million grant to Water For People that was confirmed in August 2022.

== Partnerships ==
Water For People partners with local governments, the private sector, and other trusted nongovernmental organizations to support their work. Water For People is a strategic partner with IRC, co-founding the One For All global alliance, which also includes Water For Good. Water For People also partners with DigDeep, and launched Vessel™, a collective that unites efforts in the United States Water, Sanitation, and Hygiene (WASH) space. In 2023, Water For People was commissioned by Inter-American Development Bank with Toilet Board Coalition to scale sanitation businesses in Latin America and The Caribbean. In 2025, Water For People partnered with communications firm Edelman and Toronto-based graphic arts studio the Gas Company to bring attention to the global water crisis, by creating the dehydrating book. The book is printed with a hydrochromic ink that is invisible and becomes visible only when it’s wet. Water For People partners with stakeholders in country – from local community members to district or municipal WASH officers, to national representatives from Ministries of Finance, Health, Education, and the Environment. By working across these groups to equip, train, and implement, Water For People ensures services can be sustainable and maintained - without external or ongoing aid. Water For People has prioritized protection of freshwater resources as part of its systems strengthening Everyone Forever approach, and began a partnership with The Nature Conservancy in 2019 to bring attention to the full potential of nature-based solutions and larger-scale watershed management. The NGO is not politically nor religiously affiliated, as confirmed by the organization's website and Charity Navigator.

== Ratings ==
Medium, an online publishing platform, conducted an investigation on the cost-effectiveness of donating to popular water NGOs in the world today. As it was reporting on the difficulty of investigating NGOs, Medium did a close-up analysis, and among all the water NGO, Water For People provided the most extensive data to the online rating site of its financials and measurable components of impact in the water and sanitation sector. Water For People has earned a 4-star rating from Charity Navigator for 20 years. The Candid Gold Seal also showcases the organization's commitment to transparency, along with being a certified environmental partner of 1% for the Planet.
