= Eighth Avenue South Reservoir =

Historic reservoir in Nashville, Tennessee

- U.S. National Register of Historic Places
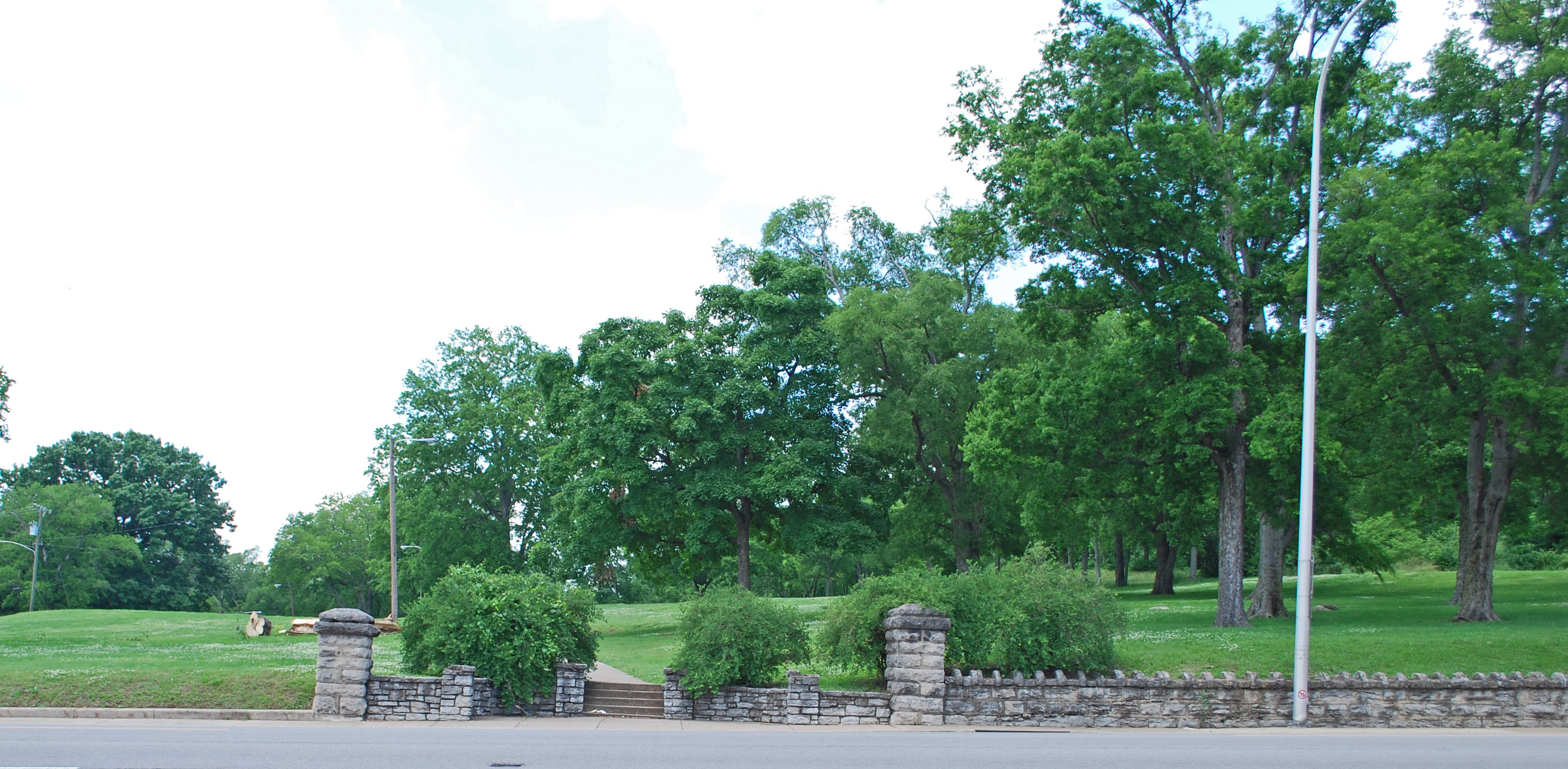
- Eighth Avenue Reservoir Entrance

- Location within Tennessee Location within the United States
- Location: 8th Ave., S. Nashville, Tennessee
- Coordinates: 36.139°N 86.7803°W
- Built: 1887–1889
- Architect: J. A. Jowett
- Website: 8thavenuereservoir.com
- NRHP reference No.: 78002578
- Added to NRHP: March 30, 1978

Eighth Avenue South Reservoir is a man-made masonry reservoir in Nashville, Tennessee. The reservoir was built on Kirkpatrick's Hill which was the former site of Fort Casino: a Union Army fort in the American Civil War. Completed in 1889, it ruptured in 1912 causing much property damage, and was repaired in 1914. In 1978, it was listed on the National Register of Historic Places listings in Davidson County, Tennessee (NRHP). The reservoir is the largest and oldest working reservoir supplying water to the city of Nashville, and remains in use as of 2022.

== Design and construction ==
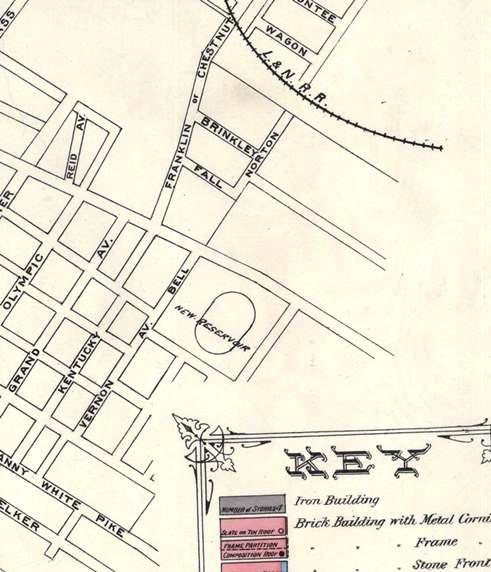
1888 Sanborn Map showing the location of the Eighth Avenue South Reservoir

The city of Nashville, Tennessee, sought to improve its waterworks in the late nineteenth century. The Mayor and the City Council directed the Board of Public Works and Affairs to hire a hydraulic engineer to determine the best location for a reservoir. Engineer Charles Hermany was hired and he determined that Curry Hill was the least expensive option at a construction cost of US$401,589.00. City engineer J. A. Jowett estimated that it would cost US$362,375 to build the masonry reservoir structure on Kirkpatrick's Hill instead. (This had previously been the site of Fort Casino, a Union Army fort built during the American Civil War.) Jowett's recommendation was selected and the final cost of construction was $364,525.21, equal to roughly $11,795,996.17 in 2022.

The project was designed by Jowett in 1887 and the reservoir was completed in 1889. The construction contractors for the two-year project were Whitsett and Adams with a force of more than 550 workers. Many of the stones used were taken from the ruins of nearby Fort Negley, hauled by African American laborers, and from a quarry on Curry Hill.

The reservoir is above-ground and has an elliptical shape, 603 by 463 feet (184 by 141 m). The 34-foot-high (10 m) walls are made of limestone, tapering in thickness from almost 23 feet (7.0 m) at the bottom to 9 feet (2.7 m) at the top. The circumference of the structure is approximately one-third of a mile (540 m). The reservoir has a maximum capacity of 51 million US gallons (190,000 m^{3}) of water divided equally in two chambers which are separated by a north–south center wall. Atop this wall is a brick Victorian-style gatehouse which houses operating valves and also provides lodgings for a custodian. There is a path along the top of the reservoir where Nashville residents used to walk and ride bicycles. The path was closed in 1917 due to public fears during World War I that Germans might try to poison the drinking water.

Built on a defective foundation of "thin layers of limestone interspersed with clay", the reservoir was prone to leakage, as became evident when the southeastern wall collapsed in 1912.

== 1912 collapse ==
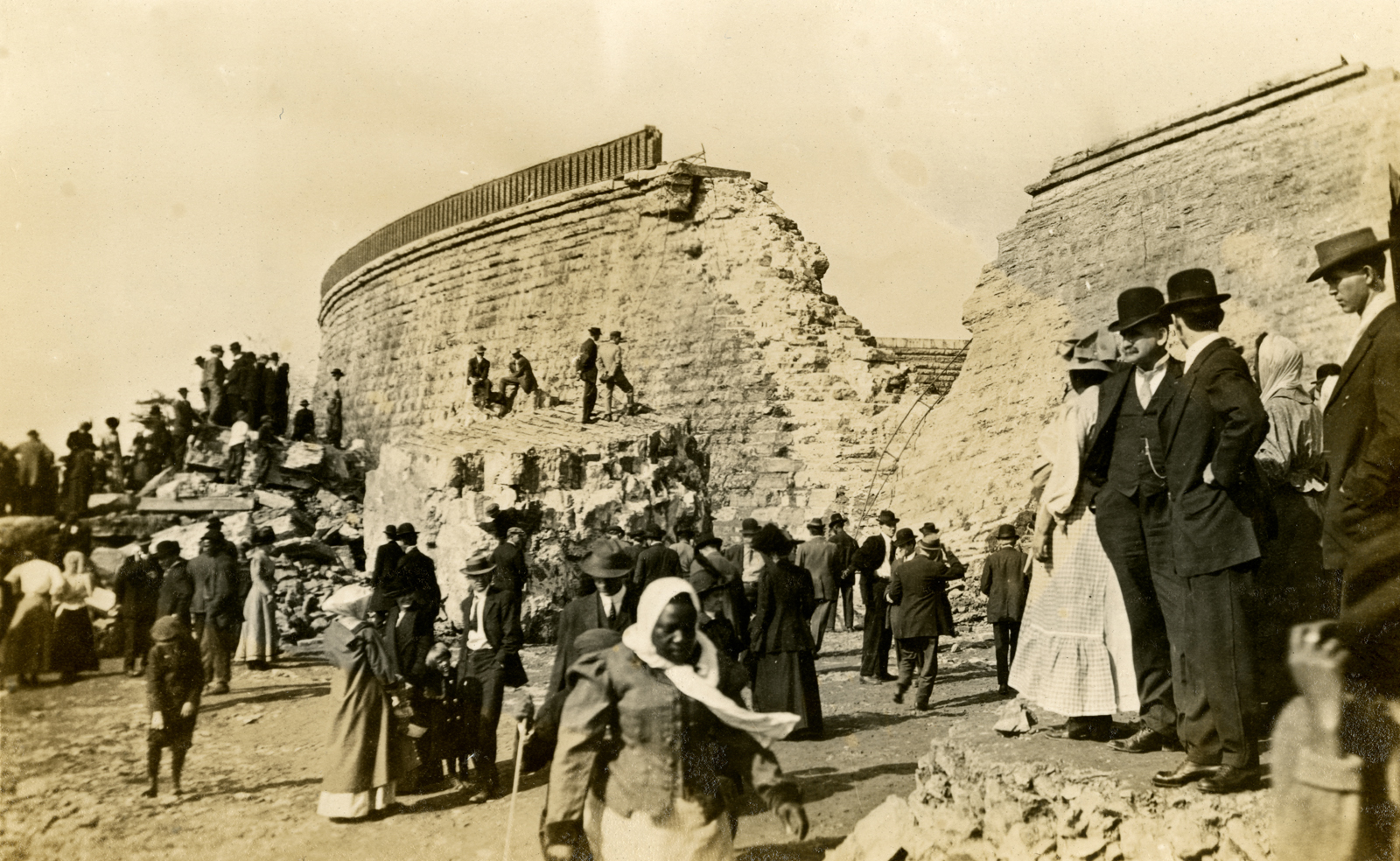
1912 Nashville residents inspect the V-shaped rupture after the Eighth Avenue South Reservoir collapsed on November 5, 1912.

At approximately 12:00 a.m. on November 5, 1912, the southeastern side of the reservoir's main wall ruptured in a 175-foot (53 m) V-shaped breach which allowed nearly 25 million US gallons (95,000 m^{3}) of water to flood the nearby neighborhood. There was no loss of life, but five homes were completely destroyed. The collapse led city officials to order concrete reinforcement of the reservoir.

The Nashville Tennessean reported that the flood had washed away homes and forced people to climb trees to escape. One family was also carried out by the waters while lying in bed. George R. Zepp states in his book Hidden History of Nashville that "T. M. Heffy of 1502 Eighth Street was swept away still lying in the floating bed he shared with his wife and child". The property damage suffered by those in the path of the flood water was estimated to be between $75,000 and $100,000. In addition to the five destroyed homes there were twenty-five other homes which were considerably damaged by the flood. Furniture, dead chickens, rocks and clothing were strewn about the streets the next morning.

=== Repairs ===
The center wall dividing the reservoir into two basins held, and prevented the loss of water from the western half. Engineers determined that the reservoir could be repaired and would not need to be reconstructed elsewhere. A contractor was hired to repair the wall using concrete and the original stones. The repairs were completed in 1914 at a cost of $70,000.

Also in 1914, 20 acres (8.1 ha) of land to the south of the reservoir was set aside as a public park.

== Operations ==
A pumping station (named the George Reyer Pumping Station in 1932 and later incorporated into the Omohundro Water Treatment Plant) was built of limestone and brick and completed the same year as the reservoir. It pumped raw water from the Cumberland River into the western half of the reservoir, where sediment was allowed to settle. The water was then filtered into drinkable water as it entered the eastern half. In 1908, a system was implemented to clarify the water through sedimentation and coagulation. In 1909, a sterilization process was introduced.

Following the discovery of leaks in 1920, both chambers of the reservoir were relined and waterproofed. In 1974 the reservoir was covered with a polyvinyl material. In the 1990s the city of Nashville began to add purifying chemicals to the water. In February 2022, a new tank was being installed with a design to churn the water to prevent it from becoming stagnant. This renovation project was expected to take years to complete.

As of 2022, the structure remains operational as a storage facility for purified water. It is the largest and oldest of the 37 reservoirs supplying water to the city of Nashville. In recent decades, seismic meters have been used to monitor ground movement or excess moisture which could indicate possible problems.

== Historical preservation ==
In 1971, the American Water Works Association (AWWA) designated the Eighth Avenue South Reservoir as an American Water Landmark for its historical significance. It was one of the first 14 facilities in the US to receive this distinction.

The reservoir was added to the National Register of Historic Places on March 30, 1978. Two months later, the George Reyer Pumping Station was also added to the NRHP.

== See also ==
- Omohundro Water Treatment Plant
