= Robert P. Bush =

American politician (1842–1923)

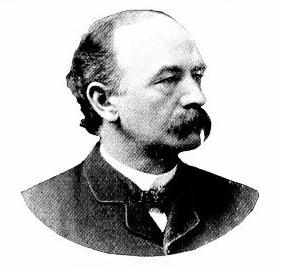
Robert P. Bush (1894)

Robert P. Bush (March 31, 1842 in Branchport, Yates County, New York - January 8, 1923 in Elmira, Chemung County, New York) was an American physician, soldier and politician.

== Life ==
He was the son of Dr. Wynans Bush (1799–1889) and Julia Ann Loomis Bush (1805–1898). He was educated at academies in Franklin and Cortland. He Graduated from Bellevue Medical College and the medical school of Buffalo University. Afterwards he settled in Horseheads and practiced medicine there.

He enlisted as a private in the 12th Regiment, New York Volunteer Infantry, and fought the First Battle of Bull Run, the Battle of Yorktown, the Seven Days' Battles, the Battle of Fredericksburg, and the Battle of Antietam. Then he re-enlisted in the 185th Regiment, New York Volunteer Infantry, and became a captain, and later a major. He was captured during the Battle of Hatcher's Run by the Confederate Army, and subsequently exchanged.

On September 1, 1870, he married Laretta Ludlow (1847–1925).

He entered politics as a Democrat, and was School Commissioner of Chemung County from 1875 to 1878, Excise Commissioner for the Town of Horseheads from 1878 to 1882, and Coroner of Chemung County in 1883.

He was a member of the New York State Assembly (Chemung Co.) in 1886, 1887, 1888, 1889, 1890, 1891, 1892, 1894, 1911, 1912, 1913, 1916 and 1917; and was Speaker in 1892, and Chairman of the Committee on Ways and Means in 1913. In 1888, Republicans nominated Edward M. Hoffman to oppose Bush after their original nominee withdrew; Bush won the general election.

In 1920, he was President of the Board of Trustees of the Soldiers and Sailors' Home at Bath, New York, and testified at a hearing before Lt. Gov. Harry C. Walker, denying charges of mismanagement and cruelty.

He died on January 8, 1923, at the Amot Ogdon Hospital in Elmira, of pneumonia; and was buried at the Maple Grove Cemetery in Horseheads.

== Sources ==
- A character study of the Speaker-to-be, in NYT on December 28, 1891
- Democratic assemblymen's caucus, in NYT on January 5, 1892
- American Biographical Archive p310 at freepages.genealogy.rootsweb.com Short bio, at Rootsweb
- Horseheads Old Oak Lodge #364, Horseheads, NY Website at www.horseheadsmasons.com Horseheads Old Oak lodge
- RootsWeb: NYFingerLakes-L Re: (NYFingerLakes-L) GERTRUDE BUSH BRADLEY in King's Ferry/Genoa, Cayuga Co, and PennYan, Yates Co at archiver.rootsweb.com Bush ancestry, at Rootsweb
- The hearing at Bath, in NYT on March 23, 1920
- Maple Grove Cemetery - Tombstone Readings 2000 / 2001 at www.joycetice.com Burial record, at Joyce Tice's Tri-Counties Genealogy site

New York State Assembly
Preceded by Jonas S. Van Duzer	New York State Assembly; Chemung County; 1886–1892	Succeeded by John M. Diven
Preceded by John M. Diven	New York State Assembly; Chemung County; 1894	Succeeded by John B. Stanchfield
Preceded by Seymour Lowman	New York State Assembly; Chemung County; 1911–1917	Succeeded by John J. Richford
Political offices
Preceded by William F. Sheehan	Speaker of the New York State Assembly; 1892	Succeeded by William Sulzer
