= Jonas S. Van Duzer =

American politician (1846–1918)

Jonas Sayre Van Duzer (December 2, 1846 – June 14, 1918) was an American creamery manufacturer and politician from New York.

== Life ==
Van Duzer was born on December 2, 1846, in Horseheads, New York, the son of William Henry Van Duzer and Susan R. Sayre. He was born and raised on his family farm, which he later owned.

Van Duzer attended Alfred University from 1862 to 1866. He briefly attended Amherst College, but he left in 1867 to work as a clerk in his uncle Selah R. Van Duzer's wholesale drug house in New York City. He worked there for the next 18 months, returning to Horseheads and entering the dairying and creamery business shortly after his marriage in 1869. At around that time he served as an editor for The Husbandman, an agricultural journal published in Elmira, for four years. In 1891, he started a winter creamery in Horseheads, the first in the valley. This turned into the Horseheads Creamery Company in 1894, which was the president of. His creamery was one of the first in the country to use the Babcock test to test for milk quality, introduce a refrigerator plant to control the temperature in the creamery, and to pasteurize the cream commercially. He also served as secretary of the Chemung Valley Tobacco Growers Association, during which time he played a role in developing tariff schedules for the McKinley Tariff, and spent time in Washington, D.C., where he was regularly and frequently consulted by congressional committees as a farmer.

In 1872, Van Duzer was elected School Commissioner, an office he held until 1875. In 1880, he was appointed to fill an unexpired term after the Commissioner died. In 1883, he was elected to the New York State Assembly as a Republican, representing Chemung County. He served in the Assembly in 1884 and 1885. In 1889, he was appointed Postmaster. He befriended Theodore Roosevelt when the two served in the Assembly together, and in the 1914 United States House of Representatives election he was the Progressive candidate for New York's 37th congressional district. He lost the election to Harry H. Pratt.

In 1869, Van Duzer married Julia Amanda Rogers, a descendant of the martyr John Rogers. They had one adopted daughter, Julianna, whose husband John H. Kane was connected with the Horseheads Creamery Company.

Van Duzer died of apoplexy in Horseheads on June 14, 1918. He was buried in Woodlawn Cemetery in Elmira.

New York State Assembly
Preceded by Jeremiah J. O'Connor	New York State Assembly; Chemung County; 1884–1885	Succeeded by Robert P. Bush
