= Lithia Fountain =

Drinking fountain in Ashland, Oregon, U.S.

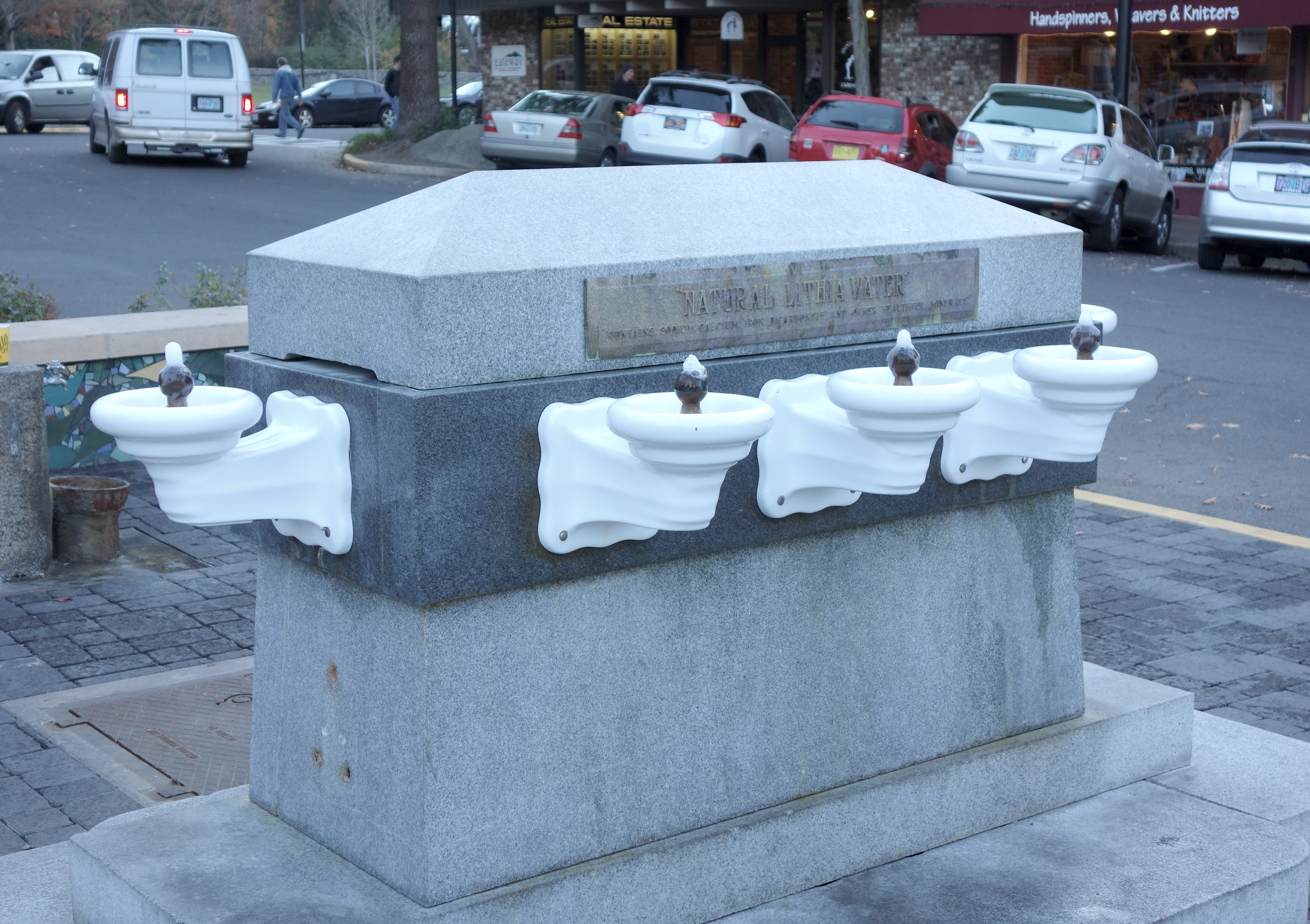
- The fountain in 2013
- Year: 1927
- Location: Ashland, Oregon, U.S.; 42.197063°N 122.715417°W

The Lithia Fountain is a fountain in Ashland, Oregon, United States, installed in 1927. Health benefits of water from the fountain, and the city's others, have been debated.

High barium levels forced the city's public works department to turn off the fountains temporarily in 2016.
