= Jordan and Salt Lake City Canal =

Coordinates: 40°37′35″N 111°52′35″W

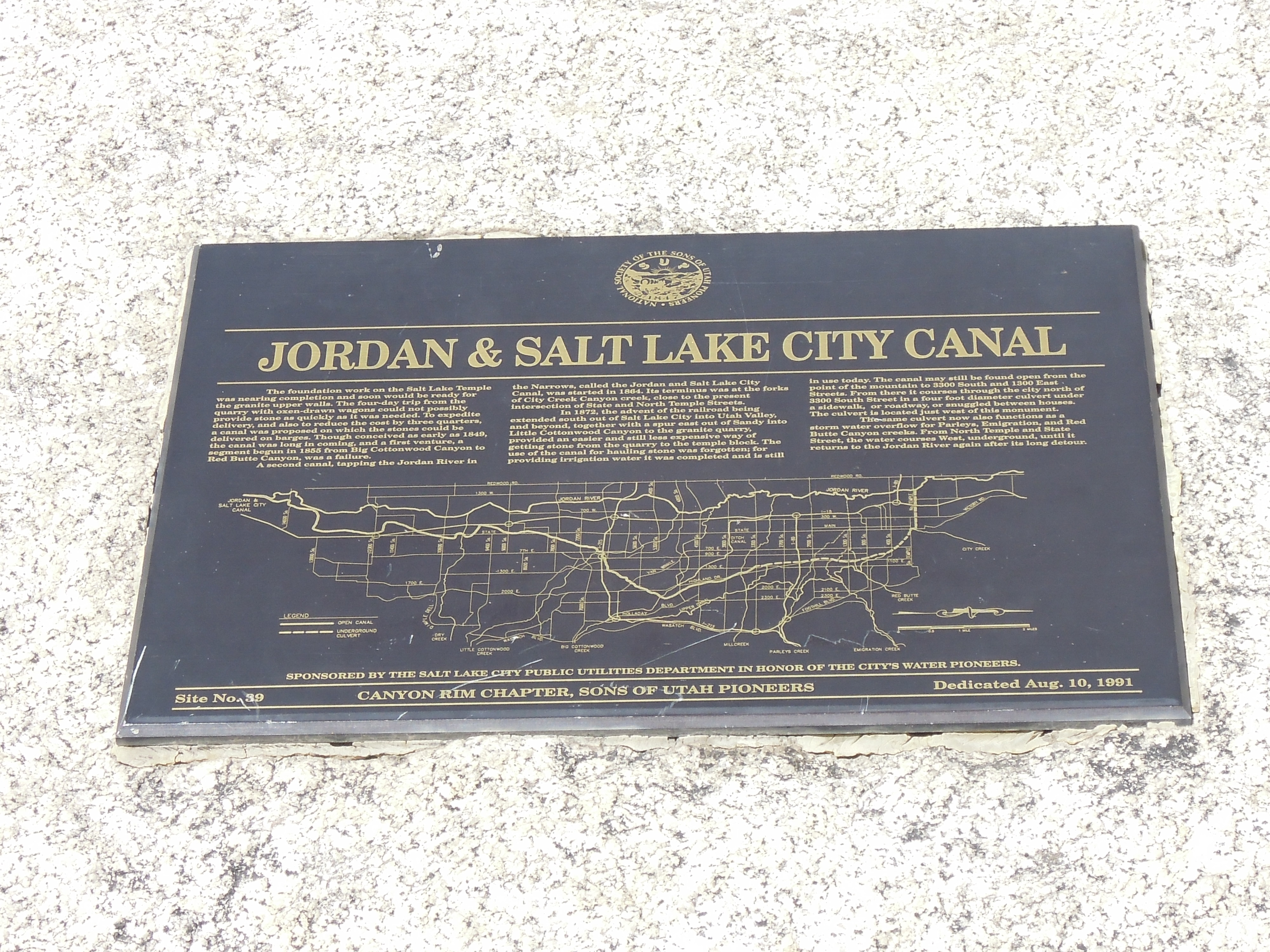
Plaque for the Jordan and Salt Lake City Canal in Sugar House, September 2016

The Jordan and Salt Lake City Canal is a 28-mile (45 km) historic waterway in Salt Lake County, Utah, United States.

== Description ==
It was first envisioned in 1849 and construction began in 1855. Initially conceived as a way to transport granite blocks from a quarry in Little Cottonwood Canyon to the construction site of the future Salt Lake Temple (a railroad spur from the canyon to the temple grounds was completed before this could become a reality), the canal evolved into a typical irrigation waterway.
