= Omohundro Water Treatment Plant =

- U.S. National Register of Historic Places
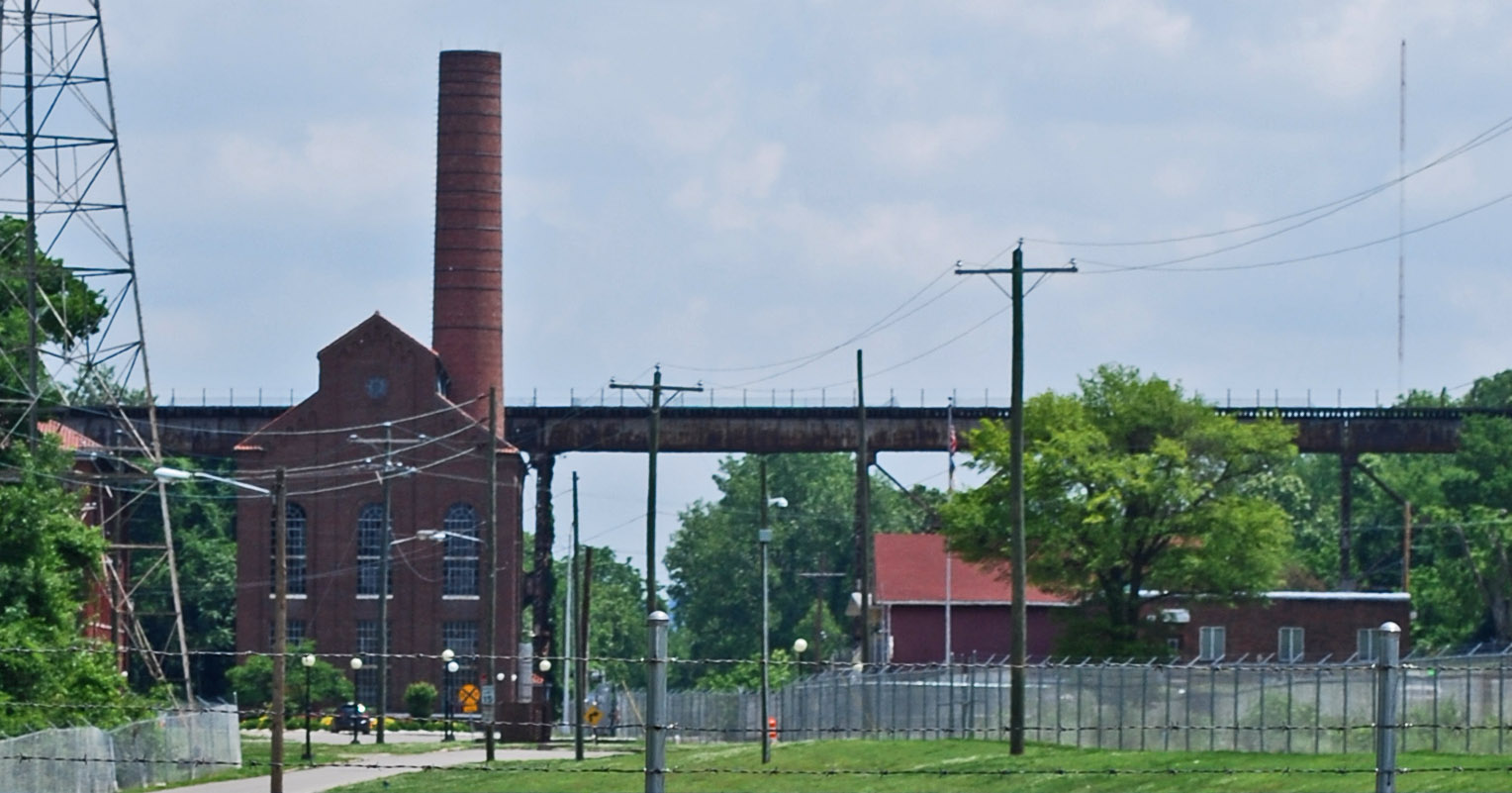

- Location within Tennessee Location within the United States
- Location: NE Omohundro Drive, Nashville, Tennessee
- Coordinates: 36°9′43″N 86°43′23″W
- Built: 1888
- Architectural style: Gothic Revival
- NRHP reference No.: 87000380
- Added to NRHP: May 13, 1987

Omohundro Water Treatment Plant is a municipal water treatment plant located in Davidson County, Nashville, Tennessee on Omohundro Drive.

Built in 1888, the pump station and boiler house were designed by C. K. Colley. Fitted with Holly-Gaskill pumps that transfer 10 million gallons of water per day from the Cumberland River to the City Reservoir on Kirkpatrick's Hill at Eighth Avenue, South.

The steam-powered generators were converted to electricity in 1952. The filtration plant was completed in 1929 after the intake station, stores and pumps. In 1987 it was added to the US National Register of Historic Places.

The plant was threatened during the 2010 Tennessee floods, a devastating flood in Nashville but major damage was avoided with a sandbagging effort.
