= American Water Works Association =

Non-profit association

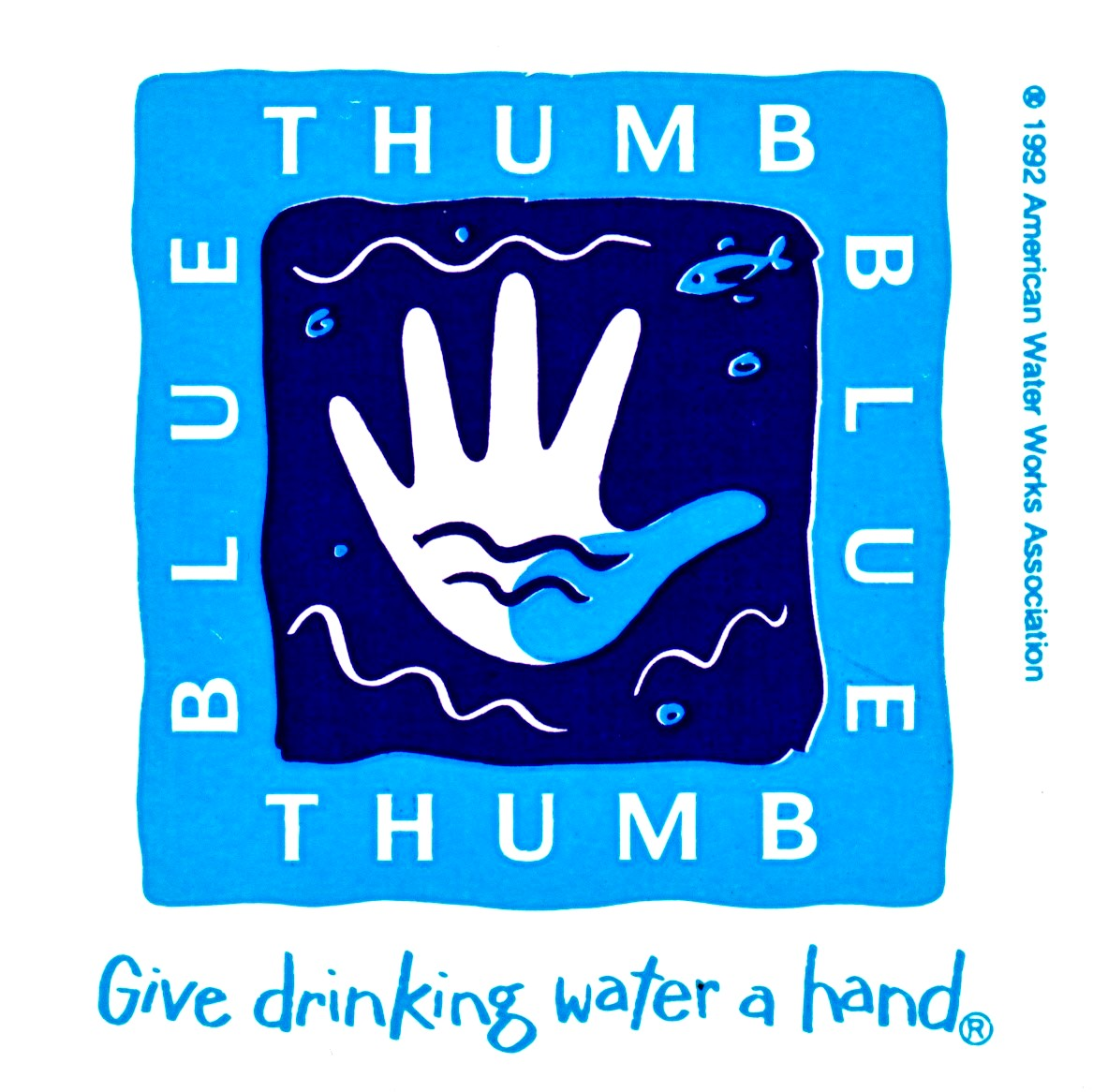
- Abbreviation: AWWA
- Formation: 1881
- Type: Non-governmental organization
- Tax ID no.: 13-5660277
- Legal status: 501(c)(3)
- Headquarters: Denver, Colorado
- Region served: United States, India
- Revenue: $35.4 million (2022)
- Expenses: $32.5 million (2022)
- Website: www.awwa.org

American Water Works Association (AWWA) is an international non-profit, scientific and educational association founded to improve water quality and supply. Established in 1881, it is an organization representing a membership (as of 2026) of around 50,000 members worldwide.

AWWA members include: water utilities, treatment plant operators and managers, scientists, environmentalists, manufacturers, academics, regulators, and others with an interest in water supply and public health. AWWA works through advocacy, communications, conferences, education and training, science and technology, and local action among 43 AWWA Sections throughout North America.

== History ==
In 1908, AWWA began developing industry standards for products, processes and best practices. The AWWA Standards Program is recognized internationally as a source for scientific and management reference resources for the water community. Currently, there are over 200 AWWA Standards covering filtration materials, treatment chemicals, disinfection practices, meters, valves, utility management practices, storage tanks, pumps, and ductile iron, steel, concrete, asbestos-cement, and plastic pipe and fittings. Standing committees periodically review and update the standards as required.

In reviewing the success of the Safe Drinking Water Act after 1974, senior EPA officials cite the vital role that AWWA played as a neutral meeting ground, particularly at the local level.

In May 1985, the United States Environmental Protection Agency entered into a cooperative agreement with a consortium led by NSF International to develop voluntary third-party consensus standards and a certification program for all direct and indirect drinking water additives. Other members of the consortium include AWWA. The consortium is responsible for the cooperative effort of manufacturers, regulators, product users and other interested parties that develop and maintain the NSF standards.

In 1988, AWWA together with the League of Women Voters, the Association of State Drinking Water Administrators and the US Environmental Protection Agency formed a coalition to pass a Congressional resolution naming the first week of May as "Drinking Water Week."

In February 1991, AWWA founded Water For People, a non-profit international development organization that helps people in developing countries improve their quality of life by supporting the development of locally sustainable drinking water resources, sanitation facilities, and health and hygiene education programs.

The AWWA has sued the EPA on at least two occasions over drinking water standards:

- In 1994, they sued and won over the lead in drinking water rules, specifically challenging "the inclusion of privately owned water lines in the definition of distribution facilities under a public water system's control.
- In June, 2024, together with the Association of Metropolitan Water Agencies, they sued over the PFAS contamination limits claiming that "EPA has significantly underestimated the costs of this rule and the adverse impact that it will have on individual water users" and that they "did not rely on the best available science".

== Publications and conferences ==
To broaden distribution of information on water and related subjects, AWWA publishes the periodicals Journal AWWA and Opflow. AWWA also publishes a variety of books, training manuals, standards, reports and videos for use by water professionals and others. The Association also hosts an annual conference and exposition for the entire organization each summer in North America. Section conferences are also held in all parts of North America. Specialty conferences are held throughout the year on topics including water quality, distribution systems and utility management. Proceedings of the annual and specialty conferences are published by AWWA.

In cooperation with other professional associations, AWWA is a resource for water professionals’ continuing education and development.

== Water industry resources ==
Through the Partnership for Safe Water, AWWA also works with the United States Environmental Protection Agency and other water organizations to help water providers optimize system performance beyond existing regulatory levels.

== Sections ==
AWWA is an umbrella organization for 43 sections, each of whom represents a specific geographic region. There are 37 AWWA sections in the United States, 5 Canadian sections, and one each in Mexico and Puerto Rico.

AWWA launched AWWAIndia, its first international community, in 2015. AWWAIndia's headquarters office is located in Mumbai, India.

== See also ==
- American Water Landmark
- Water Environment Federation
- Water For People
- Water management
- Water supply and sanitation in the United States
