= James B. Weaver =

American politician (1833–1912)

- Portrait, c. 1879–1880

Member of the U.S. House of Representatives from Iowa's 6th district
- In office March 4, 1885 – March 3, 1889
- Preceded by: John C. Cook
- Succeeded by: John F. Lacey
- In office March 4, 1879 – March 3, 1881
- Preceded by: Ezekiel S. Sampson
- Succeeded by: Marsena E. Cutts

Mayor of Colfax, Iowa
- In office 1901–1903
- Preceded by: Phineas Cragan
- Succeeded by: John Hahn

Personal details
- Born: James Baird Weaver; June 12, 1833 Dayton, Ohio, U.S.
- Died: February 6, 1912 (aged 78) Des Moines, Iowa, U.S.
- Resting place: Woodland Cemetery
- Party: Republican (until 1876); Greenback (1877–1889); Populist (1890–1908); Democratic (1908–1912)
- Spouse: Clarrisa Vinson (m. 1858)
- Children: 8
- Education: University of Cincinnati (LLB)
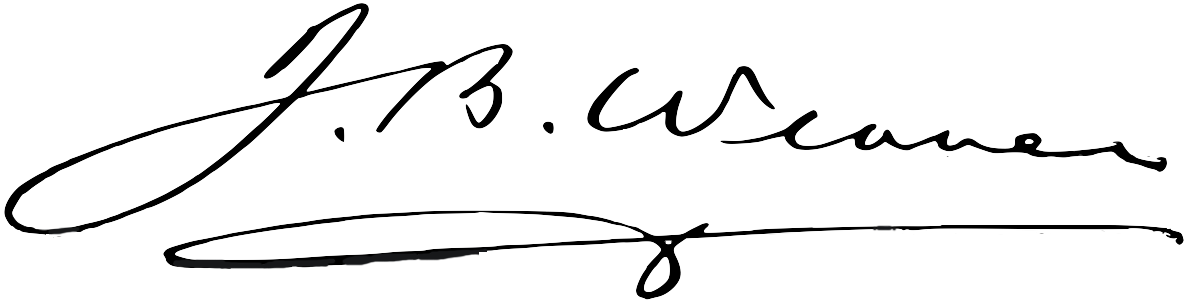
- Signature

Military service
- Allegiance: United States
- Branch/service: Union Army
- Years of service: 1861–1864
- Rank: Brevet brigadier general; Colonel
- Commands: 2nd Iowa Volunteer Infantry Regiment
- Battles/wars: American Civil War

James Baird Weaver (June 12, 1833 – February 6, 1912) was an American politician in Iowa who was a member of the United States House of Representatives and two-time candidate for President of the United States. He joined the Republicans, opposed slavery, and served as an officer in the Union army during the Civil War, but after 1876 he switched to the Greenbacks, then the Populists, and finally the Democrats. He trained as a lawyer. Late in his career he served as mayor of Colfax, Iowa. He wrote A Call to Action: An Interpretation of the Great Uprising, Its Source and Causes published in 1892 when he was a Populist Party candidate for the U.S. presidency, he later wrote a history of Jasper County, Iowa.

Born in Ohio, he moved to Iowa as a boy when his family claimed a homestead on the frontier. He became politically active as a young man and was an advocate for farmers and laborers. He joined and quit several political parties in the furtherance of the progressive causes in which he believed. After serving in the Union Army in the American Civil War, Weaver returned to Iowa and worked for the election of Republican candidates.

After several unsuccessful attempts at Republican nominations to various offices, and growing dissatisfied with the conservative wing of the party, in 1877, Weaver switched to the Greenback Party, which supported increasing the money supply and regulating big business. As a Greenbacker with Democratic support, Weaver won election to the House in 1878. The Greenbackers nominated Weaver for president in 1880, but he received only 3.3 percent of the popular vote. After several more attempts at elected office, he was again elected to the House in 1884 and 1886. In Congress, he worked for expansion of the money supply and for the opening of Indian Territory to white settlement.

As the Greenback Party fell apart, a new anti-big business third party, the People's Party ("Populists"), arose. Weaver helped to organize the party and was their nominee for president in 1892. This time he was more successful and gained 8.5 percent of the popular vote and won five states, but still fell far short of victory. The Populists merged with the Democrats by the end of the 19th century, and Weaver went with them, promoting the candidacy of William Jennings Bryan for president in 1896, 1900, and 1908. After serving as mayor of his home town, Colfax, Iowa, Weaver retired from his pursuit of elective office. He died in Iowa in 1912. Most of Weaver's political goals remained unfulfilled at his death, but many came to pass in the following decades.

== Early years ==
James Baird Weaver was born in Dayton, Ohio, on June 12, 1833, the fifth of thirteen children of Abram Weaver and Susan Imlay Weaver. Weaver's father was a farmer, also born in Ohio, and a descendant of Revolutionary War veterans. He married Weaver's mother, who was from New Jersey, in 1824. Shortly after Weaver's birth, in 1835, the family moved to a farm nine miles north of Cassopolis, Michigan. In 1842, the family moved again to the Iowa Territory to await the opening of former Sac and Fox land to white settlement the following year. They claimed a homestead along the Chequest Creek in Davis County. Abram Weaver built a house and farmed his new land until 1848, when the family moved to Bloomfield, the county seat.

Abram Weaver, a Democrat involved in local politics, was elected clerk of the district court in 1848; he often vied for election to other offices, usually unsuccessfully. James Weaver's brother-in-law, Hosea Horn, a Whig, was appointed postmaster the following year, and through him James Weaver secured his first job, delivering mail to neighboring Jefferson County. In 1851 Weaver quit the mail route to read law with Samuel G. McAchran, a local lawyer. Two years later, Weaver interrupted his legal career to accompany another brother-in-law, Dr. Calvin Phelps, on a cattle drive overland from Bloomfield to Sacramento, California. Weaver initially intended to stay and prospect for gold, but instead booked passage on a ship for Panama. He crossed the isthmus, boarded another ship to New York, and returned home to Iowa.

Upon his return, Weaver worked briefly as a store clerk before resuming the study of law. He enrolled in the Cincinnati Law School in 1855, where he studied under Bellamy Storer. While in Cincinnati, Weaver began to question his support for the institution of slavery, a change biographers attribute to Storer's influence. After graduating in 1856 Weaver returned to Bloomfield and was admitted to the Iowa bar. By 1857, he had broken with the Democratic Party of his father to join the growing coalition that opposed the expansion of slavery, which became the Republican Party.

Weaver traveled around southern Iowa in 1858, giving speeches on behalf of his new party's candidates. That summer, he married Clarrisa (Clara) Vinson, a schoolteacher from nearby Keosauqua, Iowa, whom he had courted since he returned from Cincinnati. The marriage lasted until Weaver's death in 1912 and the couple had eight children. After the wedding, Weaver started a law firm with Hosea Horn and continued his involvement in Republican politics. He gave several speeches on behalf of Samuel J. Kirkwood for governor in 1859 in a campaign that focused heavily on the slavery debate; although the Republicans lost Weaver's Davis County, Kirkwood narrowly won the election. The next year, Weaver served as a delegate to the state convention and, although not a national delegate, traveled with the Iowa delegation to the 1860 Republican National Convention, where Abraham Lincoln was nominated. Lincoln carried Iowa and won the election, but Southern states responded to the Republican victory by seceding from the Union. By April 1861, the American Civil War had begun.

== Civil War ==
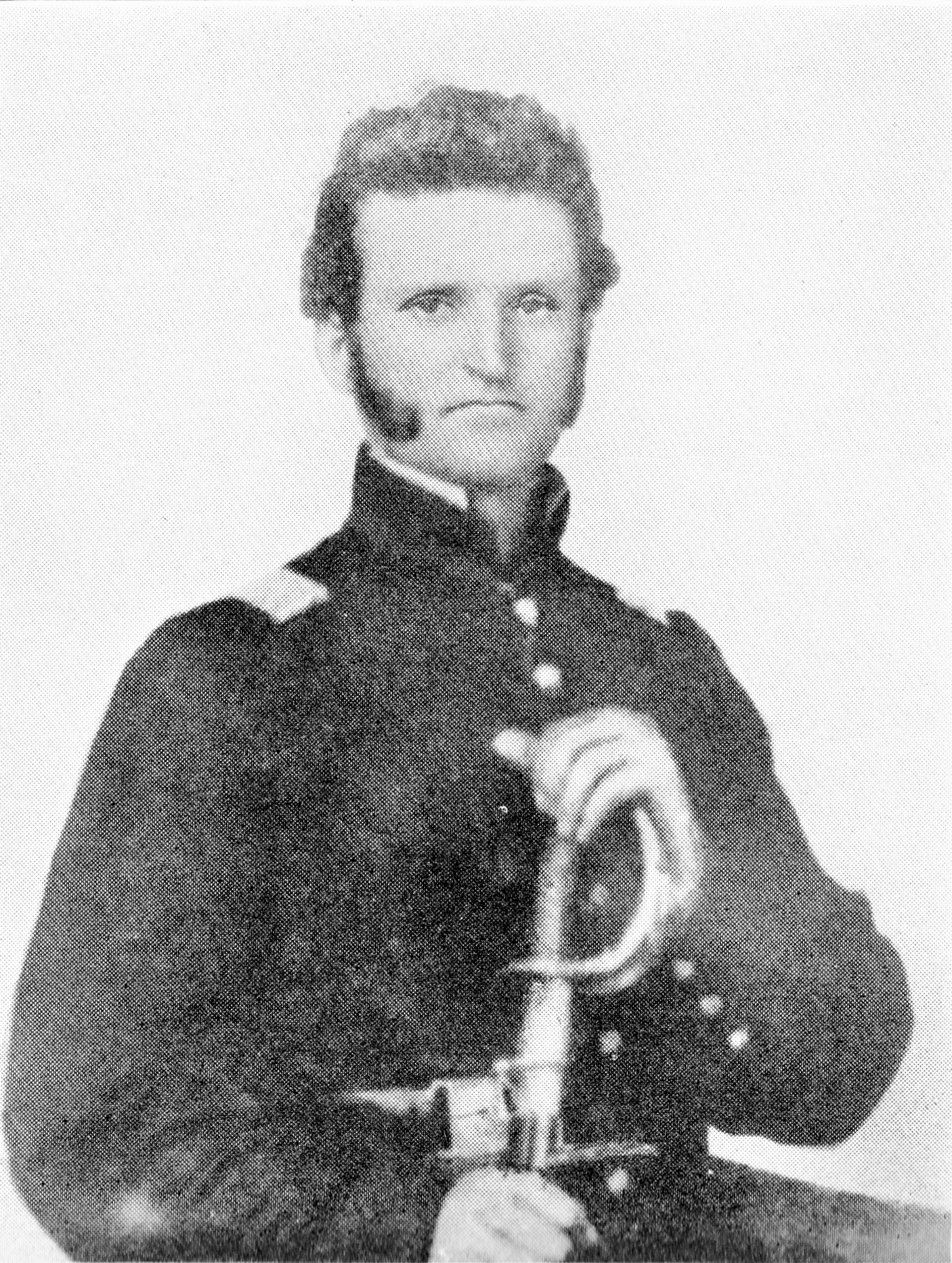
Lieutenant James B. Weaver

After the Confederate attack on Fort Sumter, Lincoln called for 75,000 men to join the Union Army. Weaver enlisted in what became Company G of the 2nd Iowa Volunteer Infantry Regiment, and was elected the company's first lieutenant. The 2nd Iowa, commanded by Colonel Samuel Ryan Curtis, a former Congressman, was ordered to Missouri in June 1861 to secure railroad lines in that border state. Weaver's unit spent that summer in northern Missouri and did not see action. Meanwhile Clara gave birth to the couple's second child and first son, named James Bellamy Weaver after his father and Bellamy Storer.

Weaver's first chance at action came in February 1862, when the 2nd Iowa joined Brigadier General Ulysses S. Grant's army outside the Confederate Fort Donelson in Tennessee. Weaver's company was in the thick of the fight, which he described as a "holocaust to the demon of battles", and he took a minor wound in the arm. The rebels surrendered the next day, the most important Union victory of the war to date. The 2nd Iowa next joined other units in the area at Pittsburg Landing, Tennessee, to mass for a major assault deeper into the South. Confederate forces met them there, in the Battle of Shiloh. Weaver's regiment was in the center of the Union lines, in the area later known as the "hornets' nest", and retreated amid fierce fighting. The next day, the Union forces turned the tide and forced the rebels off the field in what Weaver called a "perfect rout". The carnage at Shiloh (some 20,000 killed and wounded on both sides) was on a scale never before seen in American warfare, and both sides learned that the war would end neither quickly nor easily.

After Shiloh, Weaver and the 2nd Iowa slowly advanced to Corinth, Mississippi, where he was promoted to major. Rebel forces attacked the Union armies there in the Second Battle of Corinth, where Weaver's courage in that Union victory convinced his superiors to promote him to colonel after the regiment's commanding officer was killed. After Corinth, Weaver's unit took up garrison duty in northern Mississippi. In the summer of 1863 they were redeployed to the Tennessee–Alabama border, again on occupation duty around Pulaski, Tennessee. They rejoined the action at the Battle of Resaca, a part of the Atlanta campaign, then continued with Major General William Tecumseh Sherman's march through Georgia to the sea in 1864. Weaver's enlistment ended in May 1864, and he returned to his family in Iowa. On October 12, 1864, he would be selected to lead a local militia in Davis County after it was reported that Confederate partisans were actively raiding the area. He remained in command of the militia until November 7 when the partisans surrendered. After the war ended Weaver received a promotion to brevet brigadier general, backdated to March 13, 1865. (Note: Weaver was one of many Union officers granted retroactive brevet promotions after the war ended as a reward for their service. Weaver was nominated for the appointment, to rank from March 13, 1865, by President Andrew Johnson on February 24, 1866, and the United States Senate confirmed the appointment on April 10, 1866.)

== Republican politics ==
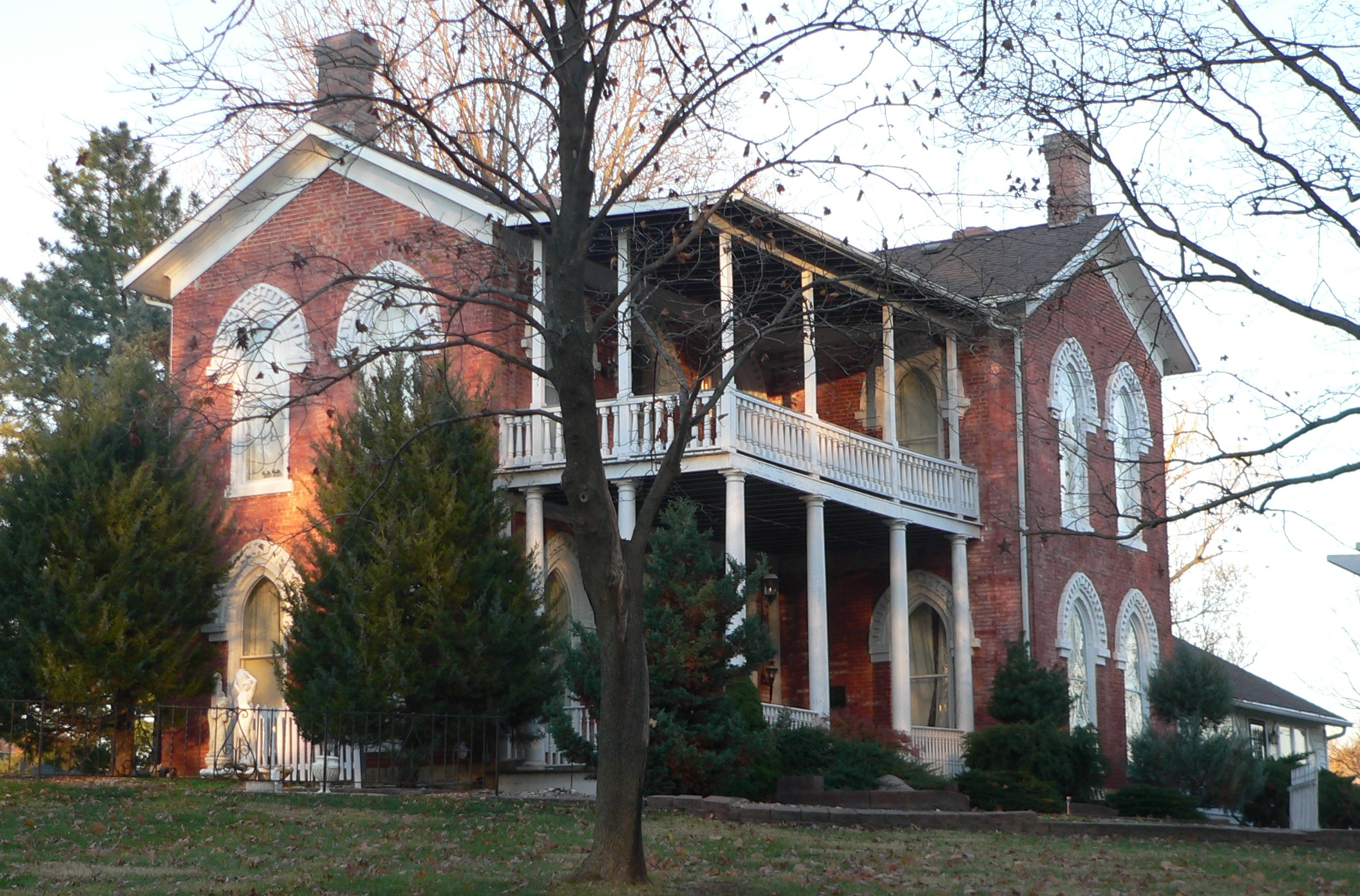
Weaver's home, built in 1867 in Bloomfield

Soon after returning from the war Weaver became editor of a pro-Republican Bloomfield newspaper, the Weekly Union Guard. At the 1865 Iowa Republican State Convention, he placed second for the nomination for lieutenant governor. The following year, Weaver was elected district attorney for the second judicial district, covering six counties in southern Iowa. In 1867, President Andrew Johnson appointed him assessor of internal revenue in the first Congressional district, which extended across southeastern Iowa. The job came with a $1500 salary, plus a percentage of taxes collected over $100,000. Weaver held that lucrative position until 1872, when Congress abolished it. He also became involved in the Methodist Episcopal Church, serving as a delegate to a church convention in Baltimore in 1876. Membership in the Methodist church coincided with Weaver's interest in the growing movement for prohibition of the sale and consumption of alcoholic beverages. His income and prestige grew along with his family, which included seven children by 1877. Weaver's success allowed him to build a large new home for his family, which still stands.

Weaver's work for the party led many to support his nomination to represent Iowa's 6th congressional district in the federal House of Representatives in 1874. Many party insiders, however, were wary of Weaver's association with the Prohibition movement and preferred to remain uncommitted on the divisive issue. At the convention, Weaver led on the first ballot, but ultimately lost the nomination by one vote to Ezekiel S. Sampson, a local judge. Weaver's allies attributed his loss to "the meanest kind of wire pulling", but Weaver shrugged off the defeat and aimed instead at the gubernatorial nomination in 1875. He launched a vigorous effort, courted delegates around the state, and explicitly endorsed Prohibition and greater state control of railroad rates. Weaver attracted many delegates' support, but alienated those who were friendly to the railroads and wished to avoid the liquor issue. Opposition was scattered among several lesser-known candidates, mostly members of Senator William B. Allison's conservative wing of the party. They united at the convention when a delegate unexpectedly nominated former governor Kirkwood. The nomination carried easily and, after Allison's associates persuaded him to accept it, Kirkwood was nominated, and went on to win the election. In a further defeat, the delegates refused to endorse Prohibition in the party platform. Weaver had small consolation in a nomination to the state Senate, but he lost to his Democratic opponent in the election that fall.

== Switch to the Greenback Party ==
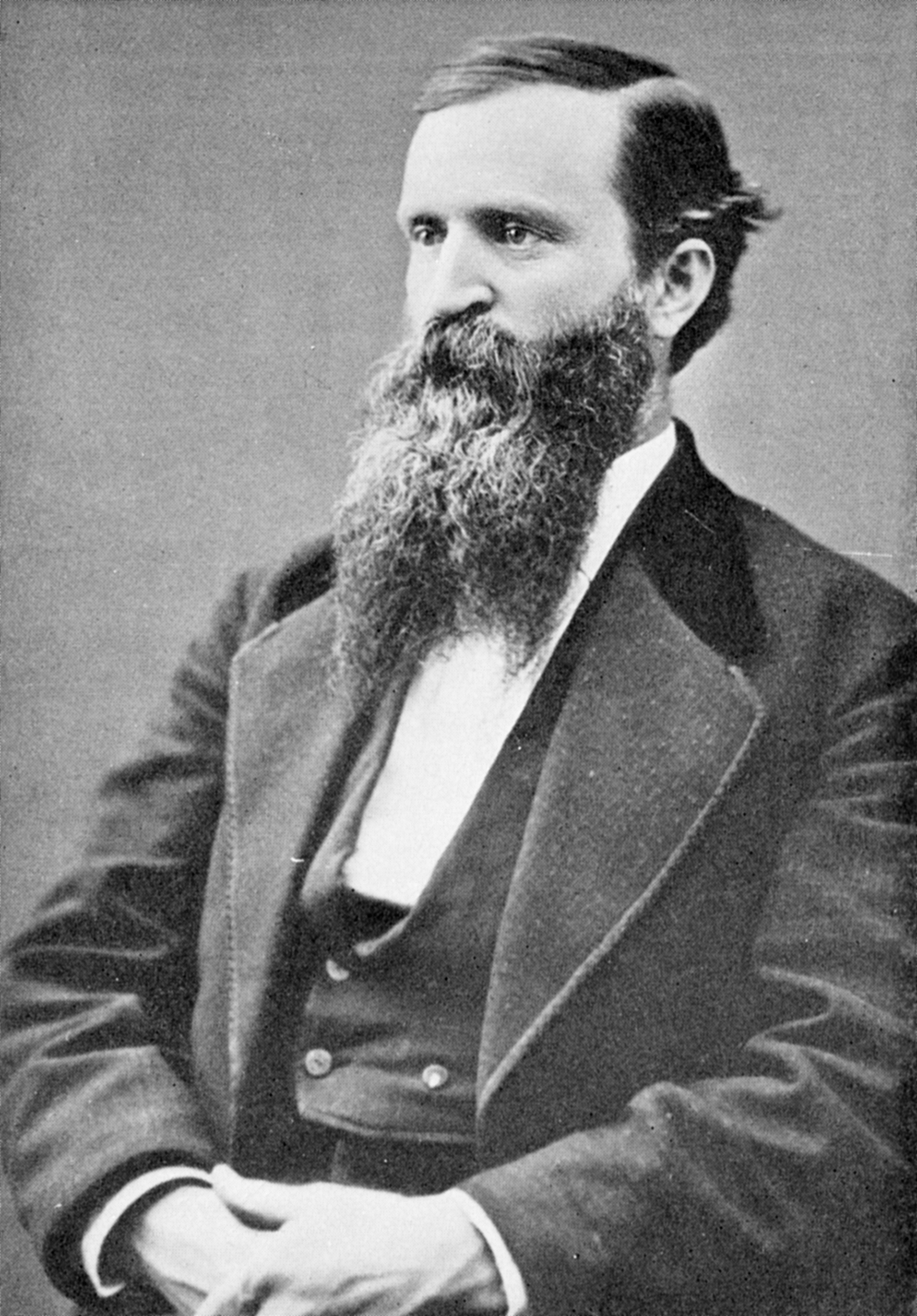
Weaver as a candidate for Congress, 1878

After his defeats in 1875, Weaver grew disenchanted with the Republican party, not only because it had spurned him, but also because of the policy choices of the dominant Allison faction. In May 1876, he traveled to Indianapolis to attend the national convention of the newly formed Greenback Party. The new party had arisen, mostly in the West, as a response to the economic depression that followed the Panic of 1873. During the Civil War, Congress had authorized "greenbacks", a new form of fiat money that was redeemable not in gold but in government bonds. The greenbacks had helped to finance the war when the government's gold supply did not keep pace with the expanding costs of maintaining the armies. When the crisis had passed, many in both parties, especially in the East, wanted to place the nation's currency on a gold standard as soon as possible. The Specie Payment Resumption Act, passed in 1875, ordered that greenbacks be gradually withdrawn and replaced with gold-backed currency beginning in 1879. At the same time, the depression had made it more expensive for debtors to pay debts they had contracted when currency was less valuable. Beyond their support for a larger money supply, Greenbackers also favored an eight-hour work day, safety regulations in factories, an end to child labor, and the end of wage slavery. As historian Herbert Clancy put it, they "anticipated by almost fifty years the progressive legislation of the first quarter of the twentieth century".

In the 1876 presidential campaign, the Republicans nominated Rutherford B. Hayes and the Democrats chose Samuel J. Tilden. Both candidates opposed the issuance of more greenbacks (candidates who favored the gold-backed currency were called "hard money" supporters, while the Greenbackers' policy of encouraging inflation was known as "soft money".) Weaver was impressed with the Greenbackers and their candidate, Peter Cooper, but while he advocated some soft-money policies, he declined the Greenback nomination for Congress and remained a Republican; he campaigned for Hayes in the election that year. In 1877, Weaver attended the Republican state convention and saw the state party adopt a soft-money platform that also favored Prohibition. The gubernatorial nominee, however, was John H. Gear, an opponent of Prohibition who had worked to defeat Weaver in his quest for the governorship two years earlier. After initially supporting Gear, Weaver joined the Greenback party in August. He gave speeches on behalf of his new party, debated former allies across the state, and establishing himself as a prominent advocate for the Greenback cause.

== Congress ==
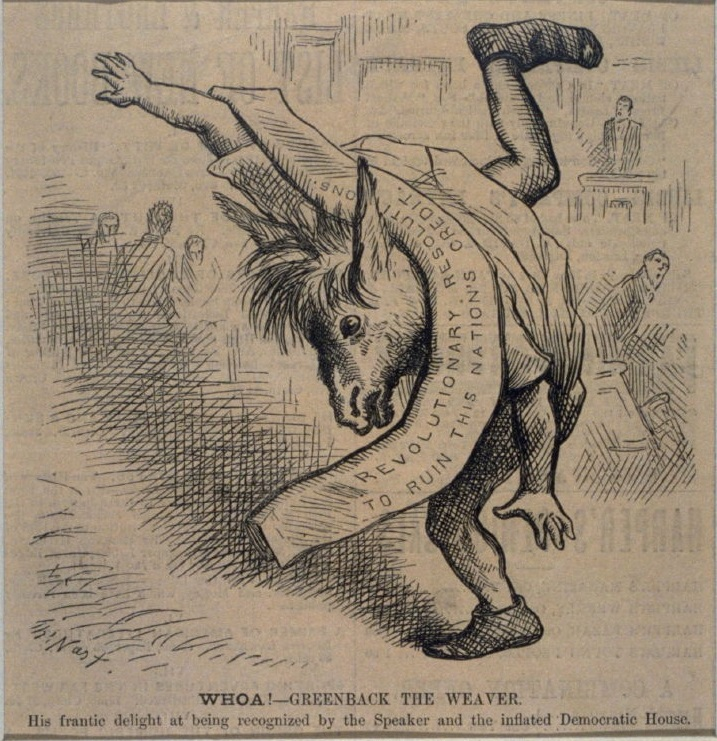
Thomas Nast depicts Weaver as an ungainly donkey who is finally recognized by Speaker Samuel J. Randall.

In May 1878, Weaver accepted the Greenback nomination for the House of Representatives in the 6th district. Although Weaver's political career up to then had been as a staunch Republican, Democrats in the 6th district thought that endorsing him was likely the only way to defeat Sampson, the incumbent Republican. Since the start of the Civil War, Democrats had been in the minority across Iowa; electoral fusion with Greenbackers represented their best chance to get their candidates into office. Hard-money Democrats objected to the idea, but some were reassured when Henry Hoffman Trimble assured them that if elected Weaver would align with House Democrats on all issues other than the money question. Democrats declined to endorse any candidate at the 6th district convention, but soft-money leaders in the party circulated their own slate of candidates that included Democrats and Greenbackers. The Greenback–Democrat ticket prevailed, and Weaver was elected with 16,366 votes to Sampson's 14,307.

Weaver entered the 46th Congress in March 1879, one of thirteen Greenbackers elected in 1878. Although the House was closely divided, neither major party included the Greenbackers in their caucus, leaving them few committee assignments and little input on legislation. Weaver gave his first speech in April 1879, criticizing the use of the army to police Southern polling stations, while also decrying the violence against black Southerners that made such protection necessary; he then described the Greenback platform, which he said would put an end to the sectional and economic strife. The next month, he spoke in favor of a bill calling for an increase in the money supply by allowing the unlimited coinage of silver, but the bill was easily defeated. Weaver's oratorical skill drew praise, but he had no luck in advancing Greenback policy ideas.

In 1880, Weaver prepared a resolution stating that the government, not banks, should issue currency and determine its volume, and that the federal debt should be repaid in whatever currency the government chose, not just gold as the law then required. The proposed resolution would never be allowed to emerge from committees dominated by Democrats and Republicans, so Weaver planned to introduce it directly to the whole House for debate, as members were permitted to do every Monday. Rather than debate a proposition that would expose the monetary divide in the Democratic Party, Speaker Samuel J. Randall refused to recognize Weaver when he rose to propose the resolution. Weaver returned to the floor each succeeding Monday, with the same result, and the press took notice of Randall's obstruction. Eventually, Republican James A. Garfield of Ohio interceded with Randall to recognize Weaver, which he reluctantly did on April 5, 1880. The Republicans, mostly united behind hard money, largely voted against the measure, while many Democrats joined the Greenbackers voting in favor. Despite support by the soft-money Democrats, the resolution was defeated 84–117 with many members abstaining. Although he lost the vote, Weaver had promoted the monetary issue in the national consciousness.

== Presidential election of 1880 ==
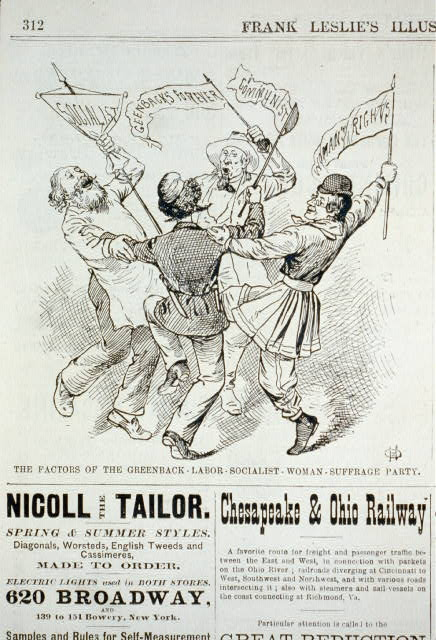
An 1880 cartoon in Frank Leslie's Illustrated Newspaper ridicules the Greenback party as a collection of disparate radicals.

By 1879, the Greenback coalition had divided, with the faction most prominent in the South and West, led by Marcus M. "Brick" Pomeroy, splitting from the main party. Pomeroy's faction, called the "Union Greenback Labor Party", was more radical and emphasized its independence, and suggested that Eastern Greenbackers were likely to "sell out the party at any time to the Democrats". Weaver remained with the rump Greenback party, often called the "National Greenback Party", and the national reputation he had earned in Congress made him one of the party's leading presidential hopefuls.

The Union Greenbackers held their convention first and nominated Stephen D. Dillaye of New Jersey for president and Barzillai J. Chambers of Texas for vice president, but also sent a delegation to the National Greenback convention in Chicago that June, with an eye toward reuniting the party. The two factions agreed to reunify, and also to admit a delegation from the Socialist Labor Party. Thus united, the convention turned to nominations. Weaver led on the first ballot, and on the second he secured a majority. Chambers won the convention's vote for vice president.

In a departure from the political traditions of the day, Weaver himself campaigned, making speeches across the South in July and August. As the Greenbackers had the only ticket that included a Southerner, Weaver and Chambers hoped to make inroads in the South. As the campaign progressed, however, Weaver's message of racial inclusion drew violent protests in the South, as the Greenbackers faced the same obstacles the Republicans did in the face of increasing black disenfranchisement. In the autumn Weaver campaigned in the North, but the Greenbackers' lack of support was compounded by Weaver's refusal to run a fusion ticket in states where Democratic and Greenbacker strength might have combined to outvote the Republicans.

Weaver received 305,997 votes and no electoral votes, compared to 4,446,158 for the winner, Republican James A. Garfield, and 4,444,260 for Democrat Winfield Scott Hancock. The party was strongest in the West and South, but in no state did Weaver receive more than 12 percent of the vote (his best state was Texas, with 11.7 percent); his nationwide total was just 3 percent. That figure represented an improvement over the Greenback vote of 1876, but to Weaver, who expected twice as many votes as he received, it was a disappointment.

== Office-seeker and party promoter ==
After the election Weaver returned to the lame-duck session of Congress and proposed an unsuccessful constitutional amendment that would have provided for the direct election of Senators. (Note: Before the passage of the Seventeenth Amendment to the United States Constitution in 1913 Senators were chosen by their states' legislatures.) After his term expired in March, he resumed his speaking tour, promoting the Greenback Party across the nation. He and Edward H. Gillette, another Iowa Greenback Congressman, bought the Iowa Tribune in 1882 to help spread the Greenback message. That same year, Weaver ran for his old 6th district seat in the House against the incumbent Republican, Marsena E. Cutts. This time the Democrats and Greenbackers ran separate candidates, and Weaver finished a distant second. Cutts died before taking office, and the Republicans offered to let Weaver run unopposed in the special election if he rejoined their party; he declined, and John C. Cook, a Democrat, won the seat.

In 1883, Weaver was the Greenback nominee for governor of Iowa. Again, the Democrats ran a separate candidate and the incumbent Republican, Buren R. Sherman, was re-elected with a plurality. Weaver was a delegate to the 1884 Greenback National Convention in Indianapolis and supported the eventual nominee, Benjamin Butler of Massachusetts. Back in Iowa, Weaver again ran for the House, this time with the Democrats' support. Greenback fortunes declined nationally, as Butler received just over half as many votes for president as Weaver had four years earlier. Weaver's House race bucked the trend: he defeated Republican Frank T. Campbell by just 67 votes.

== Return to Congress ==
Unlike in his previous congressional term, when Weaver entered the 49th United States Congress, he was the only Greenback member. The new president, Democrat Grover Cleveland, was friendly to Weaver, and asked his advice on Iowa patronage. As it had been for years, Weaver's chief concern was with the nation's money and finance, and the relationship between labor and capital.

In 1885, Weaver proposed the creation of a Department of Labor, which he suggested would find a solution to disputes between labor and management. (Note: In 1903 Congress did create a Department of Commerce and Labor; in 1913 a separate Department of Labor was created.) Labor tensions increased the following year as the Knights of Labor went on strike against Jay Gould's rail empire, and a strike against the McCormick Harvesting Machine Company ended in the bloody Haymarket riot. Weaver believed the nation's hard-money policies were responsible for labor unrest, calling it "purely a question of money, and nothing else" and declaring, "If this Congress will not protect labor, it must protect itself". He saw the triumph of one plank of the Greenback platform when Congress established the Interstate Commerce Commission to regulate the railroads. Weaver thought the bill should have given the government more power, including the ability to set rates directly, but he voted for the final bill.

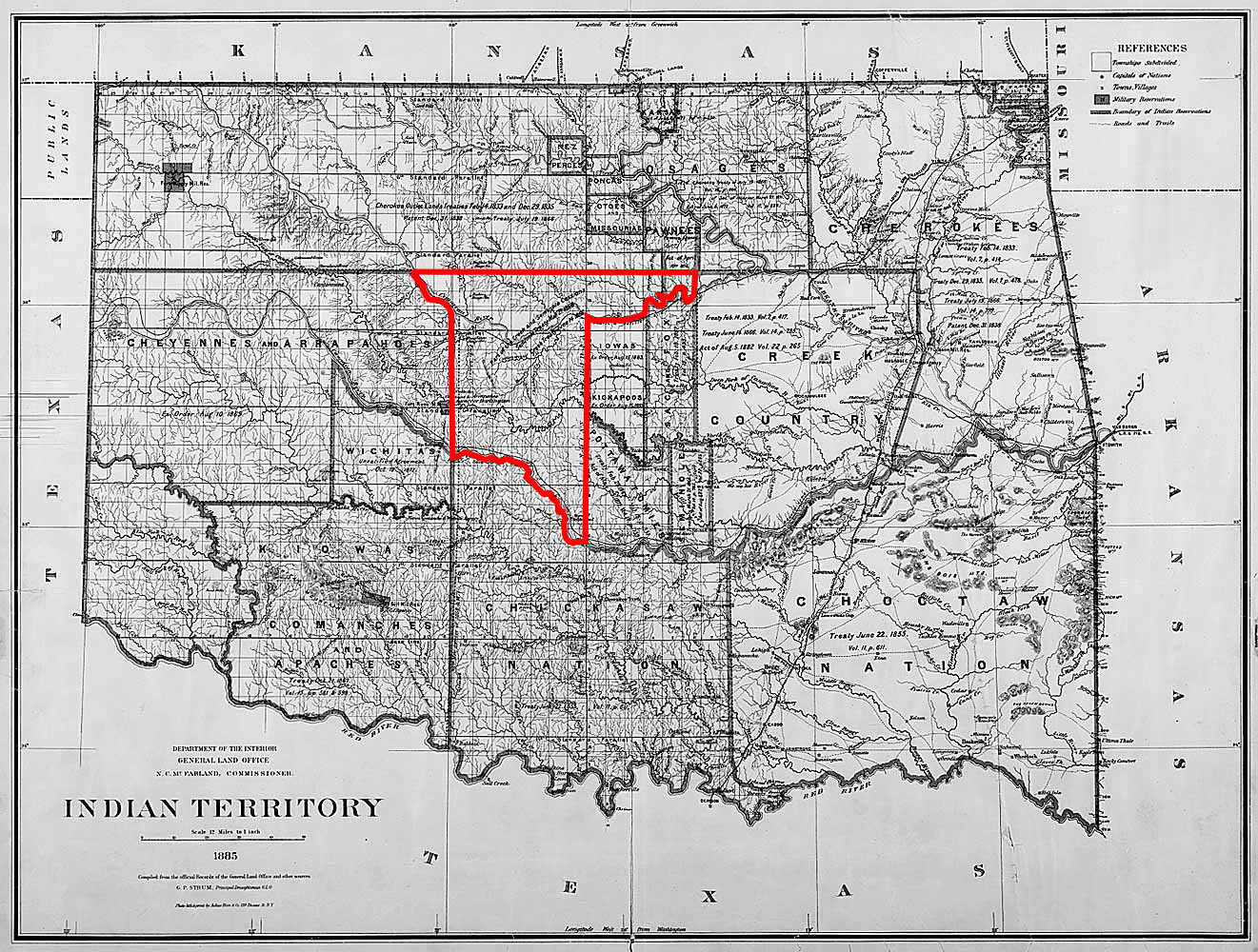
Weaver supported white settlers' right to homesteads in the Unassigned Lands.

Weaver also took up the issue of white settlement in Indian Territory. For several years, white settlers had been claiming homesteads in the Unassigned Lands in what is now Oklahoma. After the Civil War. the Five Civilized Tribes had been forced to cede their unused western lands to the federal government. The settlers, known as Boomers, believed that federal ownership made the lands open to settlement under the Homestead Acts. The federal government disagreed, as did the Cherokee Nation, which leased its neighboring Cherokee Outlet to Kansas cattle ranchers, and many Easterners, who believed the Boomers to be the tools of railroad interests. Weaver saw the issue as one between the landless poor homesteaders and wealthy cattlemen, and took the side of the former. He introduced a bill in December 1885 to organize Indian Territory and the neighboring Neutral Strip into a new Oklahoma Territory. The bill died in committee, but Weaver reintroduced it in February 1886 and gave a speech calling for the Indian reservations to be broken up into homesteads for individual Natives and the remaining land to be open to white settlement.

The Committee on Territories again rejected Weaver's bill, but approved a compromise measure that opened the Unassigned Lands, Cherokee Outlet, and Neutral Strip to settlement. Congress debated the bill over several months, while the tribes announced their resistance to their lands becoming a territory; according to an 1884 Supreme Court decision, Elk v. Wilkins, Native Americans were not citizens, and thus would have no voting rights in the new territory. When Weaver returned to Iowa to campaign for re-election, the bill was still in limbo. Running again on a Democratic–Greenback fusion ticket, Weaver was re-elected to the House in 1886 with a 618-vote majority.

In the lame-duck session of 1887, Congress passed the Dawes Act, which allowed the president to terminate tribal governments, and broke up Indian reservations into homesteads for individual natives. Although the Five Civilized Tribes were exempt from the Act, the spirit of the law encouraged Weaver and the Boomers to continue their own efforts to open western Indian Territory to white settlement. Weaver reintroduced his Oklahoma bill in the new Congress the following year, but again it stalled in committee. He returned to Iowa for another re-election campaign in September 1888, but the Greenback party had fallen apart, replaced by a new left-wing third party, the Union Labor Party. In Iowa's 6th district, the new party agreed to fuse with Democrats to nominate Weaver, but this time the Republicans were stronger. Their candidate, John F. Lacey, was elected with an 828-vote margin. The Union Laborites and their presidential candidate, Alson Streeter, fared poorly nationally as well, and the new party soon dissolved. Weaver returned to Congress for the lame-duck session and once more pushed to organize the Oklahoma Territory. This time he prevailed, as the House voted 147–102 to open the Unassigned Lands to homesteaders. The Senate followed suit and President Cleveland, who was about to leave office, signed the bill into law.

== Farmers' Alliance and a new party ==
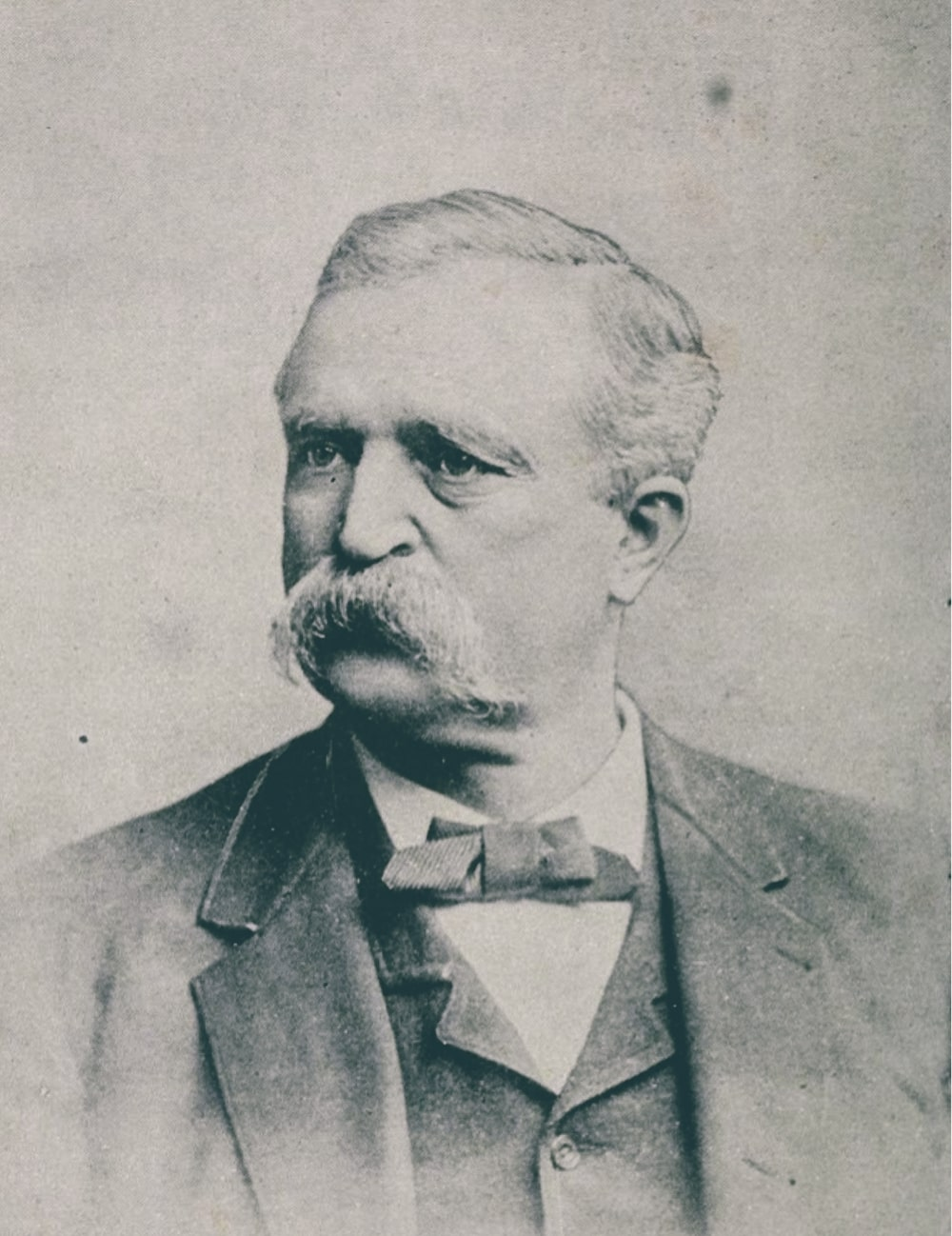
Weaver in 1892

The new president, Republican Benjamin Harrison, set April 22, 1889, as the date when the rush for the Unassigned Lands would begin. Weaver arrived at a railroad station (Note: Oklahoma Station, where the settlers gathered, was the site of the future capital, Oklahoma City.) in the territory in March with an eye toward relocating there. The would-be homesteaders welcomed him with great acclaim. Although settlers were not allowed to stake claims before noon on April 22, many scouted out the land ahead of time, and even marked off informal claims; Weaver was among them. After the rush, settlers who had waited challenged the claims of the "Sooners" who had entered early. Weaver's identification with the group harmed his popularity in the territory. His claim was ultimately denied, and he returned to Iowa in 1890.

Weaver and his wife moved their household in 1890 from Bloomfield to Colfax, near Des Moines, as the former Congressman took up more active management of the Iowa Tribune. The Greenback and Union Labor parties were defunct, but he still proselytized for their ideals. In August 1890, Weaver addressed a convention in Des Moines where former Greenbackers and Laborites gathered, although he declined their nomination for Congress. The economic conditions that had created the Greenback party had not gone away; many farmers and laborers believed their situation had gotten worse since the Long Depression began in 1873. Many farmers had joined the Farmers' Alliance, which sought to promote soft-money ideas on a non-partisan basis; rather than create a third party, they endorsed major party candidates who supported their ideas and hired speakers to educate the public. Alliance-backed candidates did well in the 1890 elections, especially in the South, where Democrats endorsed by the Alliance won 44 seats.

Alliance members gathered that December in Ocala, Florida, and formulated a platform, later called the Ocala Demands, that called for looser money, government control of the railroads, a graduated income tax, and the direct election of senators. Weaver endorsed the message in the Tribune and corresponded with the group's leader, Leonidas L. Polk. Weaver attended the group's convention in Cincinnati in May 1891, where he and Polk argued against forming a third party. Another delegate, Ignatius L. Donnelly, argued forcefully for a break from the two major parties, and his argument carried the day, although Weaver and Polk kept many of Donnelly's more radical proposals out of the convention's statement of principles.

== Presidential election of 1892 ==
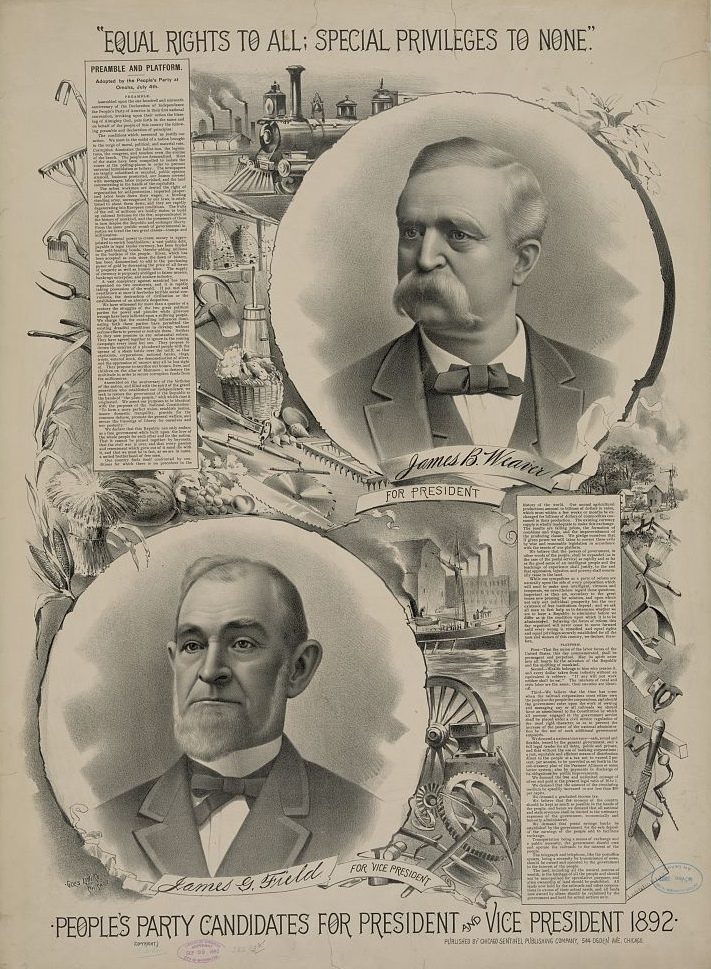
1892 People's Party campaign poster

The following year, Weaver accepted the decision to form a new party (called the People's Party or Populist Party) and published a book, A Call to Action, detailing the party's principles and castigating the "few haughty millionaires who are gathering up the riches of the new world". He attended their convention in Omaha, Nebraska, in July 1892. After Polk's sudden death in June, Weaver was considered the front-runner for the nomination. He was nominated on the first ballot, easily besting his closest rival, Senator James H. Kyle of South Dakota. Weaver accepted the nomination and promised to "visit every state in the Union and carry the banner of the people into the enemy's camp". The vice presidential nomination went to James G. Field, a Confederate veteran and former Attorney General of Virginia.

The platform adopted in Omaha was ambitious for its time, calling for a graduated income tax, public ownership of the railroads, telegraph, and telephone systems, government-issued currency, and the unlimited coinage of silver (the idea that the United States would buy as much silver as miners could sell the government and strike it into coins) at a favorable 16-to-1 ratio with gold. The Republicans nominated Harrison for re-election, and the Democrats put forward ex-President Cleveland; as in 1880, Weaver was confident of a good showing for the new party against their opponents. Harrison had shown some favor to the free silver cause, but his party largely supported the hard-money gold standard; Cleveland was solidly for gold, but his running mate, Adlai Stevenson of Illinois, was a silverite. Against these, the Populist Party stood alone as undisputed partisans of soft money, which Weaver hoped would lead to success in rural areas. Further, as labor disturbances broke out in Homestead, Pennsylvania, and elsewhere, Weaver hoped urban laborers would rally to the Populist cause.

Weaver embarked on a speaking tour across the northern plains and Pacific coast states. In late August he turned South, hoping to break the Democrats' grip on those states. As in 1880, the issue of race hurt Weaver among white Southern voters, as he sought to attract black voters by urging cooperation between white and black farmers and calling for an end to lynchings. Weaver drew good crowds in the South, but he and his wife were also subjected to abuse from hecklers. Southern Democrats depicted Weaver as a threat to the conservative Democrats in power there; with the increasing disenfranchisement of black voters, this was to prove fatal to the Populists' hopes in the South.

On election day, Cleveland triumphed, carrying the entire South and many Northern states. Weaver's performance was better than that of any third-party candidate since the Civil War, (Note: Since Weaver only Theodore Roosevelt in 1912, Robert M. La Follette, Sr. in 1924, George Wallace in 1968 and Ross Perot in 1992 have exceeded his vote share as a third-party candidate.) as he won over a million votes – 8.5 percent of the total cast nationwide. In four states, he won a plurality, giving the Populists the electoral votes of Colorado, Idaho, Kansas, and Nevada along with two more votes from North Dakota and Oregon: twenty-two in total. Weaver believed the performance "a surprising success", and thought it portended good results in future elections. "Unaided by money," he said afterward, "our grand young party has made an enviable record and achieved a surprising success at the polls."

== Populist elder statesman ==
Weaver believed that the Populists' embrace of free silver would be the main issue to attract new members to the party. After the election he attended a meeting of the American Bimetallic League, a pro-silver group, and gave speeches advocating an inflationist monetary policy. Meanwhile the Panic of 1893 caused bank failures, factory closures, and general economic upheaval. As the federal gold reserves dwindled, President Cleveland convinced Congress to repeal the Sherman Silver Purchase Act, which ensured the government would purchase less silver for coining and which further disconcerted free silver supporters. While depletion of gold reserves slowed after the repeal, the country's economy still floundered.

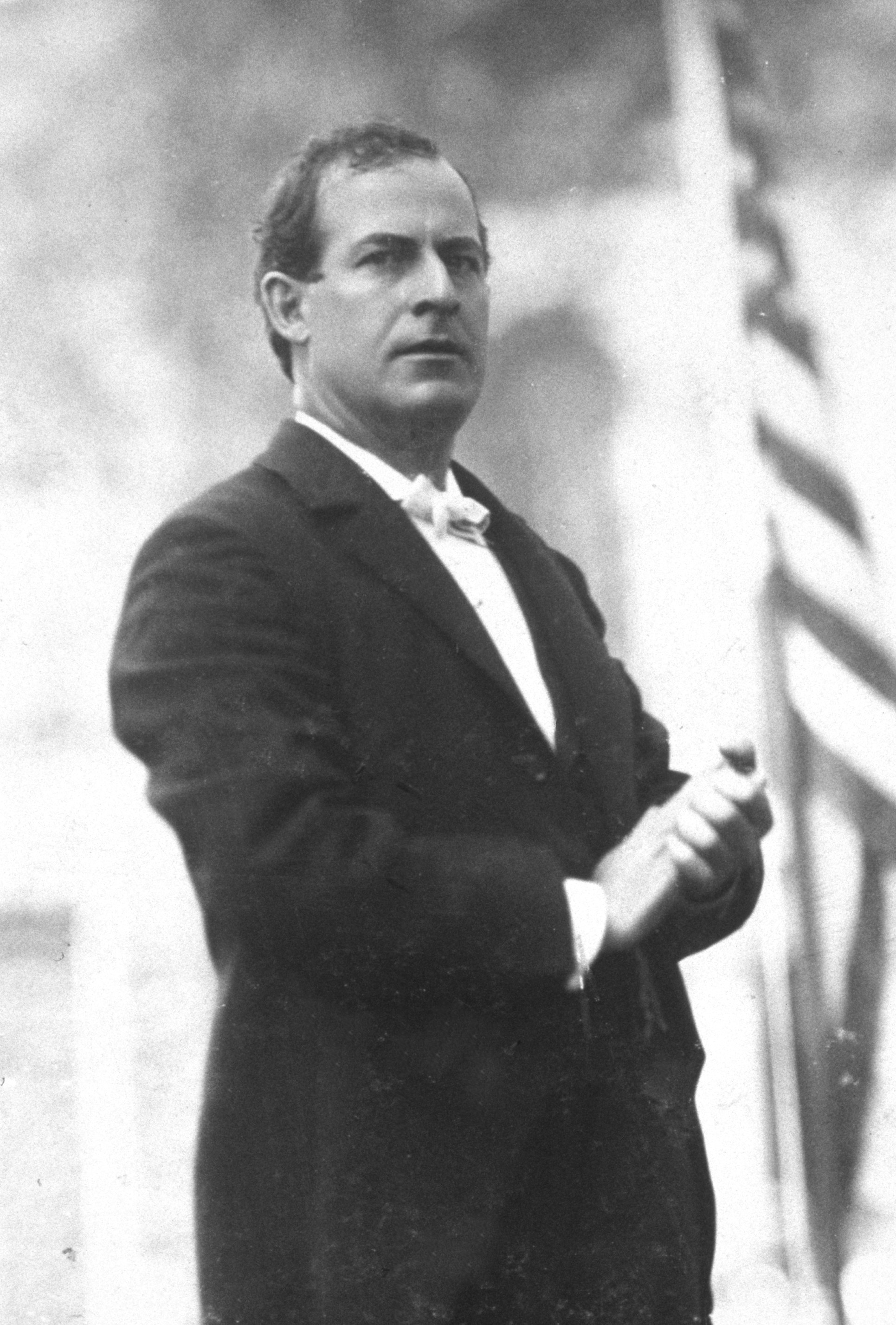
Weaver supported Democrat William Jennings Bryan for president in 1896.

The next year, 1894, saw pay cuts and labor disturbances, including a massive strike by the workers at the Pullman Company. A group of unemployed workers, known as Coxey's Army, marched on Washington that spring. Weaver met with them in Iowa and expressed sympathy with the movement, so long as they refrained from lawbreaking. He then returned to the campaign trail, stumping for Populist candidates in the 1894 midterm elections. The election proved disastrous for the Democrats, but most of the gains went to the Republicans rather than to the Populists, who gained a few seats in the South but lost ground in the West. During the election, Weaver became friendly with William Jennings Bryan, a Democratic Congressman from Nebraska and a charismatic supporter of free silver. Bryan had lost his bid for the Senate in the election, but his reputation as an exciting speaker made him a presidential possibility in 1896.

Weaver privately supported Bryan's quest for the Democratic nomination in 1896, which their convention awarded him on the fifth ballot. When the Populist convention gathered the next month in Chicago, they divided between endorsing the silverite Democrat and preserving their new party's independence. Weaver backed the former course, holding the issues the party stood for to be of more importance than the party itself. A majority of delegates agreed, but without the enthusiasm that had marked their convention of four years earlier. (Note: Rather than endorse the Democratic vice presidential candidate, the Populists nominated one of their own, former Congressman Thomas E. Watson of Georgia.) At the same time, Weaver joined with anti-fusionists to keep the Populist platform from deviating from the party's ideological principles. Against the fusion candidate stood Republican William McKinley of Ohio, a hard-money conservative. Bryan succeeded in uniting the South and West, Weaver's longtime dream, but with the more populous North solidly behind McKinley, Bryan lost the election.

Despite the loss, Weaver still believed the Populist cause would triumph. He agreed to be nominated one last time for his old 6th district House seat on a Democratic-Populist fusion ticket. As he had ten years earlier, Republican John Lacey defeated Weaver. In 1900 Weaver attended a convention of fusionist Populists in Sioux Falls, South Dakota, the party having split on the issue of cooperation with the Democrats. The fusionists backed Bryan, the Democratic nominee, but he lost again to McKinley, this time by a greater margin. The following year, Weaver was elected to office for the last time as the mayor of his hometown, Colfax, Iowa, after defeating Republican P. H. Cragen and served in that position until 1903.

== Later years and death ==
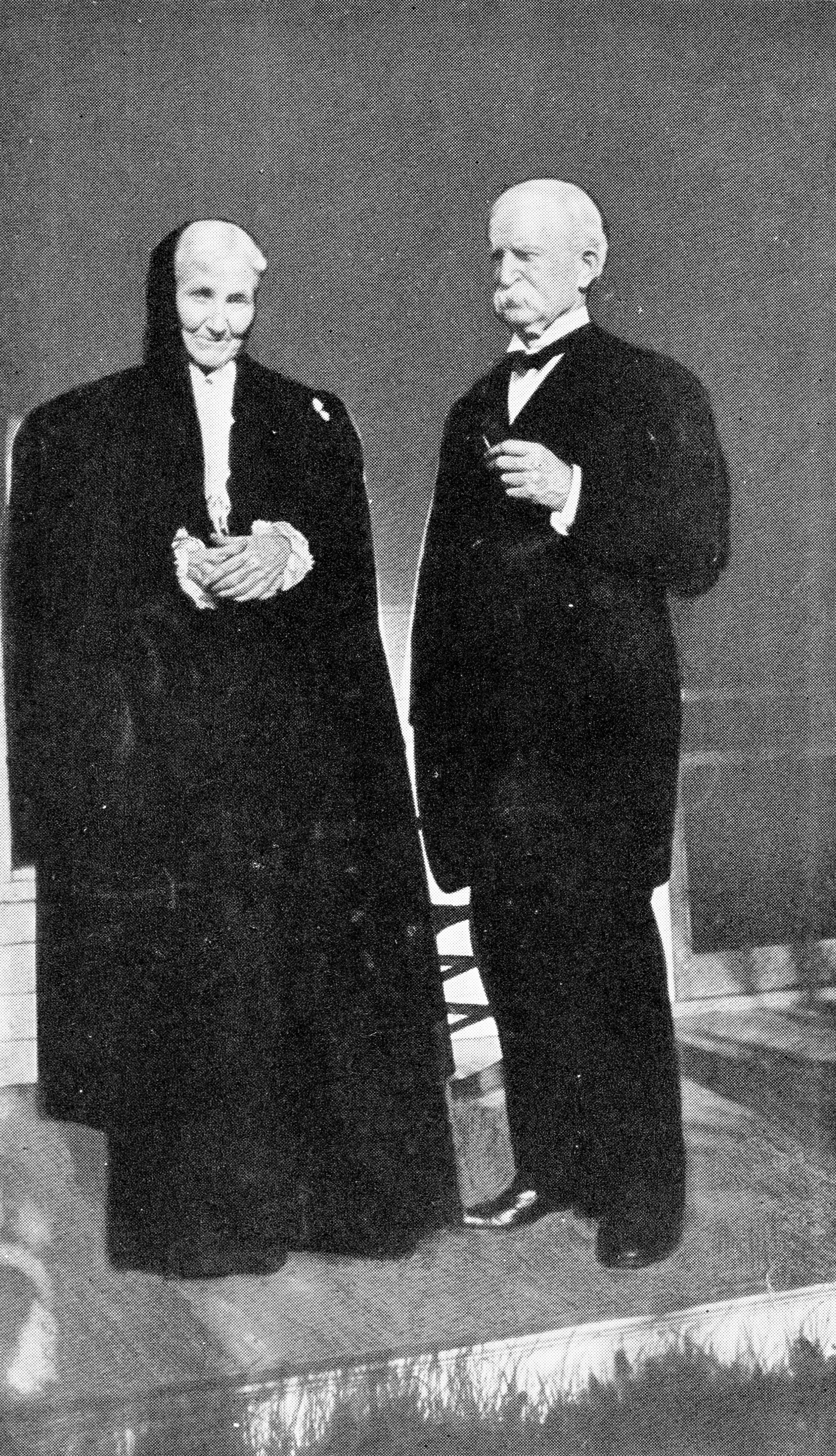
James and Clara Weaver in 1908

The Republican Party's popularity after the victory in the Spanish–American War led Weaver, for the first time, to doubt that populist values would eventually prevail. With the demise of the Populist Party, Weaver became a Democrat and was a delegate to the 1904 Democratic National Convention. He was displeased at the party's nominee, Alton B. Parker, whom he thought "plutocratic", but Weaver supported his unsuccessful campaign nevertheless. He gave serious consideration to running for the House again that year; however, he decided against it. In 1908, he supported Bryan's third campaign as the Democratic nominee for president, but it, too, was unsuccessful.

That same year, Weaver and his wife, Clara, celebrated their fiftieth wedding anniversary, surrounded by six of their children. The Iowa legislature honored him in 1909 and hung a portrait of him in the Iowa State Historical Building. He wrote a history of Jasper County, Iowa, where he lived, which was published in 1912. Weaver planned to campaign on behalf of Democratic candidates that year but did not have the chance. On February 6, he died of heart failure at his daughter's house in Des Moines after being sick for ten days. After a funeral at the First Methodist Church in Des Moines, Weaver was buried in that city's Woodland Cemetery. The last letter he wrote was an endorsement of Speaker of the House Champ Clark for the Democratic presidential nomination; however, Clark went on to lose the nomination to Woodrow Wilson.

== Legacy ==
Many of Iowa's leading statesmen, including Weaver's former adversaries, praised him at his funeral and in the years thereafter. Fusion with the Democrats had brought Populist policy into the mainstream, and several of the policies for which Weaver fought became law after his death, including the direct election of senators, a graduated income tax, and a monetary policy not based on the gold standard; others, such as public ownership of the railroads and telephone companies, were never enacted.

In a 2008 biography, Robert B. Mitchell wrote that "Weaver's legacy cannot be assessed using conventional measures", as much of what he fought for did not come to pass until after his death. Even so, Mitchell credits Weaver for beginning the political effort that led to those changes: "Weaver's most important legacy in national politics is not what he advocated, or how subsequent reforms worked, but his effect on America's continuing political conversation."

== Sources ==
Books

- Ackerman, Kenneth D. (2003). Dark Horse: The Surprise Election and Political Murder of President James A. Garfield. New York, New York: Carroll & Graf. ISBN 0-7867-1151-5.
- Clancy, Herbert J. (1958). The Presidential Election of 1880. Chicago, Illinois: Loyola University Press. ISBN 978-1-258-19190-0.
- Goodwyn, Lawrence (1978). The Populist Moment: A Short History of the Agrarian Revolt in America. New York, New York: Galaxy Books. ISBN 0-19-502417-6.
- Haynes, Frederick Emory (1919). James Baird Weaver. Iowa City, Iowa: The State Historical Society of Iowa. ISBN 9780722248188. OCLC 3733204.
- Lause, Mark A. (2001). The Civil War's Last Campaign: James B. Weaver, the Greenback-Labor Party & the Politics of Race and Section. Lanham, Maryland: University Press of America. ISBN 0-7618-1917-7.
- McPherson, James M. (1988). Battle Cry of Freedom: The Civil War Era. New York, New York: Ballantine Books. ISBN 0-345-35942-9.
- Mitchell, Robert B. (2008). Skirmisher: The Life, Times, and Political Career of James B. Weaver. Roseville, Minnesota: Edinborough Press. ISBN 978-1-889020-26-6.
- Unger, Irwin (1964). The Greenback Era: A Social and Political History of American Finance, 1865–1879. Princeton, New Jersey: Princeton University Press. ISBN 0-691-04517-8.
- Weaver, James Baird (1892). A Call to Action: An Interpretation of the Great Uprising, Its Source and Causes. Des Moines, Iowa: Iowa Printing Co. OCLC 647058228.

Articles

- Colbert, Thomas Burnell (Spring 1978). "Political Fusion in Iowa: The Election of James B. Weaver to Congress in 1878". Arizona and the West. 20 (1): 25–40. JSTOR 40168674.
- Colbert, Thomas Burnell (Autumn 2008). "The Lion of the Land: James B. Weaver, Kansas, and the Oklahoma lands. 1884–1890" (PDF). Kansas History. 31 (3): 176–193.
- Doolen, Richard M. (Winter 1972). ""Brick" Pomeroy and the Greenback Clubs". Journal of the Illinois State Historical Society. 65 (4): 434–450. JSTOR 40191206.
- Newcombe, Alfred W. (March 1946). "Alson J. Streeter: An Agrarian Liberal". Journal of the Illinois State Historical Society. 39 (1): 68–95. JSTOR 40188188.

U.S. House of Representatives
Preceded by Ezekiel S. Sampson	Member of the U.S. House of Representatives from Iowa's 6th congressional district 1879–1881	Succeeded by Marsena E. Cutts
Preceded by John C. Cook	Member of the U.S. House of Representatives from Iowa's 6th congressional district 1885–1889	Succeeded by John F. Lacey
Party political offices
Preceded by Peter Cooper	Greenback nominee for President of the United States; 1880	Succeeded by Benjamin Butler
Preceded by David M. Clark	Greenback nominee for Governor of Iowa; 1883	Succeeded by Elias Doty
New political party	Populist nominee for President of the United States; 1892	Succeeded by William Jennings Bryan; Endorsed
Political offices
Preceded by Phineas Cragan	Mayor of Colfax; 1901–1903	Succeeded by John Hahn
