= Stephen D. Dillaye =

American lawyer (1820–1884)

Stephen Devalson Dillaye (August 31, 1820 – October 3, 1884) was an American lawyer, author, and politician. In 1880, he was briefly the presidential nominee of the Union Greenback Labor Party.

== Early life and family ==
Dillaye was born in 1820 in Plymouth, New York, the son of René and Clarissa Dillaye. He graduated from Harvard University in 1845 with a Bachelor of Laws degree. In 1848, he married Charlotte Malcolm, but not before executing a prenuptial agreement that later became the subject of litigation. Dillaye and Charlotte had three daughters, including Blanche, who became an artist in the school of Thomas Eakins.

== Political career ==
By 1852, he was residing in New York City, where he was engaged in the practice of law. Dillaye became active in Democratic politics in the city, addressing a local convention of Manhattan Democrats in 1857. As the sectional differences that led to the Civil War grew, Dillaye joined (and was later president of) the Young Men's Democratic Union Club. He was appointed to the post of General Appraiser, a patronage position in the New York Custom House in 1856, but differences with the administration and Congressman Daniel Sickles led to his removal two years later. He wrote to Treasury Secretary Howell Cobb to protest his removal and had the letter published in New York Times, but to no avail. The bad feelings continued after Dillaye's removal from office. When he met former congressman Emanuel B. Hart, a Sickles ally, in the street later that year, the two men began to argue and Hart struck Dillaye in the head with his cane.

The next year, 1859, Dillaye was arrested in Pittsburgh, charged with forging certificates of deposit to purchase shares of stock in a bank there. He claimed to have been an innocent victim of the deception, and his explanation convinced the bank officers; the charges were dropped and Dillaye was later elected an officer of the bank. He later published a pamphlet about the incident. The New York Times suggested that Dillaye had only been charged at all because of the machinations of his political enemies.

Dillaye continued his legal career in New York in the 1860s, including filing suit against Hart for damages from their 1858 altercation. The court eventually award Dillaye a verdict of $2,000. He returned to upstate New York and practiced law in Syracuse for several years. While there, he addressed an 1869 county convention with an argument in favor of women's suffrage. In the 1870s, Dillaye relocated to Trenton, New Jersey and worked for the Irish World as a journalist in addition to continuing his legal practice.

== Greenback politics ==
His feuds with the leadership of the New York Democratic Party foreclosed any further advancement in the party, but Dillaye found a new political home in the Greenback Party. The party was a newcomer to the political scene, having arisen as a response to the economic depression that followed the Panic of 1873. During the Civil War, Congress had authorized "greenbacks," a form of money redeemable in government bonds, rather than in gold, as was traditional. After the war, many Democrats and Republicans in the East sought to return to the gold standard, withdrawing greenbacks from circulation. The reduction of currency in circulation, combined with the economic depression, made life harder for debtors, farmers, and industrial laborers; the Greenbackers hoped to draw support from these groups.

The new party suited Dillaye, who had recently authored a book on the monetary structure of revolutionary France. He ran for the New Jersey Senate as a Greenbacker in 1879, but was unsuccessful. By 1880, the Greenback Party had split into two factions. One of them, calling itself the Union Greenback Labor Party, met in St. Louis in March 1880 to nominate candidates for the upcoming presidential election. Dillaye declared he was not interested in nomination, but the delegates nevertheless selected him as their nominee for president and Barzillai J. Chambers, a Texas merchant and surveyor, for vice president.

Because Dillaye had previously declared he was not interested in the nomination, many delegates protested, seeing him as a placeholder for eventual re-unification with the other half of the divided party, the National Greenbackers. Dillaye, himself, supported reunification and urged the delegates to send representatives to the National Greenbackers' convention, which was set for June 1880 in Chicago. The majority agreed with the sentiment, and Union Greenbackers gathered in Chicago along with National Greenbackers as their convention began a few months later. The National Greenbackers agreed to admit them, including Dillaye, and the party was reunified. In the reunified party's presidential nominations, Perry Talbot of Missouri placed Dillaye's name in nomination again; he immediately asked that it be withdrawn. On the first ballot he placed third, with 119 votes, but the nomination went to Congressman James B. Weaver of Iowa. Dillaye's health was poor that year, but he helped with Weaver's campaign, travelling to Indiana on a trip that was rumored to involve fusion negotiations with the Democrats. He also wrote a biographical sketch of Weaver for a book about the presidential candidates.

The Greenback campaign won 3.3% of the vote. Dillaye continued to write on financial topics, authoring a book on monopolies in 1882. His health continued to worsen, and he died in Philadelphia in 1884. He is buried in Oakwood Cemetery in Syracuse.

== Sources ==
Books

- Dillaye, Stephen Devalson (1860). A brief history of the Pittsburgh forgery case. OCLC 495278625.
- Dillaye, Stephen Devalson (1869). Address of Stephen D. Dillaye. OCLC 31645085.
- Dillaye, Stephen Devalson (1877). Assignats and Mandats : A True History. Philadelphia: H.C. Baird. OCLC 16097687.
- Dillaye, Stephen Devalson (1882). Monopolies: Their Origin, Growth, and Development. Philadelphia: H.C. Baird. OCLC 79899215.
- Kennedy, E.B.; Dillaye, S.D.; Hill, Henry (1880). Our Presidential Candidates and Political Compendium. Newark, New Jersey: F.C. Bliss & Co. OCLC 9056547.
- Lause, Mark A. (2001). The Civil War's Last Campaign: James B. Weaver, the Greenback-Labor Party & the Politics of Race and Section. Lanham, Maryland: University Press of America. ISBN 0-7618-1917-7.

Journals

- "University Notes". Harvard University Bulletin. 5 (3). 1889.
- Doolen, Richard M. (Winter 1972). "'Brick' Pomeroy and the Greenback Clubs". Journal of the Illinois State Historical Society. 65 (4): 434–450. JSTOR 40191206.

Newspapers

- "Alleged False Pretenses" (PDF). The New York Times. November 22, 1852.
- "Tammany Troubles" (PDF). The New York Times. August 27, 1857.
- "Political" (PDF). The New York Times. December 9, 1857.
- "Democratic Dissentions" (PDF). The New York Times. June 11, 1858.
- "Democratic Demonstration in Nassau Street" (PDF). The New York Times. July 29, 1858.
- "A New-York Politician in Court" (PDF). The New York Times. September 12, 1859.
- "New-Yorkers abroad: A Prominent Politician on Trial for Forgery". The New York Times. June 28, 1860.
- "Political Persecutions: The Wrongs of Mr. Dillaye". The New York Times. July 25, 1860.
- "The Hart-Dillaye Case: The Jury Disagree". The New York Times. April 20, 1861.
- "General News". The New York Times. November 21, 1862.
- "General Notes" (PDF). The New York Times. March 8, 1880.
- "The Fusion Plan in Indiana" (PDF). The New York Times. October 26, 1880.
