= Sara Andrews Spencer =

American suffragist

Sara Andrews Spencer (21 October 1837—20 October 1909) was an American suffragist.

== Activism ==
In 1876, she was Secretary of the District of Columbia Woman's Franchise Association. That year, the women of Washington, D.C. petitioned Congress asking for the right to vote. In her capacity as Secretary of the DCWFA, Spencer testified before the committees on the District of Columbia of the Senate and House of Representatives.

Later that year, Spencer participated in the women's rights protest at the 1876 Centennial celebration, held in Philadelphia. Along with several other suffrage leaders, Spencer interrupted the proceedings by walking on to the stage and presenting the Declaration of Rights of the Women of the United States to acting Vice President Thomas W. Ferry.

In 1878, Spencer again testified before Congress, this time in opposition to the disenfranchisement of Utah's women by Congress.
