= Irwin Unger =

American historian (1927–2021)

- Born: May 2, 1927; New York City, U.S.
- Died: May 21, 2021 (aged 94)
- Occupations: Historian; academic
- Spouse: Debi Unger
- Awards: Pulitzer Prize for History (1965)

Academic background
- Education: Columbia University (PhD)

Irwin Unger (May 2, 1927 – May 21, 2021) was an American historian and academic specializing in economic history, the history of the 1960s, and the history of the Gilded Age. He earned his Ph.D. from Columbia University in 1958 and was professor emeritus of History at New York University.

== Biography ==
Irwin Unger was born in New York City on May 2, 1927. He was married to author and journalist Debi Unger; they collaborated on several books.

Unger won the Pulitzer Prize for History in 1965 for his book, The Greenback Era. One of his last books, written in collaboration with Stanley Hirshson, a Queens College historian, and Debi Unger, an editor at HarperCollins, is a 2014 biography of George Marshall.

Unger died on May 21, 2021, at the age of 94.

== Books ==
Among Unger's published books are:

- George Marshall, (with Debi Unger and Stanley Hirshson, 2014)
- The Guggenheims: A Family History, (with Debi Unger, 2005)
- LBJ : A Life, (with Debi Unger, 1999)
- The Times Were a Changin': The Sixties Reader (with Debi Unger, 1998)
- The Best of Intentions: The Great Society Programs of Kennedy, Johnson and Nixon (1996)
- Turning Point, 1968, (with Debi Unger, 1988)
- These United States: The Questions of Our Past (1978)
- The Vulnerable Years: The United States, 1896-1917 (1977)
- The Movement: The American New Left 1959-1973 (1973)
- The Greenback Era (1964)

In addition, Unger wrote a number of textbooks on modern American history.
