= The Greenback Era =

History book by Irwin Unger

- First edition
- Author: Irwin Unger
- Language: English
- Genre: Non-fiction
- Publisher: ACLS History E-Book Project and Princeton University Press
- Publication date: 1964
- Publication place: United States
- Pages: 467
- ISBN: 978-1597401685

The Greenback Era: A Social and Political History of American Finance, 1865-1879 is a nonfiction history book by American historian Irwin Unger, published in 1964 by Princeton University Press. It won the 1965 Pulitzer Prize for History. It is about American finance in the post-Civil War period and the social and political elements involved.

The book is based on Unger's PhD dissertation, "Men, money, and politics: the specie resumption issue, 1865-1879" (Columbia University, 1958). It was directed by Professor David Herbert Donald.
