= Kellogg (surname) =

Kellogg is an English surname (originally Kyllehog, a pork butcher) which may refer to:

- Albert Kellogg (1813–1887), American physician and botanist
- Alice De Wolf Kellogg (1862–1900), American artist
- Brainerd Kellogg (1834–1920), American educationalist and writer
- Carolyn Kellogg, American book editor
- Chad Kellogg (1971–2014), American mountain climber
- Charles Kellogg (disambiguation), several people
- Charlotte Kellogg (1874–1960), American author and social activist
- Clara Louise Kellogg (1842–1916), American singer
- Clark Kellogg (born 1961), American sportscaster and former basketball player
- Daniel Kellogg (disambiguation), several people
- Derek Kellogg (born 1973), American basketball coach
- Edward Kellogg (disambiguation), several people
- Ella Eaton Kellogg (1853–1920), American philanthropist and pioneer in dietetics
- Fay Kellogg (1871–1918), American architect
- Francis L. Kellogg (1917–2006), American diplomat and prominent socialite
- Francis W. Kellogg (1810–1879), U.S. Representative from Michigan and Alabama
- Frank B. Kellogg (1856–1937), United States Secretary of State 1925–1929
- Henry T. Kellogg (1869–1942), American judge
- Jeff Kellogg (born 1961), American baseball umpire
- John Kellogg (disambiguation), several people
- Keith Kellogg (born 1944), American government official, retired army general
- Kendrick Bangs Kellogg (born 1934), American organic architect
- Louise P. Kellogg (1862–1942), American historian, writer, and educator
- Lynn Kellogg American singer
- Marjorie Kellogg (1922–2005), American author
- Mark Kellogg (reporter) (1831–1876), American newspaper reporter killed at the Battle of the Little Bighorn
- Mark Kellogg (musician), principal trombonist of the Rochester Philharmonic Orchestra, United States
- Martin Kellogg (1828–1903) Seventh President of the University of California
- Mike Kellogg (American football) (born 1942), American football player
- Milo G. Kellogg, American electrical engineer, founder of Kellogg Switchboard & Supply Company
- Nelson A. Kellogg (1881–1945), American athlete, coach, and administrator
- Orlando Kellogg (1809–1865), U.S. Representative from New York
- Oliver Dimon Kellogg (1878–1932), American mathematician
- Paul Underwood Kellogg (1879–1958), American journalist and social reformer
- Peter Kellogg (born 1942), American businessman and philanthropist
- Ray Kellogg (director) (1905–1976), American film director and producer
- Ray Kellogg (actor) (1919–1981), American film and television actor
- Ray Kellogg (baseball) (1875–1961), American baseball player and coach
- Remington Kellogg (1892–1969), American naturalist, director of the United States National Museum
- Rowland C. Kellogg (1843–1911), New York politician
- Samuel Kellogg (1673–1757), member of the Connecticut House of Representatives from Norwalk
- Samuel H. Kellogg (1839–1899), American Presbyterian missionary in India
- Shem Kellogg (1982–2016), American politician
- Stephen Wright Kellogg (1822–1904), American politician, attorney, military officer, and judge
- Stephen Kellogg of the band Stephen Kellogg and the Sixers
- Steven Kellogg (born 1941), American children's author and illustrator
- Vernon Lyman Kellogg (1867–1937), American entomologist, evolutionary biologist, and science administrator
- Virginia Kellogg (1907–1981), American film writer
- W. K. Kellogg (1860–1951), American industrialist, founder of the Kellogg Company
- William Kellogg (disambiguation), several people
- Winthrop Kellogg (1898–1972), American comparative psychologist

== See also ==
- Justice Kellogg (disambiguation)
