= Roraback =

Roraback is a surname. It is a shortened version of "Rorabacher", a name assumed by a German-speaking family who migrated to New York around 1700 from one of several settlements named "Rohrbach" in Lorraine. Notable people with the surname include:

- Alberto T. Roraback (1849–1923), judge of the Connecticut Supreme Court; brother of political boss J. Henry Roraback
- Andrew Roraback (born 1960), American politician
- Catherine Roraback (1920–2007), civil rights attorney in Connecticut, granddaughter of judge Alberto T. Roraback
- J. Henry Roraback (1870–1937), American Republican political boss and businessman in Connecticut; brother of judge Alberto T. Roraback
