= Kellogg =

Kellogg may refer to:

- Kellogg (surname), including a list of people with the surname
  - Will Keith Kellogg (born William Keith Kellogg; 1860–1951), founder of the US company
  - John Harvey Kellogg (1852–1943), his brother, inventor of cornflakes and medical practitioner

== Organizations ==
- Kellogg's, American multinational food-manufacturing company which split in October 2023
  - Kellanova, acquired in 2025 by Mars Inc.
  - WK Kellogg Co, acquired in 2025 by Ferrero
- W. K. Kellogg Foundation, a philanthropic, non-profit organization
- Kellogg Switchboard and Supply Company, American telephone equipment manufacturer

=== Education ===
- Kellogg College, Oxford, one of the constituent colleges of Oxford University, UK
- Kellogg Community College, a public community college in Battle Creek, Michigan, US
- Kellogg School of Management, at Northwestern University, in Evanston, Illinois, US
- Kellogg School of Science and Technology, at Scripps Research, in San Diego, California, US

== Places ==
- Kellogg, Idaho
- Kellogg, Iowa
- Kellogg, Kansas
- Kellogg, Minnesota
- Kellogg, Missouri
- Kellogg, Oregon
- Kellogg Interchange, a freeway interchange in Southern California
- Kellogg Avenue, the U.S. Route 54 and U.S. Route 400 freeway through Wichita, Kansas

== See also ==
- KBR, Inc., formerly Kellogg, Brown and Root, an American engineering and construction company
- Kellogg–Briand Pact, a 1928 multinational anti-war pact
