= Violets Are Blue (1986 film) =

1986 film by Jack Fisk

- Theatrical release poster
- Directed by: Jack Fisk
- Written by: Naomi Foner
- Produced by: Marykay Powell
- Starring: Sissy Spacek; Kevin Kline; Bonnie Bedelia
- Cinematography: Ralf D. Bode
- Edited by: Edward Warschilka
- Music by: Patrick Williams
- Distributed by: Columbia Pictures
- Release date: April 25, 1986
- Running time: 86 minutes
- Country: United States
- Language: English
- Budget: $10 million
- Box office: $4,743,287

Violets Are Blue is a 1986 American romantic drama film directed by Jack Fisk and starring Sissy Spacek and Kevin Kline. The film was distributed by Columbia Pictures.

== Plot ==
After fifteen years of traveling around the world, famous photographer Gussie returns for a two-week break to the Maryland coastal resort where she grew up. She meets her high school sweetheart Henry, now married and running the local newspaper he inherited from his father. Soon after, an awkward and tension-filled romance ensues.

== Cast ==
- Sissy Spacek as Gussie Sawyer
- Kevin Kline as Henry Squires
- Bonnie Bedelia as Ruth Squires
- John Kellogg as Ralph Sawyer
- Jim Standiford as Addy Squires
- Augusta Dabney as Ethel Sawyer
- Kate McGregor-Stewart as Sara Mae
- Annalee Jefferies as Sally
- Mike Starr as Tony
- Adrian Sparks as George

== Production ==
The bulk of the filming took place in downtown Ocean City, MD, including scenes on the boardwalk and nearby Assateague Island. Local sailors in Maryland trained Kevin Kline and Sissy Spacek on the basics of sailing so they could do their boat scenes without the use of any doubles. The film was shot from August–October 1984, and Director Jack Fisk worked on extensive editing cuts to please the studio, at the time commenting: “I believe that film thrives on a certain pressure, on not having enough time. But with 'Violets,' we were given too much time. They had us try too many things.” At its first studio screening in December 1984, the film had a running time of 1 hour, 47 minutes. The final cut was reduced to 90 minutes before the film was released in April 1986.

== Reception ==
Upon the film's release, Roger Ebert awarded the film 3 out of 4 stars, writing "What’s interesting about “Violets Are Blue” is that it’s not necessarily the movie we expect it to be, and Spacek doesn’t necessarily play the role we expect from her. It’s a movie about adults making some hard choices, facing some inflexible realities in their lives. And when it’s over we realize it caused us to think about a couple of things: not only the road not chosen, but also the road that we have chosen and our responsibilities to it.". Ebert also praised the supporting performances of John Kellogg and Bonnie Bedelia, writing: "Although the characters of Gussie and Henry are played with great subtlety and warmth by Spacek and Kline, the best scenes in the movie belong to two of the supporting actors: Bedelia as Henry’s wife, and Kellogg as Gussie’s father. They stand up for what they believe in. They refuse to cave in to easy notions of romance or love or inevitability. Bedelia stands in her kitchen one day and clearly, unforgivingly lays out for her husband what his choices are, and it’s perhaps the key scene in the movie." On Rotten Tomatoes, the film has an aggregate score of 63% based on 5 positive and 3 negative critic reviews. Audiences polled by CinemaScore gave the film an average grade of "C+" on an A+ to F scale.
