= Cochichewick River =

Cochichewick River Cochichewick Brook

Location
- Country: United States
- State: Massachusetts
- City: North Andover

Physical characteristics
- Source
  - coordinates: 42°41′23″N 071°06′23″W
- Mouth
  - coordinates: 42°42′30″N 071°08′03″W
- Length: 1.6 mi (2.6 km)

The Cochichewick River, also known as Cochichewick Brook, is a 1.6-mile-long (2.6 km) stream in North Andover, Massachusetts, that drains water from Lake Cochichewick into the Merrimack River.

== Early history ==
Stevens Pond in 2026

The river's first European record dates from March 4, 1634-5, when "It is ordered that the land aboute Cochichowicke, shall be reserved for an inland plantacon, & that whosoever will goe to inhabite there, shall have three yeares immunity from all taxes, levyes, publique charges & services whatsoever, (military dissipline onely excepted), etc."

The Massachusetts Colony Records later note the sale of land thereabouts to the English:

At a general Court at Boston 6th of 3d month, 1646, Cutshamache, Sagamore of Massachusetts, came into the court and acknowledged that, for the sum of L6 and a coat which he had already received, he had sold to Mr. John Woodbridge, in behalf of the inhabitants of Cochichewick, now called Andover, all the right, interest and privilege in the land six miles southward from the town, two miles eastward to Rowley bounds, be the same more or less; northward to Merrimack river, provided that the Indian called Roger, and his company, may have liberty to take alewives in Cochichewick river for their own eating; but if they either spoil or steal any corn or other fruit to any considerable value of the inhabitants, the liberty of taking fish shall forever cease, and the said Roger is still to enjoy four acres of ground where now he plants.

== Settlement and early industry ==
Andover's (now called North Andover) first settlements were made about Cochichewick Brook, a "fair springe of sweet water." By 1835, North Andover had two textile mill districts (Sutton Mills and Stevens Mills) on the river. In the 18th and 19th centuries, milldams were built along the brook to power lumber- and gristmills, creating Stevens Pond. The Weir Hill reservation, now owned by The Trustees of Reservations, was originally the Stevens country estate above Lake Cochichewick and Stevens Pond.
