= Lughano Nyondo =

Malawian footballer

Personal information
- Place of birth: Malawi
- Position: Striker

International career
Years	Team	Apps	(Gls)
- Malawi

Lughano Nyondo is a Malawian footballer who plays as a striker for Brooks School and the Malawi women's national football team.

== Early life ==
Nyondo attended five different schools in five years before attending Brooks School in North Andover, Massachusetts.

== Career ==
Nyondo played for the Malawi women's national football team. She joined the youth academy of Malawian side Ascent Soccer at the age of 12. In 2020 she was offered a four year scholarship at the Brooks School on Massachusetts. After Brooks she played soccer for Northeastern Huskies.

== Style of play ==
Nyondo mainly operates as a striker. She is two-footed.

== Personal life ==
Nyondo's native language is Tumbuka. She is a native of Mzuzu, Malawi.
