= Lucien F. Burpee =

American judge (1855–1924)

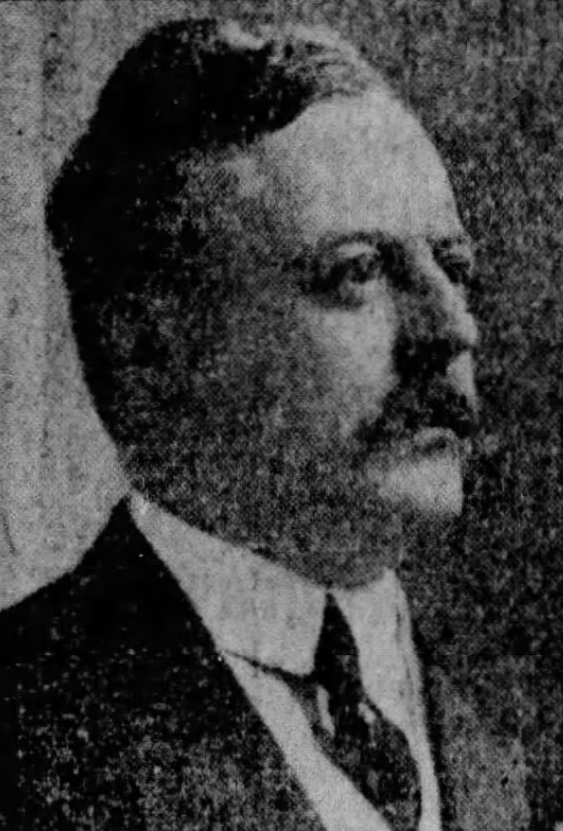
Judge Lucien F. Burpee in 1921

Lucien Francis Burpee (October 12, 1855 – May 9, 1924) was an American soldier, lawyer, and judge who served as a justice of the Connecticut Supreme Court from 1921 until his death in 1924.

== Early life, education, and career ==
Born in Rockville, Connecticut, to Colonel Thomas F. Burpee and Adeline M. (Harwood) Burpee, he prepared for college in the public schools of Rockville, and received a B.A. from Yale College, with honors, in the class of 1879. After studying law at the Yale Law School and at Hamilton College, he gained admission to the bar in 1881, and began the practice of law at Waterbury with Stephen W. Kellogg. He later entered into a partnership with Kellogg and his son, John P. Kellogg, under the firm name of Kellogg, Burpee and Kellogg, which was continued until 1889.

He served as prosecuting attorney of the City Court of Waterbury until 1890, then as corporation counsel for the city from 1890 to 1896. In 1897 he became judge of the Waterbury City Court, serving in that position until 1909, when he was appointed a judge of the Connecticut Superior Court.

== Military service ==
For many years, Burpee served in the Connecticut National Guard, passing from Second Lieutenant through all grades to that of Colonel of the Second Regiment. At the outbreak of the Spanish–American War, he recruited a full regiment offered its services to Governor Lorrin A. Cooke on April 25, 1898, "for any time and any place". Not being called into action immediately, he obtained a leave of absence from the state military authorities, and accepted a commission from President William McKinley as Lieutenant Colonel in the United States Volunteer Army. He served throughout the campaign at Puerto Rico on the staffs of Major General Nelson A. Miles, commanding the United States Army, and Major General James H. Wilson, commanding the First Division, First Army Corps. In official dispatches to the government, Burpee received honorable mention for distinguished service.

On four occasions, under appointments from Connecticut Governors, he took a leading part in revising the military laws and regulations of this State. In March 1917, he was requested by Governor Marcus H. Holcomb to organize troops for state defense, the National Guard having been called into Federal service in the World War, and was appointed Chairman of the Military Emergency Board, provided for by an Act of the Legislature enacted during that month. Under his leadership as Major General of the Home Guard, nearly 20,000 men were recruited for that service, about one half of whom were placed on the active list and promptly armed, uniformed and equipped for service. During a period of three years, he directed this work in addition to performing his duties as a judge of the Superior Court, and was commander of the state guard with the rank of major general.

Former Governor Holcomb, in memorializing Burpee, said that "during July and August, known as the vacation months, he gave one week to each of the six military districts of the Home Guard of the State for drill and instruction at the Niantic Military Camp Grounds, with the result that during the World War this State had the finest body of citizen soldiers of any State, and was a model for other States". Holcomb suggested that the strain of such service contributed to Burpee's early death.

== Government and judicial service ==
Burpee served as a prosecuting attorney of Waterbury until 1890, and then as city attorney until 1896. In 1897, he became a judge of the city court, and in 1909 he was appointed a judge of the superior court. On March 22, 1921, Governor Everett J. Lake nominated Burpee to a seat on the state supreme court vacated by the death of Justice William S. Case. Burpee took office in April 1921.

At his memorial service in the state supreme court, Chief Justice George W. Wheeler highlighted certain of Burpee's opinions, including the taxation case of Underwood Typewriter Co. v. Hartford; Whitehill v. Halbing, concerning the revocation of wills; Bissell v. Butterworth, on the creation of a trust fund for veterans; and State v. Ferrone, defending the right of an accused to a fair trial.

== Personal life and death ==
Burpee married Irene A. Fitch, with whom he had two daughters and a son.

Burpee died at his home, in West Hartford, following a lengthy illness, at the age of 68. He was buried in his family lot in Grove Hill Cemetery in Rockville, where his parents were buried.

Political offices
Preceded by William S. Case	Justice of the Connecticut Supreme Court; 1921–1924	Succeeded by John P. Kellogg
