= Samuel Hymer =

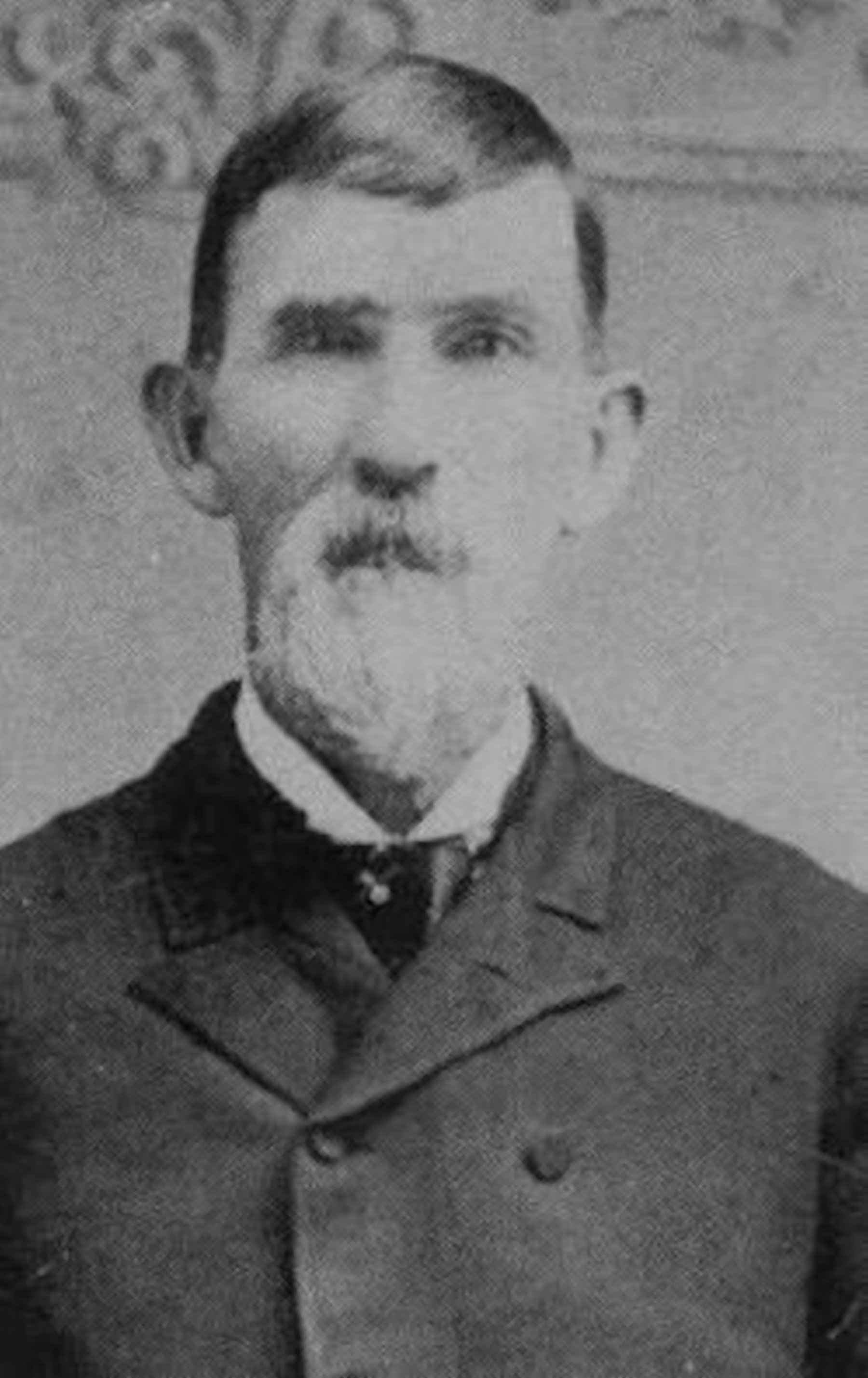
Samuel Hymer c1898 GAR

Samuel Hymer (May 17, 1829 – May 9, 1906) was an American soldier and Medal of Honor recipient.

== Biography ==
Hymer was born on May 17, 1829, in Harrison County, Indiana. He served as a captain in Company D. of the 115th Illinois Volunteer Infantry Regiment. He earned his medal at Buzzard's Roost Gap, Georgia on October 13, 1864. He died on May 9, 1906, and is buried in the city he died in Rushville Cemetery, Rushville, Illinois.

== Medal of Honor citation ==
With only 41 men under his command (Company D, 115th Illinois Infantry), defended and held a blockhouse against the attack of Hood's Division for nearly 10 hours, thus checking the advance of the enemy and insuring the safety of the balance of the regiment, as well as that of the 8th Kentucky Infantry, then stationed at Ringgold, Georgia.
