= Justice Kellogg =

Justice Kellogg may refer to:

- Daniel Kellogg (judge) (1791–1875), associate justice of the Vermont Supreme Court
- Henry T. Kellogg (1869–1942), associate justice of the New York Court of Appeals
- John P. Kellogg (1860–1925), associate justice of the Connecticut Supreme Court
- Loyal C. Kellogg (1816–1871), associate justice of the Vermont Supreme Court
