= Alexander Campbell (Illinois politician) =

American politician

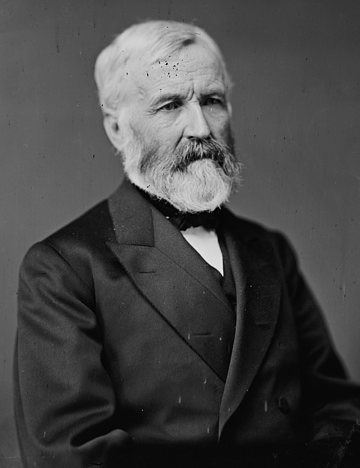

Member of the U.S. House of Representatives from Illinois's 7th district
- In office March 4, 1875 – March 3, 1877
- Preceded by: Franklin Corwin
- Succeeded by: Philip C. Hayes

Member of the Illinois House of Representatives
- In office 1858-1859

Personal details
- Born: October 4, 1814 Concord, Pennsylvania, U.S.
- Died: August 8, 1898 (aged 83) LaSalle, Illinois, U.S.
- Party: Whig; Republican; Independent; Greenback

Alexander Campbell (October 4, 1814 – August 8, 1898) was an Illinois businessman, politician, and author. After serving in state and local office as a member of the Whig Party and the Republican Party, Campbell published a book titled The True American System of Finance, becoming a leading figure in the Greenback movement. Campbell's work expanded on that of economist Edward Kellogg, who had advocated for fiat money. Campbell served a single term in the United States House of Representatives as an independent, and won the backing of several delegates for the presidential nomination at the 1876 and 1880 Greenback National Convention.

== Background ==
Cambell was born on a farm near Concord, Franklin County, Pennsylvania. He attended the public schools; became a clerk in an iron works and was subsequently promoted to superintendent, became wealthy managing mines and steel mills in Pennsylvania, Kentucky, and Missouri until 1850, when he moved to LaSalle, Illinois and became interested in the coal fields there.

== Public office and political theory ==
As a member of the Whig Party, Campbell won election as mayor of the newly established town of LaSalle, serving two terms in that office in the early 1850s. He then served as a Republican member of the Illinois House of Representatives from 1858 to 1859. He was a delegate to the 1862 Illinois Constitutional Convention.

In 1864, Campbell expanded on the ideas of pre-Civil-War U.S. economist Edward Kellogg in a book titled The True American System of Finance. In the book, Campbell followed Kellogg's example in advocating for fiat money. He differed from Kellogg in that he favored maintaining that system through a currency and bond system rather than through re-establishing a national bank.

The publication of The True American System of Finance made Campbell one of the leading figures in the evolving Greenback movement to replace bank currency with United States Notes in an effort to place labor on an equal footing with capital in the structure of finance. "Money creates no wealth," he wrote. "It only gathers up and appropriates to its owner things already produced." He followed this up in 1868 with The True Greenback.

He was elected as an independent to the Forty-fourth Congress from the Illinois's 7th congressional district, unseating Republican incumbent Franklin Corwin. He served from 1875 to 1877, and sought re-election in 1876, but was defeated by Republican Philip C. Hayes. Campbell received several votes for the presidential nomination at the 1876 Greenback National Convention, but the nomination went to Peter Cooper.

== After Congress ==
After his defeat, he never again held public office, although he issued pamphlets such as his 1878 Address to the voters of the seventh congressional district of Illinois.

He was a candidate for the presidential nomination at the 1880 Greenback National Convention, but the convention nominated James B. Weaver.

He died in LaSalle on August 8, 1898, and was buried in Oakwood Cemetery.

== Footnotes ==
U.S. House of Representatives
Preceded by Franklin Corwin	Member of the U.S. House of Representatives from Illinois's 7th congressional district 1875-1877	Succeeded by Philip C. Hayes
