= Alberto T. Roraback =

American judge (1849–1923)

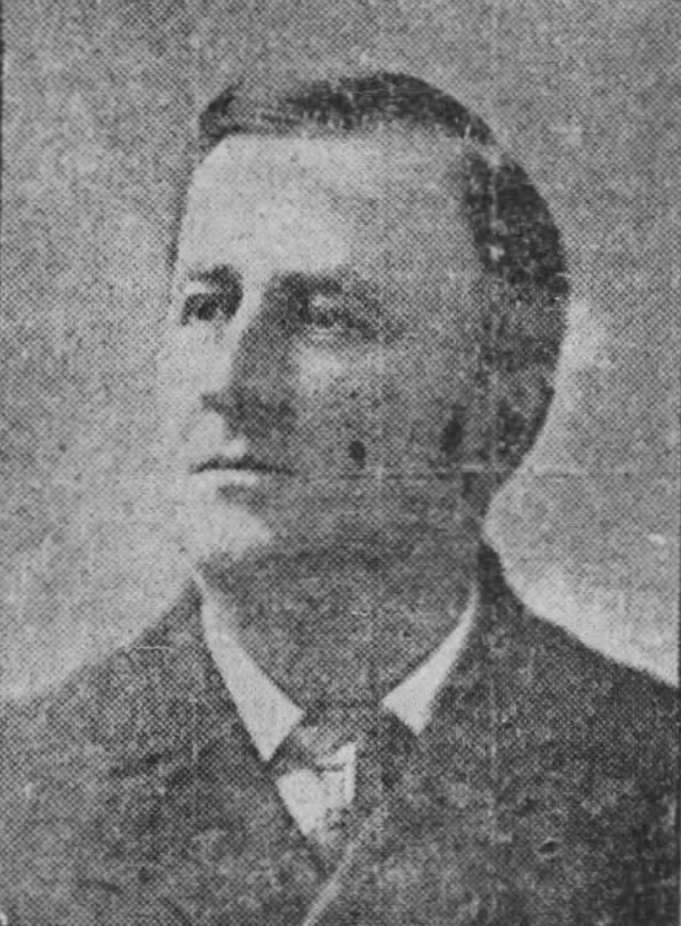
Justice Alberto T. Roraback

Alberto T. Roraback (August 23, 1849, in Sheffield, Massachusetts – February 1, 1923, in Canaan, Connecticut) was an American lawyer, politician, and judge. He was a judge of the Connecticut Supreme Court from 1908 to 1919.

== Early life ==
Roraback's father John C. Roraback was a farmer, the descendant of German immigrants from one of several settlements named "Rohrbach" in Lorraine who had settled in Columbia County, New York around 1700. He moved his family to Sheffield, Massachusetts in the Berkshires around 1846. Alberto attended public schools in Sheffield and then the South Berkshire Institute in nearby New Marlborough. He then went to the Genesee Wesleyan Seminary in Lima, New York. In 1870 he entered the law offices of Judge Donald Warner in Salisbury, Connecticut to study law, and was admitted to the bar in 1872.

== Public service ==
Roraback became a successful lawyer based in North Canaan, Connecticut. He also was involved in Republican Party politics, serving as a delegate to the 1888 Republican National Convention and on the Republican State Committee. From 1889 to 1893 he served as Judge of the Court of Common Pleas of Litchfield County. In 1895 and 1897 he was elected as a Republican to the Connecticut House of Representatives from North Canaan. In 1897 (with the Republicans back in control of the legislature) he was reappointed to the Court of Common Pleas, and then to a vacancy on the Superior Court. In 1907 he was reappointed to the Superior Court and also to the Connecticut Supreme Court (then called the "Supreme Court of Errors") upon the mandatory retirement of Justice William Hamersley in 1908. He retired in 1919 on reaching the mandatory retirement age of 70, although he continued to work as a State Referee until his death.

He was memorialized in his official obituary prepared by Chief Justice George W. Wheeler as "one of the most competent trial court judges of his generation".

== Family ==
Roraback married Minnie E. Hunt, daughter of ironmaker Edward P. Hunt, in 1873. They had 7 children, of which 5 were alive in 1906: Grace, Louise, Albert E., Joseph Clinton (b. 1882), and Catherine. Albert E. Roraback (1880–1973) was a football center at Yale University and became a minister; Joseph Clinton Roraback also played football at Yale and became a lawyer. Albert E. Roraback's daughter Catherine Roraback (1920–2007) became a notable civil rights lawyer, best known for Griswold v. Connecticut.

Roraback was a brother to J. Henry Roraback, Connecticut Republican party boss of the early 20th century – although Henry was 21 years younger. Henry took over Alberto's private practice in 1897 when Alberto was reappointed to the Superior Court.

Roraback's younger first cousin Willard Andrew Roraback (1860–1928) studied law with him and was also in the Connecticut House in 1895, representing Torrington.

Political offices
Preceded by William Hamersley	Justice of the Connecticut Supreme Court; 1908–1919	Succeeded by William S. Case
