= Abiel Stevens House =

Historic house in Massachusetts, United States

- U.S. National Register of Historic Places
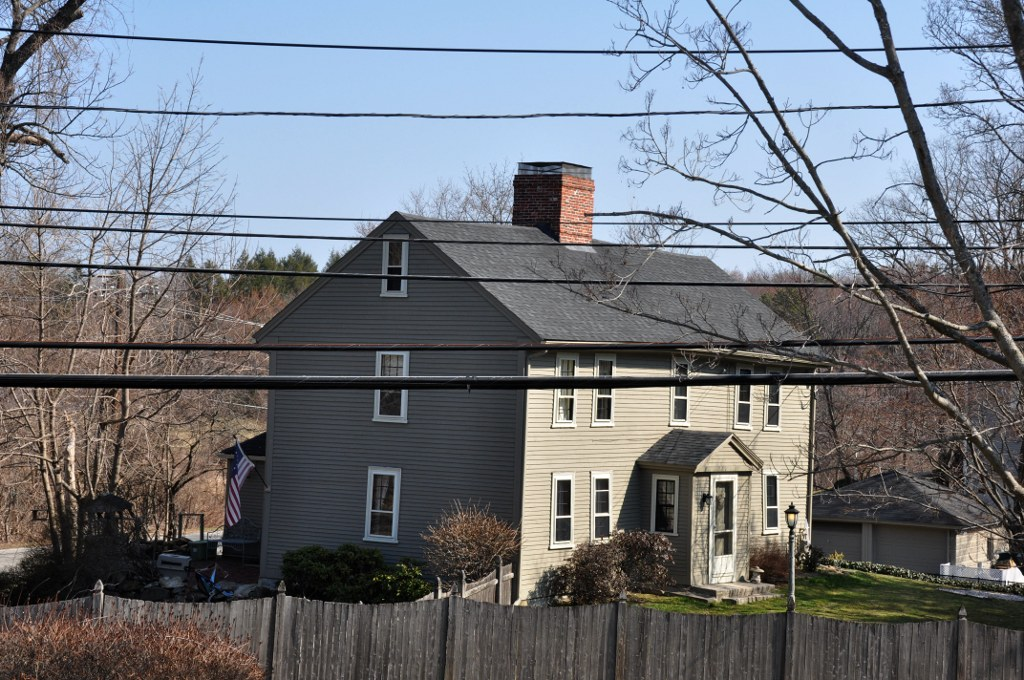

- Location within Massachusetts Location within the United States
- Location: 280 Salem St., North Andover, Massachusetts
- Coordinates: 42°40′50″N 71°6′0″W
- Built: 1710
- NRHP reference No.: 83000585
- Added to NRHP: June 23, 1983

The Abiel Stevens House is a historic First-Period house in North Andover, Massachusetts. The 2 1/2-story wood-frame house is unusual for retaining its basic 18th century form with minimal alteration. The house was built in 1710 by Abiel Stevens, one of Andover's early major landowners. The major alterations since Stevens built the house include a late 18th-century lean-to added to the back of the house, and the front porch, which dates to the same time.

The house was listed on the National Register of Historic Places in 1983.

== See also ==
- National Register of Historic Places listings in Essex County, Massachusetts
- List of the oldest buildings in Massachusetts
