= Col. John Osgood House =

Historic house in Massachusetts, United States

- U.S. National Register of Historic Places
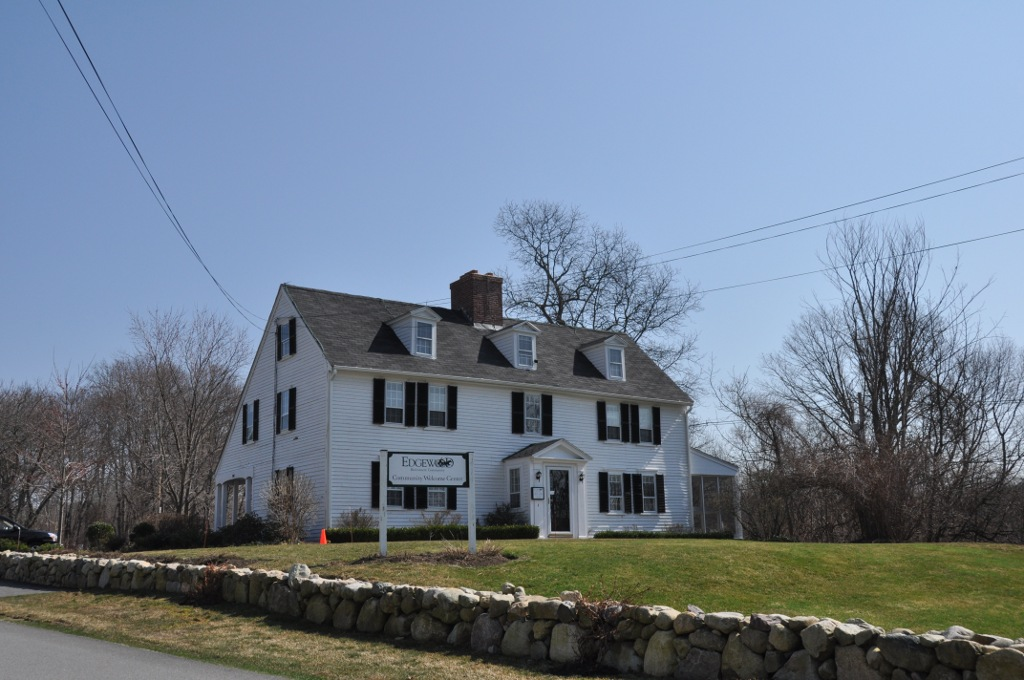

- Location within Massachusetts Location within the United States
- Location: 547 Osgood Street, North Andover, Massachusetts
- Coordinates: 42°42′3″N 71°6′42″W
- Built: 1720
- Architectural style: Colonial
- MPS: First Period Buildings of Eastern Massachusetts TR
- NRHP reference No.: 90000250
- Added to NRHP: March 9, 1990

The Col. John Osgood House is a historic late First Period house in North Andover, Massachusetts. The original part of the house, its left side, was built c. 1720. A second, similar building (without chimney) was then attached to the right side of the chimney at a later date, demonstrating an unusual method of joining the two structures. The house was listed on the National Register of Historic Places in 1990.

== Description and history ==
The Col. John Osgood House is set on the east side of Osgood Street, just south of a side spur road leading to a condominium complex. It is a 2 1/2-story wood-frame structure, five bays wide, with a central chimney, clapboard siding, and an integral rear leanto section giving the house a traditional New England saltbox profile. The front facade is symmetrically arranged, with a projecting central entrance vestibule with a gable pediment. The flanking bays have windows, spaced in groups of two, and there are three gabled dormers projecting from the roof. An enclosed porch extends to the right of the main block.

The house is built of two distinct structures, which were joined in the 18th century. The main portion, built c. 1720 was the leftmost three bays, which included a large central chimney (which has since been rebuilt). To this, probably early in the building's history, a similar structure of equal or older age, was added to the right. The tie beams of the two structures were joined by doubly dovetailed timbers, a method rarely seen for such work in eastern Massachusetts. The house originally faced south, but was rotated on its site to face west when the road was realigned in the early 20th century. At that time the chimney was partially rebuilt to accommodate the new configuration. The porch, front vestibule, and dormers are all 20th century alterations, as is the removal of part of the rear leanto to provide space for a patio.

== Notable residents ==
None

== See also ==
- National Register of Historic Places listings in Essex County, Massachusetts
- List of the oldest buildings in Massachusetts
