= William Kellogg =

William Kellogg may refer to:

- William Kellogg (Illinois politician), U.S. Representative from Illinois
- William Pitt Kellogg 19th century Governor of Louisiana
- William Welch Kellogg, climatologist

== See also ==
- Will Keith Kellogg, founder of the Kellogg Company
