= William Welch Kellogg =

American meteorologist and climatologist

William Welch Kellogg (February 14, 1917 – December 12, 2007) was an American meteorologist and climatologist. He served as associate director and senior scientist at the National Center for Atmospheric Research (NCAR). His research included pioneering studies of the role that satellites could play in weather observation and prediction.

== Biography ==
Kellogg was born in New York Mills, New York, to Fredrick and Elisabeth Kellogg. He attended the Brooks School in North Andover, Massachusetts, and graduated from Yale in 1939 with a BA in physics. At Yale, he was a member of Skull and Bones. His graduate studies at U.C., Berkeley were interrupted by World War II, when he served in the Air Force's new meteorological program. As a pilot and weather officer, with his strong passion for flying, he collected some of the first data on the dynamics of thunderstorms by flying B-25s into the heart of the storms.

=== Weather satellites ===
After the war, while working on a PhD from UCLA, he joined the RAND Corporation in Santa Monica, California, where he was instrumental in establishing the potential value of satellites in meteorological research. His 1951 research paper (written with S. M. Greenfield) introduced many of the concepts still in use today, including the effects of Earth's oblate shape, which is now exploited to produce solar synchronous satellites for weather observation and other forms of remote sensing. He chaired the committee that set the specifications for TIROS-1, the first operational weather satellite.

=== Later work ===
He also collaborated on a procedure to predict close-in radioactive fallout from nuclear explosions. This resulted in the first unclassified report in a scientific journal describing such fallout and his testimony on this subject before a joint committee of Congress. In 1964, he was invited by Walter Orr Roberts to join NCAR as director of the Laboratory of Atmospheric Sciences. He was a chief organizer of the international Study of Man's Impact on Climate (SMIC) held in Sweden in 1971. In 1973, he decided to devote himself to full-time climate research and pursue his growing interest in climate change. He and his wife lived in Geneva, Switzerland in 1978–79, where he was advisor to the Secretary General of the World Meteorological Organization. In 1981, he and sociologist Robert Schware co-authored one of the first books on the subject of climate change. He retired from NCAR in 1987.

== Positions held ==
He served on the National Academy of Science's Space Science Board (teaming with Carl Sagan to review our knowledge of the atmospheres of Mars and Venus), the Atmospheric Science Committee, and the Polar Research Board. He also served on the President's Science Advisory Committee, the USAF Scientific Advisory Committee, and the NASA Space Program Advisory Council.

He was Past President of the American Meteorological Society (1973) and the Meteorology Section of the American Geophysical Union. He was a Fellow of the American Meteorological Society, the American Association for the Advancement of Science and the American Geophysical Union.

== Selected writings ==
- Kellogg, William W. and Carl Sagan. 1961. The Atmospheres of Mars and Venus: A Report by the Ad Hoc Panel on Planetary Atmospheres of the Space Science Board (Publication 944). Washington, D. C.: The National Academy of Sciences National Research Council.
- Kellogg, William W. (1971). "Predicting the Climate." In Man's Impact on the Climate [Study of Critical Environmental Problems (SCEP) Report], edited by William H. Matthews, et al., pp. 123–32. Cambridge, MA: MIT Press. ISBN 0-262-13075-0
- Kellogg, William W., and Stephen H. Schneider (1974). "Climate Stabilization: For Better or for Worse?" Science 186: 1163–72.
- Kellogg, William W., et al. (1975). "Effect of Anthropogenic Aerosols on the Global Climate." In Proceedings of the WMO/IAMAP Symposium on Long-Term Climatic Fluctuations, Norwich, Aug. 1975 (WMO Doc. 421) pp. 323–30. Geneva: World Meteorological Organization.
- Kellogg, William W., and Margaret Mead. 1977. The Atmosphere: endangered and endangering. Fogarty International Center proceedings, no. 39. [Bethesda]: U.S. Dept. of Health, Education, and Welfare, Public Health Service, National Institutes of Health.
- Kellogg, William W. (1980). "Aerosols and Climate." In Interactions of Energy and Climate, edited by W. Bach et al., pp. 281–96. Kluwer Academic. ISBN 90-277-1177-1
- Kellogg, William W., and Robert Schware (1981). Climate Change and Society: Consequences of Increasing Atmospheric Carbon Dioxide. Boulder, CO: Westview Press. ISBN 0-86531-180-3
- Kellogg, William W. (1987). "Mankind's Impact on Climate: The Evolution of an Awareness." Climatic Change 10: 113–36.
