= Weir Hill =

Public park in Massachusetts, USA

Coordinates: 42°41′37″N 71°6′15″W

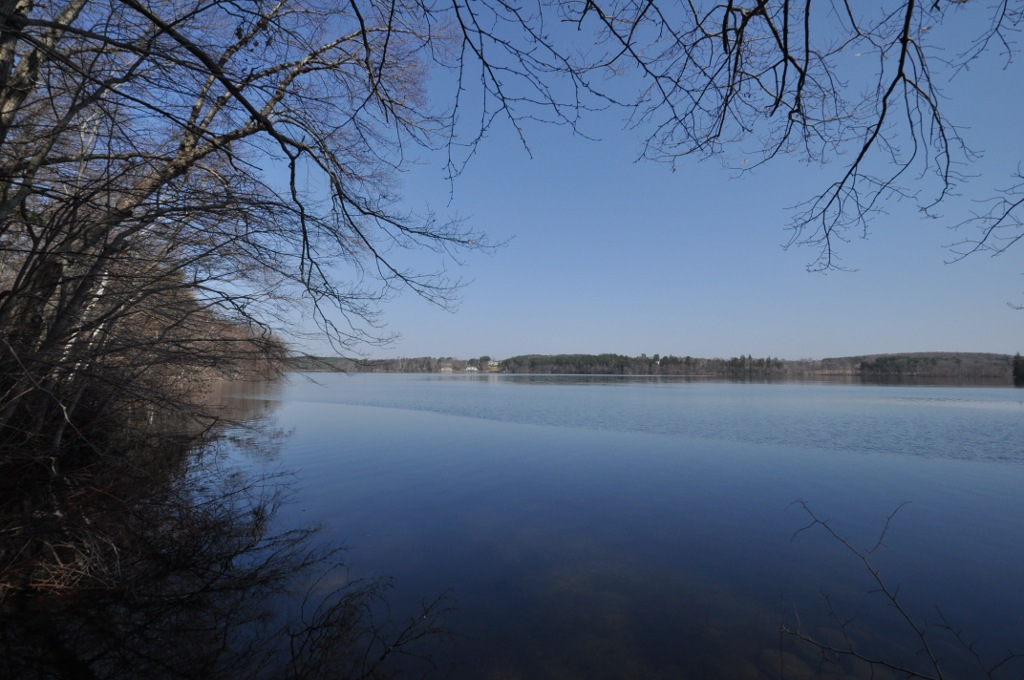
View of Lake Cochichewick from the reservation

Weir Hill Reservation (historically pronounced “wire hill”) is a 194-acre (0.79 km^{2}) public park located in the town of North Andover, Massachusetts. The Trustees of Reservations owns and maintains the property.

== History ==
Prior to European settlement of the area, the Weir Hill area was used by Algonquian peoples. A 1968 archaeological survey identified a campsite at the southeast end of the reservation. It is likely that Native Americans periodically set fire to the hill to improve the landscape for deer hunting and used fishing weirs to catch alewives in Cochichewick Brook before they reached Lake Cochichewick to spawn. The reservation takes its name from these weirs.

In the mid 17th century, early settlers cleared the slopes of Weir Hill for grazing sheep and cattle. In the 18th and 19th centuries, milldams were built along Cochichewick Brook to lumber- and gristmills.

== Modern use and conservation ==
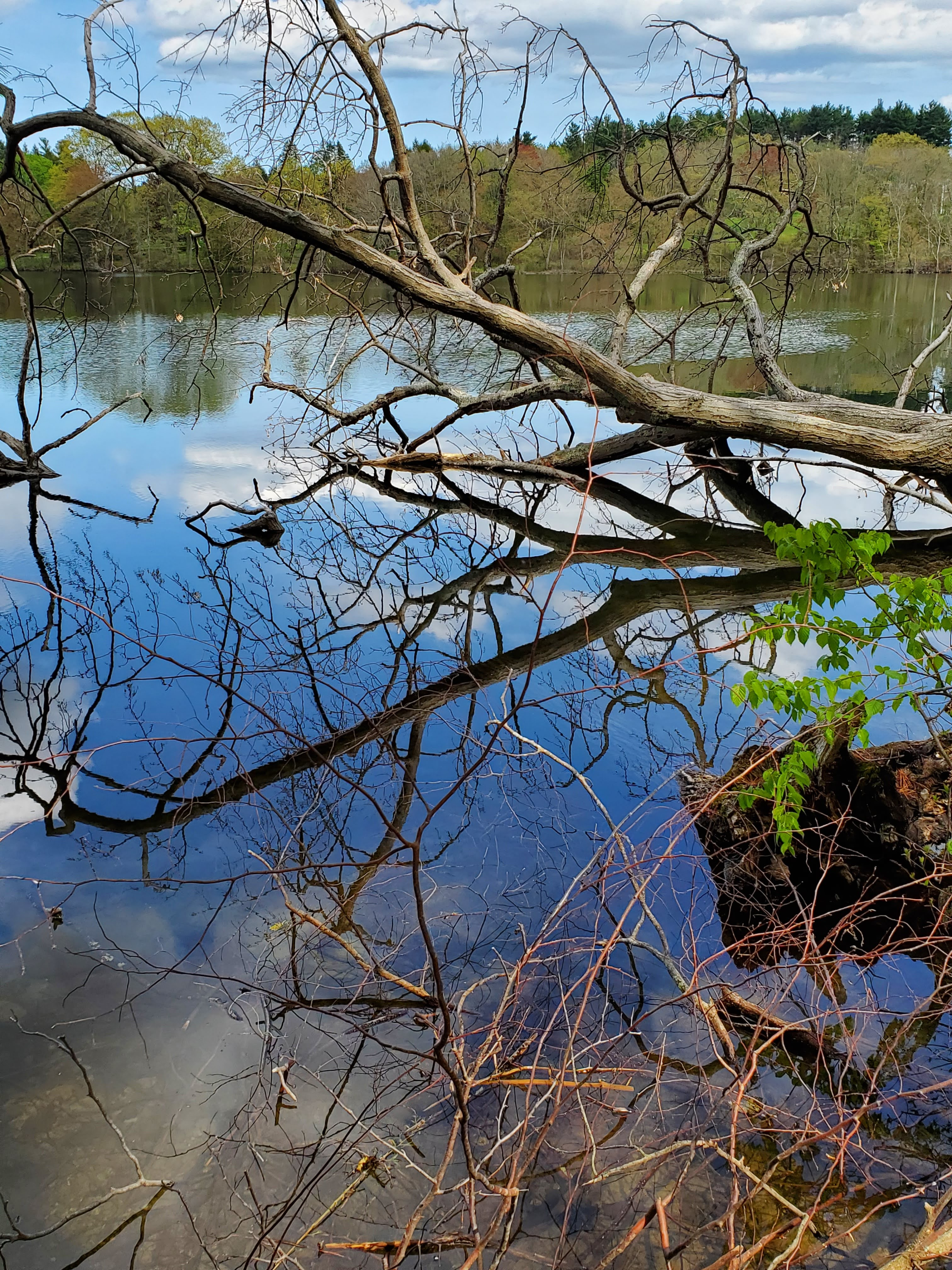

Rising gently above Lake Cochichewick, Weir Hill offers hiking trails that pass over the crest of the 305-foot (93 m) double drumlin and track the shore of the lake. A rail trail runs along part of the hill, overlooking Lake Cochichewick. Many North Andover residents also use the trail system for cross-country, mountain biking, and its shores to go swimming.

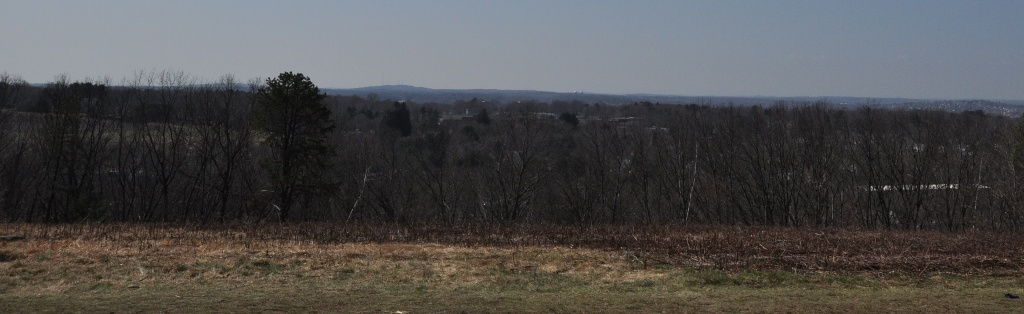
View from the top of Weir Hill, generally westward. Higher peaks visible through the haze may include Mount Wachusett and/or Mount Monadnock.

Generations of agricultural use, wildfire, cutting and mowing have created a patchwork landscape on Weir Hill that supports ten different types of plant communities including a 60-acre (240,000 m^{2}) oak and hickory, hillside seeps, intermittent streams, and wet meadows. Several threatened species can be found on Weir Hill, including the white bog orchid, violet bush clover and butternut trees.

Beginning with the park's establishment in 1968, Weir Hill has been expanded numerous times since to include more woodlands and conservation area.
