= Louise Phelps Kellogg =

American historian (1862–1942)

Louise Phelps Kellogg (May 12, 1862 – July 11, 1942) was an American historian, writer, and educator.

== Early life and education ==
Eva Louise Phelps Kellogg was born on May 12, 1862, in Milwaukee, Wisconsin. She later stopped going by "Eva".

The Women's Education Association, Boston, granted Kellogg a fellowship that allowed her to continue her education in London and Paris. She earned her bachelor's and doctorate degrees in 1897 and 1901 from University of Wisconsin–Madison, where she studied under Frederick Jackson Turner. She was one of a handful of students who participated in Turner's class on the west, the first ever offered at any U.S. college.

== Career ==
After graduation, she joined the State Historical Society of Wisconsin as library research assistant to Reuben Gold Thwaites. During this time the history profession was growing, especially in the areas of state history and of the West. Kellogg at the WHS quickly gained notoriety in this field and state historical societies often consulted with her. Through her research and publications she gained a reputation as one of the leading U.S. historians of the French and British eras in the Great Lakes. Her major works included the French Regime and Northwest and The British Regime in Wisconsin and the Northwest. She also contributed to The New Dictionary of America and volumes 17–20 of the State Historical Society of Wisconsin's collections.

She received the 1903 Justin Winsor Prize from the American Historical Association. She was also elected president of the Mississippi Valley Historical Association in 1930. She was awarded honorary degrees from the University of Wisconsin and Marquette University.

She died in Madison, Wisconsin, on July 11, 1942, and is interred in Forest Home Cemetery in Milwaukee.

== Works ==
- The American colonial charter; a study of English administration in relation thereto, chiefly after 1688, 1904.
- (ed. with Reuben Gold Thwaites) Documentary history of Dunmore's War, 1774 : compiled from the Draper Manuscripts in the library of the Wisconsin Historical Society and published at the charge of the Wisconsin Society of the Sons of the American Revolution, 1905
- ( ed. with Reuben Gold Thwaites) The revolution on the upper Ohio, 1775–1777: compiled from the Draper manuscripts in the library of the Wisconsin historical society of the Sons of the American revolution, 1908.
- (ed. with Reuben Gold Thwaites) Frontier defense on the upper Ohio, 1777–1778 : compiled from the Draper manuscripts in the library of the Wisconsin Historical Society and pub. at the charge of the Wisconsin Society of the Sons of the American Revolution, 1912.
- Early narratives of the Northwest, 1634–1699, 1917.
- (tr. and ed.) Journal of a voyage to North America by Pierre-François-Xavier de Charlevoix. 1923.
- The French régime in Wisconsin and the Northwest, 1925.
- (ed.) Stagecoach and tavern tales of the Old Northwest by Henry Kellogg. 1930.
- The British régime in Wisconsin and the Northwest, 1935.

== Sources ==
- "Louise Phelps Kellogg 1862–1942". The Wisconsin Magazine of History. 26 (1): 6–7. 1942. ISSN 0043-6534. JSTOR 4631495.
- Kinnett, David (1979). "Miss Kellogg's Quiet Passion". The Wisconsin Magazine of History. 62 (4): 266–299. ISSN 0043-6534. JSTOR 4635349.
