= Lake Cochichewick =

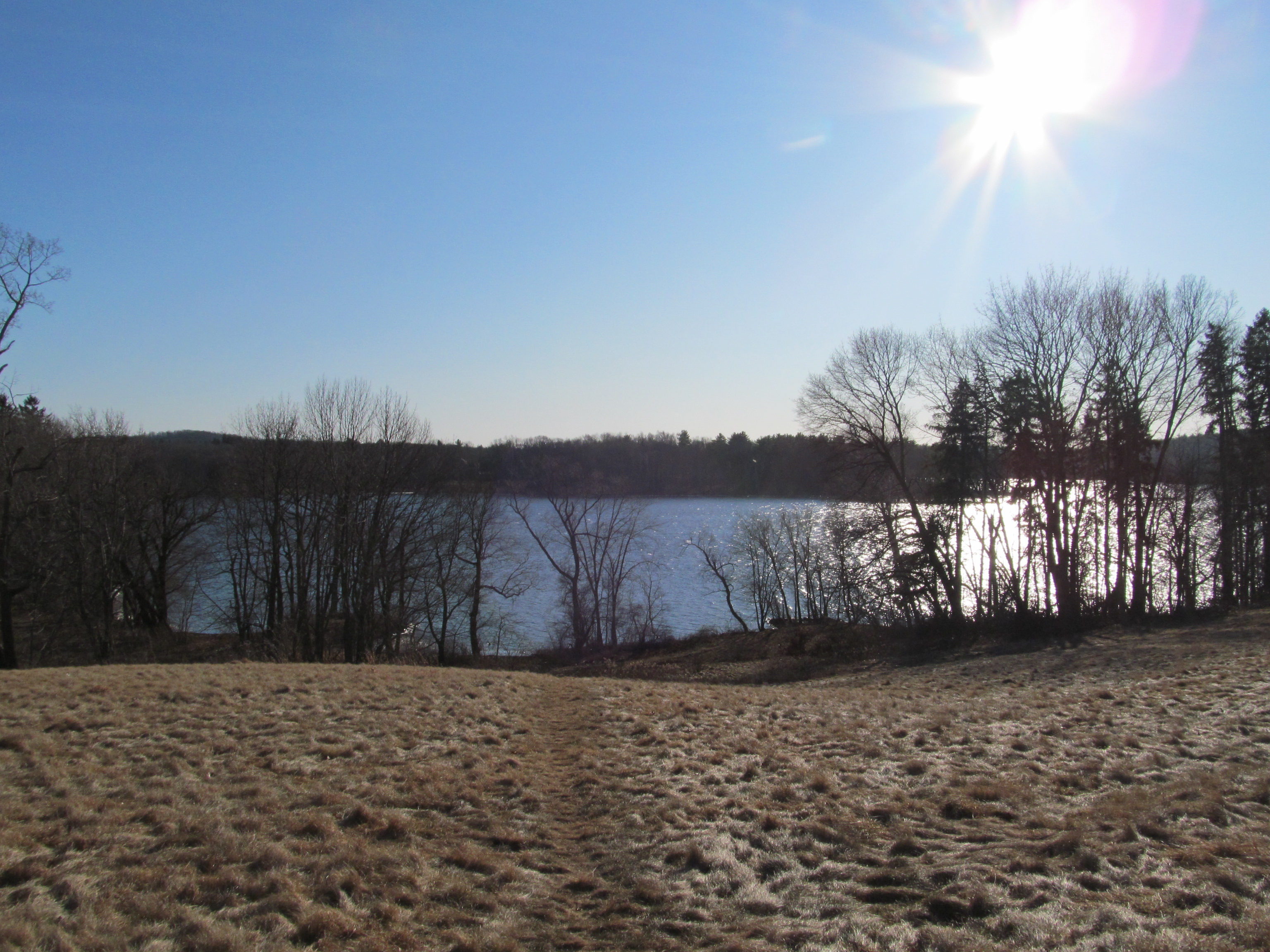
- View from the Brooks School

- Location within Massachusetts Location within the United States
- Location: North Andover, Massachusetts
- Coordinates: 42°42′14″N 71°05′50″W
- Type: lake
- Primary inflows: Weir Hill and other local uplands
- Primary outflows: Cochichewick River
- Basin countries: United States
- Surface elevation: 112 ft (34 m)

Lake Cochichewick is a lake in North Andover, Massachusetts that collects water from Weir Hill and other local uplands. Its overflow drains into the Cochichewick River, which joins the Merrimack. Brooks School, a private co-educational prep school, is located on the shores of the lake.

== Etymology ==
The name for Lake Cochichewick reportedly comes from the Pennacook word for "dashing stream" or "place of the great cascade" and during the early years of Andover it was called "The Great Pond".

== Public access restrictions ==
For the past century, Lake Cochichewick has been North Andover's main supply of drinking water and public access to the lake was forbidden. In May 2002, however, the town began issuing boating permits:

Boating on the lake is limited to watercraft designed to be manually propelled by oars or paddles, or the use of electric motors (maximum length of motorized craft is 15 feet). Rowing shells, johnboats, dinghies, rowboats, sail boats, canoes and kayaks with cockpits are acceptable as long as the occupants are isolated from contact with the lake. Boats must not have any thru-holes (e.g., self-bailers) that would allow contact between the occupants and the lake water. Inflatable boats, windsurfers, paddleboards, sit-on-top kayaks and seaplanes are not allowed.

Swimming is not allowed on Lake Cochichewick, neither for humans nor dogs. The town has posted signs along the trails near the lake informing hikers that it is used for drinking water, and that swimming is a noncriminal offence, punishable with a $50 fine.

== Public health issues ==
As the Merrimack Valley was once highly industrialized, there has been concern about the levels of contaminants such as mercury in Lake Cochichewick and other local waters. However, recent tests have shown a significant drop in mercury levels in fish such as yellow perch and largemouth bass. A spokesperson for the state Department of Environmental Protection said:

[O]bviously the move to severely restrict mercury emissions from trash incinerators as well as closing down all state medical waste incinerators really has had a positive impact. ... It takes a long time for mercury to build up in the environment, and our thought is that it will take quite a bit of time to leave the environment. ... This is showing us that in a relatively short period of time we can have some dramatic reductions.
