= Brooks School =

Private prep school in North Andover, Massachusetts, US

Location
- 1160 Great Pond Road; North Andover, Massachusetts 01845; United States; 42°42′20″N 71°5′9″W

Information
- School type: Private, day & boarding, college-prep
- Motto: VICTURI TE SALUTAMUS ("We greet thee, we, about to live.”) (We, who are about to be victorious, salute you)
- Religious affiliation: Episcopal Church
- Established: 1926
- Head of school: John R. Packard
- Faculty: 65
- Gender: Coeducational
- Enrollment: 353 (2022-23)
- Average class size: 11
- Student to teacher ratio: 5:1
- Campus size: 270 acres (1.1 km^{2})
- Campus type: Suburban
- Colors: Green and black
- Athletics: 15 varsity sports; 48 teams
- Athletics conference: Independent School League
- Rival: The Governor's Academy
- Newspaper: The Brooksian
- Endowment: $101.9 million
- Tuition: $82,650 (boarding) $68,525 (day) (2026-2027)
- Website: www.brooksschool.org

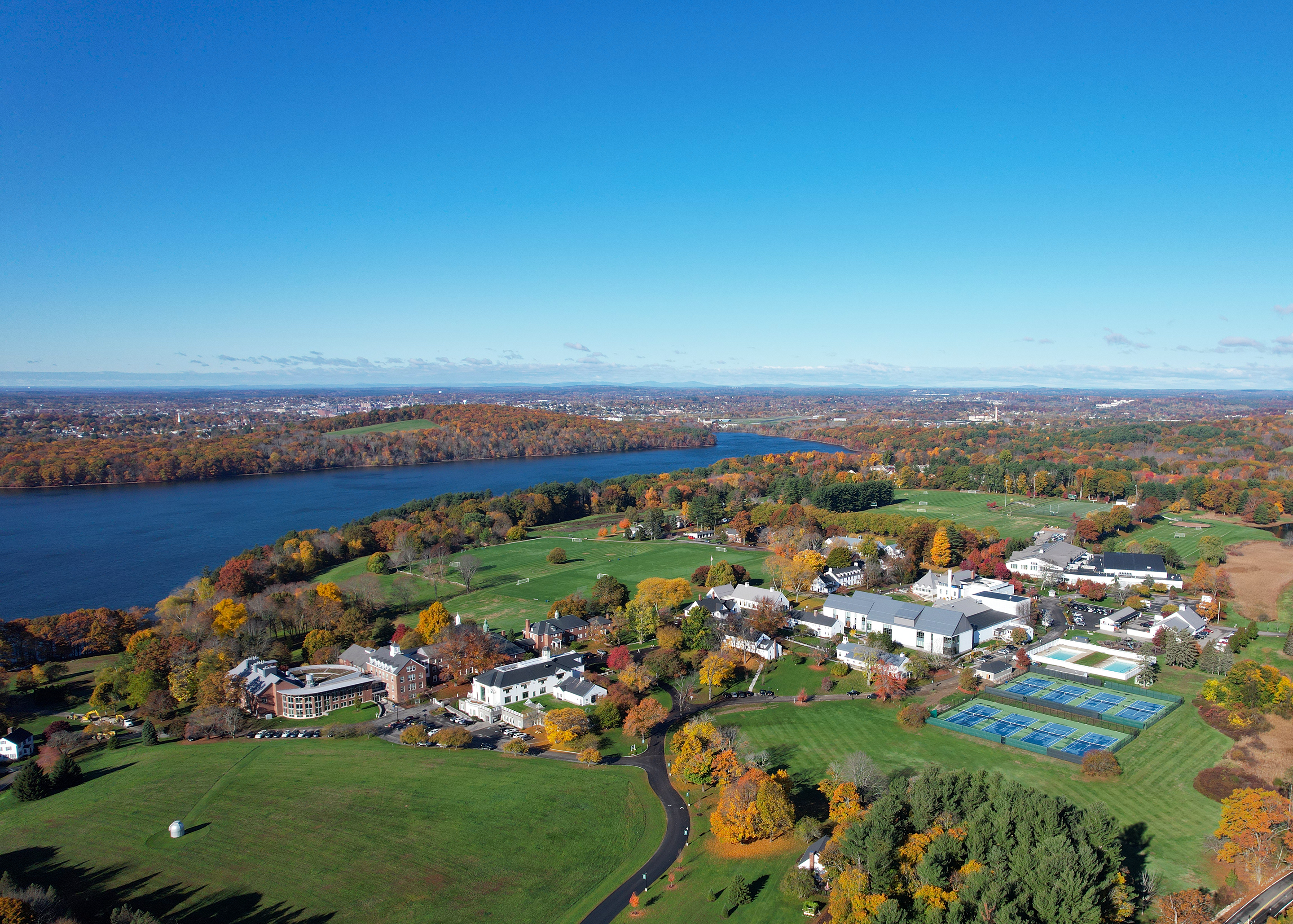
Brooks School

Brooks School is a private, co-educational, college-preparatory boarding school in North Andover, Massachusetts, United States, on the shores of Lake Cochichewick.

== History ==
Brooks School was founded in 1926 by Endicott Peabody, who had previously established Groton School in 1884. It was named after Phillips Brooks (1835–1893), a well-known clergyman and author who spent summers in North Andover, Massachusetts, and briefly served as the Episcopal Bishop of Massachusetts during the 1890s. Other founders included Harvard professor Roger Bigelow Merriman and Charles Slattery, the acting (and future) Bishop of Massachusetts.

The school opened on September 29, 1927, with thirty boys in the first and second forms (seventh and eighth grades), two masters, a headmaster and headmistress, and one dormitory. The school added one form (grade) each year thereafter until it comprised grades 7–12, denoted by the British educational notations, Forms I, II, III, IV, V, and VI, respectively. Forms I and II (seventh and eighth grades) were later dropped.

Brooks School has had just one head of school in over 80 years.

- Frank D. Ashburn was appointed at the age of 25 and served for 46 years until his retirement in 1973.
- H. Peter Aitken served from 1973 to 1986.
- Lawrence W. Becker (previously the assistant headmaster of Hotchkiss School) served from 1986 to 2008.
- John R. Packard (previously the faculty dean of Brooks) became head of school in 2008.

The school started admitting day students in the early 1950s and became co-educational in 1979.

In the 21st century, Brooks has focused on renovating the campus. New buildings include the arts center, the science center, the admissions building, and a crew boathouse on Lake Cochichewick.

== Student body ==
In the 2022-23 school year, Brooks enrolled 353 students (76 freshmen, 83 sophomores, 92 juniors, and 102 seniors). 68.9% of Brooks students live on campus; the other 30% commute to Brooks from surrounding communities in Massachusetts and New Hampshire.

30% of Brooks students identify as people of color. In the 2021-22 school year, of the 351 Brooks students, 249 (70.9%) were white, 42 (12.0%) were Asian, 23 (6.6%) were black, 20 (5.7%) were Hispanic, 3 (0.9%) were Native Hawaiian/Pacific Islander, 1 (0.3%) was Native American, and 13 (3.7%) were multiracial.

== Finances ==
=== Tuition and financial aid ===
Tuition for the 2023-24 school year is $73,400 for boarding students and $90,300 for day students. 35% of the student body is on financial aid, and the average aid grant is $49,000. In 2023, 122 Brooks families received financial aid grants; after deducting financial aid, 33 families paid between $0 and $5,000 for tuition, and another 19 families paid under $10,000. 38 families receiving aid had family incomes under $100,000/year.

=== Endowment and expenses ===
Brooks' financial endowment stands at $123.7 million. In its Internal Revenue Service filings for the 2021-22 school year, Brooks reported total assets of $196.7 million, net assets of $142.4 million, investment holdings of $83.6 million, and cash holdings of $17.6 million. Brooks also reported $27.2 million in program service expenses and $6.2 million in grants (primarily student financial aid).

The school completed a $60 million fundraising campaign in 2008. It is currently conducting the Centennial Campaign, which seeks to raise $80 million for various initiatives, including $30 million in endowment funds for financial aid and $10 million to support faculty salaries.

== Notable alumni ==
- Barry Bingham Jr. '54, publisher of the Louisville Courier-Journal
- Molly Bingham '86, journalist and filmmaker
- Frank Blake '67, CEO and chairman of Home Depot
- Doug Burden '83, rower, 1992 Olympic silver medalist and 1988 Olympic bronze medalist
- Jake Burton Carpenter, founder and chairman of Burton Snowboards
- Bill Chisholm '87, Businessman and owner of the Boston Celtics
- Gene Clapp '68, rower, 1972 Olympic silver medalist
- Charlie Davies '04, soccer player
- Peter B. de Menocal '78, president of the Woods Hole Oceanographic Institution
- Archduke Dominic of Austria, Royal Prince of Hungary and Bohemia, Prince of Tuscany, a contested claimant to the Spanish throne
- William R. Ferris '60, chairman of the National Endowment for the Humanities
- Steve Forbes '66, editor-in-chief of Forbes magazine; ran for president in 1996 and 2000
- Pat Freiermuth '18, football player
- Mike Fucito '04, soccer player
- Eric M. Genden '83, professor at the Icahn School of Medicine at Mount Sinai
- Robert L. Gerry III '56, petroleum executive
- Charles Jencks '57, architect
- William W. Kellogg '35, president of the American Meteorological Society
- John LeBoutillier '71, member of the U.S. House of Representatives
- Nekima Levy Armstrong '94, community activist and law professor
- Elle Logan '06, rower; 2008, 2012, 2016 Olympic gold medalist
- Esmond Bradley Martin '59, conservationist
- Taina Mair '22, former college basketball player for Boston College and Duke University, WNBA player for the Seattle Storm
- Lughano Nyondo '24, soccer player
- Anthony Perkins, actor, notably Norman Bates in Psycho
- Thomas Collier Platt, Jr. '43, chief judge of the U.S. District Court for the Eastern District of New York
- Trevor Potter '74, chairman of the Federal Election Commission
- Tim Prentice '49, sculptor
- Theodore Sedgwick '66, U.S. ambassador to Slovakia
- Lorenzo Semple Jr. '40, screenwriter, notably Batman and Three Days of the Condor
- Mark Shuttleworth (exchange student), founder of Canonical, the company developing the Linux Ubuntu operating system; first African in space
- Richard V. Spencer '72, U.S. Secretary of the Navy
- Wells Stabler '37, U.S. ambassador to Spain
- Parker Stevenson '71, actor, notably The Hardy Boys and Baywatch
- Michael Weatherly '86, actor, notably NCIS
