= 1876 Greenback National Convention =

American political convention

- 1876 presidential election
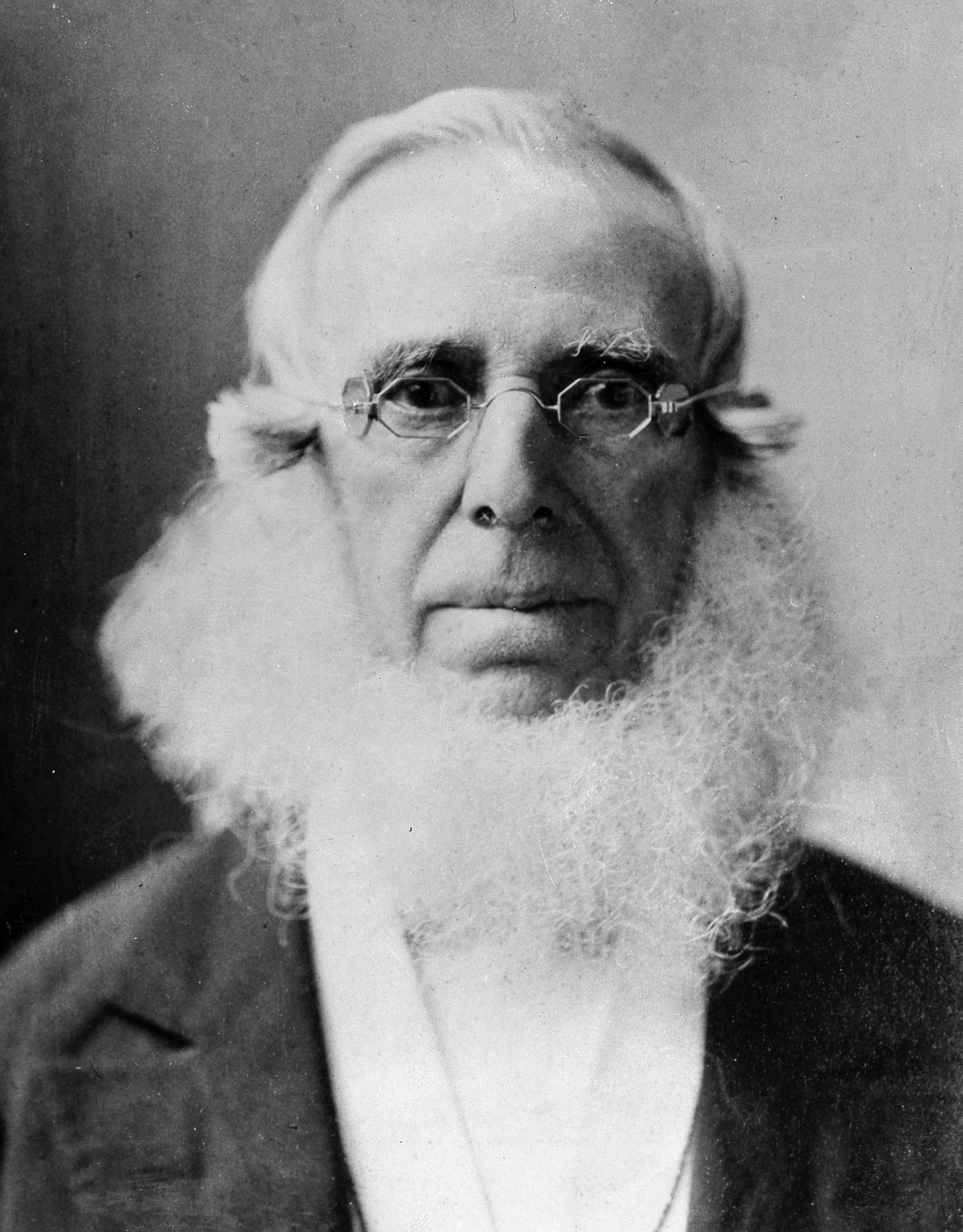
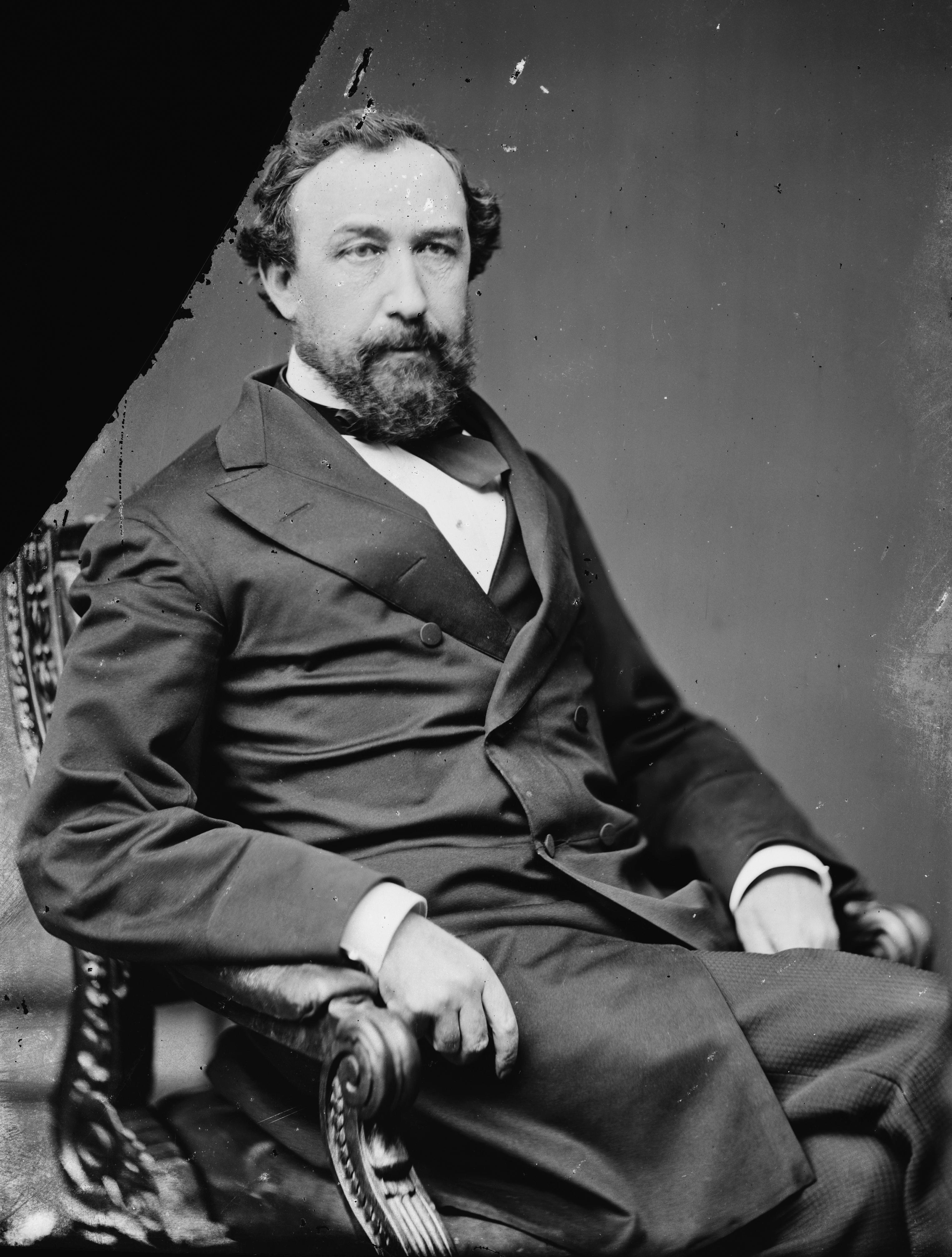
- Nominees; Cooper and Booth

Convention
- Dates: May 28–29, 1876
- City: Indianapolis, Indiana

Candidates
- Presidential nominee: Peter Cooper of New York
- Vice-presidential nominee: Newton Booth of California

The 1876 Greenback National Convention was held in Indianapolis in the spring of 1876. The Greenback Party had been organized by agricultural interests in Indianapolis in 1874 to urge the federal government to inflate the economy through the mass issuance of paper money called greenbacks. Peter Cooper was nominated for president with 352 votes to 119 for three other contenders. The convention nominated anti-monopolist Senator Newton Booth of California for vice-president; after Booth declined to run, the national committee chose Samuel Fenton Cary as his replacement on the ticket. Cooper was 85 years old at the time of his nomination, thus the oldest person ever nominated by a political party to serve as President of the United States.

Candidates:

- Peter Cooper, U.S. philanthropist from New York
- Andrew Curtin, former governor of Pennsylvania
- William Allen, former governor of Ohio
- Alexander Campbell, U.S. representative from Illinois

== Candidates gallery ==
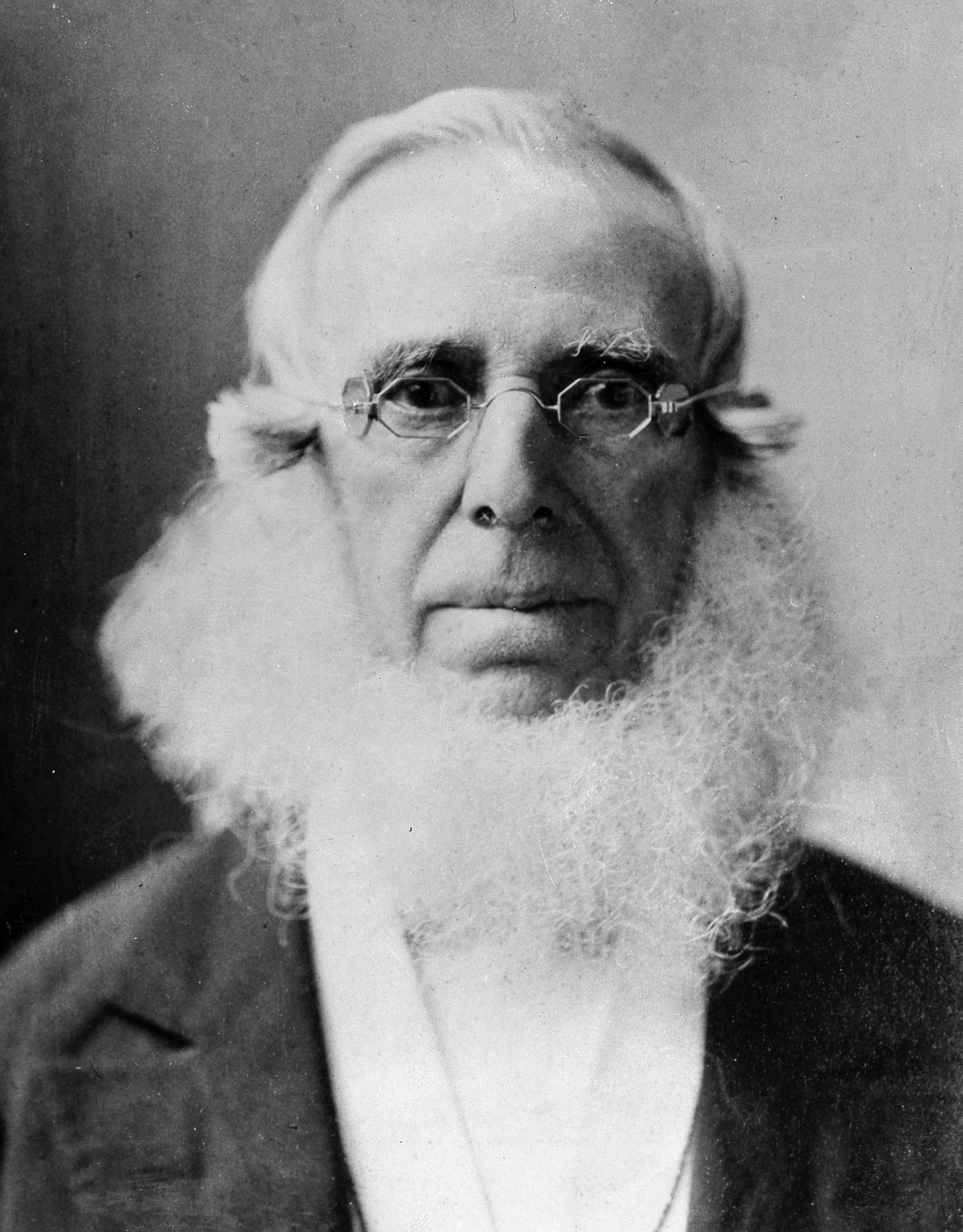
Philanthropist Peter Cooper from New York

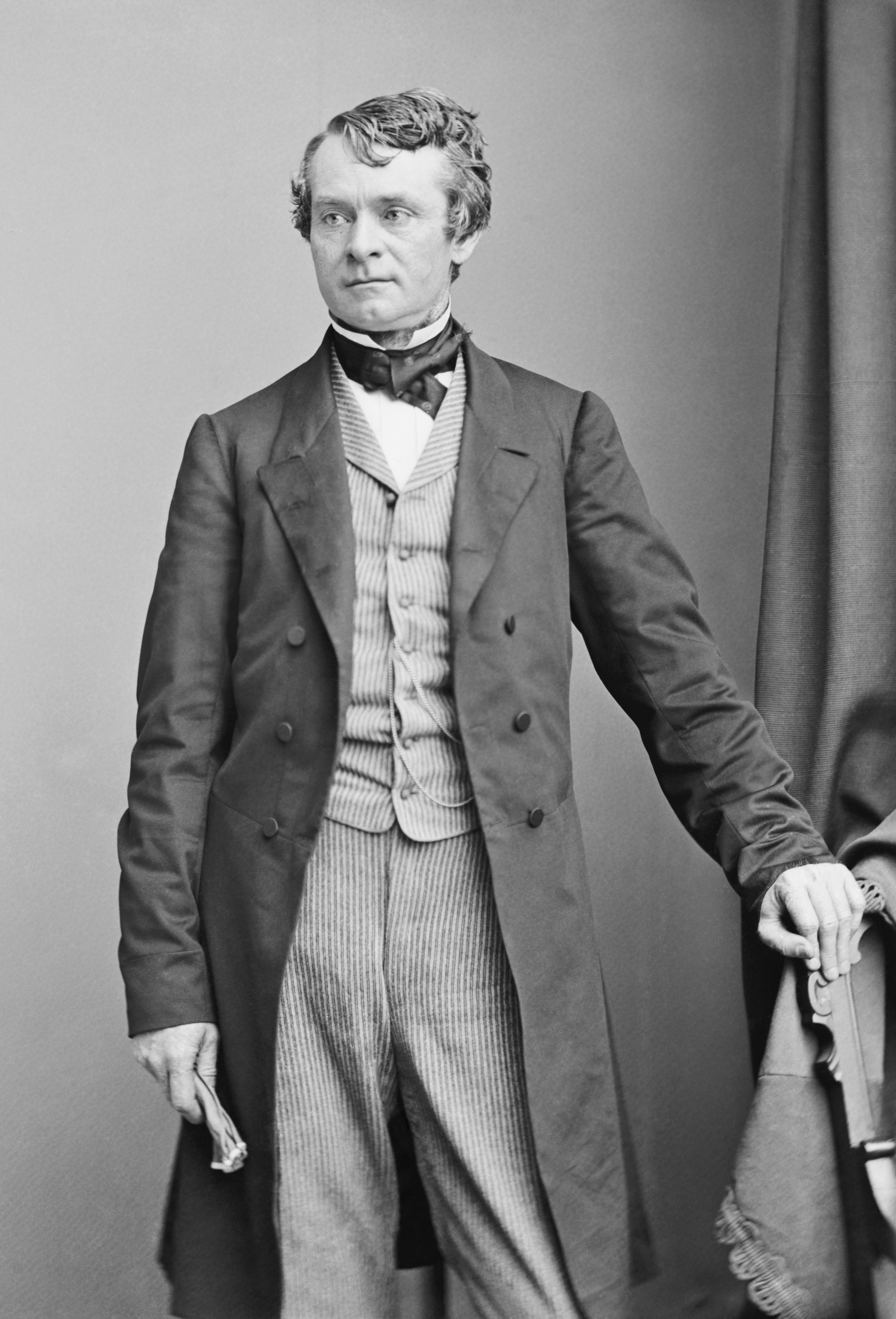
Andrew Curtin from Pennsylvania

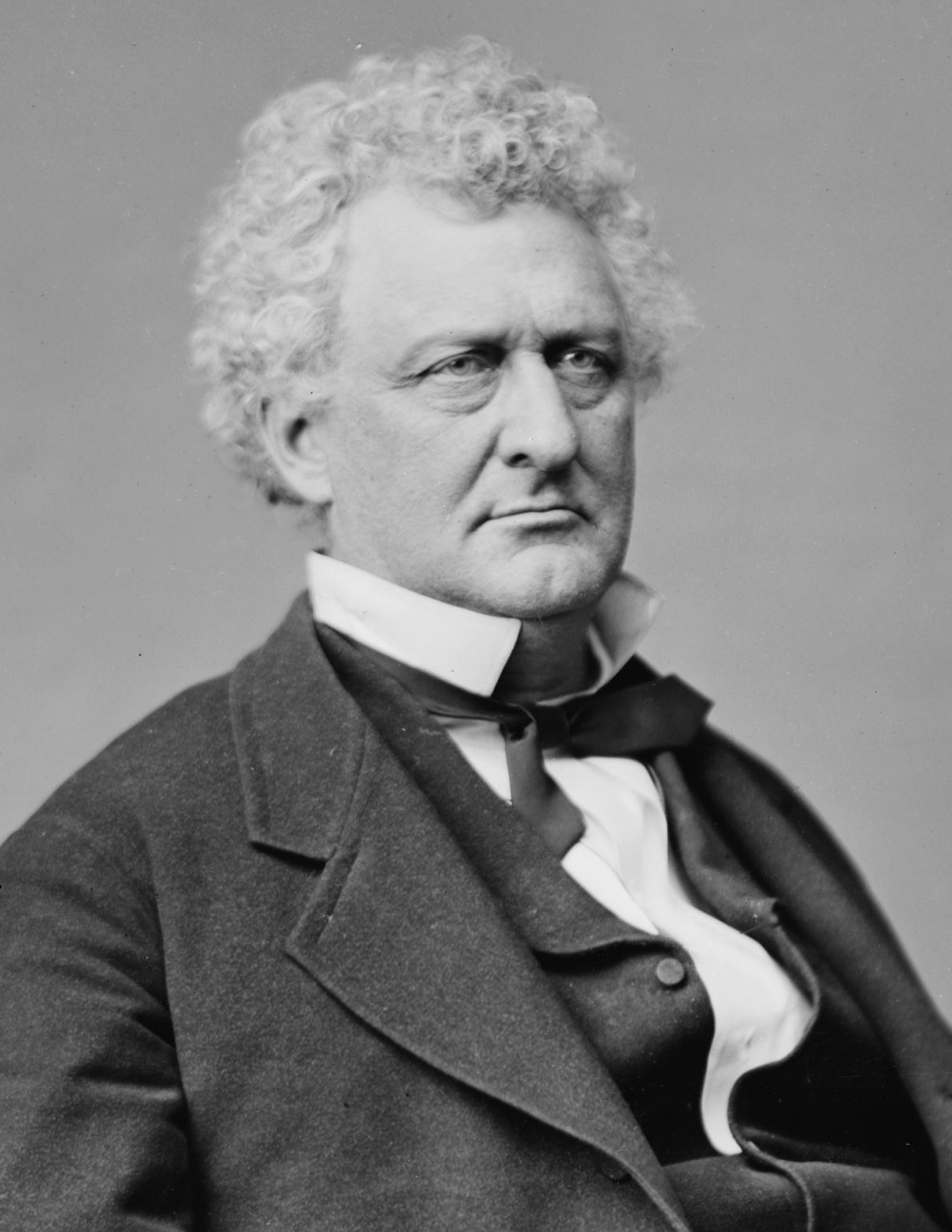
William Allen from Ohio

The Greenback Party had been organized by agricultural interests in Indianapolis in 1874 to urge the federal government to inflate the economy through the mass issuance of paper money called greenbacks. Their first national nominating convention was held in Indianapolis in the spring of 1876. Peter Cooper was nominated for president with 352 votes to 119 for three other contenders. The convention nominated anti-monopolist Senator Newton Booth of California for vice-president; after Booth declined to run, the national committee chose Samuel Fenton Cary as his replacement on the ticket. Cooper was 85 years old at the time of his nomination, thus the oldest person ever nominated by a political party to serve as President of the United States.

Presidential Ballot
| Ballot | 1st |
| Peter Cooper | 352 |
| Andrew Curtin | 58 |
| William Allen | 31 |
| Alexander Campbell | 30 |

Source: US President - G Convention. Our Campaigns. (February 10, 2012).
