= Alice Moore McComas =

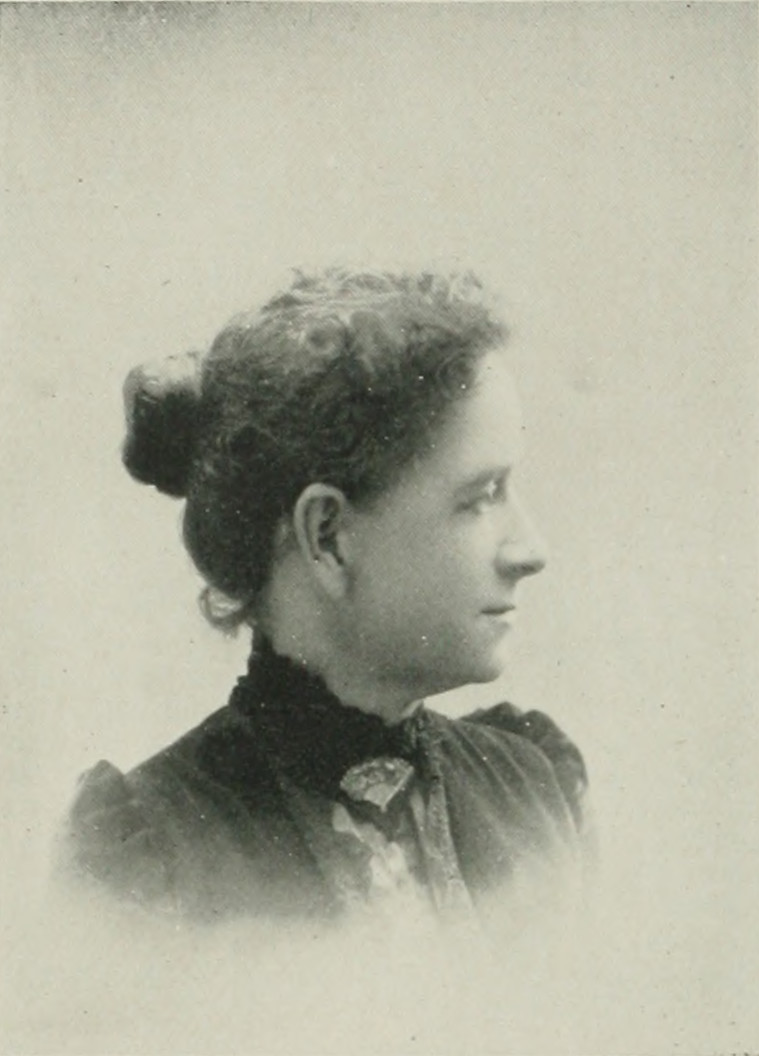
- Photo in A Woman of the Century
- Born: Alice Moore; June 18, 1850; Paris, Illinois, US
- Died: December 19, 1919 (aged 69); Los Angeles, California, US
- Education: Saint Mary-of-the-Woods College
- Occupations: author, editor, lecturer, reformer
- Spouse: Charles C. McComas (m. 1871)
- Writing career
- Language: English
- Notable works: The Women of the Canal Zone, Under the Peppers

Alice Moore McComas (née, Moore; June 18, 1850 – December 19, 1919) was an American author, editor, lecturer and reformer. She was a pioneer suffragist in California and served as president of the Los Angeles Equal Suffrage Association. During the various suffrage campaigns, McComas contributed articles to over seventy newspapers and magazines, and she was well known throughout the west as an educator and lecturer. She was accredited with being the first woman to conduct a department for women in a daily paper in California, and the first woman to address a state Republican ratification meeting. She was one of the earliest organizers of the Free Kindergarten Association and of clubs for working women, and was prominent in many movements for civic welfare. She was Associate Editor of The Household Journal of California and author of several books, among them The Women of the Canal Zone and Under the Peppers. McComas contributed travel sketches to many magazines.

== Early life and education ==
Alice Moore was born in Paris, Illinois, June 18, 1850. Her father, the Gen. Jesse Hale Moore, scholar, clergyman, soldier and statesman, who died while serving his government as United States Consul in Callao, Peru, was at the time of her birth, president of the Paris academy. He came of an old Virginia family whose ancestors were noted for their participation in the wars of 1776 and 1812. Her mother, Rachel (Hines) Moore, a native of Kentucky, was a daughter of one of Kentucky's prominent families, which included the clergyman, William H. Thompson, and the Indiana jurist, John W. Thompson. From both sides of her family, she inherited literary taste.

From the age of eight, she had her own opinions on social and religious questions, and often astonished her elders with profound questionings, which brought upon her the name of "peculiar". Her aggressiveness as she became older, in clinging to those opinions, even when very unpopular, added to that the opprobrium, "self-willed and headstrong." During the Civil War, in which nearly all the male relatives and friends, including her future husband, had enlisted for the defense of the Union, she commenced the study of politics. At that time, she read of the woman's rights movement. While she had not the courage openly to advocate a thing considered and pronounced "unwomanly" by many in her circle, her nature rebelled against the inequality of the sexes. In school, she traded compositions for worked-out mathematical problems, averaging many terms from six to ten compositions weekly on as many different subjects, changing her style so as to escape detection.

At fifteen, her ambition to achieve something over-ruled her better judgment, for, thinking there was little opportunity for a Methodist minister's daughter, her father being then presiding elder of the Decatur, Illinois, District, to make more of herself or to see the world, she left home one Sunday evening, ostensibly to attend church, but in fact to take the train for St. Louis to make her own fortune. There she immediately secured a situation in a dry goods store at US$8 a week. After one delightful week of complete freedom and self-reliance, she was persuaded to give up her situation and her dream of fighting the world alone and single-handed. Much against her will, she returned and resumed her home life with a feeling of disappointment from which she never entirely recovered, for she inwardly rebelled against the stereotyped, formal and empty life a girl in her social position was compelled to live. Her main solace was in writing stories and poems, many of which were destroyed as soon as written. Others she sent secretly and anonymously to papers and magazines. Her education was finished at Saint Mary-of-the-Woods College, special honors in music and literary composition, prize winner in elocution.

== Career ==
After leaving school, she attended to the social duties required of a family in a prominent position, her father at that time being the representative in Congress of the seventh congressional district of Illinois.

In Decatur, Illinois, on November 14, 1870, she married Judge Charles C. McComas, and for the next five years she devoted herself to the duties of wife, mother and housekeeper. Their children were: Helen (1872–1891); Alice Beach (b. 1876), Clare (b. 1881); and Carroll (b. 1886). Financial disaster consequent on the panic of 1876 took away their home and property. Her husband, believing that he could quickly retrieve his lost fortune in a new place, emigrated to Kansas, where his wife and family, consisting of two daughters, joined him in 1877. She there resumed writing, which brought her a small income, but she concealed her identity under a pen name when writing for fiction and poetry.

After her removal to Los Angeles, California, in 1887, she began to write over her own name. She edited, with occasional interruptions, a woman's department in the Los Angeles Evening Express. She became a member of the Pacific Coast Women's Press Association. During 1891 and 1893, she filled the position of vice-president of the National Woman Suffrage Association, first vice-president of the Ladies' Annex to the Los Angeles Area Chamber of Commerce, and member of the board of directors of the Women's Educational and Industrial Union. During her term as president of the California suffrage society, the first county suffrage convention was held in the state. She secured the promise of a land donation for a public park in her neighborhood, on condition that the city would improve it, and took the matter before the city council, urging that body in a stirring speech to accept the gift, and by diligent and persistent work, finally securing an appropriation of US$10,000.

McComas contributed to over 70 newspapers on the suffrage question; originated the "Precinct" idea in woman suffrage campaigning; and wrote a brochure, "The Timely Question", on the same subject. She was a correspondent for three California papers during the World's Fair, and was a special contributor of travel sketches in the Los Angeles Times and various magazines. She completed a book on child life in California, Under the Peppers; was a writer of short stories, articles on politics and economics; and served as associate editor of the Pacific Household Journal.

She occasionally addressed a public audience. Her lecturers included topics of, Politics in the Home, Individual Education in the Public Schools, and The Common Sense Rearing of Children. She made a tour of thorough investigation at the Panama Canal; lectured on that subject in 1914; and published a book, The Women of the Canal Zone.

== Personal life ==
McComas was a member of the American Play-goers; Ethical Society; Woman's Press Association, San Francisco; California Club of New York; and the Friday Morning Club, Los Angeles.

For several years, she lived at 440 Riverside Drive, New York City with her daughter Carroll, an actress, but when the latter went abroad as an entertainer with the A. E. F., McComas returned to California where she resumed active management of her ranch in San Dimas. When she was taken sick in the summer of 1919, her daughter who had just returned from overseas, joined her, and a few weeks later, when recovery began to seem uncertain, her eldest daughter, Mrs. Alice Gray of Brooklyn was sent for. McComas died December 19, 1919, at the Los Angeles Hospital of complications following an attack of acute indigestion.
