= William S. Case =

American judge (1863–1921)

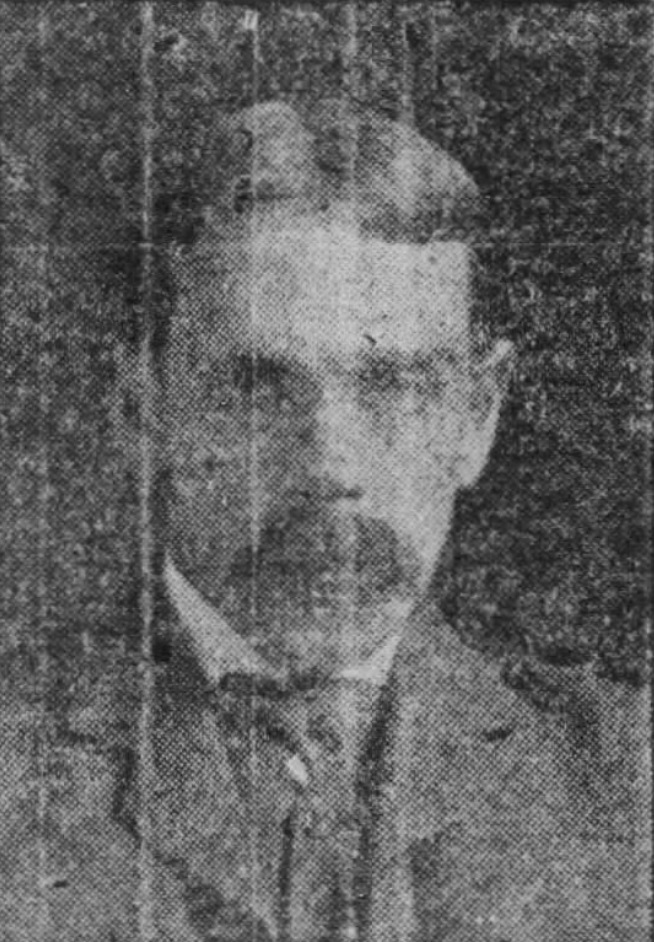
Judge William S. Case in 1919

William Scoville Case (June 27, 1863 – February 28, 1921) was a Connecticut lawyer, author, and judge who served as an associate justice of the Connecticut Supreme Court from 1919 to 1921.

== Early life, education, and career ==
Born at Tariffville, Connecticut to distinguished Connecticut lawyer William Cullen Case and Margaret Turnbull Case, the family moved to Granby, Connecticut, during Case's childhood. He prepared for college at the Hopkins School in New Haven, graduating in 1881, and received an B.A. from Yale College in 1885, where he was a member of the Psi Upsilon fraternity, the Scroll and Key society, and served as managing editor of the Yale Record. He thereafter read law for two years in his father's office in New Haven to gain admission to the bar in Hartford County, Connecticut, in 1887.

He was legislative clerk of bills in the Connecticut legislature in 1887 and 1889, and was law clerk in the United States Patent Office from 1891 to 1893. In 1895, he published a novel, Forward House, which was well received, and which was profiled by Yale professor William Lyon Phelps for the Boston magazine, Writer. Case also wrote a history of Granby, Connecticut, included in J. Hammond Trumbull's Memorial History of Hartford County.

== Judicial service ==
Case served as a judge in some capacity for 24 years, having succeeded the late Judge David S. Calhoun as judge of the court of common pleas for Hartford county in 1897. In October 1901, he was appointed judge of the superior court by Governor George P. McLean.

On August 23, 1919, Governor Marcus H. Holcomb appointed Case to a seat on the state supreme court vacated by the retirement of Alberto T. Roraback. Case remained in that office until his death, 18 months later. Holcomb's successor, Governor Everett J. Lake, appointed Lucien F. Burpee to succeed Case.

== Personal life and death ==
On April 8, 1891, Case married Elizabeth Nichols, daughter of Nathan and Elizabeth Rodman Nichols of Salem, Massachusetts, with whom he had two sons (one of whom died in infancy) and a daughter. Case died of a throat ailment at his home in West Hartford, Connecticut, at the age of 55.

Political offices
Preceded by Alberto T. Roraback	Justice of the Connecticut Supreme Court; 1919–1921	Succeeded by Lucien F. Burpee
