= Jack Fisk =

American art director (born 1945)

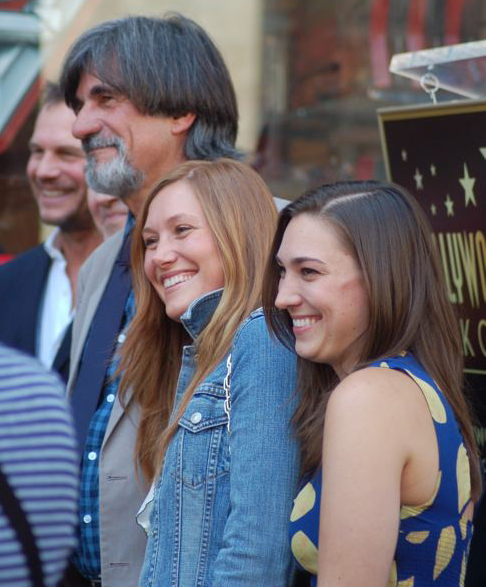
- Fisk (left) with his daughters in 2011
- Born: December 19, 1945 (age 80); Canton, Illinois, U.S.
- Occupations: Set designer, art director, film director
- Years active: 1971–present
- Spouse: Sissy Spacek (m. 1974)
- Children: 2, including Schuyler

Jack Fisk (born December 19, 1945) is an American production designer and director.

As a production designer, he is known for his collaborations with Terrence Malick, designing all of his first eight films, including Badlands (1973), Days of Heaven (1978), The Thin Red Line (1998), and The Tree of Life (2011). He also worked with David Lynch on three films: Eraserhead (1977), The Straight Story (1999), and Mulholland Drive (2001). He was nominated for the Academy Award for Best Production Design for There Will Be Blood (2007), The Revenant (2015), Killers of the Flower Moon (2023), and Marty Supreme (2025). His other credits include Phantom of the Paradise (1974), Carrie (1976), Heart Beat (1980), Water for Elephants (2011), and The Master (2012).

Fisk made his directorial debut with Raggedy Man (1981) and went on to direct the films Violets Are Blue (1986), Daddy's Dyin': Who's Got the Will? (1990), Final Verdict (1991), and two episodes of the television series On the Air (1992).

== Career ==
Fisk was art director on Brian De Palma's Carrie (1976), in which his wife, Sissy Spacek, played the title role. He frequently collaborated with directors Terrence Malick and David Lynch (the latter of whom he knew since childhood). His production design and art director credits include all of Malick's first eight feature films and Lynch's The Straight Story (1999) and Mulholland Drive (2001). He has been nominated for the Academy Award for Best Art Direction four times: for Paul Thomas Anderson's There Will Be Blood, for Alejandro González Iñárritu's The Revenant, for Martin Scorsese's Killers of the Flower Moon, and for Josh Safdie's Marty Supreme.

Fisk appeared in Lynch's Eraserhead (1977) as the Man in the Planet, and the film's credits give "special thanks" to him and to Sissy Spacek (who reputedly held the slates between takes).

Fisk directed Spacek in the films Raggedy Man and Violets Are Blue with Kevin Kline.

== Personal life ==
Fisk met his wife, Spacek, while working on Terrence Malick's 1973 film Badlands, where she portrayed the aloof and distant version of Caril Ann Fugate. They married on April 12, 1974. Together they have two daughters, including Schuyler Fisk.

== Filmography ==
Year	Title	Production role	Director
1971	The Peace Killers	Gaffer	Douglas Schwartz
1971	Angels Hard as They Come	Art director	Joe Viola
1972	Cool Breeze	Art director	Barry Pollack
1973	Messiah of Evil	Art director	Willard Huyck and Gloria Katz
1973	Terminal Island	Art director	Stephanie Rothman
1973	The Slams	Art director	Jonathan Kaplan
1973	Badlands	Art director	Terrence Malick
1974	Phantom of the Paradise	Production designer	Brian De Palma
1975	Darktown Strutters	Production designer	William Witney
1976	Vigilante Force	Art director	George Armitage
1976	Carrie	Art director	Brian De Palma
1977	Death Game	Production designer	Peter S. Traynor
1977	Eraserhead	Actor (Man in the Planet)	David Lynch
1978	Days of Heaven	Production designer	Terrence Malick
1978	Movie Movie	Production designer	Stanley Donen
1980	Heart Beat	Production designer	John Byrum
1981	Raggedy Man	Director	Himself
1986	Violets Are Blue	Director	Himself
1990	Daddy's Dyin': Who's Got the Will?	Director	Himself
1991	Final Verdict	Director	Himself
1992	On the Air	Director (2 episodes)	David Lynch and Mark Frost (creators)
1998	The Thin Red Line	Art director	Terrence Malick
1999	The Straight Story	Production designer	David Lynch
2001	Mulholland Drive	Production designer	David Lynch
2005	The New World	Production designer	Terrence Malick
2007	The Invasion	Production designer	Oliver Hirschbiegel
2007	There Will Be Blood	Production designer	Paul Thomas Anderson
2011	Water for Elephants	Production designer	Francis Lawrence
2011	The Tree of Life	Production designer	Terrence Malick
2012	The Master	Production designer	Paul Thomas Anderson
2012	To the Wonder	Production designer	Terrence Malick
2015	Knight of Cups	Production designer	Terrence Malick
2015	The Revenant	Production designer	Alejandro González Iñárritu
2017	Song to Song	Production designer	Terrence Malick
2022	Causeway	Production designer	Lila Neugebauer
2023	Killers of the Flower Moon	Production designer	Martin Scorsese
2025	Marty Supreme	Production designer	Josh Safdie
TBA	Gold Mountain	Production designer	Ang Lee
