= Franklin Corwin =

American politician

Member of the U.S. House of Representatives from Illinois's 7th district
- In office March 4, 1873 – March 3, 1875
- Preceded by: Jesse Hale Moore
- Succeeded by: Alexander Campbell

Personal details
- Born: January 12, 1818 Lebanon, Ohio, U.S.
- Died: June 15, 1879 (aged 61) Peru, Illinois, U.S.
- Party: Republican

Franklin Corwin (January 12, 1818 – June 15, 1879) was a United States representative from Illinois.

Born in Lebanon, Ohio, he attended private schools, studied law, and was admitted to the bar in 1839, practicing in Wilmington, Ohio. He served in both houses of the Ohio General Assembly. He moved to Peru, Illinois in 1857, and later became a member of the Illinois House of Representatives, serving as speaker.

He was elected as a Republican to the Forty-third Congress, serving from March 4, 1873, to March 3, 1875.

He ran unsuccessfully for reelection in 1874, and resumed the practice of law in Peru. He died there in June 1879, aged 61.

Corwin was the nephew of U.S. Representatives Moses Bledso Corwin and Thomas Corwin.

U.S. House of Representatives
Preceded by Jesse H. Moore	Member of the U.S. House of Representatives from Illinois's 7th congressional district 1873-1875	Succeeded by Alexander Campbell
