= Edward Kellogg =

Edward Kellogg may refer to:

- Edward Kellogg (economist) (1790–1858), American economist and businessman
- Edward Stanley Kellogg (1870–1948), 16th Governor of American Samoa
- Edward W. Kellogg (1883–1960), American inventor
