= Jesse H. Moore =

American politician (1817–1883)

Jesse Hale Moore
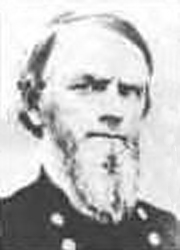

Member of the U.S. House of Representatives from Illinois's 7th district
- In office March 4, 1869 – March 3, 1873
- Preceded by: Henry P. H. Bromwell
- Succeeded by: Franklin Corwin

Personal details
- Born: April 22, 1817 Lebanon, Illinois
- Died: July 11, 1883 (aged 66) Callao, Peru
- Party: Republican

Jesse Hale Moore (April 22, 1817 – July 11, 1883) was a U.S. Representative from Illinois. He also served as an officer in the Union Army during the American Civil War.

== Biography ==
Born near Lebanon, St. Clair County, Illinois, Moore graduated from McKendree College, Lebanon, Illinois, in 1842. He taught school in Nashville, Illinois from 1842 to 1844 and at Georgetown, Illinois from 1844 to 1848. He studied for the ministry and was ordained a Methodist minister in 1849.

Moore served in the Union Army during the American Civil War. He was appointed colonel of the 115th Illinois Volunteer Infantry Regiment on September 13, 1862. Moore led the regiment into its first major action at the Battle of Chickamauga. He participated in the Atlanta campaign and the battles of Franklin and Nashville the following year. He was honorably mustered out June 11, 1865 with a brevet promotion to brigadier general.

Moore served as Presiding elder of the Decatur district of the Illinois conference in 1868 and resided in Decatur, Illinois. He was elected as a Republican to the Forty-first and Forty-second Congresses (March 4, 1869 – March 3, 1873). He served as chairman of the Committee on Invalid Pensions (Forty-second Congress) and was an unsuccessful candidate for renomination in 1872 to the Forty-third Congress.

Later he served as a United States pension agent in Springfield, Illinois from 1873 to 1877. He served as pastor of Mechanicsburg (Illinois) Methodist Church and was appointed by President Arthur as United States consul at Callao, Peru, October 27, 1881, and served until his death there on July 11, 1883. He was interred in Callao, Peru but was reinterred in Greenwood Cemetery, Decatur, Illinois. He had at least one child, a daughter, Alice Moore McComas.

U.S. House of Representatives
Preceded by Henry P. H. Bromwell	Member of the U.S. House of Representatives from Illinois's 7th congressional district 1869-1873	Succeeded by Franklin Corwin
