= Charles Kellogg =

Charles Kellogg may refer to:

- Charles Kellogg (congressman) (1773–1842), U.S. Representative from New York
- Charles Kellogg (cross-country skier) (1940–2015), American Olympic skier
- Charles Kellogg (naturalist) (1868–1949), vaudeville performer and campaigner for the protection of the giant sequoias
- Charles Kellogg (state senator) (1839–1903), New York politician
