= Daniel Kellogg =

Daniel Kellogg may refer to:

- Daniel Kellogg (composer) (born 1976), American composer
- Daniel Kellogg (judge) (1791–1875), American judge in Vermont
- Daniel Kellogg (settler) (1630–1688), founding settler of Norwalk, Connecticut
