= 115th Illinois Infantry Regiment =

115th Regiment Illinois Volunteer Infantry
- Active: September 13, 1862 - June 23, 1865
- Country: United States
- Allegiance: Union
- Branch: Infantry
- Engagements: Tullahoma Campaign; Battle of Chickamauga; Chattanooga campaign Battle of Wauhatchie; Atlanta campaign Battle of Resaca; Battle of Dallas; Battle of New Hope Church; Battle of Allatoona; Battle of Kennesaw Mountain; Siege of Atlanta; Battle of Jonesborough; Battle of Lovejoy's Station; Buzzard's Roost Gap (one company); Battle of Franklin; Battle of Nashville

The 115th Illinois Volunteer Infantry was an infantry regiment in the Union Army during the American Civil War.

== History ==
The 115th Illinois Infantry was organized at Camp Butler and mustered in for three years service on September 13, 1862, under the command of Colonel Jesse Hale Moore.

The regiment was attached to 2nd Brigade, 3rd Division, Army of Kentucky, Department of the Ohio, to February 1862. 2nd Brigade, Baird's 3rd Division, Army of the Kentucky, Department of the Cumberland, to June 1863. 1st Brigade, 1st Division, Reserve Corps, Army of the Cumberland, to October 1863. 1st Brigade, 2nd Division, IV Corps, October 1863. 2nd Brigade, 1st Division, IV Corps, to June 1865.

The 115th Illinois Infantry mustered out of service on June 11, 1865, at Nashville, Tennessee, and discharged at Camp Butler on June 23, 1865.

== Detailed service ==
Moved to Cincinnati, Ohio, and Covington, Kentucky, October 4–6, 1862. Duty at Covington, until October 20, 1862, operating against Heth's threatened attack on Cincinnati. March to Richmond, Kentucky, October 20–25, then to Danville, Kentucky December 21, and duty there until January 26, 1863. Pursuit of Morgan to Lebanon Junction December 26–31, 1862. Moved to Louisville, Kentucky, January 26–31, 1863, then to Nashville, Tennessee, January 31-February 8. Repulse of Wheeler's attack on Fort Donelson, Tennessee, February 4. At Nashville until March 5. Moved to Franklin, Tennessee, and pursuit of Earl Van Dorn March 5–12. Spring Hill March 10. At Brentwood March 27-April 8. Return to Franklin April 8, and repulse of Van Dorn's attack April 10. At Franklin until June 2. Moved to Triune June 2. Action at Triune with Wheeler June 11. Tullahoma Campaign June 24-July 7. At Wartrace July 3-August 12, and at Elk River until September 7. Chickamauga Campaign September 7–22. Ringgold, Georgia, September 17. Battle of Chickamauga, September 19–20. Siege of Chattanooga September 24-October 26. Reopening Tennessee River October 26–29. Battle of Wauhatchie, Tennessee, October 28–29. Duty in Lookout Valley until December 1. At Nickajack Cove, Georgia, until February 1864. Demonstration on Dalton, Georgia, February 22–27. Tunnel Hill, Buzzard's Roost Gap and Rocky Faced Ridge February 23–25. At Cleveland, Tennessee, March and April. Atlanta Campaign May 1-September 8. Tunnel Hill May 6–7. Demonstration on Rocky Faced Ridge May 8–11. Buzzard's Roost Gap May 8–9. Demonstrations on Dalton May 9–13. Battle of Resaca May 14–15. Near Kingston May 18–19. Near Cassville May 19. Advance on Dallas May 22–25. Operations on line of Pumpkin Vine Creek and battles about Dallas, New Hope Church, and Allatoona Hills May 25-June 5. Operations about Marietta and against Kennesaw Mountain June 10-July 2. Pine Hill June 11–14. Lost Mountain June 15–17. Assault on Kennesaw June 27. Ruff's Station, Smyrna Camp Ground, July 4. Chattahoochie River July 5–17. Peach Tree Creek July 19–20. Siege of Atlanta July 22-August 25. Flank movement on Jonesboro August 25–30. Battle of Jonesboro August 31-September 1. Lovejoy's Station September 2–6. Operations against Hood in northern Georgia and northern Alabama September 29-November 3. Buzzard's Roost Block House October 13 (one company). Nashville Campaign November–December. Columbia, Tennessee, December 23. Columbia, Duck River, November 24–27. Battle of Franklin November 30. Battle of Nashville December 15–16. Pursuit of Hood to the Tennessee River December 17–28. Moved to Huntsville, Alabama, and duty there until March 1865. Expedition to Bull's Gap and operations in eastern Tennessee March 20-April 22. Moved to Nashville, Tennessee, and duty there until June.

== Casualties ==
The regiment lost a total of 213 men during its service; 6 officers and 58 enlisted men killed or mortally wounded, 2 officers and 147 enlisted men died of disease.

== Commanders ==
- Colonel Jesse Hale Moore

== Notable members ==
- Captain Samuel Hymer, Company D - Medal of Honor recipient for action at Buzzard Roost's Gap

== See also ==
- List of Illinois Civil War units
- Illinois in the Civil War
