= Edward Kellogg (economist) =

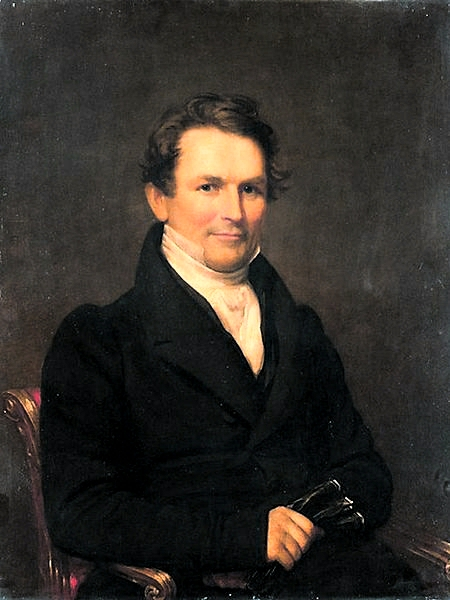
Edward Kellogg (1831) Portrait by Samuel Lovett Waldo and William Jewett

Edward Kellogg (October 18, 1790, in Norwalk, Connecticut – April 29, 1858, in New York) was a businessman and economist. Influenced by his experience in the Panic of 1837, he became an early advocate of fiat money. His ideas later influenced the Greenback movement and the Populist Party.

== Life and career ==
After a brief stint in business in Norwalk, he relocated to New York City and established Edward Kellogg & Co., a wholesale dry goods firm, which he operated until 1837. By that time, he was heavily invested in real estate in Brooklyn and moved his family there to facilitate the management of his properties. This, together with his financial studies, would occupy most of his time for the remainder of his life.

== Economic ideas ==
Following the Panic of 1837, he began to think about the monetary system and he believed it was faulted. He was especially concerned about interest, which could often reach usurious levels. His first proposal was that all paper money should be issued by the government. (At that time, most banks issued their own private paper notes.) The government's notes would be low interest and backed by real estate. Simultaneously, the government would issue bonds (at the same interest rate) that could be exchanged for the notes. This, he believed, would keep interest rates tied to actual economic growth. The notes could also be redeemed for gold or silver, twice yearly, and would be insured by a National Safety Fund.

In 1843, Horace Greeley, editor of the New York Tribune, convinced Kellogg to publish his opinions. They were issued in tabloid form under the title "Usury: the Evil and Remedy". With a few additions and changes, it was reprinted the next year as a pamphlet, under the pseudonym Godek Gardwell, and renamed "Currency: the Evil and Remedy". In 1849, it was given the title "Labor and Other Capital" and published as a book. His daughter put out a new edition in 1861, and it was retitled again, as "A New Monetary System",

== Influence on later movements ==
During his own lifetime, Kellogg's ideas garnered interest from Greeley and some other public figures, but they never came close to being adopted. Kellogg's proposals gained new attention during the American Civil War, when the United States began printing banknotes as a matter of wartime necessity. After the war, Alexander Campbell adopted aspects of Kellogg's proposals, calling for the permanent usage of fiat money. Campbell's approach served as the intellectual basis for the rise of the Greenback movement and would later influence the Populist Party.

== Bibliography ==
- Edward Kellogg (1861). A new monetary system: the only means of securing the respective rights of labor and property, and of protecting the public from financial revulsions. Rudd & Carleton.
- Labor and Other Capital, reissued (1971) by A. M. Kelley, ISBN 0-678-00803-5
- Chester McArthur Destler (1932). The Influence of Edward Kellogg Upon American Radicalism, 1865-1896.
