= J. Henry Roraback =

American politician (1870–1937)

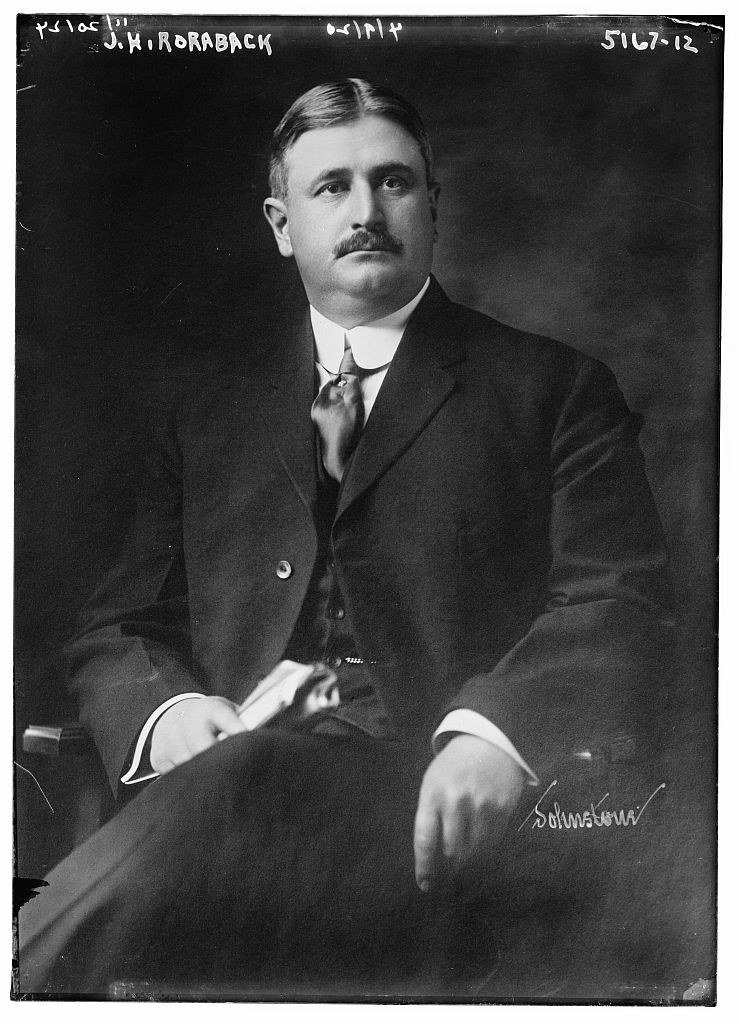

Chairman of the Connecticut Republican Party
- In office April 17, 1912 – May 19, 1937
- Preceded by: Michael Kenealy
- Succeeded by: Benjamin Harwood

Personal details
- Born: John Henry Roraback; April 5, 1870 Sheffield, Massachusetts, U.S.
- Died: May 19, 1937 (aged 67) Harwinton, Connecticut, U.S.
- Party: Republican
- Spouse: Mary L. Parsons (m. 1896)
- Children: 3
- Relatives: Alberto T. Roraback (brother), Catherine Roraback (grand niece)

John Henry Roraback (April 5, 1870 – May 19, 1937) was an American lawyer, businessman, and Republican political boss in the state of Connecticut. He was one of the most influential figures in early 20th century Connecticut, and had a national impact as well.

== Early life ==
Roraback's parents John C. and Maria Roraback were farmers. His father was descended from German immigrants from one of several settlements named "Rohrbach" in Lorraine who had settled in Columbia County, New York around 1700. The family moved to Sheffield, Massachusetts in the Berkshires around 1846. Henry (as he seems to have been usually called) was born on April 5, 1870 in Sheffield, Massachusetts. He was educated in the local Sheffield schools and then attended high school in Great Barrington. At 19 he moved to North Canaan, Connecticut, where a number of his much older siblings were already established. Living with a sister there, he taught school nearby and studied law with his brother Alberto T. Roraback (1849-1923), a lawyer then serving as a county judge. He was admitted to the bar in 1892. He became a partner in his brother's prosperous practice.

== Political career ==
Roraback became the chairman of the Republican Town Committee in Canaan and promoted his brother's successful candidacy for the state House of Representatives in 1895. In 1898 he was elected to the Republican State Committee. In 1900 he supported George P. McLean for governor over Donald T. Warner (son of his brother's old mentor Judge Donald J. Warner) and carried Warner's own district for McLean. In 1909 Roraback managed Ebenezer Hill's campaign for the US Senate and nearly unseated Frank Brandegee. In 1910 he managed McLean's successful campaign for the Senate. In 1912 he became Republican state party chairman - a post he retained until his death in 1937.

Under Roraback's leadership the Republicans retained the governorship from 1915 to 1931. Roraback's fiscally conservative policies led to Connecticut paying down its state debt. Roraback was elected to the Republican National Committee in 1920, a position he also held until his death. In 1924 he served as the speaker of the Republican national convention and became a member of the executive committee. In 1932 he became one of the vice-chairmen. By that time Roraback was regarded as one of the "Old Guard" of the party, opposed to reform and strongly opposed to Roosevelt's New Deal.

== Business career ==
Starting in 1901 Roraback represented the New York, New Haven and Hartford Railroad and was successful in protecting its interests. By 1905 Roraback had taken over and consolidated several small power companies serving Canaan and nearby areas into the Berkshire Power Company with himself as president. He obtained in 1905 a charter for the Rocky River Power Company to develop hydro power on the Housatonic River, rights which finally led to the organization of the Connecticut Light and Power Company in 1917 (with Roraback as president) and the construction of Candlewood Lake to store water and produce hydroelectric power in 1926–8. Roraback also served as president of a number of related power and utility concerns, and as a director of many Connecticut businesses.

Around 1910 Roraback organized the New England Lime Company, a combination of a number of area lime kilns.

== Family and death ==
Roraback married Mary L. Parsons on April 29, 1896. The couple had twins in 1899, but one child died an infant; his son Lewis survived and on his death in the early 1980s donated 1,976 acres of land in Harwinton to the state of Connecticut, now the Roraback Wildlife Management Area.

Roraback also had an illegitimate son, John Anthony Craig, by his long-time personal assistant Mary Collins.

The Depression caused the Republicans to lose power in Connecticut, and Roraback's control of the party came under increased scrutiny and criticism. A throat infection in 1936 left Roraback in poor health, and he committed suicide on May 19, 1937, shooting himself in the head after a morning hunt with his son. His obituary in Time magazine said,

What Ohio's Marcus Alonzo ("Mark") Hanna did with the Republican Party nationally during the single Presidential generation of William McKinley, whipping Big Business to the Party treasury with fear of Bryan's silver money, cajoling it with protective tariffs and other favors, Boss Roraback did with controlled budgets, legislation favorable to industry, in Connecticut during eight gubernatorial terms. But public resentment against his dominance never rose very high because, though a monopolist, he was honest and not rapacious. His Yankee instinct was for payasyougo government and that is the kind New Englanders like.
