= John Kellogg =

John Kellogg may refer to:

- John Kellogg (actor) (1916–2000), American actor in film, stage and television
- John Kellogg (Ohio politician), former member of the Ohio House of Representatives
- John Azor Kellogg (1828–1883), American military leader and politician from Wisconsin
- John Harvey Kellogg (1852–1943), American physician who ran a sanitarium using holistic methods in Battle Creek, Michigan
- J. A. Kellogg (1871–1962), Washington politician
- John P. Kellogg (1860–1925), American judge
