= George W. Wheeler =

American judge (1860–1932)

George Wakeman Wheeler (born Woodville, Mississippi, December 1,1860; died Bridgeport, Connecticut, July 27, 1932) was an American lawyer, judge, and chief justice of the Supreme Court of Connecticut.

Wheeler was the son of George Wakeman Wheeler Sr. (1831-1917) and Lucie (Dowie) Wheeler (1842-1913). His father, from an old Connecticut family, graduated from Amherst College in 1859. He was serving as a superintendent of schools in Mississippi at the time of his son's birth, but later settled in Hackensack, New Jersey where he became a successful insurance broker, served as chairman of the Hackensack Board of Education, and was a common pleas judge, among other civic positions. Wheeler Jr. was educated at the Williston Seminary in Easthampton, Massachusetts, and at Yale (class of 1881) and Yale Law School (class of 1883). He formed a partnership with his college roommate Howard J. Curtis which lasted until Wheeler was appointed to the Superior Court in 1893. He became a member of the Supreme Court in September 1910 and Chief Justice in August 1920, serving until his forced retirement upon turning 70 years of age in 1930.

Wheeler married Agnes Leonard Macy on August 24, 1919; two of his children were alive at the time of his death.
