= John P. Kellogg =

American judge (1860–1925)

John P. Kellogg (March 31, 1860 – January 16, 1925) was a justice of the Connecticut Supreme Court from 1924 until his death in 1925.

== Career ==
Born in Waterbury, Connecticut, Kellogg's father was Congressman Stephen Wright Kellogg. Kellogg graduated from Yale College in 1882, and Yale Law School in 1884, entering into practice with his father.

In 1917 he was appointed by Governor Marcus H. Holcomb to the Superior court bench, where he remained until 1924, when he was appointed to the state supreme court by Governor Charles A. Templeton, to fill a recess appointment. In January 1924, he was reappointed on by Governor John H. Trumbull, but died within days thereafter.

== Personal life and death ==
In 1892, Kellogg married Clara Mason of Bridgeport, with whom he had three children. He died at his home at the age of 64, following an attack of acute indigestion.

Political offices
Preceded by Lucien F. Burpee	Justice of the Connecticut Supreme Court; 1924–1925	Succeeded by William M. Maltbie
