= Henry T. Kellogg =

American judge

Justice of the New York Supreme Court (4th District)
- In office June 16, 1903 – May 16, 1934
- Appointed by: Governor Odell

Personal details
- Born: August 29, 1869 Champlain, Clinton County, New York
- Died: September 6, 1942 (aged 73) Valcour Island, Clinton County, New York
- Resting place: Riverside Cemetery, Plattsburgh
- Parent: Sylvester Alonzo Kellogg (father)
- Education: Harvard University

Henry Theodore Kellogg (August 29, 1869 – September 6, 1942) was an American lawyer and politician from New York.

== Life ==
He was the son of Sylvester Alonzo Kellogg (1838–1904, justice of the New York Supreme Court) and Susan Elizabeth (Averill) Kellogg. Henry Kellogg received his preliminary education at Vermont Episcopal Institute and Rock Point Military Academy, both in Burlington, Vermont. He then attended Harvard University, graduating cum laude in 1889 with a Bachelor of Arts. He received a Bachelor of Laws from Harvard Law School three years later in 1892. Following graduation he moved to Plattsburgh, New York and joined his father's law office, the firm of Kellogg, Weed and Palmer. On March 5, 1903, he married Katharine Miller Weed.

On June 16, 1903, he was appointed by Governor Odell a justice of the New York Supreme Court (4th District) to fill the vacancy caused by the resignation of his father, and was elected as a Republican to a full term in November of the same year. From 1918 on, he sat on the Appellate Division, Third Dept.

In 1926, he was elected on the Republican and Democratic tickets to the New York Court of Appeals. He resigned on May 16, 1934 due to ill health.

He was buried at the Riverside Cemetery in Plattsburgh.

== Sources ==
- NY Court of Appeals biography
- JUSTICE SUCCEEDED BY SON in NYT on June 17, 1903
- DEATH LIST OF A DAY.; Ex-Justice Kellogg in NYT on March 13, 1904
- EX-JUDGE KELLOGG DIES UP-STATE, 73 in NYT on September 7, 1942 (subscription required)
- Political Graveyard
