= North Andover, Massachusetts =

- Town
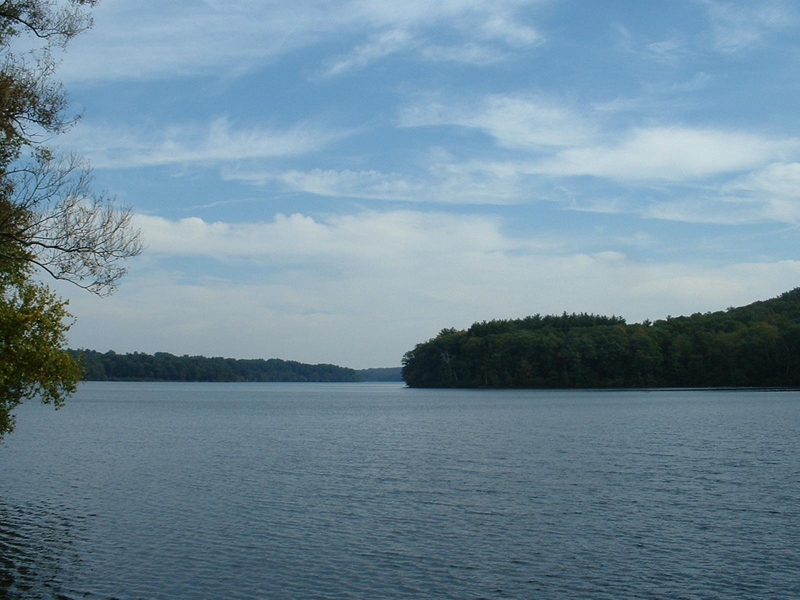
- Lake Cochichewick from the north

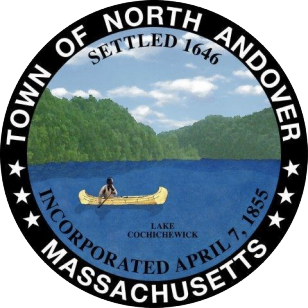
- Seal
- Motto: A Town for All Seasons
- Location in Essex County and the state of Massachusetts.
- Coordinates: 42°41′55″N 71°08′08″W
- Country: United States
- State: Massachusetts
- County: Essex
- Settled: 1634
- Incorporated: 1646
- Current geography: 1855

Government
  - Type: Open Town Meeting
  - Select Board: Select Board Web Site
  - Town Manager: Town Manager Web Site

Area
  - Total: 27.8 sq mi (71.9 km^{2})
  - Land: 26.3 sq mi (68.1 km^{2})
  - Water: 1.4 sq mi (3.7 km^{2})
- Elevation: 75 ft (23 m)

Population (2020)
  - Total: 30,915
  - Density: 1,180/sq mi (454/km^{2})
- Time zone: UTC−5 (Eastern)
  - Summer (DST): UTC−4 (Eastern)
- ZIP Code: 01845
- Area code: 978
- FIPS code: 25-46365
- GNIS feature ID: 0618306
- Website: North Andover, Massachusetts, Official Web Site

North Andover is a town in Essex County, Massachusetts, United States. At the 2020 census, the population was 30,915.

== History ==
Native Americans inhabited what is now northeastern Massachusetts for thousands of years prior to European colonization of the Americas. At the time of European arrival, Massachusett and Naumkeag people inhabited the area south of the Merrimack River and Pennacooks inhabited the area to the north. The Massachusett referred to the area that would later become North Andover as Cochichawick.

The lands south of the Merrimack River around Lake Cochichewick and the Shawsheen River were set aside by the Massachusetts General Court in 1634 for the purpose of creating an inland plantation. The Cochichewick Plantation, as it was called, was purchased on May 6, 1646, when Reverend John Woodbridge, who had settled the land for the English, paid Massachusett sachem Cutshamekin six pounds and a coat for the lands. The plantation was then incorporated as Andover, most likely in honor of the hometown of many early residents, Andover, Hampshire, England. The town was centered in what is now North Andover, but the spread of settlement south and west of the old town center created much conflict in the early years about the location of the parish church. In 1709, the matter was brought to the General Court, which set aside two parish churches, north and south. The parishes grew apart as the years went on and on April 7, 1855, the North parish separated from the south and was incorporated as North Andover.

There are several first-period (pre-1720) houses still standing in town. The oldest house is the Bridges House, relocated from Marbleridge Road to Court Street in 2001; the original portion of this house dates to about 1690. Other first-period houses include the Stevens House on Great Pond Road; the Faulkner House on Appleton Street; the Abiel Stevens House on Salem Street; the Parson Barnard House, which is a museum; a house on Andover Street near the intersection with Chickering Road; and the Carlton-Frie-Tucker House at 140 Mill Road. No house in North Andover has been scientifically dated by dendrochronology, so dates are based solely on stylistic elements, original deeds, and tradition.

The North Parish Church on the North Andover Green is a historic church building built in 1836. It was the 5th meetinghouse of the Puritan church congregation founded in 1645 in North Andover. In about 1836, the congregation became a Unitarian church and commissioned this Gothic building.

North Andover's development was varied, with much of the land along the Shawsheen and Merrimack being concerned with industry, and the lands southwest being more agricultural. Several mills were located in the town, as well as the Western Electric Company, AT&T's manufacturing division, which supplied telephone machinery for many years before AT&T split it up into the new company, Lucent Technologies. Today, North Andover is considered a bedroom community of the Greater Boston area.

In January 2018, voters turned down a proposal for a cannabis-growing and research facility in the former Lucent Technologies building, along the Merrimack River. The town meeting vote was 1,430 against having recreational marijuana facilities and 1,155 voted in favor. The growing and research facility was expected to bring the town $100 million over a 20-year period.

== Geography ==
According to the United States Census Bureau, the town has a total area of 27.8 square miles (71.9 km^{2}), of which 26.3 square miles (68.1 km^{2}) is land and 1.4 square miles (3.7 km^{2}), or 5.18%, is water. The town lies to the south of the Merrimack River, which makes up part of its northwestern boundary, along with the Shawsheen River. The northeastern quadrant of town is dominated by Lake Cochichewick, which is also bordered by the Osgood Hill Reservation, Weir Hill Reservation, and the Reas Pond Conservation Area. The town is also home to portions of Harold Parker State Forest, Boxford State Forest, and the Charles W. Ward Reservation. There are many brooks, streams, and ponds dotting the town.

North Andover lies in the northwestern portion of Essex County along the Merrimack and Shawsheen Rivers. It is bordered by Andover and North Reading to the southwest, Lawrence and Methuen to the northwest, Haverhill to the northeast, Boxford to the east and Middleton to the southeast. North Andover's Old Center, which is closer to the geographic center of town than its newer town center, is located 3.5 miles (5.6 km) southeast of Lawrence's city center and is 25 miles (40 km) north of Boston and 30 miles (48 km) southeast of Manchester, New Hampshire.

== Demographics ==
Historical population
Year	Pop.	±%
1860	2,343	—
1870	2,549	+8.8%
1880	3,217	+26.2%
1890	3,742	+16.3%
1900	4,243	+13.4%
1910	5,529	+30.3%
1920	6,265	+13.3%
1930	6,961	+11.1%
1940	7,524	+8.1%
1950	8,485	+12.8%
1960	10,908	+28.6%
1970	16,284	+49.3%
1980	20,129	+23.6%
1990	22,792	+13.2%
2000	27,202	+19.3%
2010	28,352	+4.2%
2020	30,915	+9.0%
2024*	32,135	+3.9%
* = population estimate. Source: United States Census records and Population Estimates Program data.

As of the census of 2010, there were 28,352 people, 10,516 households, and 7,324 families residing in the town. The population density was 1,078.0 inhabitants per square mile (416.2/km^{2}). There were 10,964 housing units at an average density of 416.9 per square mile (161.0/km^{2}). The racial makeup of the town was 88.7% White, 1.78% African American, 0.09% Native American, 6.31% Asian, 0.01% Pacific Islander, 1.62% from other races, and 1.50% from two or more races. Hispanic or Latino of any race were 4.93% of the population.

There were 10,516 households, out of which 36.1% had children under the age of 18 living with them, 57.0% were married couples living together, 9.6% had a female householder with no husband present, 3.0% had a male householder with no wife present, and 30.4% were non-families. 25.6% of all households were made up of individuals, and 11.6% had someone living alone who was 65 years of age or older. The average household size was 2.62 and the average family size was 3.19.

In the town, the population was spread out, with 26.2% under the age of 18, 7.6% from 18 to 24, 23.9% from 25 to 44, 28.9% from 45 to 64, and 13.4% who were 65 years of age or older. The median age was 40 years. For every 100 females, there were 91.2 males. For every 100 females age 18 and over, there were 92.8 males.

As of the 2017 American Community Survey, the median income for a household in the town was $105,661, and the median income for a family was $132,674. Males had a median income of $68,411 versus $42,270 for females. The per capita income for the town was $51,658. 5.1% of the population and 2.9% of families were below the poverty line. 5.2% of those under the age of 18 and 4.0% of those 65 and older were living below the poverty line.

== Government and infrastructure ==
North Andover employs the open town meeting form of government, and is led by a five-member Select Board and a town manager, Melissa Rodrigues. The town has its own police and fire departments, EMS, public works, and a senior center. North Andover has no hospital, the nearest being Lawrence General Hospital.

On the state level, the town is served by Essex County services and is patrolled by the First Barracks of Troop A of the Massachusetts State Police, based in Andover. North Andover lies in two districts, the Fourteenth Essex and Eighteenth Essex, in the Massachusetts House of Representatives, and the First Essex and First Essex and Middlesex in the Massachusetts Senate. North Andover is located within Massachusetts's 6th congressional district, and has been served by Representative Seth Moulton (D) since 2015. Massachusetts' senior Senator is Elizabeth Warren (D), and its junior Senator is Ed Markey (D), both in office since 2013. North Andover has no mayor, but, until his death in 2006, William P McEvoy, the director of recreation, was known as the "unofficial mayor".

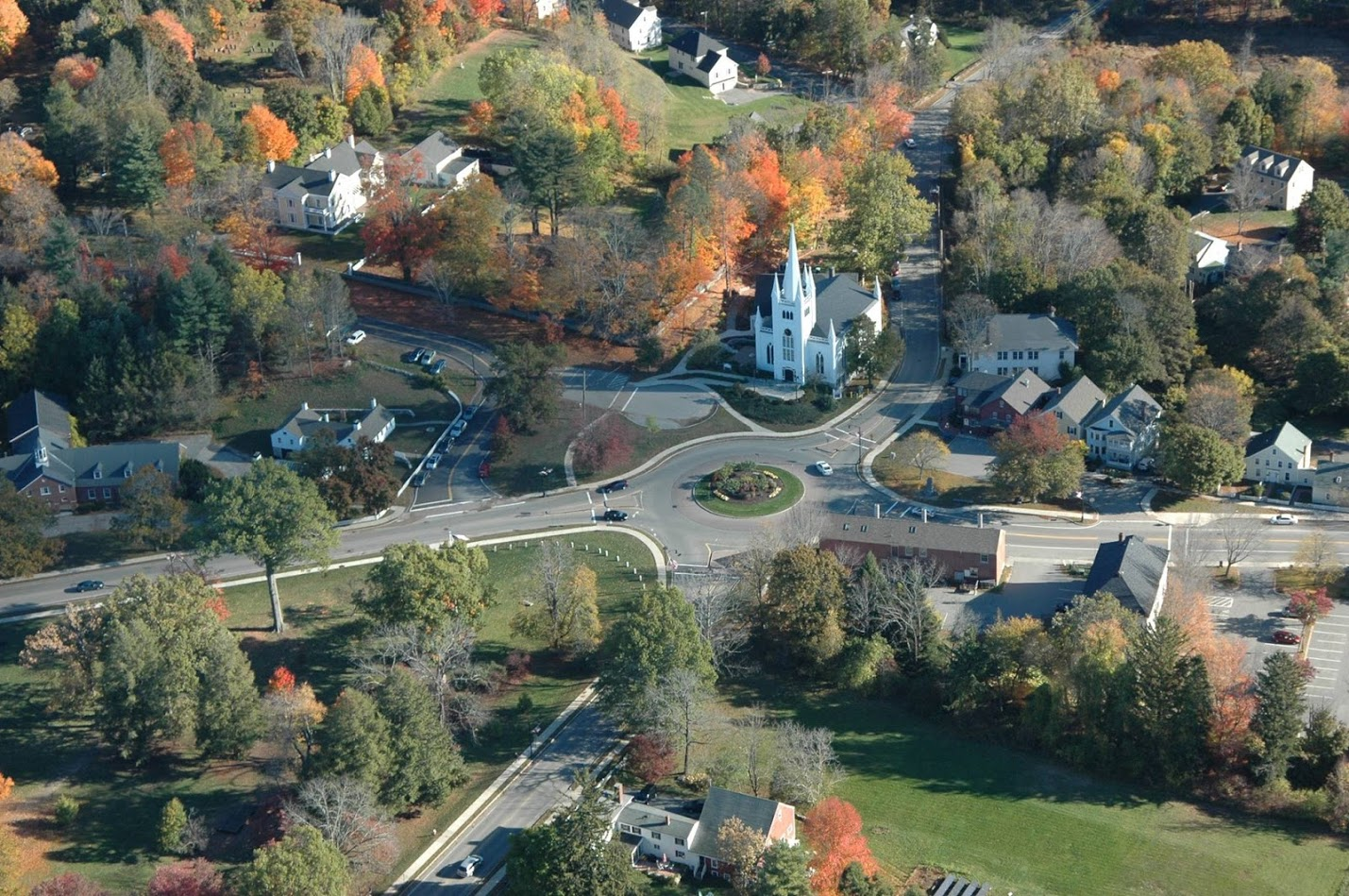
An aerial view of the North Andover Old Center showing the North Parish of North Andover Unitarian Universalist Church.

Interstate 495 crosses through the western part of town along the Lawrence border, with one exit within the town and two more providing access to the town from Lawrence. The town lies along Massachusetts Route 114, known as the "Salem Turnpike," and is also served by Route 125 and Route 133, which are concurrent for much of their routes within town. The Merrimack Valley Regional Transit Authority bus line partially serves the town. The nearest train station is located in neighboring Lawrence, where a stop along the Haverhill/Reading Line of the MBTA Commuter Rail lies, providing service to Boston's North Station (the line actually passes through the town along the Merrimack, but there is no stop). North Andover is also home to the Lawrence Municipal Airport, providing small aircraft service to the region. The nearest airports with national service, Logan International Airport and Manchester-Boston Regional Airport, are within a thirty-mile drive of the town.

== Media ==
North Andover is located within the Boston media market and is served by the Eagle-Tribune newspaper.

== Education ==
North Andover is home to its own school system. It has an early childhood center, five elementary schools (Atkinson Elementary, Franklin Elementary, Kittredge Elementary, Annie L. Sargent Elementary, Thomson Elementary), North Andover Middle School, and North Andover High School. On May 16, 2017, the citizens of North Andover approved the expansion of the early childhood center, which opened for the 2018–2019 school year. The primary reason behind this expansion was to reduce elementary class size, which it failed to realize.

In 2004, a new high school and complete sporting complex were added, including a football field, a soccer field, field hockey greens, and a lacrosse field. There is a complete track and field area and numerous tennis courts. North Andover's mascot is the Scarlet Knight and its colors are scarlet and black. It competes in the Merrimack Valley Conference and Division II of the MIAA. Its main rival is Andover, who it plays in the annual Thanksgiving Day football game. High school students from North Andover are also allowed to attend Greater Lawrence Technical School in Andover. North Andover has two private schools: Brooks School and Saint Michael's Elementary School. The nearest private high schools include Phillips Academy Andover (9–12), Austin Preparatory School (6–12), Central Catholic High School (9–12), which are located in the nearby towns of Andover and Reading, and the city of Lawrence.

North Andover is also home to Merrimack College, a Catholic Augustinian four-year college. The nearest public community college, based in Haverhill, is Northern Essex Community College, which also has a campus in Lawrence and a Corporate & Community Education Center in North Andover. The nearest public university is University of Massachusetts Lowell (UMass Lowell).

== Economy ==
Barker's Farm, which started in 1643, is the oldest continually operated business in Massachusetts and among the oldest in the United States.

Converse, the popular sneaker company, was headquartered in North Andover from 2002 to 2015.

== Amazon ==
On April 8, 2024, Amazon opened an automated warehouse in North Andover, employing over 1,500 people.

== Entertainment ==
Residents of North Andover can purchase a summer pass to Steven's Pond to swim. Nearby Weir Hill offers trails for hiking, walking, biking, and views of the surrounding area and beyond.

Many events are held at the old town center, including the sheep shearing festival in late spring and various summer activities for children and adults. The North Andover Youth Center is also located in the old town center and offers a variety of activities to the town's youth. These services are offered to kids in grades 6 through 12, and yearly passes can be purchased to gain full access to the facilities.

Harold Parker State Forest offers 25 miles (40 km) of trails, a campground, and a freshwater swimming beach. Other activities include horseback riding, camping, fishing, hunting, mountain biking, and hiking. In September there is also an annual fishing tournament.

Boxford State Forest is also located in town and is home to the Sharpner's Pond Anti-Ballistic Missile Site.

The Col. John Osgood House, a historic house, is also in North Andover.

== 2018 gas leaks and explosions ==
On September 13, 2018, several gas lines suffered leakage due to high pressure in the tubes of Columbia Gas of Massachusetts, a subsidiary of NiSource. As a result, several fires and explosions occurred, and homes were evacuated.

== Notable people ==
- Colin Blackwell, ice hockey forward for the Dallas Stars
- Cliff Bleszinski, game designer (Gears of War)
- Anne Bradstreet, poet
- Simon Bradstreet, Anne's husband, minister and co-founder of Massachusetts Bay Colony
- Jake Bobo, NFL wide receiver for the Seattle Seahawks
- Phillips Brooks, minister of Trinity Church, Boston and great-grandson of the founder of Phillips Academy
- Jake Burton Carpenter, founder of Burton Snowboards
- Mike Cavanaugh, head ice hockey coach at University of Connecticut
- Jace Clayton, DJ, writer, interdisciplinary artist
- Joey Daccord, NHL Player
- Eunice Davis, abolitionist and co-founder of the Boston Female Anti-Slavery Society
- Daniel Dennett, philosopher and atheist
- Zak DeOssie, former long snapper for the New York Giants, NFL linebacker
- Bobby Farnham, professional ice hockey player
- Dorothy Farnum, silent film-era screenwriter
- Jamie Hagerman, Olympic ice hockey player
- Steve Heinze, former NHL player
- Charles Jencks, architect and philanthropist
- George B. Loring, member of the US House of Representatives and career politician
- Dave McGillivray, distance runner, author, and road race director
- John U. Monro, dean of Harvard College
- Samuel Osgood, first Postmaster General of the United States
- Samuel Phillips Jr., founder of Phillips Academy
- Richard D. Smith, renowned chemist in the area of proteomics
- James Spader, screen and TV actor (Boston Legal and The Blacklist)
- Issac Stevens, first governor of Washington Territory
- Moses Stevens, textile manufacturer
- Oliver Stevens, Suffolk County district attorney
- Sid Watson, former NFL player, former college ice hockey coach, and US Hockey Hall of Fame inductee
- Zak Zinter, NFL player for the Cleveland Browns

== See also ==
- List of mill towns in Massachusetts
