= Front porch campaign =

Form of home-based political campaigning

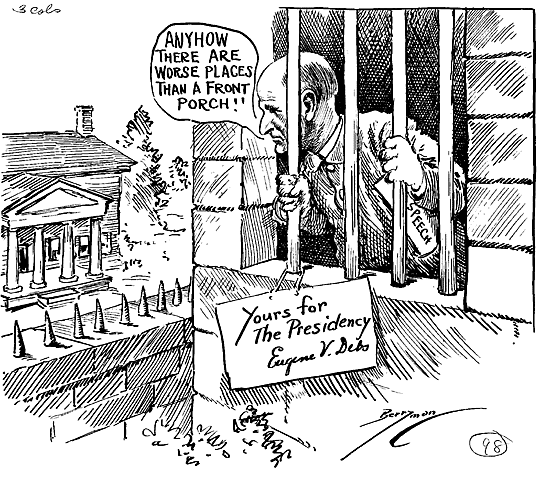
Clifford Berryman's cartoon depiction of Eugene V. Debs' campaign from prison satirizes Warren G. Harding's front porch campaign in the Election of 1920.

A front porch campaign is an electoral campaign used in American politics in which the candidate remains close to or at home where they issue written statements and give speeches to supporters who come to visit. The candidate largely does not travel around or otherwise actively campaign. The presidential campaigns of James A. Garfield in 1880, Benjamin Harrison in 1888, William McKinley in 1896, and Warren G. Harding in 1920 are perhaps the best-known front porch campaigns.

== James A. Garfield ==
James A. Garfield was the Republican nominee for the 1880 presidential election. He ran against the Democrats' nominee Winfield Scott Hancock. Garfield won the close election by less than 10,000 votes. In Mentor, Ohio, Garfield stayed at home honoring campaigning traditions at the time that emulated George Washington's presidency. Garfield gave out short speeches on his front lawn where he spoke about "The future of colored men", "The possibilities of life", " The immortality of ideas", and "German citizens".

== Benjamin Harrison ==
Benjamin Harrison took inspiration from Garfield and ran his own front porch campaign in Indianapolis in 1889. During this time over 350,000 people came to visit his home, many offering gifts. Harrison gave speeches which spoke of highly protected tariffs along with offering support to union soldiers. He gained a huge support from soldiers who sought protection of their homes and family. During this time the infamous Jim Crow Laws were being set in place. To combat, Harrison hosted many African Americans to whom he pledged to protect their rights. Harrison went on to win the presidential election with 233 electoral votes despite Grover Cleveland winning the popular vote with only 168 electoral votes.

== William McKinley ==
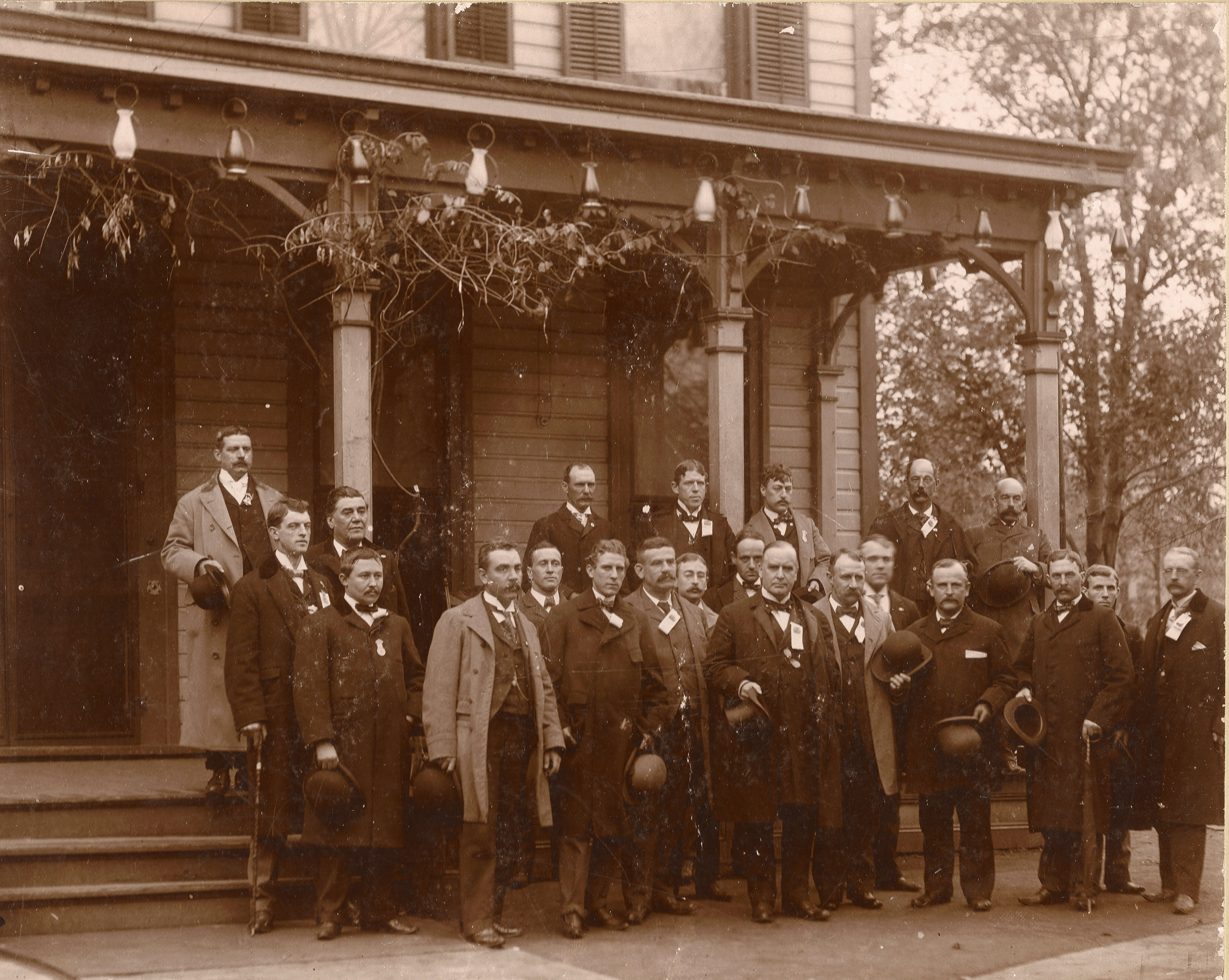
A delegation visiting Republican presidential candidate William McKinley in Canton, Ohio, October 1896

McKinley's opposing candidate, William Jennings Bryan, gave over 600 speeches and traveled many miles all over the United States to campaign, but McKinley outdid this by spending about twice as much money campaigning. While McKinley was at his Canton, Ohio, home conducting his "front porch campaign", Mark Hanna was out raising millions to help with the campaign. Hanna also arranged for various delegations to visit McKinley and hear him deliver a short speech that would then be circulated by the newspapers. These delegations were made up of various interest and demographic groups.

Throughout the course of the 1896 United States presidential election, William McKinley spoke to more than 700,000 supporters in front of his house in Canton. These speeches started as organized meetings between McKinley and delegations from all over the nation. Although it was expensive for the campaign to bring these delegations, all in all, this idea became a good strategy because of the publicity it generated. In addition, due to the fact that McKinley's campaign chose those who would travel as part of the delegation, it was possible to make those who spoke portray McKinley positively.

=== Whistle Stop Train Tour ===
McKinley's front porch campaign was a big contrast to William Jennings Bryan's unprecedented whistle-stop train tour throughout the United States. A 2022 study used these different campaigning strategies to assess the impact of campaign visits. The study found that "campaign visits by Bryan increased his vote share by about one percentage point on average."

== Warren G. Harding ==
Another president known for his front porch campaign was Warren G. Harding during the presidential election of 1920. Harding was a Republican who opposed the sitting president Woodrow Wilson's handling of World War I and the decisions of the League of Nations. He supported new immigration and trades laws using this to push his idea of a promise of return to normal times. Socially, he fought to end lynching and offered support for women’s suffrage. He ran against liberal Democrat James M. Cox. Cox supported Wilson and planned to continue his progressive idealistic narrative in his term. At his home in Marion, Ohio, Harding used a front porch campaign strategy, speaking with cliché phrases to display his narrative of returning the country to normal. This led to Harding winning the presidential election by a landslide, collecting 404 electoral votes to Cox's 127.
