= Charles William Wendte =

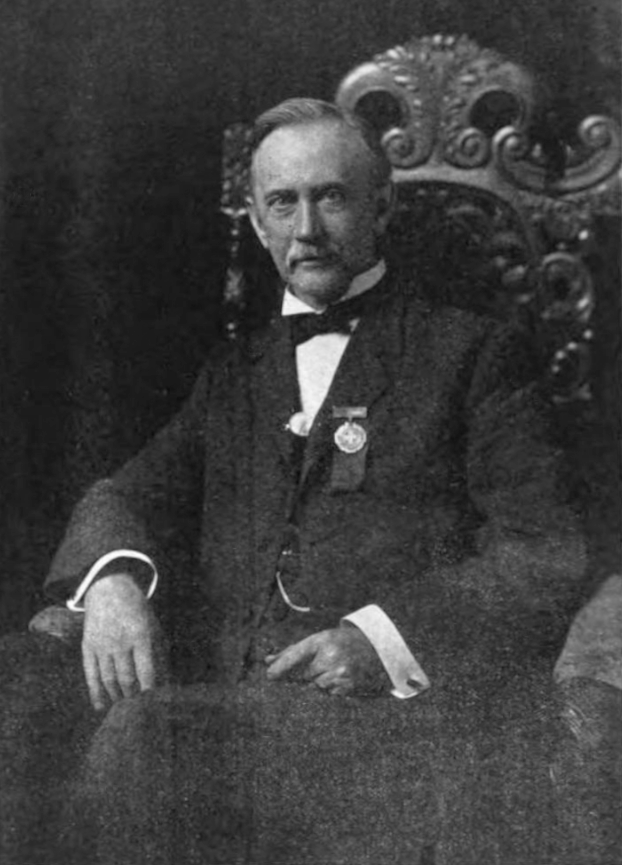
- Born: June 11, 1844; Boston, Massachusetts, US
- Died: September 9, 1931 (aged 87); Oakland, California, US
- Burial place: Mountain View Cemetery
- Education: Meadville Theological School; Harvard Divinity School
- Occupation(s): Clergyman, writer
- Spouse: Abbie Louise Grant (m. 1896)

Charles William Wendte (June 11, 1844 – September 9, 1931) was a Unitarian minister, a writer, an author and editor of religious hymns, an advocate for woman suffrage, and a national spokesman for religious liberalism.

== Biography ==
Born in Boston, Massachusetts, son of Charles and Johanna (Ebeling) Wendte, he graduated from Meadville Theological School in 1867 and Harvard Divinity School in 1869. He was ordained as a Unitarian minister and served churches in Chicago; Cincinnati, Ohio; Newport, Rhode Island; Oakland, California; and Los Angeles. In the early 20th century, he returned to Massachusetts and worked in several churches in metropolitan Boston. He retired to Berkeley, California by 1926.

On June 22, 1880, he offered the opening invocation at the 1880 Democratic National Convention, calling the United States "an asylum and a refuge for the distressed and downtrodden throughout the world," and praying that "all sectional divisions and differences may cease forever among us."

Starting in 1886, he led the First Unitarian Church of Oakland through its early growth and the construction of its still-iconic building. His next pulpit was the First Unitarian Church of Los Angeles in 1897.

In 1896, he strongly endorsed woman suffrage, writing:

The same enlightened confidence in human nature which led the fathers to found the Republic on manhood suffrage, and its saviors to confer the ballot on millions of emancipated slaves, should animate us, their successors, in bestowing equal political rights on that half of our population which is confessedly the most virtuous, order-loving and trustworthy. Until this is done there can be no true democracy among us, and our Republic is such only in name.

He served as secretary of the National Federation of Religious Liberals, 1908–20; secretary for Foreign Affairs of the American Unitarian Association, 1905–15; president of the Free Religious Association, 1910–14, and as president of the Unitarian Ministerial Union.

== Personal life ==
In 1896, he married Abbie Louise Grant (1857-1936).

He died in Oakland on September 9, 1931, and was buried in Mountain View Cemetery.

== Writing ==
=== Books ===
- C Thomas Starr King, Patriot and Preacher (1921)
- The Wider Fellowship (1927).
- The Transfiguration of Life (1930)

=== Song collections ===
- The Carol, for Sunday School and Home (1886)
- Jubilate Deo, a book of songs for use by children and young people (1900)
- Heart and Voice, a Collection of Songs and Services for the Sunday-School and Home (1908)
