= 1880 Democratic National Convention =

U.S. political convention

- 1880 presidential election
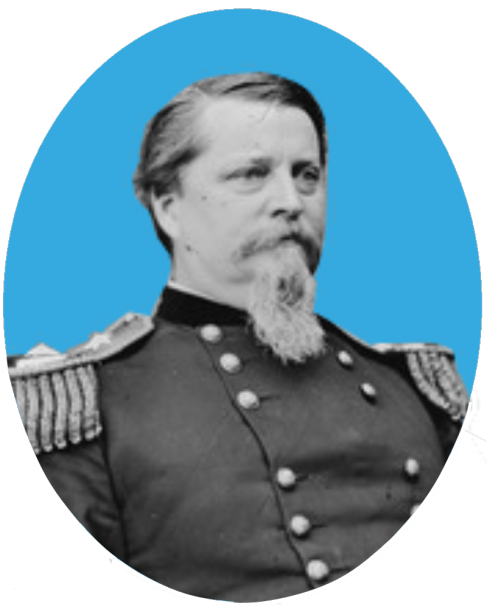
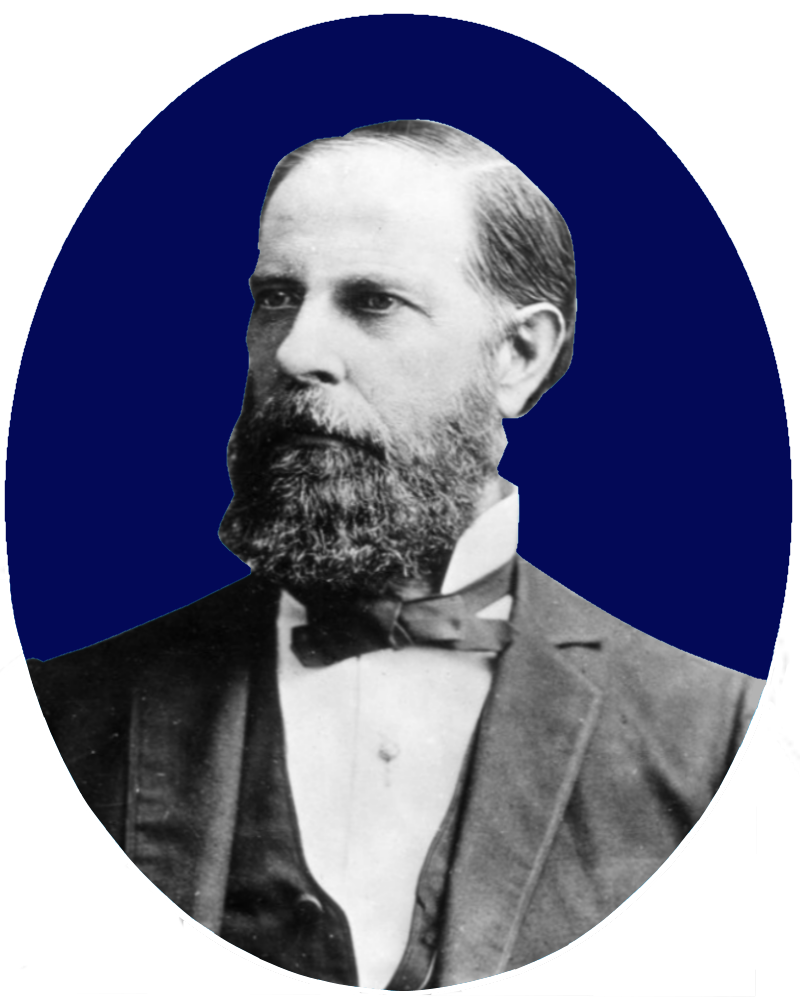
- Nominees; Hancock and English

Convention
- Date(s): June 22–24, 1880
- City: Cincinnati, Ohio
- Venue: Music Hall

Candidates
- Presidential nominee: Winfield Hancock of Pennsylvania
- Vice-presidential nominee: William English of Indiana

The 1880 Democratic National Convention was held June 22 to 24, 1880, at the Music Hall in Cincinnati, Ohio, and nominated Winfield S. Hancock of Pennsylvania for president and William H. English of Indiana for vice president in the United States presidential election of 1880.

Six men were officially candidates for nomination at the convention, and several more also received votes. Of these, the two leading candidates were Hancock and Thomas F. Bayard of Delaware. Not officially a candidate, but wielding a heavy influence over the convention, was the Democratic nominee from 1876, Samuel J. Tilden of New York. Many Democrats believed Tilden to have been unjustly deprived of the presidency in 1876 and hoped to rally around him in the 1880 campaign. Tilden, however, was ambiguous about his willingness to participate in another campaign, leading some delegates to defect to other candidates, while others stayed loyal to their old standard-bearer.

As the convention opened, some delegates favored Bayard, a conservative Senator, and some others supported Hancock, a career soldier and Civil War hero. Still others flocked to men they saw as surrogates for Tilden, including Henry B. Payne of Ohio, an attorney and former representative, and Samuel J. Randall of Pennsylvania, the Speaker of the United States House of Representatives. The first round of balloting was inconclusive. Before the second round, Tilden's withdrawal from the campaign became known for certain and delegates flocked to Hancock, who was nominated. English, a conservative politician from a swing state, was nominated for vice president. Hancock and English were narrowly defeated in the race against Republicans James A. Garfield and Chester A. Arthur that autumn.

== Issues and candidates ==
In 1876, Republican Rutherford B. Hayes of Ohio defeated Democrat Samuel J. Tilden of New York in the most hotly contested election to that time in the nation's history. The results initially indicated a Democratic victory, but the electoral votes of several states were ardently disputed until mere days before the new president was to be inaugurated. Members of both parties in Congress agreed to convene a bi-partisan Electoral Commission, which ultimately decided the race for Hayes. Most Democrats believed Tilden had been robbed of the presidency, and he became the leading candidate for nomination in 1880. In the meantime, issues of tariff reform and the gold standard divided the country and the major parties.

The monetary issue played a large role in selecting the nominees in 1880, but had little effect on the general election campaign. The debate concerned the basis for the United States dollar's value. Nothing but gold and silver coin had ever been legal tender in the United States until the Civil War, when the mounting costs of the war forced Congress to issue "greenbacks" (dollar bills backed by government bonds). They paid for the war, but resulted in the most severe inflation seen since the American Revolution. After the war, bondholders and other creditors (especially in the North) wanted to return to a gold standard. At the same time, debtors (often in the South and West) benefited by the way inflation reduced their debts, and workers and some businessmen liked the way inflation made for easy credit. The issue cut across parties, producing dissension among Republicans and Democrats alike and spawning a third party, the Greenback Party, in 1876, when both major parties nominated hard money men. Monetary debate intensified as Congress effectively demonetized silver in 1873 and began redeeming greenbacks in gold by 1879, while limiting their circulation. By the 1880 convention, the nation's money was backed by gold alone, but the issue was far from settled.

Debate over tariffs would come to play a much larger role in the campaign. During the Civil War, Congress raised protective tariffs to new heights. This was done partly to pay for the war, but partly because high tariffs were popular in the North. A high tariff meant that foreign goods were more expensive, which made it easier for American businesses to sell goods domestically. Republicans supported high tariffs as a way to protect American jobs and increase prosperity. Democrats, generally, saw them as making goods unnecessarily expensive and adding to the growing federal revenues when, with the end of the Civil War, that much revenue was no longer needed. Many Northern Democrats supported high tariffs, however, for the same economic reasons that their Republican neighbors did, so while Democratic platforms called for a tariff "for revenue only," their speakers avoided the question as much as possible.

=== Tilden ===
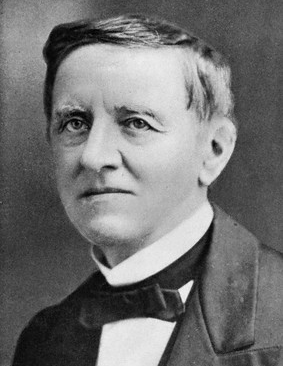
Former Governor Samuel J. Tilden of New York

Samuel Jones Tilden began his political career in the "Barnburner," or Free Soil, faction of the New York Democratic Party. He was a successful lawyer and had accumulated a considerable fortune. A disciple of former president Martin Van Buren, Tilden was first elected to the New York State Assembly in 1846. Tilden defected with Van Buren to the 1848 Free Soil Party convention before returning to the Democratic party after the election. Unlike many free-soil Democrats, Tilden stayed with his party in the 1850s instead of transferring his allegiance to the newly formed Republican party. When the Civil War began, he remained loyal to the Union and considered himself a War Democrat. In 1866, he became chairman of the New York State Democratic party, a post he held for eight years. Tilden initially cooperated with Tammany Hall, the New York City political machine of William "Boss" Tweed, but the two men soon became enemies. In the early 1870s, as reports of Tammany's corruption spread, Tilden took up the cause of reform. He formed a rival faction that captured control of the party and led the effort to uncover proof of Tammany's corruption and remove its men from office. Tweed was soon indicted and convicted; Tammany was weakened and reformed, but not vanquished.

The triumph over Tammany paved the way for Tilden's election to a two-year term as governor in 1874. As a popular, reformist governor of a large swing state, Tilden was a natural candidate for the presidency in 1876, when one of the main issues was the corruption of the administration of President Ulysses S. Grant. He was nominated on the second ballot, and campaigned on a platform of reform and sound money (i.e. the gold standard). His opponent was Governor Rutherford B. Hayes of Ohio, likewise noted for his honesty and hard-money views. After the closely contested election, with the question still unresolved, Congress and President Grant agreed to submit the dispute to a bipartisan Electoral Commission, which would determine the fate of the disputed electoral votes. Tilden opposed the idea, but many Democrats supported it as the only way to avoid a second Civil War. The commission voted 8–7 to award Hayes the disputed votes. Congressional Democrats acquiesced in Hayes's election, but at a price: the new Republican president withdrew federal troops from Southern capitals after his inauguration. Tilden was defeated—robbed, in his opinion and that of his supporters.

Tilden spent the next four years as the presumptive Democratic candidate in 1880. In 1879, he declined to run for another term as governor and focused instead on building support for the 1880 presidential nomination. He considered many of his former friends (including Senator Thomas F. Bayard of Delaware) enemies now for their support of the Electoral Commission, and sought to keep the "fraud of '76" in the spotlight and burnish his own future candidacy by having his congressional allies investigate the events of the post-election maneuvering. For ten months beginning in May 1878, the Potter Committee, chaired by Democratic Congressman Clarkson Nott Potter of New York, investigated allegations of fraud and corruption in the states which had contested electoral votes in 1876. Rather than produce conclusive evidence of Republican malfeasance, as Tilden's supporters hoped, the committee exonerated Tilden of wrongdoing, but uncovered conflicting evidence that showed state election officials of both parties in an unfavorable light. This, and Tilden's declining health, made many Democrats question his candidacy. Even so, Tilden's presumed ability to carry New York, combined with his political organization and personal fortune, made him a serious contender.

The first of these qualifications was shattered with the Republican victory in the New York gubernatorial election in 1879. In that election, a revitalized Tammany split from the regular Democratic party in a patronage dispute with Tilden's faction (now known as the "Irving Hall Democrats"). Tammany ran its new leader, "Honest" John Kelly, as an independent candidate for governor, allowing the Republicans to carry the state with a plurality of the vote. Tilden began to waver, issuing ambiguous statements about whether he would run again. Rumors circulated wildly in the months before the convention, with no definitive word from Tilden. As the New York delegation left for the national convention in Cincinnati, Tilden gave a letter to one of his chief supporters, Daniel Manning, suggesting that his health might force him to decline the nomination. Tilden hoped to be nominated, but only if he was the unanimous choice of the convention; if not, Manning was entrusted to make the contents of Tilden's letter available to the New York delegation. When it became clear that the nomination would be contested, Manning revealed the contents of the Tilden letter; it was vague and inconclusive, but once its contents became known to Tilden's home state delegates, they chose to interpret it as a withdrawal. The New York delegation now considered Tilden's candidacy to be ended, and sought a new standard-bearer.

=== Bayard ===
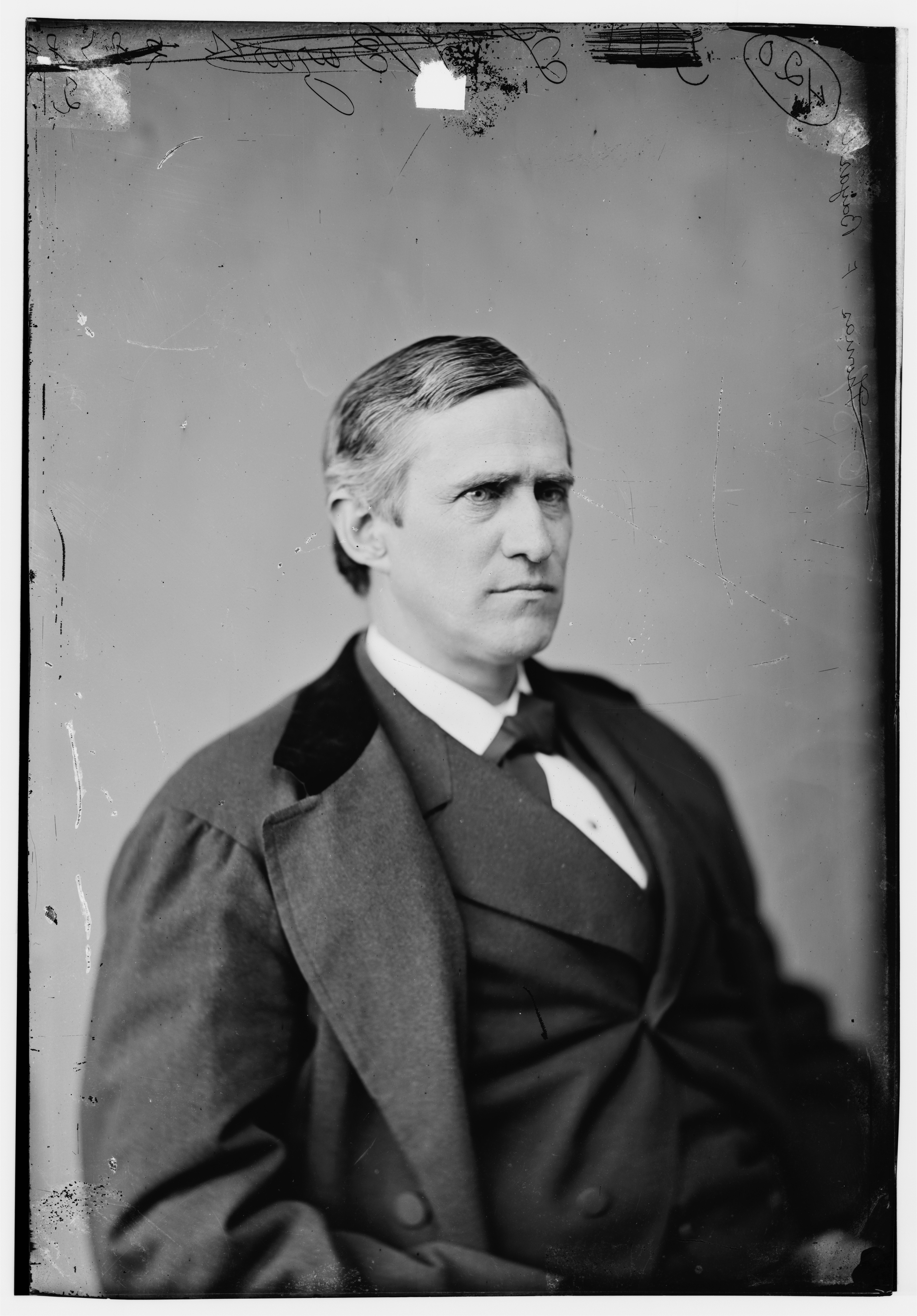
Senator Thomas F. Bayard of Delaware

One beneficiary of Tilden's departure from the scene was Senator Thomas F. Bayard of Delaware. Bayard was the scion of an old political family in Delaware and had represented his state in the United States Senate since 1869. As one of a relative handful of conservative Democrats in the Senate at the time, Bayard began his career opposing vigorously, if ineffectively, the Republican majority's plans for the Reconstruction of the Southern states after the Civil War. Like Tilden, Bayard supported the gold standard and had a reputation for honesty. At the 1876 convention, Bayard had placed a distant fifth in the balloting, but supported Tilden's cause in the general election, speaking on his behalf around the country. The political friendship between the two quickly soured in the election's aftermath as Bayard supported the Electoral Commission and Tilden opposed it. Bayard believed the commission was the only alternative to civil war, and served as one of the Democratic members; Tilden took this as a personal betrayal.

In the four years that followed, Bayard sought to build support for another run at the nomination. He and Tilden competed for support among Eastern conservatives because of their support for the gold standard. The gold standard was less popular in the South, but there Bayard stacked his years-long advocacy in the Senate for pro-Southern conservative policies against Tilden's political machine and wealth in the contest for Southern delegates. A blow to Bayard's cause came in February 1880 when the New York Sun, a newspaper friendly to Tilden, published a transcript of a speech Bayard made in Dover, Delaware, in 1861. As the states of the Deep South were seceding from the Union, a young Bayard had proclaimed "with this secession, or revolution, or rebellion, or by whatever name it may be called, the State of Delaware has naught to do", and urged that the South be permitted to withdraw from the Union in peace. To many in the South, this confirmed their view of Bayard as their champion, but paradoxically it weakened Bayard's support with other Southerners, who feared that a former Peace Democrat would never be acceptable to Northerners. At the same time, Bayard's uncompromising stance on the money question pushed some Democrats to support Major General Winfield Scott Hancock, who had not been identified with either extreme in the gold–silver debate and had a military record that appealed to Northerners. As the convention opened, Bayard was still among the leading candidates, but was far from certain of victory.

=== Hancock ===
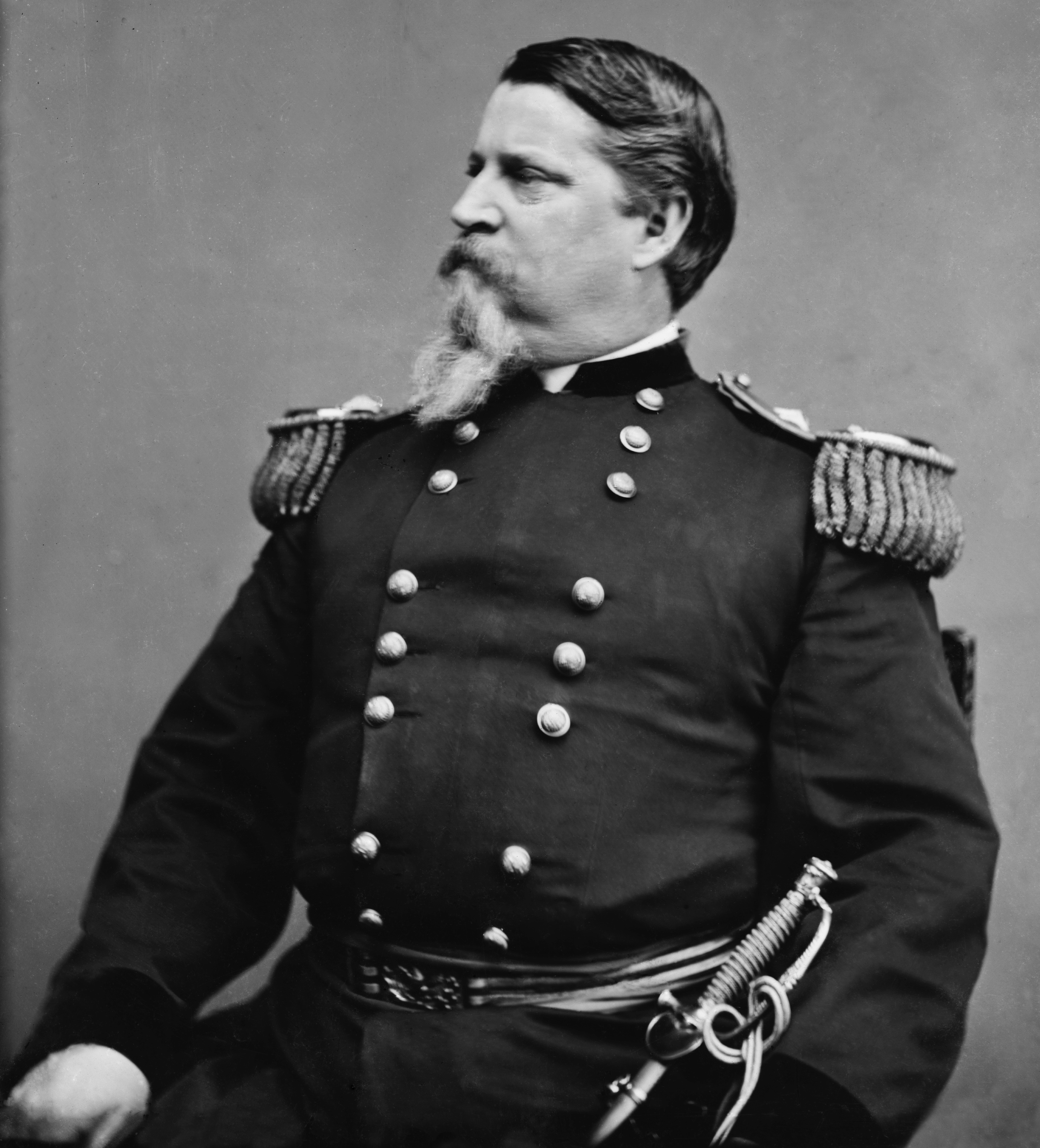
Major General Winfield Scott Hancock of Pennsylvania

Winfield Scott Hancock represented an unusual confluence in the post-war nation: a man who believed in the Democratic Party's principles of states' rights and limited government, but whose anti-secessionist sentiment was unimpeachable. A native of Pennsylvania, Hancock graduated from the United States Military Academy at West Point in 1844 and began a forty-year career as a soldier. He served with distinction in the Mexican–American War and in the antebellum peacetime army. At the outbreak of the Civil War, Hancock remained loyal to the Union. He was promoted to brevet brigadier general in 1861 and placed in command of a brigade in the Army of the Potomac. In the Peninsula Campaign of 1862, he led a critical counterattack and earned the nickname "Hancock the Superb" from his commander, Major General George B. McClellan. At Antietam, he led a division in the Union victory and was promoted to major general. Hancock's shining moment came at the Battle of Gettysburg when he organized the scattered troops, rallied defenses, and was wounded on the third day as his troops turned back Pickett's Charge.

Since 1864, when he received a single unsolicited vote at the Democratic National Convention, Hancock had been a perennial candidate. As military governor of Louisiana and Texas in 1867, Hancock had won the respect of the white conservative population by issuing his General Order Number 40, in which he stated that if the residents of the district conducted themselves peacefully and the civilian officials performed their duties, then "the military power should cease to lead, and the civil administration resume its natural and rightful dominion." He had a larger following at the 1868 convention, finishing as high as second place in some rounds of balloting. In 1876, Hancock again drew a considerable following, but never finished higher than third place at that year's convention. In 1880, another Hancock boom began, this time centered mostly in the South. In March of that year, the New Orleans Picayune ran an editorial that called for the general's nomination, partly for who he was—a war hero with conservative political principles—and partly for who he was not—a known partisan of either side of the monetary or tariff debates. As Tilden and Bayard rose and fell in the estimation of Democratic voters, Hancock's bid for nomination gathered steam. Some were unsure whether, after eight years of Grant, himself a former general, the party would be wise to give the nomination to another "man on horseback", but Hancock remained among the leading contenders as the convention began that June.

=== Other contenders ===
Several other candidates arrived in Cincinnati with delegates pledged to them. Former Representative Henry B. Payne, an Ohio millionaire, had gathered a number of former Tilden supporters to his cause. Payne was a corporate lawyer and hard money advocate, but also a relative unknown outside Ohio. In April 1880, the New York Star published a tale that Tilden had bowed out of the race and instructed the Irving Hall faction to back Payne for the presidency. Tilden never confirmed the rumor, but after his letter of June 1880 to the New York delegation, many of his supporters did consider Payne among their likely choices. Payne, like Bayard, had served on the Electoral Commission of 1876, but had nevertheless maintained Tilden's friendship. He maintained his loyalty to Tilden until the convention, when his withdrawal was certain. Payne was hindered by a fellow Ohioan, Senator Allen G. Thurman, who controlled their home state's delegation. Thurman looked like a natural successor to Tilden, as a popular conservative from a swing state with a background as an attorney, but he, like Bayard, had earned Tilden's enmity by serving on the Electoral Commission. Thurman was also less wedded to the gold standard than some Northeastern delegates would tolerate.

Another would-be heir to Tilden was Samuel J. Randall, since 1863 a congressman from Philadelphia. Like Tilden, Randall was conservative on the money question but, unusually for a Democrat, he supported high tariffs to protect American industry. He also advocated legislation to reduce the power of monopolies. Tilden had supported Randall in his quest to become Speaker of the House, and Randall returned the favor by remaining a loyal Tilden man up to the convention. He now hoped for the support of the former Tilden adherents in his quest for the presidency. Former Governor Thomas A. Hendricks of Indiana, Tilden's 1876 running mate, also sought a claim on the previous nominee's support. He came from a crucial swing state that the Democrats had narrowly carried in 1876 and had some support in the Midwestern states. His popularity with delegates from the Northeast was impaired by his views on the currency question; he sided with those who wanted looser money.

Two candidates stood with rather less support. William Ralls Morrison of Illinois had served in Congress since 1873 and was best known for advocating tariff reductions despite hailing from a protectionist district. He commanded little support outside his home state, and was seen as only a favorite son. Justice Stephen Johnson Field of the United States Supreme Court was better known, but still an unlikely contender. The only candidate from the Far West, Field was respected as a scholar of the law, but had greatly diminished his chances with his home state of California by striking down anti-Chinese legislation in that state in 1879. Even so, some observers, including Edwards Pierrepont, considered Field a likely choice for the nomination.

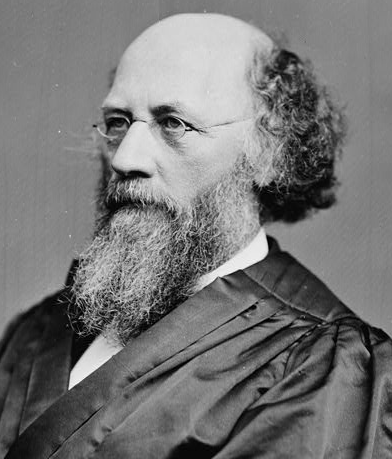
Associate Justice Stephen J. Field of California

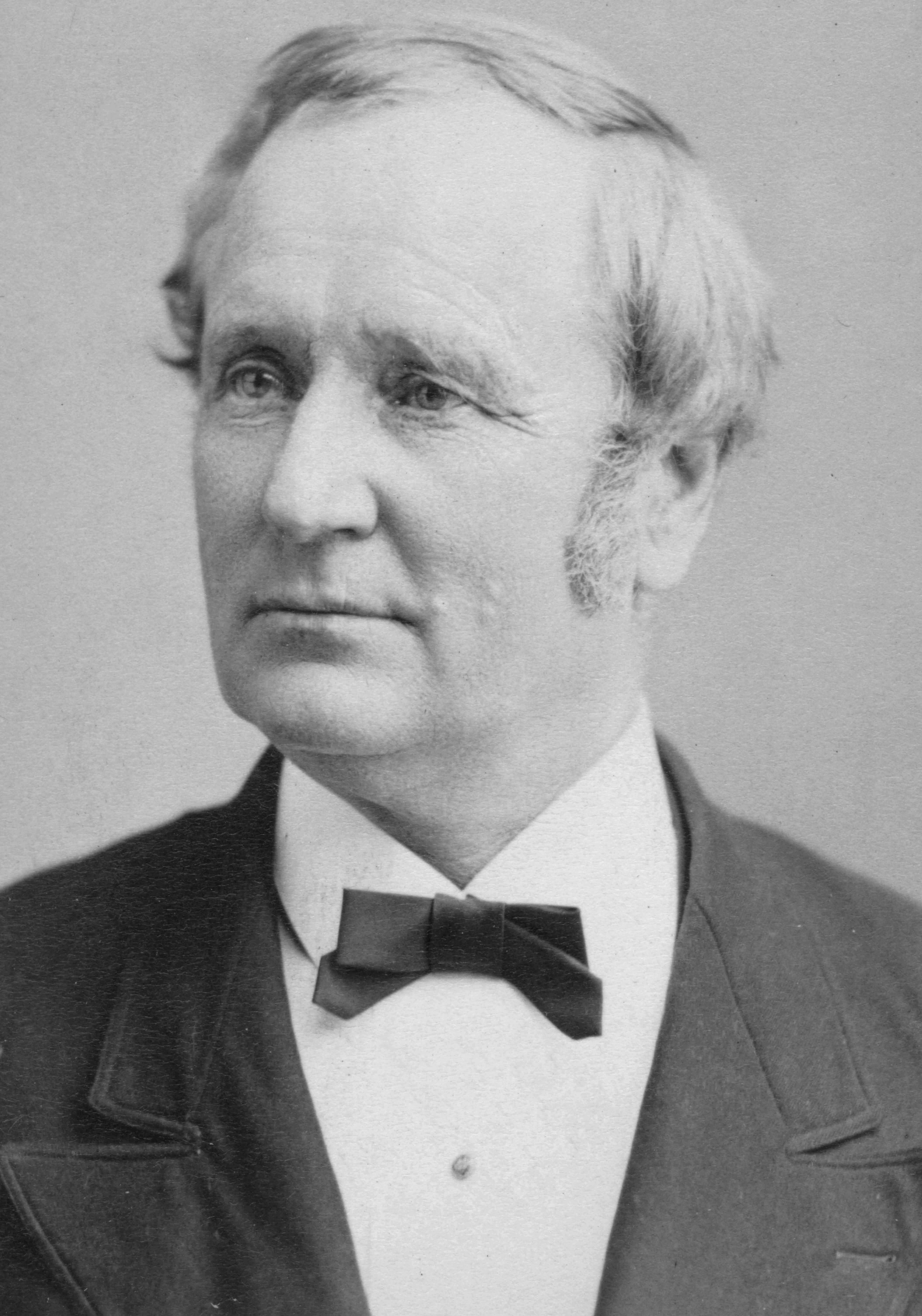
Former Governor Thomas A. Hendricks of Indiana

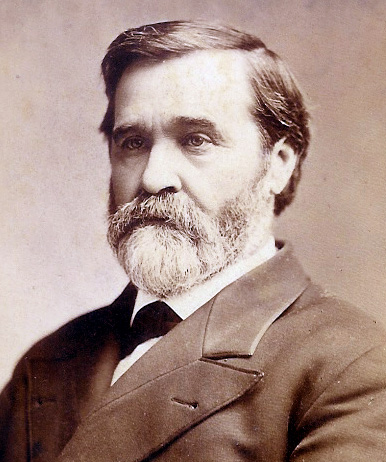
Representative William R. Morrison of Illinois

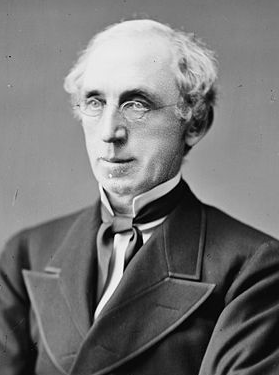
Former Representative Henry B. Payne of Ohio

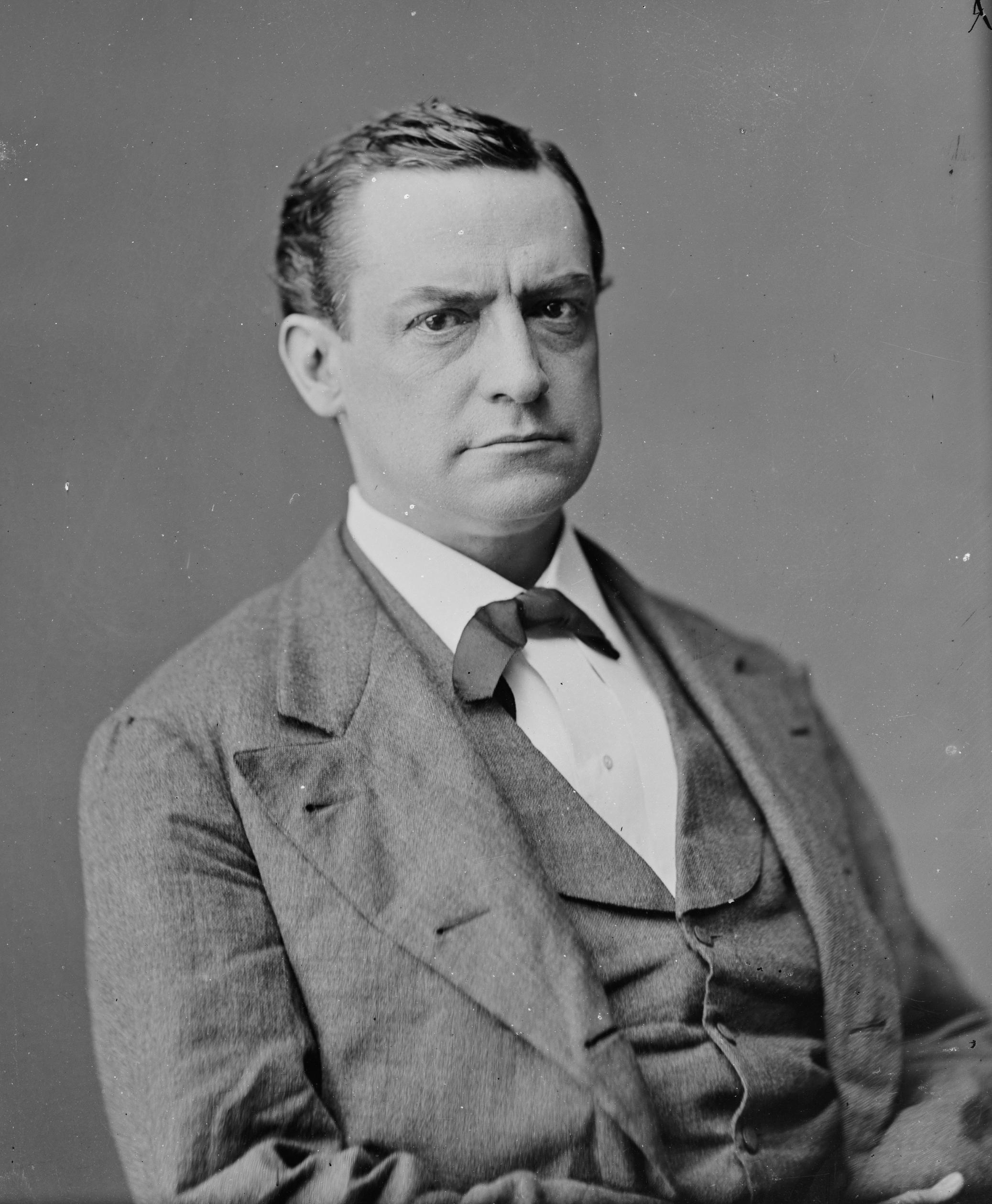
Speaker of the House Samuel J. Randall of Pennsylvania

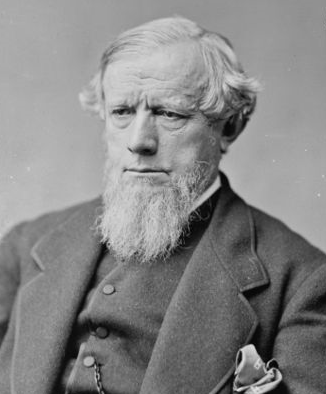
Senator Allen G. Thurman of Ohio

== Convention ==
=== Preliminaries ===
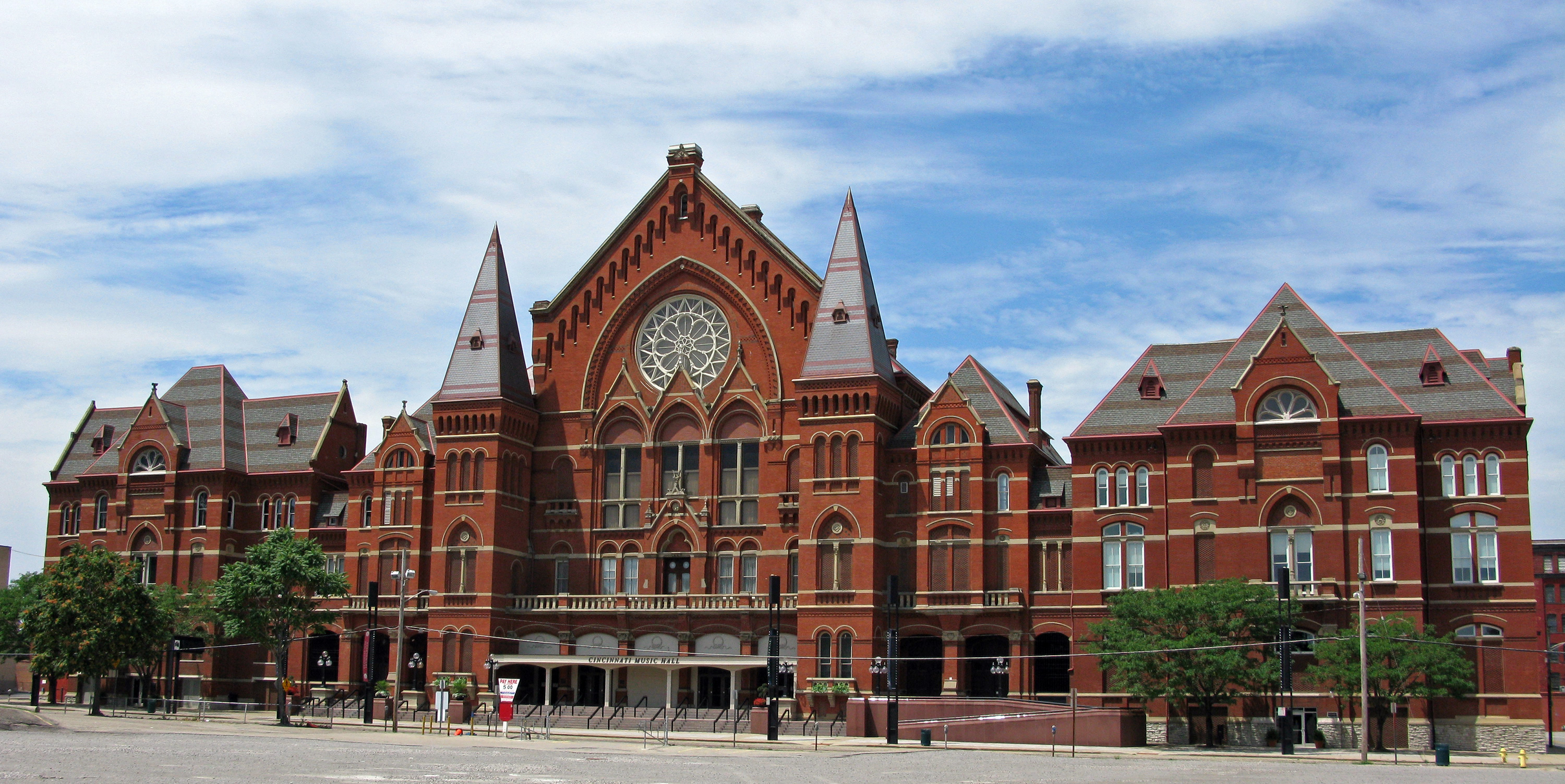
The site of the 1880 Democratic National Convention: Cincinnati's Music Hall

The delegates assembled on June 22, 1880, at Cincinnati's Music Hall. The venue was a large, red brick building in the High Victorian Gothic style, which had opened in 1878. Intended, as the name suggests, for musical performances, the hall also functioned as Cincinnati's convention center until a separate building was constructed in 1967. William Henry Barnum of Connecticut, the chairman of the Democratic National Committee, called the convention to order at 12:38 p.m. An opening prayer was presented by Unitarian minister Charles William Wendte. Then, George Hoadly, a Tilden associate and future governor of Ohio, was elected temporary chairman. Hoadly addressed the crowd, then adjourned the convention until 10:00 a.m. the next day, so that the Committee on Credentials could consider certain disputes among the delegates.

At the start of the second day, June 23, the Committee on Permanent Organization announced the roster of officers, including the permanent president, John W. Stevenson of Kentucky. Before the delegates could formally elect Stevenson, they heard the report on the Committee on Credentials. Two rival factions of Massachusetts Democrats had agreed to compromise, both being admitted as a united delegation. (Note: The two factions were known as the "Faneuil Hall Democrats and the "Mechanics Hall Democrats") A similar dispute in New York was not resolved so easily: Tammany Hall and Tilden's Irving Hall had sent rival delegations as well, and neither was willing to compromise. The committee had voted to consider the Irving Hall Democrats to have been regularly elected; Tammany was consequently excluded. Debate followed, in which some delegates urged compromise, with the idea that a united delegation would help unite the party in New York in the coming general election. The argument was unpersuasive, as the delegates endorsed the committee's decision by a vote of 457 to 205 1/2; Tammany was banished. Stevenson was then installed as permanent chairman and, as the Committee on Resolutions had not finished writing the platform, the delegates moved on to nominations.

=== Nominations ===
The clerk called the roll of states alphabetically. The first delegation to nominate a candidate was California. John Edgar McElrath, an Oakland attorney, rose to nominate Justice Stephen J. Field. Extolling Field's virtues and learning, McElrath promised that, if nominated, "he will sweep California like the winds that blow through her Golden Gate." George Gray, Delaware's Attorney General and a future United States Senator, next nominated Thomas F. Bayard. Gray, in a speech that evinced his admiration for the Senator, said of Bayard:

Thomas Francis Bayard is a statesman who will need no introduction to the American people. His name and record are known wherever our flag floats, aye, wherever the English tongue is spoken. ... With his sympathies as broad as this great continent, a private character as spotless as the snow from heaven, a judgment as clear as the sunlight, an intellect as keen and bright as a flashing sabre, honest in thought and deed, the people all know him by heart.

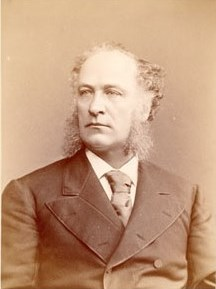
Daniel Dougherty gave a rousing speech to nominate Winfield Scott Hancock.

Illinois was the next state to offer a name, as former Representative Samuel S. Marshall rose to submit that of his erstwhile colleague, William R. Morrison. Marshall immediately antagonized the South by comparing Morrison to Abraham Lincoln, and proclaimed that Morrison's belief in tariff reduction would be a "tower of strength" in the election.

Next, Senator Daniel W. Voorhees of Indiana spoke on behalf of Thomas A. Hendricks, praising Hendricks as a candidate of national unity: "[T]o the South, who has been more faithful? To the North, who has been truer? To the East, who has been better, wiser, more conservative and more faithful? And to the West I need not appeal, for he is our own son." The next few states made no nominations. When the roll reached New York, there were cries from the crowd for Tilden, and some confusion when that state's delegation made no nomination.

The next nomination came from Ohio, as John McSweeney made the case for Senator Allen G. Thurman. "Great in genius, correct in judgment," as McSweeney described him in a lengthy speech, Thurman was "of unrivaled eloquence in defense of the right, with a spotless name, he stands forth as a born leader of the people." Next came the Pennsylvania delegation, from which Daniel Dougherty rose. Dougherty, a Philadelphia lawyer, gave a short and effective speech in favor of Winfield Scott Hancock. (Note: Dougherty was not a delegate, but was admitted as a substitute for a delegate who had yielded his seat so Dougherty could make the nomination.)

I present ... one who, on the field of battle, was styled "the Superb," ... Whose nomination will thrill the land from end to end and crush the last embers of sectional strife, and be hailed as the dawning of the longed-for day of perpetual brotherhood. ... With him as our chieftain, the bloody banner of the Republicans will fall from their palsied grasp. We can appeal to the supreme tribunal of the American people against the corruptions of the republican party and its untold violations of constitutional liberty.

As Dougherty finished his speech, delegates and spectators shouted for Hancock. After five minutes, the cheers subsided. Senator Wade Hampton III of South Carolina, a former Confederate general, next spoke to praise Hancock, saying "we of the South would feel safe in his hands", but said that Bayard was ultimately his choice "because we believe he is the strongest man". Richard B. Hubbard, a former governor of Texas and Confederate soldier, spoke in favor Hancock as his state seconded the Pennsylvanian's nomination. Hubbard praised Hancock's conduct as military governor of Texas and Louisiana, saying, "in our hour of sorrow, when he held his power at the hands of the great dominant Republican party ... there stood a man with the constitution before him, reading it as the fathers read it; that the war having ended we resumed the habiliments that as a right belong to us, not as a conquered province, but as a free people." The last few states were called and the nominations ended. After a motion to adjourn failed, the delegates proceeded directly to the balloting.

=== Balloting ===
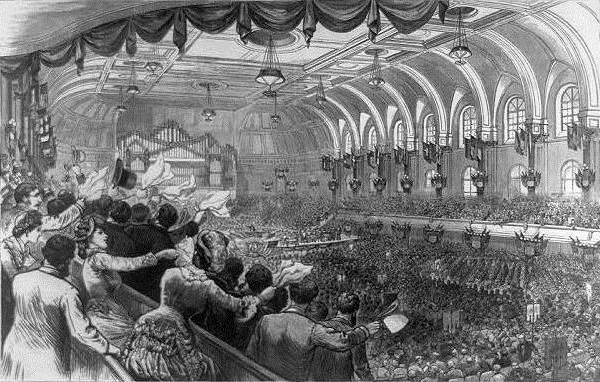
A scene inside the convention

The clerk called the roll of the states again, and a band played "Yankee Doodle" and "Dixie" as the ballots were tallied. The results showed that the delegates had scattered their ballots to a variety of candidates, with no one close to the 492 necessary to nominate (at that time, Democratic conventions required a two-thirds majority for nomination). There was a clear delineation, however, as Hancock and Bayard, with 171 and 153 1/2 respectively, were far ahead of the pack. The next closest, Payne, had less than half of Hancock's number, with 81. After one minor shift of 1/2 ballot, the totals were announced to the delegates. They voted to adjourn for the day, clearing the way for the off-site negotiations that would influence the next day's ballot.

The delegates assembled the next day, June 24, to resume the balloting. Before that could begin, Rufus Wheeler Peckham of the New York delegation produced Tilden's letter and read it to the crowd. The first mention of Tilden's name provoked excitement, but the meaning of the message soon quieted the crowd. Peckham announced that, with Tilden's withdrawal, New York, now supported Samuel J. Randall. Moving then to the second ballot, more than one hundred delegates followed Peckham's lead in voting for Randall, boosting his total to 128 1/2, just above Bayard's 112. But the shift to Hancock had been greater. Before the totals were announced to the crowd, Hancock had gathered 320 delegates to him; as soon as the voting stopped, however, Wisconsin, and New Jersey changed all of their votes to Hancock. Pennsylvania added those of their votes that were not already for Hancock. Then Smith M. Weed of New York, a Tilden confidante, announced that his state, too, would shift all of its 70 votes to Hancock. After that, according to the party records, "every delegate was on his feet and the roar of ten thousand voices completely drowned the full military band in the gallery."

Nearly all of the remaining states now stampeded for Hancock. When the second vote was finally tallied, Hancock had 705. Only Indiana refrained completely from joining in, casting its 30 votes for Hendricks; two Bayard voters from Maryland and one Tilden man from Iowa were the remaining hold-outs. After the second round was tallied, the nomination was made unanimous. Several delegates then spoke to praise Hancock and promise that he would triumph in the coming election. Even Tammany's John Kelly was permitted to speak. Kelly pledged his faction's loyalty to the party, saying, "Let us unite as a band of brothers and look upon each other kindly and favorably."

| Presidential candidate | 1st before shifts | 1st after shifts | 2nd before shifts | 2nd after shifts | Unanimous |
|---|---|---|---|---|---|
| Winfield Scott Hancock | 171 | 171 | 320 | 705 | 738 |
| Thomas F. Bayard | 153.5 | 153.5 | 112 | 2 | |
| Samuel J. Randall* | 6 | 6 | 128.5 | 0 | |
| Henry B. Payne* | 81 | 81 | 0 | 0 | |
| Allen G. Thurman | 68.5 | 68.5 | 50 | 0 | |
| Stephen J. Field | 64.5 | 65 | 65.5 | 0 | |
| William R. Morrison | 62 | 62 | 0 | 0 | |
| Thomas A. Hendricks | 49.5 | 49.5 | 31 | 30 | |
| Samuel J. Tilden* | 38 | 38 | 6 | 1 | |
| James E. English* | 1 | 1 | 19 | 0 | |
| Thomas Ewing* | 10 | 10 | 0 | 0 | |
| Horatio Seymour* | 8 | 8 | 0 | 0 | |
| William A. H. Loveland* | 5 | 5 | 0 | 0 | |
| Joseph E. McDonald* | 3 | 3 | 0 | 0 | |
| George B. McClellan* | 2 | 2 | 0 | 0 | |
| Joel Parker* | 1 | 1 | 2 | 0 | |
| Jeremiah S. Black* | 1 | 1 | 0 | 0 | |
| Hugh J. Jewett* | 1 | 1 | 1 | 0 | |
| George V. N. Lothrop* | 1 | 1 | 0 | 0 | |
| Blank | 11 | 10.5 | 3 | 0 | |

* The candidate was not formally nominated.

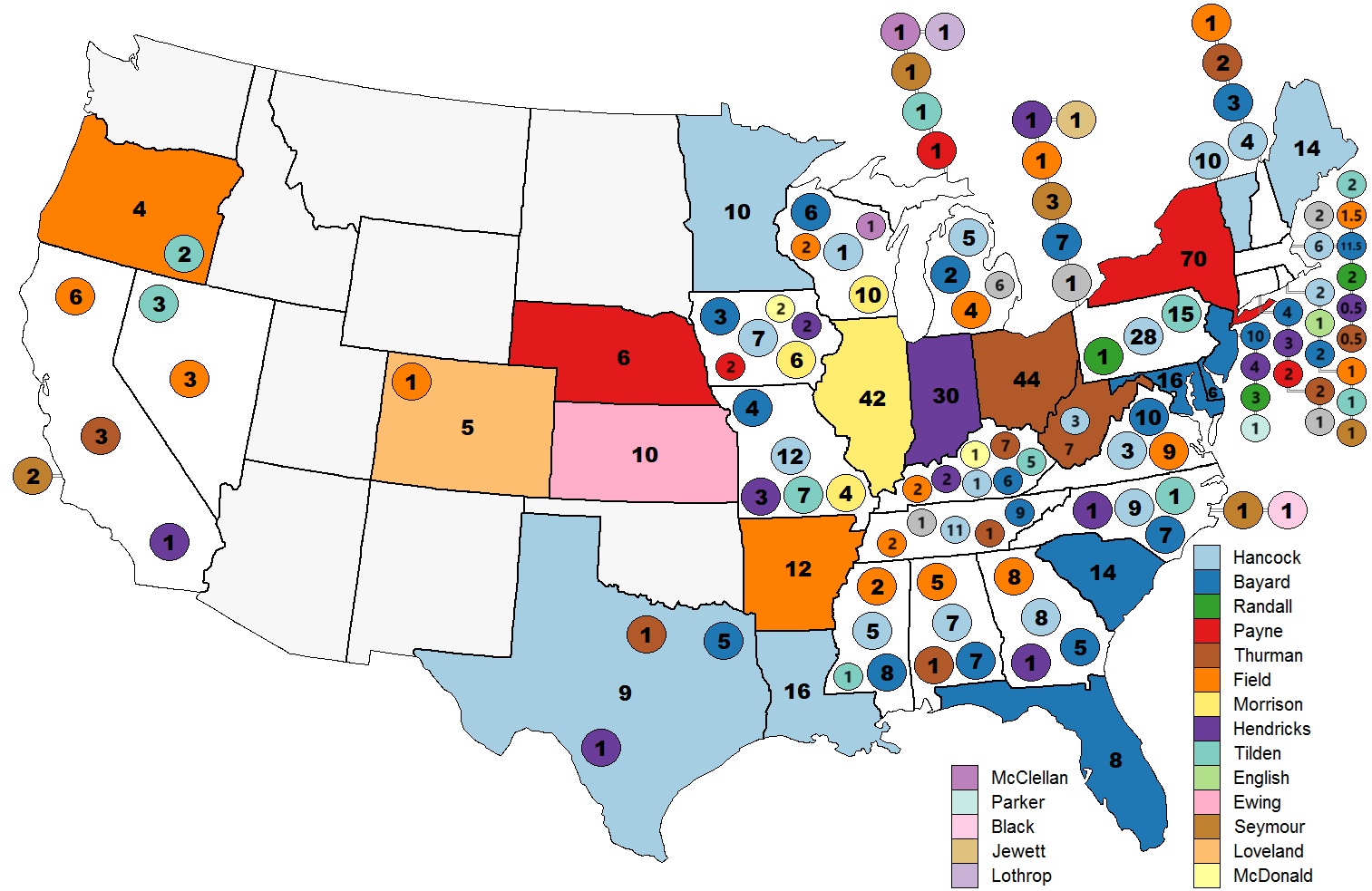
1st Presidential Ballot
Before Shifts

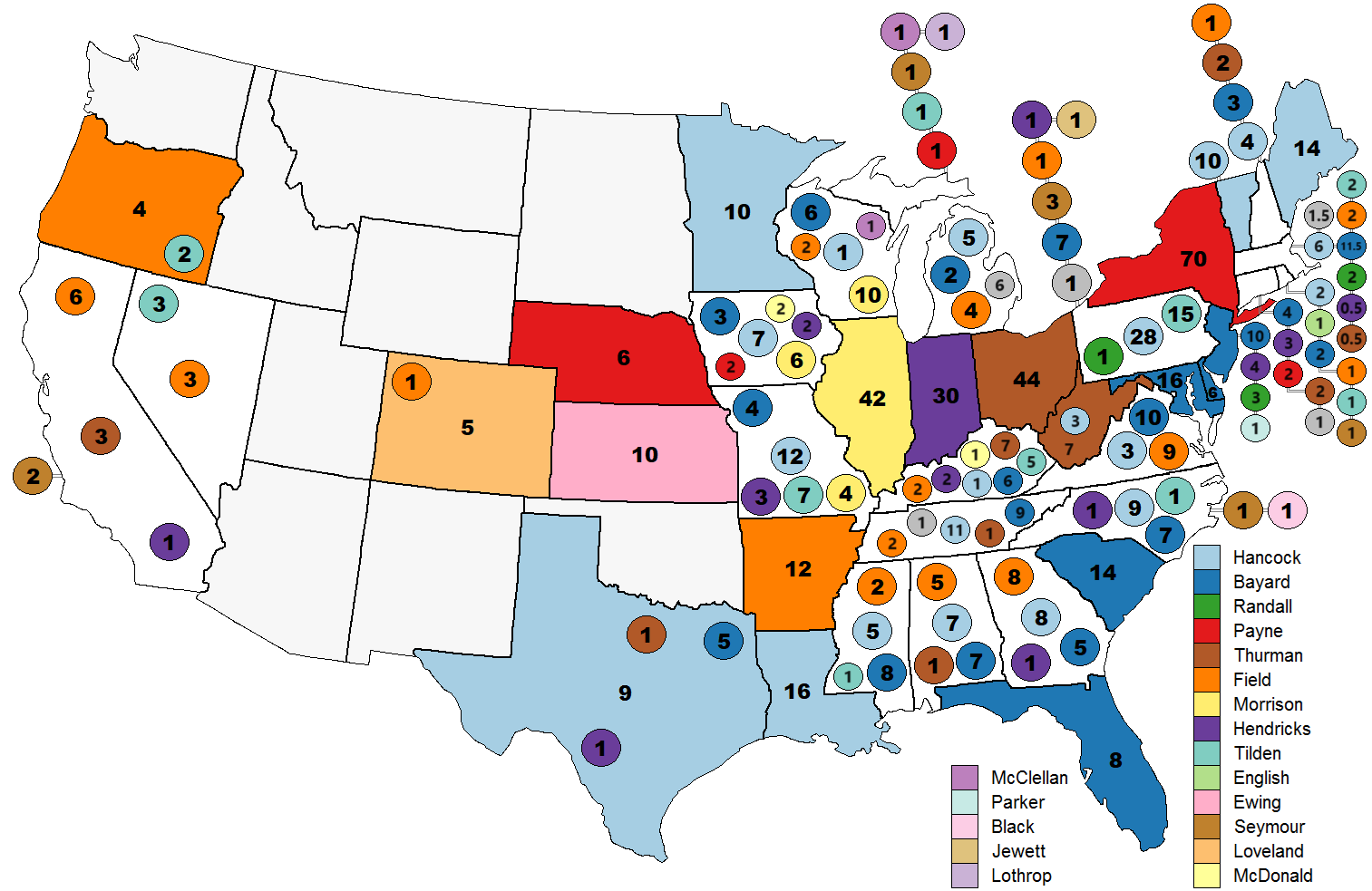
1st Presidential Ballot
After Shifts

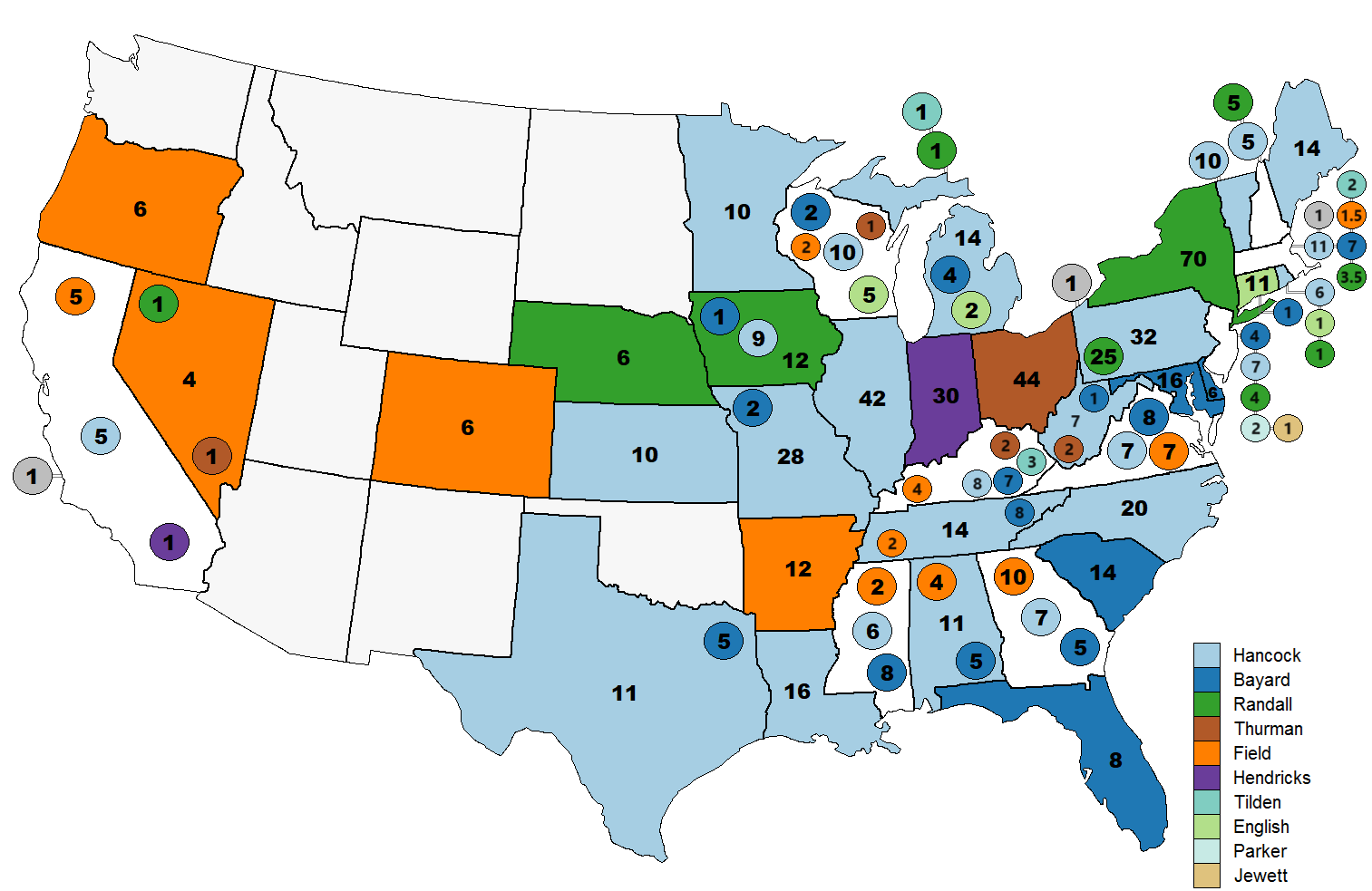
2nd Presidential Ballot
Before Shifts

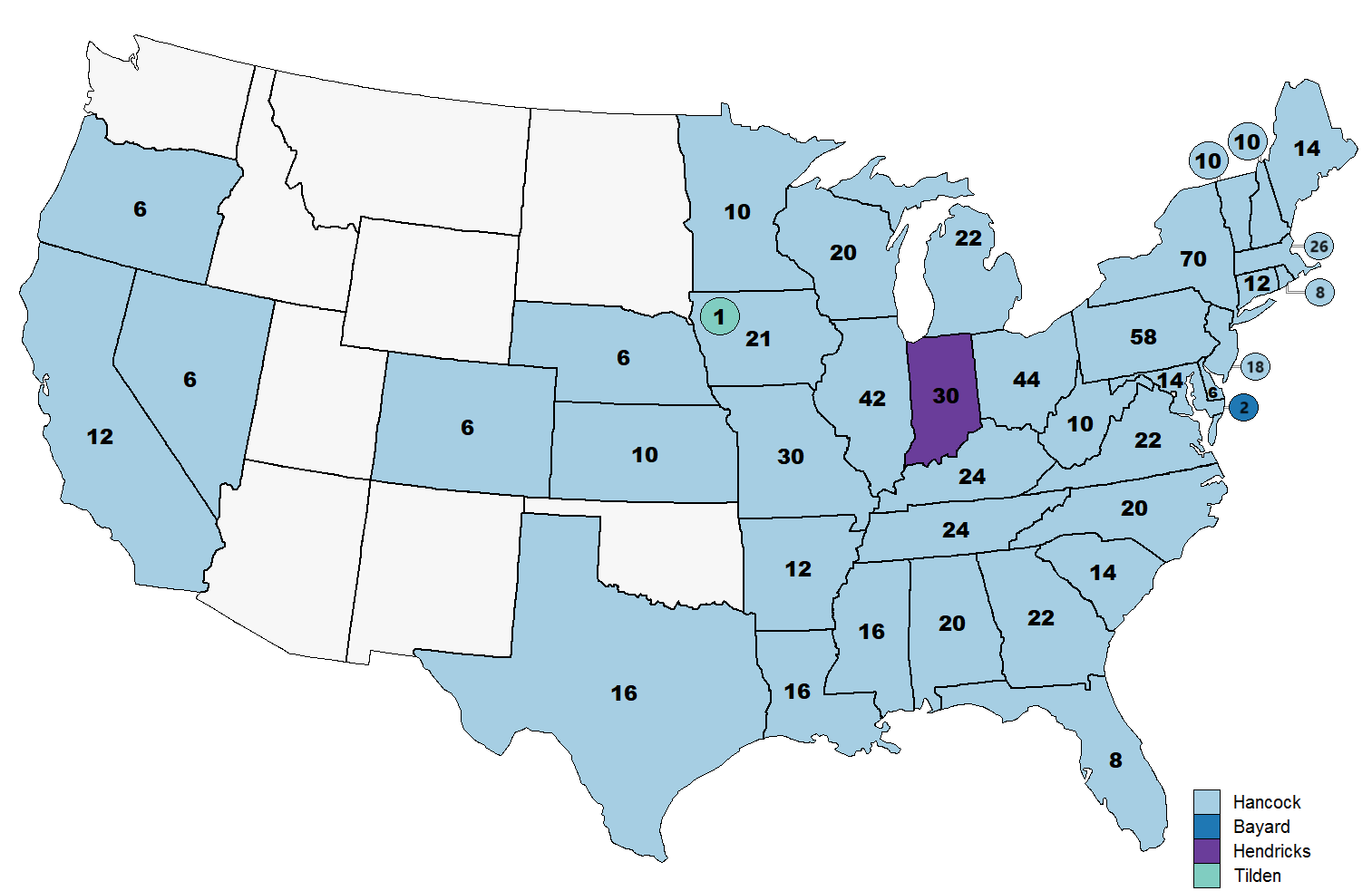
2nd Presidential Ballot
After Shifts

=== Platform and vice presidential nominee ===
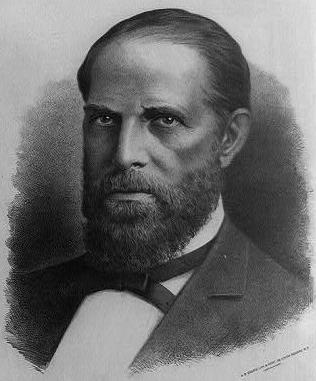
Former Representative William Hayden English of Indiana was nominated for vice president.

Turning to other matters, the delegates listened as Susan B. Anthony addressed them with a plea for women's suffrage. The delegates took no action, and moved on to the platform, which Henry Watterson of Kentucky read aloud. The spirit of unanimity continued as the delegates approved it without dissent. The platform was, in the words of historian Herbert J. Clancy, "deliberately vague and general" on some points, designed to appeal to the largest number possible. In it, they pledged to work for "constitutional doctrines and traditions," to oppose centralization, to favor "honest money consisting of gold and silver", a "tariff for revenue only", and to put an end to Chinese immigration. Most of this was uncontroversial, but the "tariff for revenue only" would become a major point of debate in the coming campaign.

Finally, the delegates turned to the vice presidency. Edmund Pettus, representing Alabama, moved the nomination of William Hayden English, a banker and former representative from Indiana. English, a member of the Indiana delegation, was fairly unknown to most delegates. He had been a Bayard enthusiast and was known as a successful businessman and hard money supporter; more crucially, he hailed from an important swing state. While Hendricks was a better-known representative of Indiana, Easterners in the party preferred English, who they saw as sounder on the money question. Several states seconded the nomination. John P. Irish of Iowa nominated former governor Richard M. Bishop of Ohio but, after all the other states expressed support for English, the Ohio delegation requested that Bishop's name be withdrawn and English's nomination made unanimous; the motion carried.

== Aftermath ==
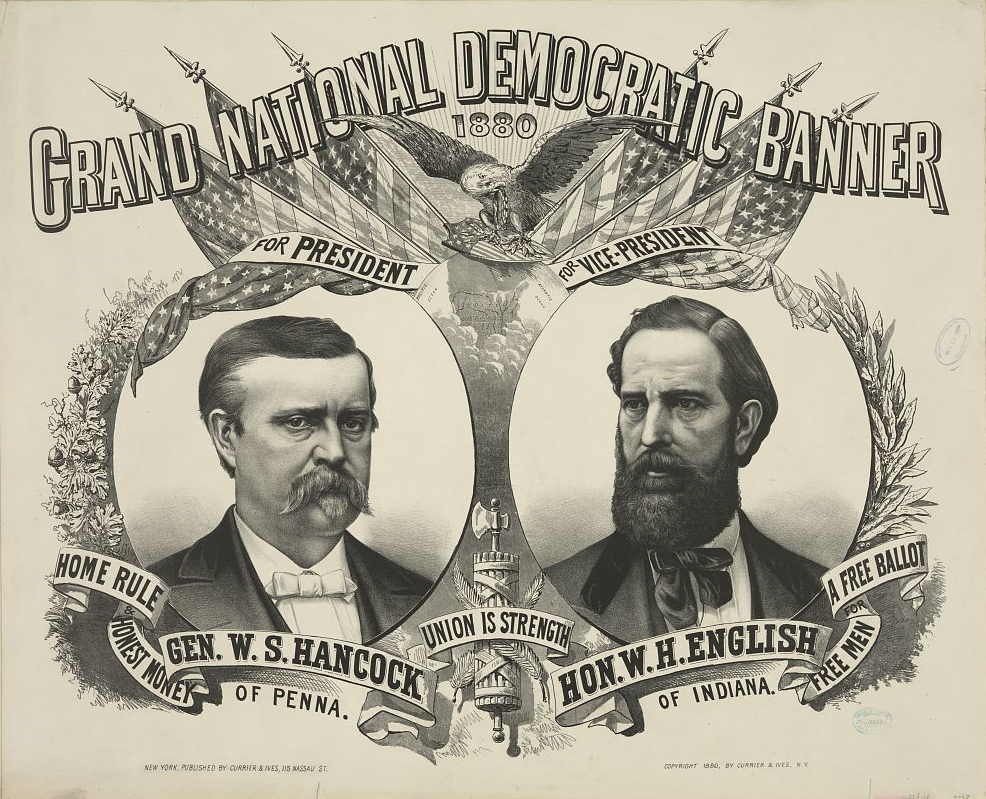
Hancock-English campaign poster

Keeping with the custom at the time, Hancock did not campaign personally, but stayed at his post at Fort Columbus on Governors Island, in New York Harbor and met with visitors there (as General Grant had in 1868, Hancock remained on active duty throughout the campaign). Both parties' campaigns began with a focus on the candidates rather than the issues. Democratic newspapers attacked the Republican nominee, James A. Garfield of Ohio, over rumors of corruption and self-dealing in the Crédit Mobilier affair, among others. Republicans characterized Hancock as uninformed on the issues, and some of his former comrades-in-arms gave critical speeches regarding his character. Democrats never made clear what about their victory would improve the nation; Hancock biographer David M. Jordan later characterized their message as simply "our man is better than your man".

Both parties knew that, with the end of Reconstruction and the disenfranchisement of black Southerners, the South would be solid for Hancock, netting 137 electoral votes of the 185 needed for victory. To this, the Democrats needed only add a few of the closely balanced Northern states; New York (35 electoral votes) and Indiana (15) were two of their main targets, but New Jersey and the Midwestern states were also battlegrounds. Early in the campaign, Republicans used their standard tactic of "waving the bloody shirt", that is, reminding Northern voters that the Democratic Party was responsible for secession and four years of civil war, and that if they held power they would reverse the gains of that war, dishonor Union veterans, and pay Confederate veterans pensions out of the federal treasury. With fifteen years having passed since the end of the war, and Union generals at the head of both tickets, the bloody shirt was of less effect than it had been in the past.

By October, Republicans shifted to a new issue: the tariff. Seizing on the Democratic platform's call for a "tariff for revenue only", Republicans told Northern workers that a Hancock presidency would weaken the tariff protection that kept them in good jobs. Hancock made the situation worse when, attempting to strike a moderate stance, he said "the tariff question is a local question". The answer seemed only to reinforce the Republicans' characterization of him as ignorant of the issues. In the end, fewer than two thousand votes separated the two candidates, but in the Electoral College, Garfield had an easy victory over Hancock, 214 to 155.

Electoral results
| Presidential candidate | Party | Home state | Popular vote | | Electoral vote | Running mate | | |
| Presidential candidate | Party | Home state | Count | Percentage | Electoral vote | Vice-presidential candidate | Home state | Electoral vote |
|---|---|---|---|---|---|---|---|---|
| James A. Garfield | Republican | Ohio | 4,446,158 | 48.3% | 214 | Chester A. Arthur | New York | 214 |
| Winfield S. Hancock | Democratic | Pennsylvania | 4,444,260 | 48.3% | 155 | William H. English | Indiana | 155 |
| James B. Weaver | Greenback Labor | Iowa | 305,997 | 3.3% | 0 | Barzillai J. Chambers | Texas | 0 |
| Neal Dow | Prohibition | Maine | 10,305 | 0.1% | 0 | Henry A. Thompson | Ohio | 0 |
| John W. Phelps | American | Vermont | 707 | 0.0% | 0 | Samuel C. Pomeroy | Kansas | 0 |
| Other | | | 3,631 | 0.0% | — | Other | | — |
| Total | | | 9,211,051 | 100% | 369 | | | 369 |
| Needed to win | | | | | 185 | | | 185 |

== See also ==
- History of the United States Democratic Party
- United States presidential nominating convention
- Winfield Scott Hancock 1880 presidential campaign
- List of Democratic National Conventions
- 1880 Republican National Convention
- 1880 United States presidential election

== Sources ==
Books

- Ackerman, Kenneth D. (2003). Dark Horse: The Surprise Election and Political Murder of President James A. Garfield. New York, New York: Carroll & Graf. ISBN 0-7867-1151-5.
- Clancy, Herbert J. (1958). The Presidential Election of 1880. Chicago, Illinois: Loyola University Press. ISBN 978-1-258-19190-0.
- Flick, Alexander Clarence (1963) [1939]. Samuel Jones Tilden: A Study in Political Sagacity. Port Washington, New York: Kennikat Press, Inc. OCLC 853070572.
- Hoogenboom, Ari (1995). Rutherford Hayes: Warrior and President. Lawrence, Kansas: University Press of Kansas. ISBN 978-0-7006-0641-2.
- House, Albert V. (1935). "Samuel Jackson Randall". Dictionary of American Biography. Vol. XV. New York: C. Scribner's Sons. pp. 350–351.
- Jordan, David M. (1996) [1988]. Winfield Scott Hancock: A Soldier's Life. Bloomington, Indiana: Indiana University Press. ISBN 0-253-21058-5.
- Official Proceedings of the National Democratic Convention. Dayton, Ohio: [Dayton] Daily Journal Book and Job Room. 1882. OCLC 1853492.
- Robinson, Lloyd (2001) [1968]. The Stolen Election: Hayes versus Tilden—1876. New York: Tom Doherty Associates. ISBN 978-0-7653-0206-9.
- Scott, Franklin D. (1935). "William Ralls Morrison". Dictionary of American Biography. Vol. XIII. New York: C. Scribner's Sons. pp. 232–233.
- Smiddy, Betty Ann (2005). Cincinnati's Golden Age. Charleston, South Carolina: Arcadia Publishing. ISBN 978-0-7385-3436-7.
- Tansill, Charles Callan (1946). The Congressional Career of Thomas F. Bayard. Washington, D.C.: Georgetown University Press. OCLC 1518321.
- Tucker, Glenn (1960). Hancock the Superb. Indianapolis, Indiana: Bobbs-Merrill Co., Inc. OCLC 715628.
- Unger, Irwin (1964). The Greenback Era: A Social and Political History of American Finance, 1865–1879. Princeton, New Jersey: Princeton University Press. ISBN 0-691-04517-8.
- Weisenburger, Francis Phelps (1934). "Henry B. Payne". Dictionary of American Biography. Vol. XIV. New York: C. Scribner's Sons. pp. 325–326.
- Wiebe, Robert H. (1967). The Search for Order: 1877–1920. New York, New York: Hill and Wang. ISBN 0-8090-0104-7.
- Woodburn, James A. (1932). "Thomas Andrews Hendricks". Dictionary of American Biography. Vol. VIII. New York: C. Scribner's Sons. pp. 534–535.

Articles

- Guenther, Karen (January 1983). "Potter Committee Investigation of the Disputed Election of 1876". The Florida Historical Quarterly. 61 (3): 281–295. JSTOR 30149125.
- Hirsch, Mark D. (July 1951). "Samuel J. Tilden: The Story of a Lost Opportunity". The American Historical Review. 56 (4): 788–802. doi:10.2307/1851984. JSTOR 1851984.
- House, Albert V. (April 1960). "Internal Conflicts in Key States in the Democratic Convention of 1880". Pennsylvania History. 27 (2): 188–216. JSTOR 27769951.
- House, Albert V. (September 1962). "The Democratic State Central Committee of Indiana in 1880: A Case Study in Party Tactics and Finance". Indiana Magazine of History. 58 (3): 179–210. JSTOR 27789008.
- Peskin, Allan (Spring 1980). "The Election of 1880". The Wilson Quarterly. 4 (2): 172–181. JSTOR 40255831.

Primary sources

- Chester, Edward W A guide to political platforms (1977) pp 105–108 online

Website

- "Historical Election Results: Electoral College Box Scores 1789–1996". National Archives and Records Administration. 2012.

| Preceded by 1876; St. Louis, Missouri | Democratic National Conventions | Succeeded by 1884; Chicago, Illinois |
