= First Unitarian Church of Los Angeles =

Coordinates: 34.057426°N 118.290374°W

First Unitarian Church
- First Unitarian Church of Los Angeles
- First Unity
- First Unitarian Church
- Location: 2936 West 8th Street, Los Angeles, California
- Country: US
- Denomination: Unitarian Universalist Association
- Website: www.uula.org

History
- Founder(s): Theodoric and Caroline Seymour Severance
- Dedication: May 25, 1888

First Unitarian Church of Los Angeles is an independent congregation affiliated with the Unitarian Universalist Association of Congregations. Since its founding in 1877 the church has been a leader in social justice activism for the Unitarian Universalist faith, and for the city of Los Angeles. Its embrace of progressive causes and sometimes radical politics have earned it a reputation as both a place of controversy and a beacon of justice. Its affiliated organization, Urban Partners Los Angeles, provides numerous programs in the neighborhood around the church.

== Location ==
First Unitarian Church is located at 2936 West 8th Street in Los Angeles. Located on the border between the Koreatown and Westlake neighborhoods of Los Angeles, and three blocks from the LA Metro stop at Wilshire and Vermont, First Church serves a racially and economically diverse population.

The neighborhood around First Church was engulfed in the 1992 Los Angeles riots that followed the Rodney King beating in 1991. In response, First Church and other Unitarian Universalist churches in the greater Los Angeles area founded the Unitarian Universalist Urban Ministry offering social service programs that continue to this day under the name Urban Partners Los Angeles.

== Early history ==
The church was founded March 7, 1877, in the home of Theodoric and Caroline Seymour Severance. The Severances had moved to Los Angeles in 1875 from Boston where they had been Unitarians in the congregation of Theodore Parker. The church was officially incorporated under the name Church of the Unity, on May 25, 1888. Originally the congregation met in the Severance home, called "El Nido" (the nest) at 806 West Adams on the corner of what is now Severance Street, near downtown Los Angeles. An official street sign marks the site, now a parking lot for the John Tracy Clinic. Later the fledgling church met at the Odd Fellows Hall on Main Street and then the Union Hall on Spring Street and the Masonic Hall at 133 South Spring Street. In 1887 the church built its first church building at 7th Avenue between Broadway and Hill on land donated to the church by its minister, Eli Fay. The building was dedicated on June 14, 1889, and then destroyed by fire on Easter Sunday, 1891. The Church then found space to meet in a building at Third and Hill owned by the Central Baptist Church, which the Unitarians bought a few months later. This building was moved in 1900 to 925 South Flower Street and remodeled. The church officially changed its name to First Unitarian Church of Los Angeles in June 1907.

== Caroline Severance ==
Caroline Severance was born Caroline Seymour in 1820 in New York. She married Theodoric Severance and moved to Cleveland, Ohio, in 1840. She and her family left the First Presbyterian Church when it would not take a strong stance against slavery and became interested in Unitarianism. In 1850 she became involved in the woman's rights movement and presided over several meetings in Ohio and met the leaders of the eastern woman's movement around this time including Susan B. Anthony and Elizabeth Cady Stanton. In 1855 the family moved to Boston. Here she founded the New England Woman's Club and became a member of Theodore Parker's congregation. She helped found the Free Religious Association after Parker's death. Together with Lucy Stone and other New England suffragists she founded the American Woman Suffrage Association in 1869. In 1875 she and her husband moved to Los Angeles, following two of their sons. In Los Angeles in 1877 Caroline and Theodoric founded the Church of the Unity in their living room, which became the First Unitarian Church of Los Angeles. In 1891 she also founded the Friday Morning Club a woman's club. She worked on numerous civic and social justice causes such as woman's suffrage and the establishment of kindergartens. In 1911, women received the right to vote in the state of California, Caroline Severance registered to vote October 18, 1911, and voted in the presidential election in 1912. She died in Los Angeles in 1914 and is buried in the Angelus-Rosedale Cemetery.

=== Caroline Severance Manor ===
The Caroline Severance Manor is a housing project located beside and behind the First Unitarian Church of Los Angeles. The Caroline Severance Manor offers 85 units of affordable housing for singles and families and subterranean parking for residents and for First Church. The Caroline Severance School located on the ground floor of the eighth street building opened in 2016 and houses a low and no-cost preschool operated by the YMCA. The developer of the project, Mercy Housing, owns and manages the residences. First Church owns the school and the portion of the parking reserved for church use. After 99 years (2111) ownership of the entire building and the property will revert to First Church.

== Architecture ==
Ground was broken for the current church building on October 10, 1926, on three previously vacant lots on 8th Street between Vermont and Westmoreland. The cornerstone was laid on September 18, 1927, in a ceremony officiated by the President of the American Unitarian Association, Samuel A. Eliot. The architects were Allison & Allison. The building is constructed of poured concrete in the Renaissance Revival style. In 1962 a separate religious education building, called the Hardyman Center, was constructed on Francis Avenue behind the existing church. The Hardyman Center was demolished in June 2012 to make way for the Caroline Severance Manor.

== Sunset Hall ==
Sunset Hall was a retirement home for religious liberals founded in 1923 by members of First Church with money raised by the Women's Alliance of First Church. Intended as a means of support for elderly persons with progressive values in the days before social security, the home thrived for several decades before declining and eventually closing. Sunset Hall is the subject of the documentary Sunset Story (2003). The first Sunset Hall was opened at 1424 South Manhattan Place. In 1937, a second home across 15th Street at 1504 South Manhattan Place was opened, the two buildings together housing 16 residents. In 1965, Sunset Hall moved to a building at 2830 Francis Avenue, a few blocks from First Church. By the 1980s occupancy had dwindled as seniors preferred to remain at home until they required a level of medical care that Sunset Hall did not offer. The organization suffered several years of deficits. In 1989, the Directors voted to close the organization but the residents overturned that decision and managed to hold on to the building. The Francis Avenue location finally closed in 2005 with the last remaining residents moved to Bethany Towers in Hollywood. Endowed by the sale of the Francis Avenue property, the Sunset Hall organization continues to provide a variety of senior services and programs at locations throughout the mid-Wilshire and Hollywood areas of Los Angeles.

== Residents of Sunset Hall ==
- Stanton Hodgin, minister of First Unitarian Church of Los Angeles
- Waldemar Hille, music director of First Unitarian Church of Los Angeles

== Rev. Stephen Hole Fritchman ==
Rev. Stephen Hole Fritchman served as the Minister of the First Unitarian Church, Los Angeles from 1948 to 1969. Born to Quaker parents in Cleveland, Ohio May 12, 1902, he spent his early life as a Methodist, including preaching in Methodist pulpits in New York State. He first served a Unitarian church in Petersham, Massachusetts (1930–1932) and then the Bangor Unitarian Church in Maine (1932–1938). From 1938 to 1947 he worked with the denominational headquarters of the American Unitarian Association in Boston as the Youth Director. In 1942 he also became editor of the journal of the AUA, The Christian Register. His work as editor proved controversial and ultimately resulted in his removal as editor in 1947. The following year he was called to the First Unitarian Church of Los Angeles, where he served until his retirement. Under his leadership the church became a center of liberal politics in the Los Angeles area. The church supported Hollywood writers and actors black-listed during the McCarthy era. The church took strong stands against the Korean and Vietnam Wars. He was personally active in many organizations concerned with peace and civil liberties. In 1952 he was invited to Australia, to speak at the centenary of the Melbourne Unitarian Church in November. He applied for a passport in July of that year and on September 17 was notified by the Department of State that his application had been rejected. No reason was given, though it was assumed it was connected with their minister, Victor James', recent attendance at a peace conference in Beijing. In 1976, he received the Annual Award of the UUA for Distinguished Service to the Cause of Liberal Religion. The Unitarian Universalist Service Committee, which he supported all his life, named its annual award after him in his honor. He died in Los Angeles in 1981. His published works include Men of Liberty (a book of short biographies of historical Unitarians intended for young readers), and Heretic: A Partisan Autobiography (Beacon Press, Boston 1977).

== Loyalty oath ==
On February 21, 1954, the First Church congregation voted to refuse to sign a loyalty oath that the State of California had amended to tax documents under the Levering Act which made state recognition of non-profit status contingent on making an oath of allegiance to the United States. Refusal to sign the oath meant the church and its financial donors would lose the benefits associated with non-profit status, a significant financial hardship. The oath required that the church would "not advocate the overthrow of the government of the United States and of the State of California by force or violence or other unlawful means nor advocate the support of a foreign government in the event of hostilities." The church leaders believed that the state's requirement to sign this oath under pressure of losing their tax exempt status was a violation of the First Amendment guarantees of free speech and separation of church and state. They released a press statement saying, "While Unitarians yield to none in the degree of their loyalty to this country, they also yield to none in their determination to protect religious, philosophical and political freedom for every American." They struck out the offending oath and returned the paperwork, resulting in loss of their tax-exempt status. The church then sued the County of Los Angeles to recover the property tax charges weighed by the county. Four years later, on June 30, 1958, the U.S. Supreme Court ruled in favor of First Church in court case: 357 US 545 First Unitarian Church of Los Angeles v. County of Los Angeles, California. In a 7 to 1 decision, with Justice Brennan writing for the majority opinion, the U.S. Supreme Court invalidated the state's loyalty oath requirement. (Chief Justice Earl Warren, who had signed the Levering Act when he was the governor of California prior to joining the court on January 11, 1954, recused himself.)

== Black Unitarians for Radical Reform (BURR) ==
BURR was founded in August 1967 by black members of the First Unitarian Church of Los Angeles and other Los Angeles area UU churches as a means of reforming the Unitarian Universalist faith to be more inclusive of Blacks. In October 1967 the UUA Department on Social Responsibility sponsored a meeting called the "Emergency Conference" to discuss the Unitarian Universalist response to the Black Rebellion, following racial rioting in Newark, New Jersey and Detroit, Michigan. Roy Ockert, the new assistant minister at First Church, received word of the meeting and urged members of BURR to attend. 135–140 persons participated in the "Emergency Conference", 37 of whom were African American. Almost immediately, upon suggestion from black members of BURR from First Church, 30 of the 37 African Americans withdrew to form a Black Unitarian Universalist Caucus (BUUC). BUUC's list of "non-negotiable demands" was presented first to the Conference and then to the UUA Board of Trustees. The core demand was to establish a Black Affairs Council (BAC) to be elected by BUUC and to be funded for four years at $250,000 per year (12% of UUA annual budget). The Black Caucus recommendation of proposals carried a two-thirds majority at the Emergency Conference. In November 1967, "[d]uring a meeting of about 50 members of Pacific Southwest District societies [held at First Church, Los Angeles], Louis Gothard, chair of BURR, reported that the UUA board has rejected the proposal for BAC. The primarily white group immediately constituted itself as Supporters of BURR (SOBURR) and asked Rev. Ockert to draft a resolution urging UU societies and ministers nationally to support BAC, including financially, and to withdraw financial support from the UUA until the next General Assembly. In early 1968, BUUC proceeded with forming BAC in advance of the General Assembly vote. Rev. Ockert was elected as one of the 9 original members of BAC (one of the three white members). In May 1968 delegates at the UUA General Assembly in Cleveland voted to recognize and fund the BAC.

== Oscar Romero Congregation ==
Originally a separate congregation, named for Catholic Archbishop of San Salvador Óscar Romero, nested within First Unitarian Church, Los Angeles. The Oscar Romero Congregation was organized in 1985 around Ricardo Zelada, a refugee from El Salvador given sanctuary within the church. Most of the original members of the Oscar Romero Congregation were asylum seekers from El Salvador, but subsequent members are from many different parts of the Spanish-speaking world. Today, the Oscar Romero group congregation is an affinity group within the main congregation of First Church.

== Ministers ==
- Lay Led (Keola Whittaker (2018-2020), Tyler Smith (2021-2022), and Sarah Pinho (2022-2025) Board Presidents; Antoinette Hollamon (2025-present) Commissioned Lay Minister) (2018–present)
- James Ishmael Ford & Ignacio Castuera (2020–2023), Consulting ministers
- Richard Lee Hoyt-McDaniels (2009–2017)
- Monica Cummings (2004–2008)
- Jade "JD" Benson (2003–2004)
- William Chester McCall III (2002–2003) Interim Minister
- Sherri Cave Pulchalsky (1998–2002)
- Jennie Sykes Knight (1995–1998) Part-time, Intern Minister
- Kenneth R. Brown (1993–1996) Consulting minister
- Linnea Juanita Pearson (1991–1993)
- Al Hendrickson (1990–1991)
- Clayton Gordon (1989–1990, Convener and temporary Acting Minister)
- Thandeka (1980?) Summer minister
- Philip Zwirling (1978–1989)
- Hyun Hwan Kim (1984–1988) Associate Minister
- Michael D. O'Kelly (1977–1978) Interim Minister
- Brooks Walker (1976–1977) Interim Minister
- Peter H. Christiansen (1969–1976)
- Roy A. Ockert (1967–1968) Assistant Minister
- Lewis McGee (1958–1961) Associate Minister. In 1961, Rev. McGee was called to the Chico Unitarian Fellowship (California) becoming the first black man to be called as the Senior Minister of a "white" Unitarian congregation.
- Stephen Hole Fritchman (1948–1969) and emeritus (1969–1981)
- Ernest Caldecott (February 1933 – 1947), co-signer of the Humanist Manifesto
- E. Burdette Backus (1920–1932), co-signer of the Humanist Manifesto
- E. Stanton Hodgin (November 1908 – 1920), author of Confessions of an Agnostic Clergyman (Beacon Press, Boston, 1948)
- E.A. Cantrell (1907–1908)
- Dr. Burt Estes Howard (1905–1908)
- Wesley Haskell (September 1904 – 1905)
- C. J. K. Jones (1898–1904)
- Charles W. Wendte (December 1897 – August 1898)
- John Scott Thomson (1890–1897) (resigned because of his disagreement with the church's liberal attitudes about women. He started his own church, "The Independent Church of Christ" and took many of the church members with him, throwing the Unitarian church into a grave crisis. The Independent Church of Christ continued to exist at least through 1907)
- Eli P. Fay (1885–1890)
- John D. Wells (1877–1881)

== Music directors ==
- Travis Reynolds (2019–present)
- Ryan Humphrey (2015–2018)
- Dr. William Belan (1998–2014) Dr. Belan is also professor of music, emeritus at California State University, Los Angeles.
- Janer Eldridge
- Waldemar Hille (September 1952 – 1986) (born 1908, died December 12, 1995, Long Beach, California). A friend of Pete Seeger, he introduced his friend to the protest song, "We Shall Overcome", which Hille had heard sung by picketing union members in Tennessee in 1946. Hille also worked as an accompanist for Paul Robeson. He edited The People's Song Book (Boni & Gaer, pubs. New York, 1948) and How Can We Keep From Singing! a Contemporary Songbook for Liberal Churches (Hodgin Press of the First Unitarian Church of Los Angeles, Los Angeles. 1976, 197p).
