= Daniel Dougherty =

American lawyer

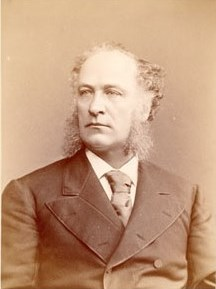
Daniel Dougherty, c. 1876.

Daniel Dougherty (October 15, 1826 – September 5, 1892) was a Philadelphia lawyer involved in Democratic Party politics. Known as a great orator, he is most famous for having delivered the nominating speeches for Winfield Scott Hancock at the 1880 Democratic National Convention and for Grover Cleveland at the 1888 convention.

== Upbringing and law career ==
Dougherty was born in Philadelphia in 1826, the son of an Irish-born surveyor and his native-born wife. From a young age, Dougherty gained a reputation as a natural orator; he made his first political speech in 1847, before he was old enough to vote. Dougherty's family was poor, and he left home at a young age after his mother died and his father remarried to a woman with whom Dougherty did not get along. After several years as a "careless youth," he began to study law at the age of eighteen in the law office of William and Samuel Badger. He was admitted to the Pennsylvania bar in 1849.

His powers of oratory helped him as a lawyer. He achieved an acquittal in a homicide case early in his career when the defendant was widely perceived to be guilty; the result was largely attributed to Dougherty's speech to the jury. The verdict swelled Dougherty's reputation and helped him to build a successful law practice. His gift for composition also led him to enjoy some local success as an amateur poet and playwright. Dougherty's oratorical powers became known to a wider audience in 1856, when he addressed the state Democratic convention to some acclaim. He became friendly with the Pennsylvania-born president, James Buchanan, but came to disagree with Buchanan on the admission to the Union of Kansas as a slave state. In 1860, Dougherty favored Stephen A. Douglas's candidacy for the presidency. When the Civil War began, he supported the Union cause and was among the founders of the Union League of Philadelphia. Dougherty worked for President Abraham Lincoln's reelection in 1864, the only time he did not support the Democratic candidate.

In 1853, Dougherty married Cecilia Helen Gillespie. They had six children: William, Charles, Daniel Jr., Nellie, Frank, and Cecilia. After the war, Dougherty devoted himself completely to his profession, and did not make political speeches for the next decade. He was successful, owning property worth $40,000 and employing three household servants in 1870.

== Democratic orator ==
During the 1876 campaign between Samuel J. Tilden and Rutherford B. Hayes, Dougherty re-entered political life, giving a speech on behalf of Tilden, the Democrat, at the Cooper Union in New York City. In 1880, he attended the Democratic National Convention as a supporter of fellow-Pennsylvanian Winfield Scott Hancock. Although he was not a member of the delegation, a delegate ceded Dougherty his place on the floor to allow the orator to make the speech placing Hancock's name in nomination. His speech was brief, but powerful in praise of Hancock:

I present ... one who, on the field of battle, was styled "the Superb,"...Whose nomination will thrill the land from end to end and crush the last embers of sectional strife, and be hailed as the dawning of the longed-for day of perpetual brotherhood. ... With him as our chieftain, the bloody banner of the Republicans will fall from their palsied grasp. We can appeal to the supreme tribunal of the American people against the corruptions of the republican party and its untold violations of constitutional liberty. Oh, my countrymen! In this supreme moment – the destinies of the Republic – the imperiled liberties of the people, hang breathlessly on your deliberations. Pause! Reflect! Beware! Make no misstep!

After the speech, the delegates cheered Hancock for five minutes. Dougherty's speech, described as "eloquent, epigrammatic, and fascinating," introduced him to a national audience. The next day, Hancock was nominated, but was defeated in the general election in November.

After the election, Dougherty continued his successful legal career. In 1887, he represented New York alderman Thomas Cleary in a bribery case, and Cleary was found not guilty. He moved to New York the next year and became affiliated with the Tammany Hall branch of the Democratic party. That same year, he traveled to St. Louis with the New York delegation to the Democratic National Convention. Again, Dougherty was chosen to give a nominating speech, this time of the incumbent, President Grover Cleveland. Again, his speech was well-received:

We are not, indeed, to choose a candidate, but to name one the people have already chosen. He is the man for the people. ... Eight years ago, unknown, save in his own locality: he, for the last four years, has stood in the gaze of the world, discharging the most exalted duties that can be confided to a mortal. ... His fidelity in the past inspires faith in the future. He is not a hope. He is a realization.

Cleveland, too, was nominated, but was defeated in his bid for re-election that November.

Dougherty used his powers of persuasion in the religious sphere, as well, addressing the Roman Catholic Lay Congress at Baltimore in 1889. According to The New York Times, his address there was of "unsurpassed strength and beauty," and was considered "the masterpiece of his life." The speech was also the last of his famous addresses. Dougherty moved back to Philadelphia and died at his home there on September 5, 1892. He was buried at St. John the Evangelist Church in Philadelphia.

== Sources ==
Books

- Clancy, Herbert J. (1958). The Presidential Election of 1880. Chicago, Illinois: Loyola University Press. ISBN 978-1-258-19190-0.
- Jordan, David M. (1996) [1988]. Winfield Scott Hancock: A Soldier's Life. Bloomington, Indiana: Indiana University Press. ISBN 0-253-21058-5.
- Official Proceedings of the [1880] National Democratic Convention. Dayton, Ohio: [Dayton] Daily Journal Book and Job Room. 1882.
- Official Proceedings of the [1888] National Democratic Convention. St. Louis, Missouri: Woodward & Tiernan Printing Company. 1888.
- White, James Terry, ed. (1894). "Dougherty, Daniel". The National Cyclopaedia of American Biography. Vol. V. New York, New York: Daniel G. F. Class. p. 477. OCLC 1759175.

Articles

- Hall, A. Oakey (April 1897). "Daniel Dougherty and the Philadelphia Bar". The Green Bag. 9 (4): 141–146.
- Lallou, William J. (1912). "The Vaults in St. John Churchyard". Records of the American Catholic Historical Society of Philadelphia. 23: 233–234.

Census

- Ninth Census of the United States. 1870. Philadelphia; roll M593 1393, page 223B, line 15–26, enumeration district Ward 8 District 24, Philadelphia, Pennsylvania, Family History film 552892.

Newspaper

- "Daniel Dougherty Dead" (PDF). The New York Times. September 6, 1892.
