= Winfield Scott Hancock 1880 presidential campaign =

American political campaign

Winfield Scott Hancock for President
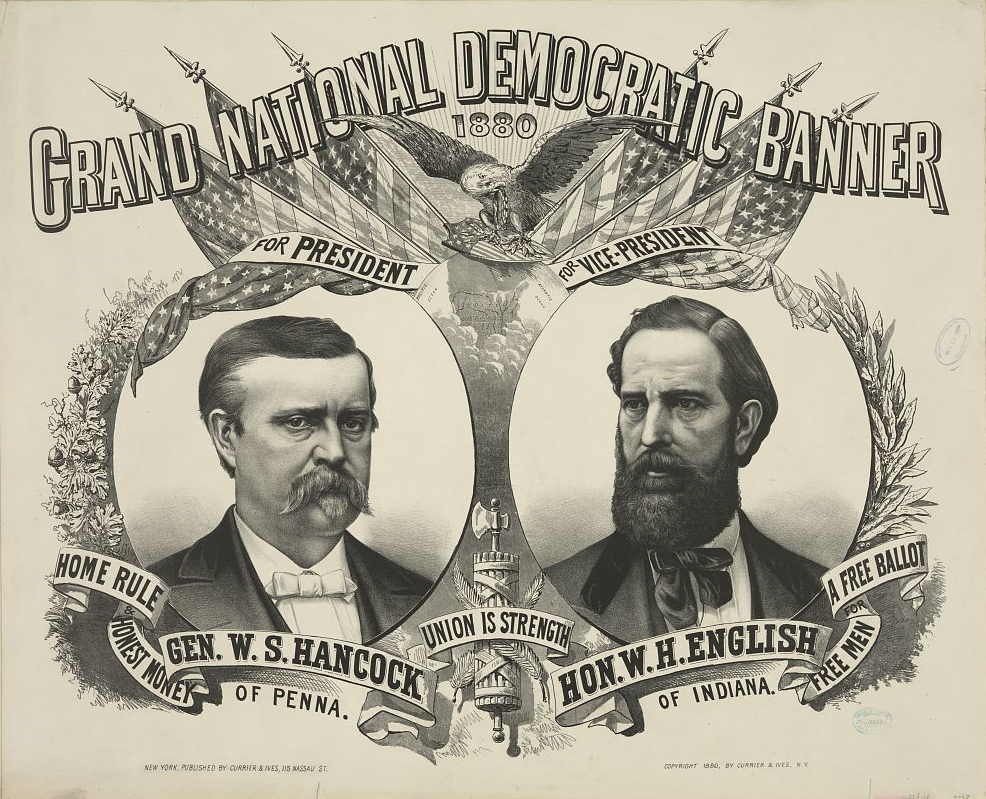
- Campaign: U.S. presidential election, 1880
- Candidate: Winfield Scott Hancock; Major General (1844–1886); William Hayden English; U.S. Representative for Indiana's 2nd district (1853-1861)
- Affiliation: Democratic Party
- Status: Lost general election: November 2, 1880

After serving one term as U.S. President, Rutherford B. Hayes announced that he would not seek re-election in 1880. Thus, the 1880 election ended up being fought between Republican James A. Garfield, the winner, and Democrat Winfield Scott Hancock.

== Democratic nomination fight ==
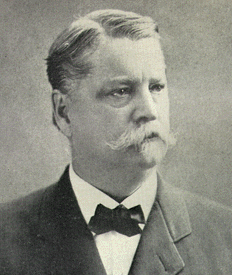
Winfield Scott Hancock

After winning control of both houses of the U.S. Congress in 1878, Democrats felt that voters could elect a Democrat as U.S. President for the first time in 24 years. Early frontrunner 1876 Democratic candidate and former New York Governor Samuel J. Tilden decided not to run because of his health and the opposition of Tammany Hall leader John Kelly.

With Tilden's withdrawal, other Democrats entered the race; however, they all had issues. Senator Thomas Bayard of Delaware alienated soft-money supporters with his hard-money stance; his initial support of Southern secession during the American Civil War had also made him vulnerable to Republican attacks. House Speaker Samuel J. Randall was unwilling to campaign and further damaged by Tilden's refusal to endorse him. Meanwhile, 1868 Democratic nominee and former New York Governor Horatio Seymour declined to run again.

Other candidates failed to attract significant support. The party settled on former Union general Winfield Scott Hancock. He was acceptable to all factions of the party, had a reputation for integrity, and had no negatives. Hancock won the Democratic nomination with 705 delegates on the second ballot at the 1880 Democratic National Convention. Former Indiana congressman William Hayden English was selected as Hancock's running mate.

== Campaign ==
The 1880 Democratic platform was kept vague to hold the party together and avoid alienating any voters. During the campaign, Hancock and the Democrats attacked James A. Garfield, the Republican nominee, for his involvement in the Credit Mobilier scandal and his alleged support of unlimited Chinese immigration as evidenced by the forged Morey letter, which Garfield publicly denied having written. Meanwhile, Republicans attacked the Democrats by associating them with the Confederacy and calling attention to their alleged support for low protective tariffs in contrast to Republican support for higher tariffs. Republicans made much of Hancock's statement that "the tariff question is a local question". The former general had meant merely that it was for the voters to decide through their elected representatives in Congress, but it was used to suggest he did not understand the issue. Republicans avoided direct attacks on Hancock's character, instead focusing on his lack of political experience. They also circulated partisan rumors about how he had allegedly plotted to overthrow President Lincoln during the Civil War and had engaged in corrupt business practices while serving in Louisiana during Reconstruction.

== Results ==
Garfield ended up winning the popular vote by less than 0.1% (less than 10,000 votes) although he took a 214–155 majority of the Electoral College. Garfield won New York, Indiana, and Connecticut, all of which had voted for Tilden in 1876, allowing him to defeat Hancock. The Morey letter may have helped Hancock narrowly win both California and Nevada.
