= William D. Bynum =

American politician

William Bynum
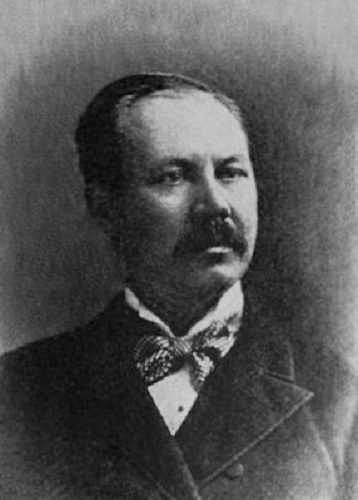
- Bynum, c. 1892

Member of the U.S. House of Representatives from Indiana's 7th district
- In office March 4, 1885 – March 3, 1895
- Preceded by: William E. English
- Succeeded by: Charles L. Henry

Personal details
- Born: William Dallas Bynum; June 26, 1846 near Newberry, Indiana, U.S.
- Died: October 21, 1927 (aged 81) Indianapolis, Indiana, U.S.
- Resting place: Oak Grove Cemetery in Washington, Indiana
- Party: Democratic
- Education: Indiana University, Bloomington (BA)

William Dallas Bynum (June 26, 1846 – October 21, 1927) was an American lawyer and politician who served five consecutive terms as a U.S. representative from Indiana from 1885 to 1895.

== Biography ==
Bynum was born near Newberry, Indiana and graduated from Indiana University in 1869, having studied the law. After graduating, he was admitted to the bar in 1872, and set up practice in Washington, Indiana, where he served as City Clerk, City Attorney, and Mayor. In 1882, he was elected as a state representative.

Following his time in the Indiana House of Representatives, he spent years in Washington, D.C. as a member of Congress, chairman of the National Democratic Party, and President McKinley's commission to codify American criminal law. In his later years, he returned to Indiana and died of acute myocarditis in 1927.

== Political life ==
He was Washington's first City Clerk. He was City Attorney from 1871 until 1875, and Mayor from 1876 until 1879.

=== Early political career ===
In 1882, he was elected as a member of the Indiana House of Representatives from Daviess County, serving as House Speaker in 1885. He briefly practiced law in Indianapolis before being elected to Congress.

=== Congress ===
Bynum was elected as a Democrat to the Forty-ninth and to the four succeeding Congresses (March 4, 1885 – March 3, 1895). For part of that time he was House Minority Whip.

In 1890, Bynum denounced congressman James Campbell as a "liar and a perjurer" after congressman Campbell was accused of forgery. House Republicans censured Bynum for using "unparliamentary language" in a vote along party lines. Bynum received the full support of House Democrats: as he received his punishment, the Democratic side stood up in support of Bynum. As of 2024, Bynum is one of only 25 members of the House that have been censured.

He was an unsuccessful candidate for reelection in 1894 to the Fifty-fourth Congress.

=== Later career ===
Remaining in the nation's capital, Bynum was active in the organization of the National (Gold-Standard) Democratic Party, in 1896. He chaired its national committee through 1898.

In 1900, Bynum was appointed by President McKinley to be a member of a commission to codify the United States' criminal laws. He served on the commission until 1906.

He then returned to Indiana and retired from the practice of law.

=== Death and burial ===
He died in Indianapolis on October 21, 1927, and was interred in Oak Grove Cemetery, in Washington, Indiana.

== See also ==
- List of United States representatives expelled, censured, or reprimanded

U.S. House of Representatives
Preceded by William E. English	Member of the U.S. House of Representatives from Indiana's 7th congressional district 1885–1895	Succeeded by Charles L. Henry
