= William E. English =

American politician (1850–1926)

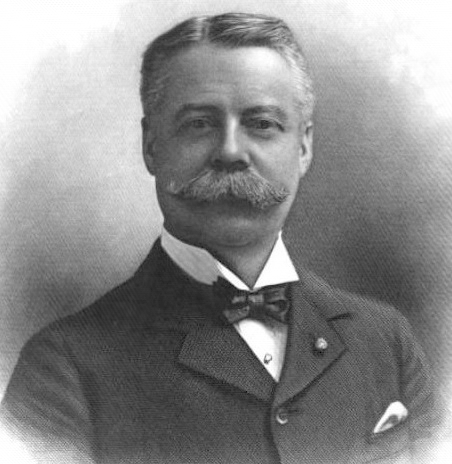

Member of the U.S. House of Representatives from Indiana's 7th district
- In office May 22, 1884 – March 3, 1885
- Preceded by: Stanton J. Peelle
- Succeeded by: William D. Bynum

Personal details
- Born: William Eastin English; November 3, 1850 Englishton Park, Lexington, Indiana, U.S.
- Died: April 29, 1926 (aged 75) Indianapolis, Indiana, U.S.
- Resting place: Crown Hill Cemetery and Arboretum, Section 1, Lot 72; 39.8195093°N 86.1731432°W
- Party: Republican
- Other political affiliations: Democratic (1882-1900)
- Parent: William Hayden English (father)

William Eastin English (November 3, 1850 – April 29, 1926) was an American attorney and politician, a U.S. Representative from Indiana. He was the son of vice-presidential candidate and businessman William Hayden English, and his wife Emma Mardulia Jackson.

== Early life and education ==
Born at Englishton Park, near Lexington, Indiana, William was the son of businessman William Hayden English, and his wife Emma Mardulia Jackson. He was given a middle name after his maternal grandmother Mahala Eastin of Kentucky, whose immigrant ancestor was said to be a French Huguenot, D'Estaing, from southwestern France.

In 1865, the English family relocated to Indianapolis. His father got involved in politics and business and finally accumulated substantial real estate holdings. There the boy attended public and private schools. He was graduated in 1873 from the law department of the Northwestern Christian University (now Butler University) at Indianapolis.

== Law practice and politics ==
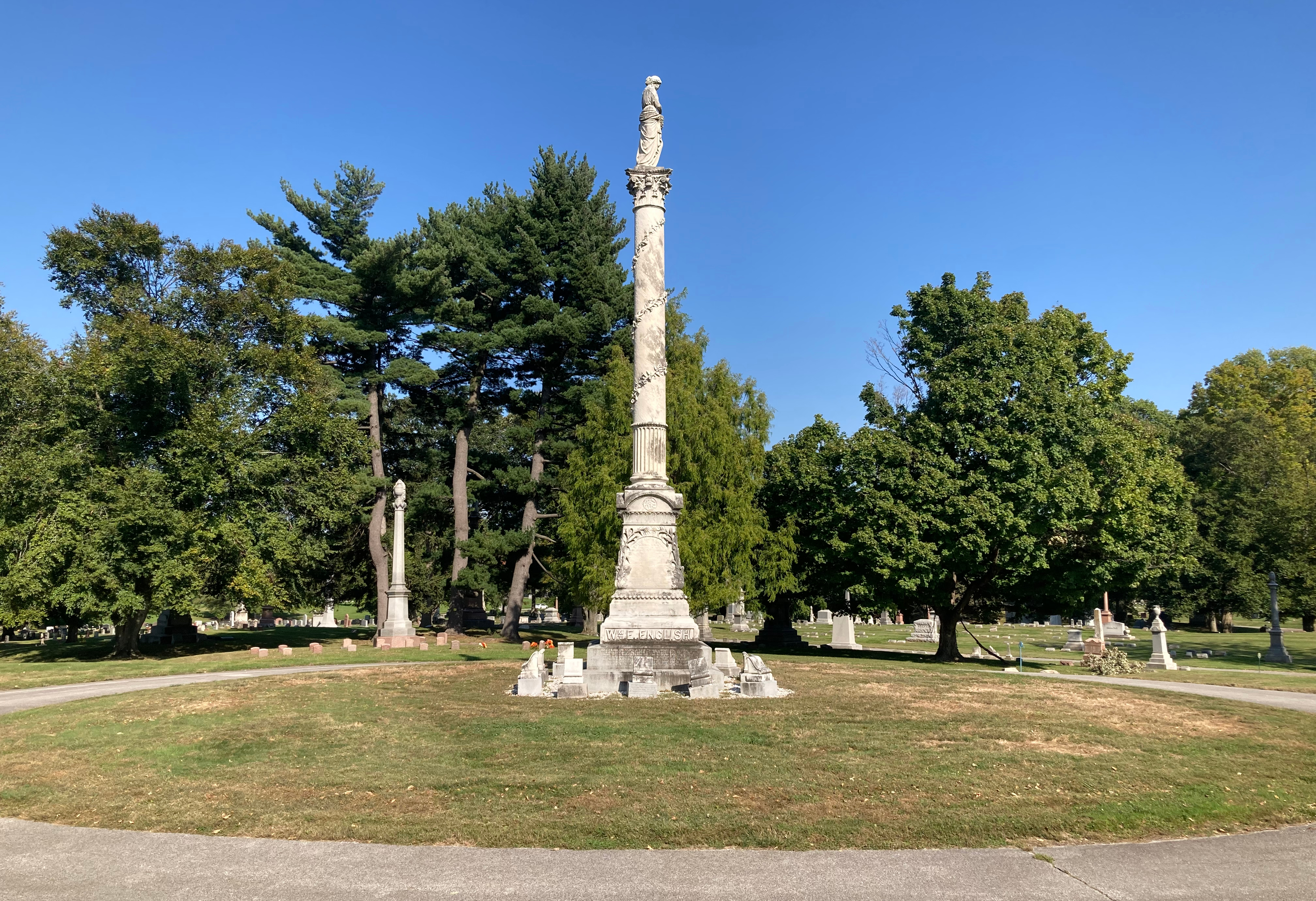
English's grave at Crown Hill Cemetery

English was admitted to the bar the same year and set up his practice in Indianapolis. He worked at law until 1882, when he ran for Congress.

English was first elected to office in 1880 as a member of the State house of representatives. That year his father turned over to him management of English's Opera House, which he had just built in Indianapolis. The younger English was interested in theater and had just married an actress, Annie Fox.

English successfully contested as a Democrat the election in 1882 of Stanton J. Peelle to the Forty-eighth Congress; English was eventually seated, serving from May 22, 1884, to March 3, 1885.

He declined to be a candidate for renomination in 1884 and resumed his former business pursuits at Indianapolis. He served as delegate to the Democratic National Conventions in 1892 and 1896, and chairman of the committee on rules and order of business in the former. He left the Democratic Party in 1900 and became active in the Republican Party.

In the Spanish–American War (1896–1898), English served as captain and aide-de-camp on the staff of Gen. Joseph Wheeler.

Re-entering politics, English served as delegate to the Republican National Convention in 1912. He was elected in 1916 to the Indiana State senate. He was reelected in 1920 and again in 1924, serving until his death in Indianapolis, Indiana on April 29, 1926.

He was interred in Crown Hill Cemetery.

U.S. House of Representatives
Preceded by Stanton J. Peelle	Member of the U.S. House of Representatives from Indiana's 7th congressional district May 22, 1884 – March 3, 1885	Succeeded by William D. Bynum
