= William Hayden English =

American politician (1822–1896)

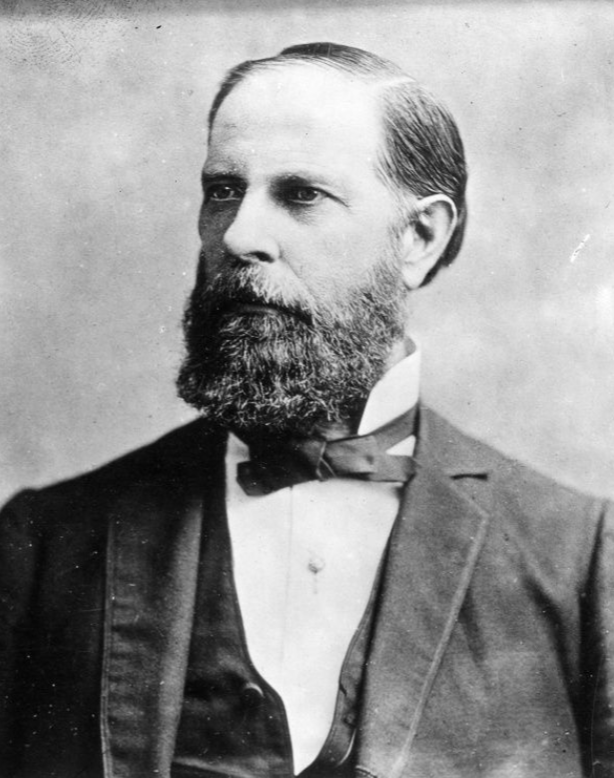

Member of the U.S. House of Representatives from Indiana's 2nd district
- In office March 4, 1853 – March 3, 1861
- Preceded by: Cyrus L. Dunham
- Succeeded by: James A. Cravens

Speaker of the Indiana House of Representatives
- In office March 8, 1852 – June 21, 1852
- Preceded by: John Wesley Davis
- Succeeded by: Oliver Brooks Torbet

Member of the Indiana House of Representatives
- In office 1851–1853

Personal details
- Born: William Hayden English; August 27, 1822 Lexington, Indiana, U.S.
- Died: February 7, 1896 (aged 73) Indianapolis, Indiana, U.S.
- Resting place: Crown Hill Cemetery and Arboretum, Section 1, Lot 72; 39.8195093°N 86.1731432°W
- Party: Democratic
- Spouse: Emma Jackson
- Children: 2, including William
- Education: Hanover College (no degree)

William Hayden English (August 27, 1822 – February 7, 1896) was an American politician. He served as a U.S. representative from Indiana from 1853 to 1861 and was the Democratic Party's nominee for Vice President of the United States in 1880.

English retired from the House in 1861, but remained involved in party affairs. In the American Civil War he was a War Democrat, supporting the Union war effort. As well as pursuing a political career, he was an author and businessman. He owned an opera house, was president of a bank, and developed many residential properties. English was successful in business, and became one of the wealthiest men in Indiana. After nearly two decades in the private sector, English returned to political life as the Democratic nominee for vice president in 1880. English and his presidential running mate, Winfield Scott Hancock, lost narrowly to their Republican opponents, James A. Garfield and Chester A. Arthur.

== Family and early career ==
William Hayden English was born August 27, 1822 in Lexington, Indiana, the only son of Elisha Gale English and his wife, Mahala (Eastin) English. Both his parents were Kentucky natives from slaveholding families of English and French Huguenot ancestry. They moved to southern Indiana in 1818. Elisha English quickly became involved in local politics as a Democrat, serving in the state legislature as well as building a prominent business career. William English was educated in the local public schools, later attending Hanover College. He left college after three years and began to read law. In 1840, English was admitted to the bar at the age of eighteen and soon built a practice in his native Scott County. He started early in politics as well, attending the state Democratic convention that same year and giving speeches on behalf of the Democratic presidential candidate, Martin Van Buren.

From the end of 1842, English was mentored by Lieutenant Governor Jesse D. Bright, who helped him rise within Bright's faction of the party. The following year, the Indiana House of Representatives selected English as their clerk. In 1844, he worked the campaign trail, this time in the service of presidential candidate James K. Polk.

== Politics and marriage ==
As a reward, after Polk took office in 1845, he granted English a patronage appointment as a clerk in the federal Treasury Department in Washington, D.C. English held this position for four years, during which time he met Emma Mardulia Jackson. They married in November 1847. They had two children: William Eastin and Rosalind.

English attended the 1848 Democratic National Convention in Baltimore, where he supported Lewis Cass, the eventual presidential nominee. With the election of the Whig Party's candidate, Zachary Taylor, to the presidency, a Whig party member replaced English at the Treasury Department. He secured a job as clerk to the United States Senate's Claims Committee through party connections; (Note: Bright, now a Senator, was a member of the committee.) serving until 1850 in Washington.

English and his wife then returned to Indiana, where he worked as secretary to the Indiana constitutional convention. Democrats were in the majority at the convention, and their proposals were incorporated into the new law, including increasing the number of elective offices, guaranteeing a homestead exemption, and restricting voting rights to white men. Free blacks had formerly had suffrage in the state. The voters approved the new constitution by a large majority.

In August 1851, English won his first election to the state House of Representatives. As it was the first meeting of the legislature under the 1851 constitution, English's knowledge of it contributed to his election as speaker of the House at the age of twenty-nine. The House had a Democratic majority and, at Bright's direction, English worked for the election of Graham N. Fitch, a member of Bright's faction of the party, to the U.S. Senate. The legislature chose a different Democrat, John Pettit, instead. (Note: Before the passage of the Seventeenth Amendment to the United States Constitution in 1913, senators were chosen by their states' legislatures.) Holding the office of Speaker increased English's influence throughout the state; in 1852, the Democrats chose him as their nominee for the federal House of Representatives from the newly reconfigured 2nd district. The Democrats were victorious in the election that October, sweeping all but one House seat. English defeated his Whig opponent 55% – 45% and joined the 33rd Congress when it convened in Washington in 1853.

English's time in Congress, much like the rest of his political career, can be seen as pragmatic. While he morally abhorred slavery, he condemned abolitionists and believed in the notion of "popular sovereignty," which argued that the people of a state or territory should choose for themselves whether to have slavery. He explained his opinion in a speech in 1854:

Sir, I am a native of a free State [sic], and have no love for the institution of slavery. Aside from the moral question involved, I regard it as an injury to the State where it exists….But sir, I never can forget that we are a confederacy of States, possessing equal rights, under our glorious Constitution. That if the people of Kentucky believe the institution of slavery would be conducive to their happiness, they have the same right to establish and maintain that we of Indiana have to reject it; and this doctrine is just as applicable to States hereafter to be admitted as to those already in the Union.

== Congress ==
=== Kansas–Nebraska Act ===
The House of Representatives convened for the 33rd Congress in December 1853. At that time, the simmering disagreement between the free and slave states heated up with the introduction of the Kansas–Nebraska Act, proposed by Illinois Democrat Stephen A. Douglas, which would open the Kansas and Nebraska territories to slavery, an implicit repeal of the Missouri Compromise of 1820. Intended to quiet national agitation over slavery by shifting the decision to local settlers, Douglas's proposal instead inflamed anti-slavery sentiment in the North by allowing the possibility of slavery's expansion to territories held as free soil for three decades. English, a member of the Committee on Territories, thought the bill was unnecessary and disagreed with its timing; when the committee approved the bill, English wrote a minority report to that effect. He was not altogether opposed to the principle of popular sovereignty, however, believing that "each organized community ought to be allowed to decide for itself". Northern Democrats divided almost evenly on the bill, but English, despite his stated reservations, was among those who voted for it. In doing so, he said that Congress was bound to respect the decision of the territories' residents and pledged to uphold their decisions. (Note: Many in Congress did not agree they were so bound, and this was a point of contention in the debates.) President Franklin Pierce signed the bill into law on May 30, 1854.

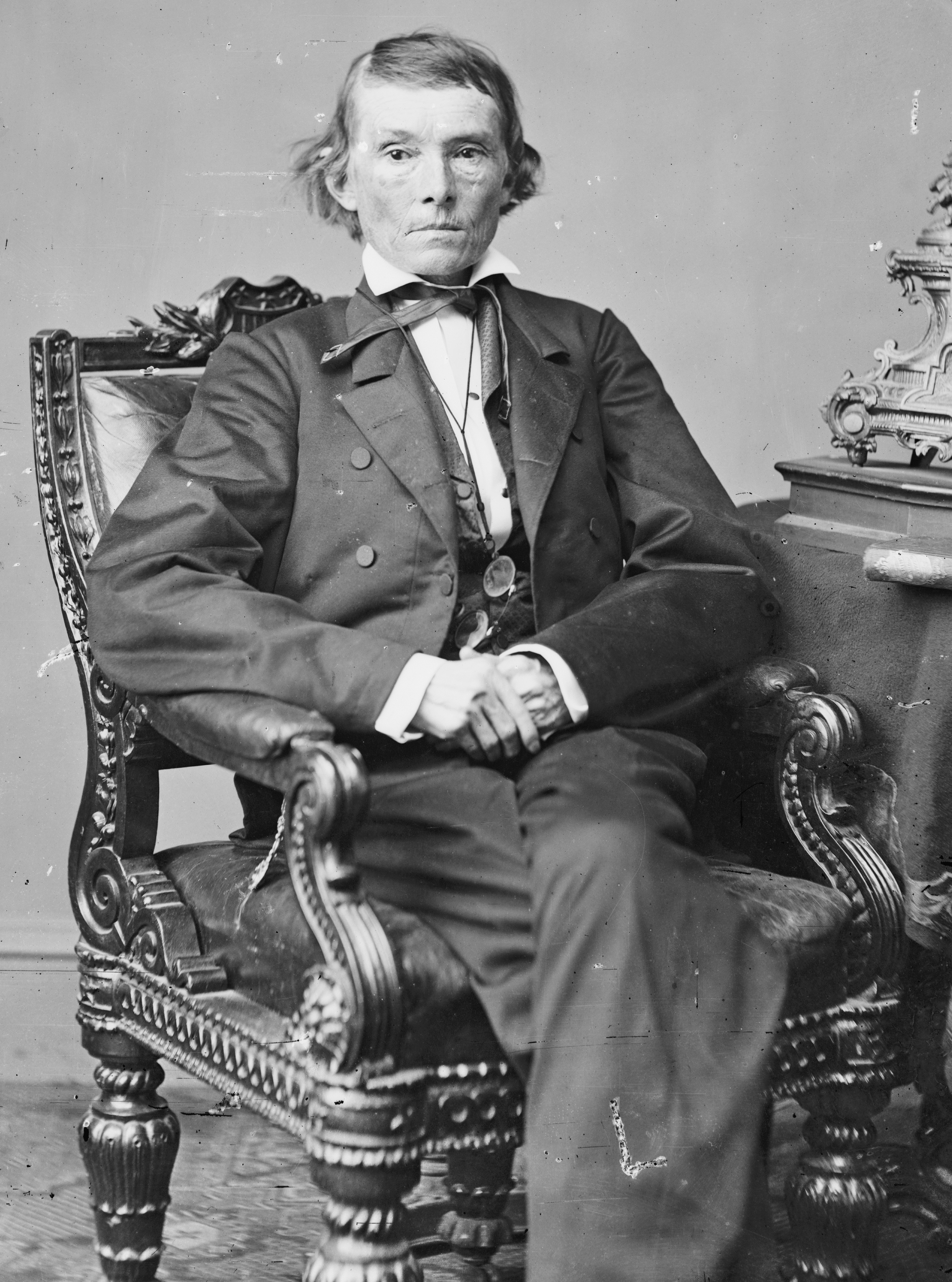
English worked with Senator Alexander H. Stephens on the compromise legislation later called the English Bill.

The Kansas–Nebraska Act was grossly unpopular across the North. The reaction ultimately killed the Whig Party, weakened northern Democrats, and brought about a new party, the Republicans. Only 3 of 42 free-state representatives were reelected after voting for it; English was one of them. English was a conservative Democrat, and his southern Indiana district, while not pro-slavery, also had little sympathy for abolitionism. He was reelected again in 1856, when the Democrats regained the House majority in the 35th Congress. The Speaker, James Lawrence Orr, assigned English to the Post Office and Post Roads Committee, but the issue of Kansas claimed more of his time.

=== English Bill ===
In December 1857, in an election boycotted by free-state partisans, Kansas adopted the pro-slavery Lecompton Constitution and petitioned Congress to be admitted as a slave state. President James Buchanan, a Democrat, urged that Congress take up the matter, and the Senate approved a bill to admit Kansas. The bill was defeated in the House, 112–120. English found the process by which the pro-slavery Kansans forced through their constitution inadequate, and voted against admission. Congress continued to debate the matter for months without resolution. English and Georgia Democrat Alexander H. Stephens came up with a compromise measure, later called the English Bill. The English Bill offered Kansas admission as a slave state, but only if the people endorsed that choice in a referendum. The Bill also required Kansans to renounce the unusually large grant of federal lands they had requested in the Lecompton Constitution. The Kansas voters could, thus, reject Lecompton by the face-saving measure of turning down the smaller land grant. Congress passed the English Bill, and Kansans duly rejected their pro-slavery constitution by a ratio of six to one. Some of English's political allies, including Bright (now a senator), would have preferred that Kansas be admitted as a slave state, but the decision was popular enough in his district to allow English to be reelected in 1858 with a majority of 56% to 44%.

== Business career ==
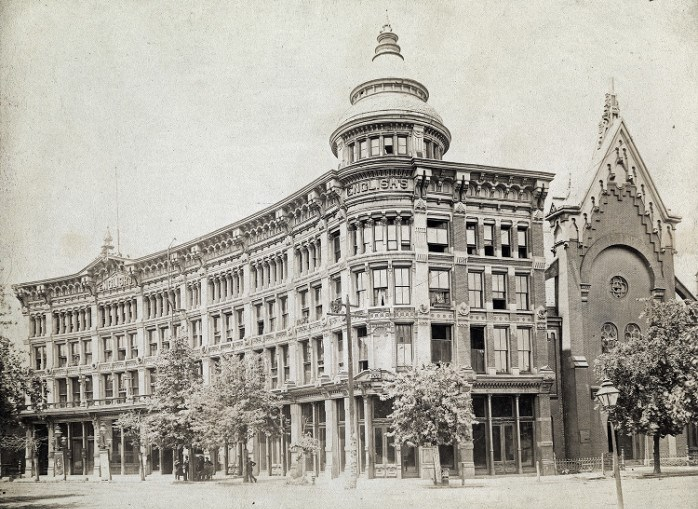
English's Opera House

English declined to run for reelection in 1860 but he gave several speeches advocating compromise and moderation in the growing North-South divide. After Abraham Lincoln's election that year, English urged Southerners not to secede. After southern secession occurred and the Civil War began, Governor Oliver P. Morton offered English command of a regiment, but he declined it since he had no military knowledge or interests. English, however, supported Morton's (and indirectly Lincoln's) war policies and considered himself a War Democrat. English lent money to the state government to cover the expenses of outfitting the troops and served as provost marshal for the 2nd congressional district.

After retiring from Congress, English spent a year at his home in Scott County before he relocated to Indianapolis, the state capital. English and ten associates (including James Lanier) organized the First National Bank of Indianapolis in 1863, the first bank in that city chartered under the new National Bank Act. He remained president of that bank until 1877, including the difficult period during the Panic of 1873, when many other banks folded.

English's business interests included other industries as well. He became the controlling shareholder of the Indianapolis Street Railway Company and remained in charge of the company until 1876, when he sold his shares. Having also sold his shares of the bank by 1877, English turned most of his investment capital to real estate. By 1875, he had ordered construction of 75 houses along what is now English Avenue.

His wife, Emma, died two years later, in 1877. He survived her by 19 years. When he died in 1896, he owned 448 properties, most of them in Indianapolis.

In 1880, English constructed English's Opera House, which, according to the 1994 Encyclopedia of Indianapolis, quickly became known as the city's finest. The building was modeled after the Grand Opera House in New York and seated 2,000 people. It opened on September 27, 1880, with a performance of Hamlet starring Lawrence Barrett. By that time, English was involved in politics once more. He turned over management of the Opera House to his son, William Eastin English, who was interested in the theater and had just married an actress, Annie Fox. English Sr. later added a hotel to the Opera House, and both operated until 1948.

== Vice-presidential candidate ==
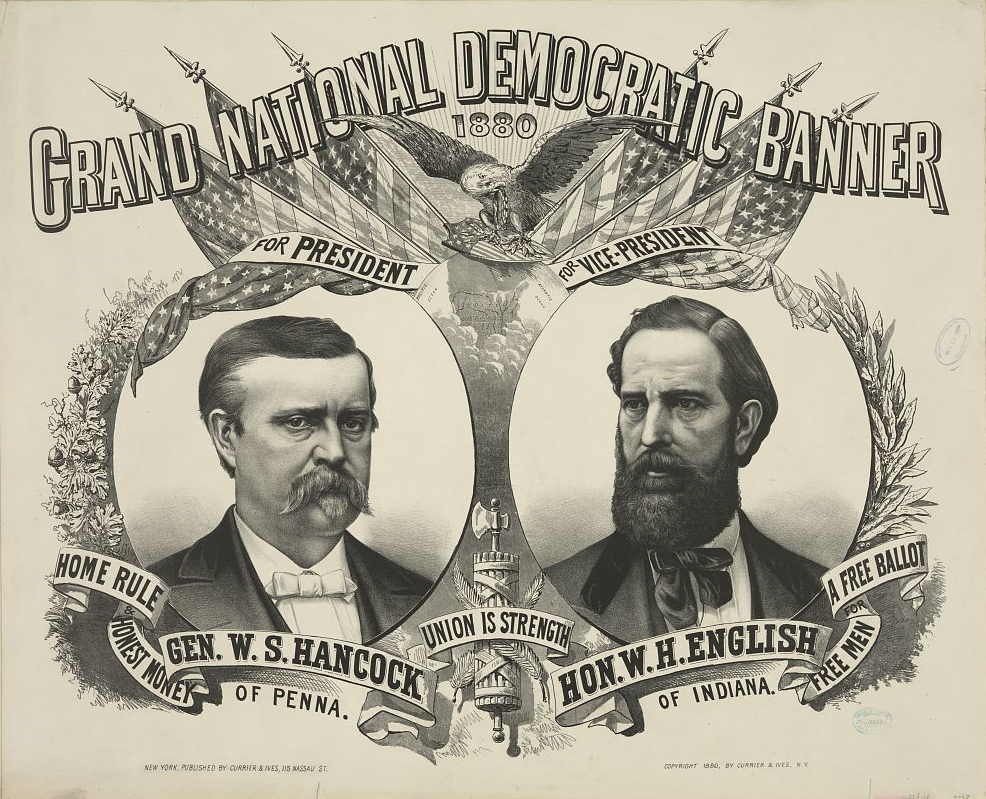
Hancock–English campaign poster

After leaving the House of Representatives, English remained in touch with local politics, and served as chairman of the Indiana Democratic Party. His son had been elected to the state house in 1879, and the elder English was still consulted on political matters. Although he had not sought elected office since 1858, he had raised his national profile in 1879 through several interviews and letters to friendly newspapers. English attended the 1880 Democratic National Convention in Cincinnati as a member of the Indiana delegation, where he favored presidential candidate Thomas F. Bayard of Delaware, whom he admired for his support of the gold standard. The first ballot was inconclusive, with Bayard in second place. Major General Winfield Scott Hancock of Pennsylvania led the voting, and on the second ballot was nominated for President.

The Indiana delegation held back their votes from Hancock until the crucial moment, and as a reward, the delegates unanimously selected English for the vice-presidential nomination. He was not expected to add much to the ticket outside of Indiana, but the party leaders thought his popularity in that swing state would help Hancock against James A. Garfield and Chester A. Arthur, the Republican nominees. The Republicans believed that the real reason for English's nomination was his willingness to use his personal fortune to finance the campaign, as Democratic campaign coffers were low. English gave a brief speech accepting the nomination, then replied more formally in a letter a month later. In that letter, English called the disputes of the Civil War settled, and promised a "sound currency, of honest money", the restriction of Chinese immigration, and a "rigid economy in public expenditure". He characterized the election as one between

the people endeavoring to regain the political power which rightfully belongs to them, and to restore the pure, simple, economical, constitutional government of our fathers on the one side, and a hundred thousand federal office-holders and their backers, pampered with place and power, and determined to retain them at all hazards, on the other.

Hancock and the Democrats expected to carry the Solid South, which, with the disenfranchisement of black Southerners following the end of Reconstruction, was dominated electorally by white Democrats. In addition to the South, the ticket needed to add New York and a few of the Midwestern states to their total to win the election; national elections in that era were largely decided by closely divided states there. The practical differences between the parties were few, and the Republicans were reluctant to attack Hancock personally because of his heroic reputation. The one policy difference the Republicans were able to exploit was a statement in the Democratic platform endorsing "a tariff for revenue only". Garfield's campaign used this statement to paint the Democrats as unsympathetic to the plight of industrial laborers, who benefited from the high protective tariff then in place. The tariff issue cut Democratic support in industrialized Northern states, which were essential in establishing a Democratic majority.

The October state elections in Ohio and Indiana resulted in Republican victories there, discouraging Democrats about the federal election to come the following month. There was even some talk among party leaders of dropping English from the ticket, but English convinced them that the October losses owed more to local issues, and that the Democratic ticket could still carry Indiana, if not Ohio, in November. In the end, English was proven wrong: the Democrats and Hancock failed to carry any of the Midwestern states they had targeted, including Indiana. Hancock and English lost the popular vote by just 7,018. The electoral vote, however, had a much larger spread: 214 for Garfield and Arthur, compared to 155 for Hancock and English.

== Post-election career ==
English resumed his business career after the election. He also became more interested in local history, joining a reunion of the survivors of the 1850 state constitutional convention, which met at his opera house in 1885. He became the president of the Indiana Historical Society and wrote two volumes, which were published at his death: Conquest of the Country Northwest of the River Ohio, 1778–1783; and Life of General George Rogers Clark. He served on the Indianapolis Monument Commission in 1893, and helped to plan and finance the Soldiers' and Sailors' Monument there.

== Death and legacy ==
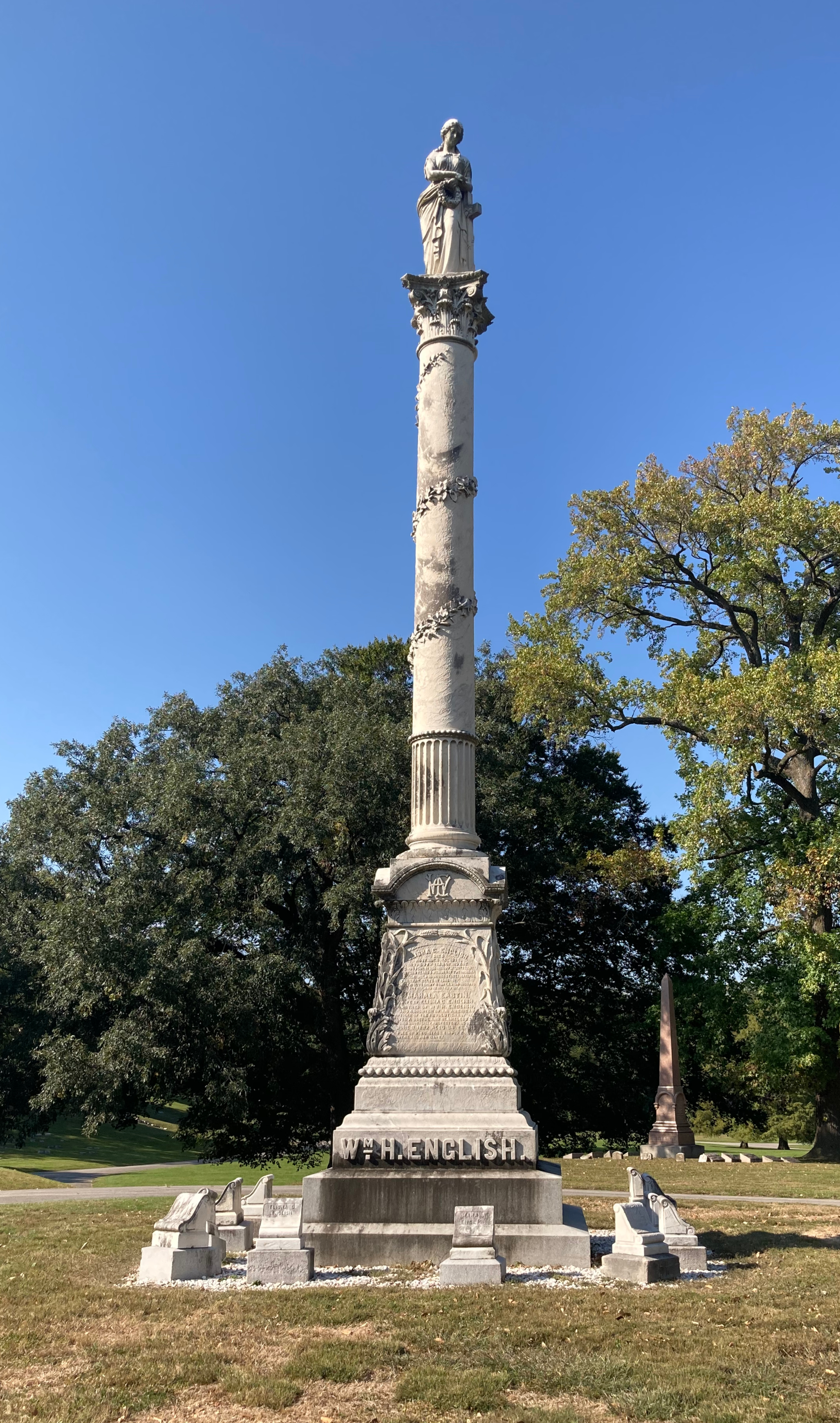
English's grave at Crown Hill Cemetery

He died at his home in Indianapolis on February 7, 1896. English was interred in Crown Hill Cemetery with his wife, who had died in 1877. Although many of the buildings he constructed have been demolished, English, Indiana, the county seat of Crawford County, is named after him, as is English Avenue in Indianapolis. Identical statues of English stand in front of the Scott County Courthouse in Scottsburg, Indiana, and at the Crawford County Fairgrounds in English. His son William served in Congress from 1884 to 1885. His grandson, William English Walling, the son of his daughter Rosalind, was a co-founder of the National Association for the Advancement of Colored People. An extensive collection of English's personal and family papers is housed at the Indiana Historical Society in Indianapolis, where it is open for research.

== Notes ==
U.S. House of Representatives
Preceded by Cyrus L. Dunham	Member of the U.S. House of Representatives from Indiana's 2nd congressional district 1853–1861	Succeeded by James A. Cravens
Party political offices
Preceded by Thomas A. Hendricks	Democratic nominee for Vice President of the United States; 1880	Succeeded by Thomas A. Hendricks
