= 1880 United States presidential election in Rhode Island =

- November 2, 1880
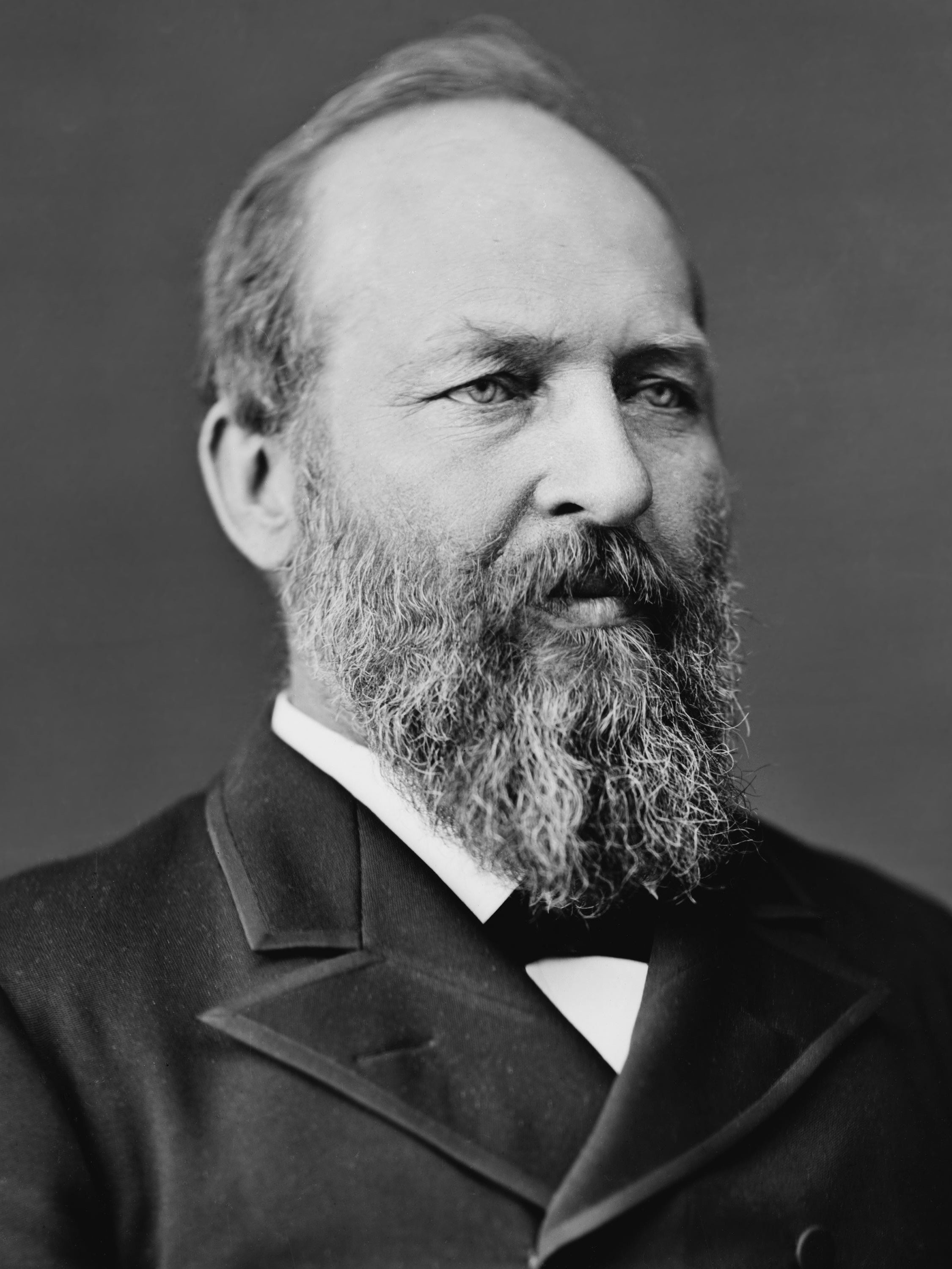

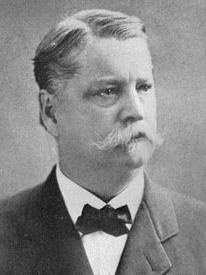
Nominee	James A. Garfield	Winfield Scott Hancock
Party	Republican	Democratic
Home state	Ohio	Pennsylvania
Running mate	Chester A. Arthur	William Hayden English
Electoral vote	4	0
Popular vote	18,195	10,779
Percentage	62.24%	36.87%

Garfield
50–60%
60–70%
70–80%
80–90%
Hancock
50–60%
60–70%
President before election
Rutherford B. Hayes
Republican
Elected President
James A. Garfield
Republican

The 1880 United States presidential election in Rhode Island took place on November 2, 1880, as part of the 1880 United States presidential election. Voters chose four representatives, or electors to the Electoral College, who voted for president and vice president.

Rhode Island voted for the Republican nominee, James A. Garfield, over the Democratic nominee, Winfield Scott Hancock. Garfield won the state by a margin of 25.37%.

With 62.24% of the popular vote, Rhode Island would be Garfield's fourth strongest victory in terms of percentage in the popular vote after Vermont, Nebraska and Minnesota.

This was the last time until 1964 that a Democrat won the town of North Kingstown.

== Results ==
1880 United States presidential election in Rhode Island
Party	Candidate	Running mate	Popular vote		Electoral vote	
Party	Candidate	Running mate	Count	%	Count	%
Republican	James Abram Garfield of Ohio	Chester Alan Arthur of New York	18,195	62.24%	4	100.00%
Democratic	Winfield Scott Hancock of Pennsylvania	William Hayden English of Indiana	10,779	36.87%	0	0.00%
Greenback	James Baird Weaver of Iowa	Barzillai Jefferson Chambers of Texas	236	0.81%	0	0.00%
Prohibition	Neal Dow of Maine	Henry Adams Thompson of Ohio	20	0.07%	0	0.00%
Anti-Masonic	John Wolcott Phelps of Vermont	Samuel Clarke Pomeroy of Kansas	4	0.01%	0	0.00%
N/A	Others	Others	1	0.01%	0	0.00%
Total			29,235	100.00%	4	100.00%

== See also ==
- United States presidential elections in Rhode Island
