= 1880 United States presidential election =

Election of James A. Garfield

- November 2, 1880

369 members of the Electoral College 185 electoral votes needed to win
- Turnout: 79.4% (▼3.2 pp)
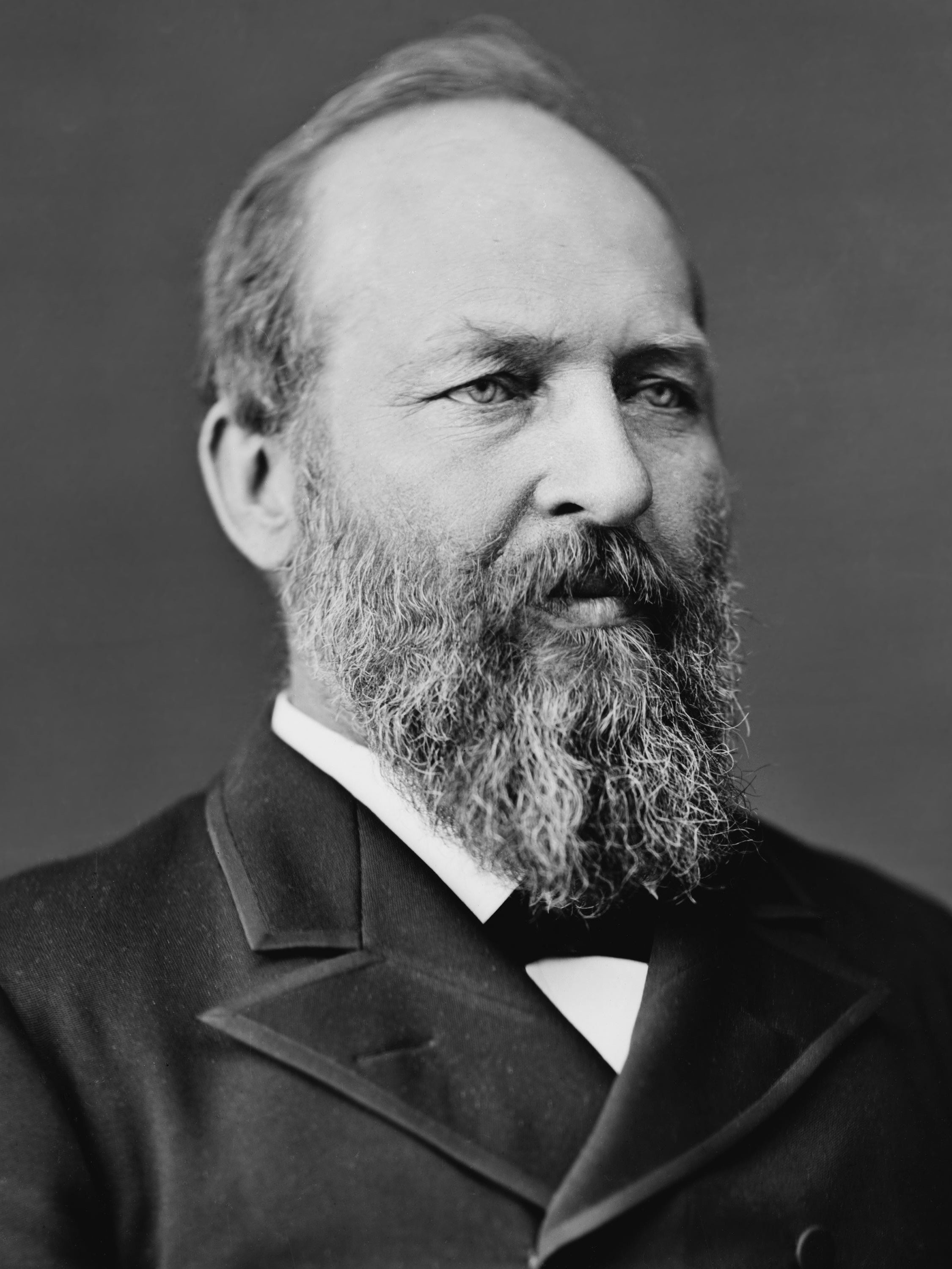

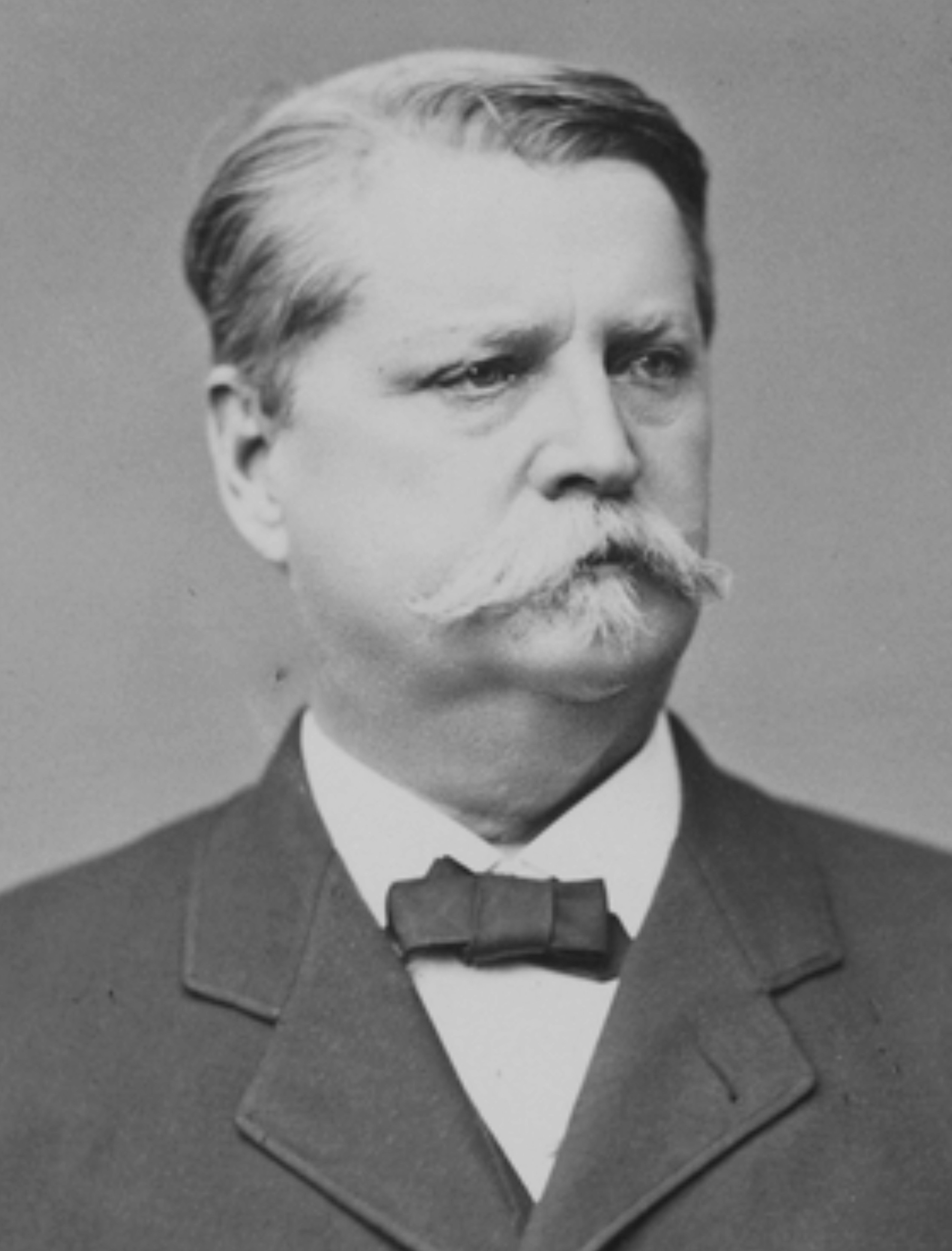
Nominee	James A. Garfield	Winfield Scott Hancock
Party	Republican	Democratic
Home state	Ohio	Pennsylvania
Running mate	Chester A. Arthur	William Hayden English
Electoral vote	214	155
States carried	19	19
Popular vote	4,446,158	4,444,260
Percentage	48.32%	48.21%
- Presidential election results map. Red denotes those won by Garfield/Arthur, blue denotes states won by Hancock/English. Numbers indicate the number of electoral votes allotted to each state.
President before election
Rutherford B. Hayes
Republican
Elected President
James A. Garfield
Republican

A presidential election was held in the United States on November 2, 1880. The Republican ticket of Representative James A. Garfield of Ohio and New York Republican Party chairman Chester A. Arthur defeated the Democratic ticket of major general Winfield Scott Hancock of Pennsylvania and former Representative William Hayden English of Indiana.

Incumbent President Rutherford B. Hayes did not seek reelection. After the longest convention in the party's history, the factionalized Republicans chose Representative Garfield of Ohio as their standard-bearer. The Democratic Party chose Major General Winfield Scott Hancock of Pennsylvania as their nominee. The dominance of the two major parties began to fray as an upstart left-wing party, the Greenback Party, nominated another Civil War general for president, Iowa Congressman James B. Weaver. In a campaign fought mainly over issues of Civil War loyalties, tariffs, and Chinese immigration, Garfield narrowly won both the electoral and popular vote. He and Hancock each took just over 48 percent of the popular vote, while Weaver and two other minor candidates, Neal Dow and John W. Phelps, together made up the remainder.

In the end, the popular vote totals of the two main candidates were separated by 1,898 votes (0.11%), the smallest victory in the national popular vote ever recorded in terms of both raw votes and percentage. In the electoral college, however, Garfield's victory was much larger; he won the tipping point state of New York by 21,033 votes (1.91%). Hancock's sweep of the Southern states was not enough for victory, but it cemented his party's dominance of the region for generations.

This was the first election in which people in every state were able to vote directly for presidential electors, (Note: In 1876, Colorado appointed electors by state legislature due to insufficient time to organize an election. From 1864–1872, some states did not choose electors due to the Civil War or Reconstruction. Before then, some states gave the choice of electors to the state legislature, including South Carolina which used the system up through 1860.) and the voter turnout rate was one of the highest in the nation's history. This was the last of six consecutive presidential election victories for the Republican Party, and the last time the outgoing president's party retained the White House in two consecutive open seat elections. Garfield was assassinated during his first year in office, and he was succeeded by his vice president, Chester A. Arthur.

== Background ==
The two major parties were the Republicans and the Democrats, and after the end of the Reconstruction Era in 1877, the national electorate was closely divided between them. Party membership was only partly based on ideology; party identification often reflected ethnic and religious background, as well as Civil War loyalties that were still keenly felt by many voters. Most Northern Protestants voted Republican, as did black Southerners. On the other hand, white Southerners and Northern Catholics generally voted Democratic. (Note: These sectarian divisions were far from absolute. For more detail, see Third party system.)

=== Issues ===
The gold standard and the tariff tax on imports divided the major parties. The monetary debate was over the basis for the value of the United States dollar. Nothing but gold and silver coin had ever been legal tender in the United States until the Civil War, when the mounting costs of the war forced the United States Congress to issue "greenbacks" (dollar bills backed by government bonds). Greenbacks helped pay for the war, but resulted in severe inflation . After the war, bondholders and other creditors (based in the North) wanted to return to a gold standard. At the same time, debtors (especially in the South and West) benefited from the way inflation reduced the real value of their debts, and workers and some businessmen liked the way inflation made for easy credit. The issue cut across parties, producing dissension among Republicans and Democrats alike and spawning a third party, the Greenback Party, in 1876, when both major parties nominated "hard money" candidates (i.e., candidates who favored the gold-backed currency instead of "soft money" greenbacks that generated inflation). Monetary debate intensified as Congress effectively demonetized silver in 1873 and began redeeming greenbacks in gold by 1879, while limiting their circulation. As the 1880 election season began, the nation's money was backed by gold alone, but the issue was far from settled.

Tariff policy was a major source of party conflict in late 19th-century and early 20th-century America. During the Civil War, Congress raised protective tariffs to new heights. This was done partly to pay for the war, but partly because high tariffs were popular in the North. A high tariff meant that foreign goods were more expensive, which made it easier for American businesses to sell goods domestically. Republicans supported high tariffs as a way to protect American jobs and increase prosperity. Democrats condemned them as a source of higher prices for goods, whereas the higher revenues that they generated for the federal government were not needed after the conclusion of the Civil War. However Northern Democrats from manufacturing districts, especially in Pennsylvania, also supported high tariffs. In the interest of party unity, the leaders of each party often sought to avoid the question as much as possible.

=== 1876 election ===
In the election of 1876, Republican Rutherford B. Hayes of Ohio defeated Democrat Samuel J. Tilden of New York in one of the most hotly contested presidential elections in the nation's history. The early results indicated a Democratic victory, but the electoral votes of several Southern states were disputed bitterly. Both parties in Congress agreed to convene a bipartisan Electoral Commission, which ultimately decided the race for Hayes.

For Democrats, the "stolen election" became a rallying cry, and the Democratic majority in the House of Representatives spent much of 1878 investigating it, although they failed to turn up any new evidence against their Republican foes. At first, Tilden was seen as the front-runner for the 1880 nomination. For leading Republicans, Hayes's inauguration in 1877 signaled the start of backroom maneuverings for the nomination in 1880. Even before his election, Hayes had pledged not to run for a second term, leaving the path to the White House open in 1880. His cabinet selections alienated many party leaders as well, deepening the growing divide within the Republican party between forces loyal to New York Senator Roscoe Conkling and those loyal to Maine Senator James G. Blaine.

== Conventions ==
The parties agreed on their respective platforms and nominees at conventions, which met in the summer before the election.

=== Republican Party nomination ===
Republican Party (United States) 1880 Republican Party ticket
James A. Garfield	Chester A. Arthur
for President	for Vice President
U.S. Representative for Ohio's 19th congressional district (1863–1880)	10th Chairman of the New York Republican Party (1879–1881)

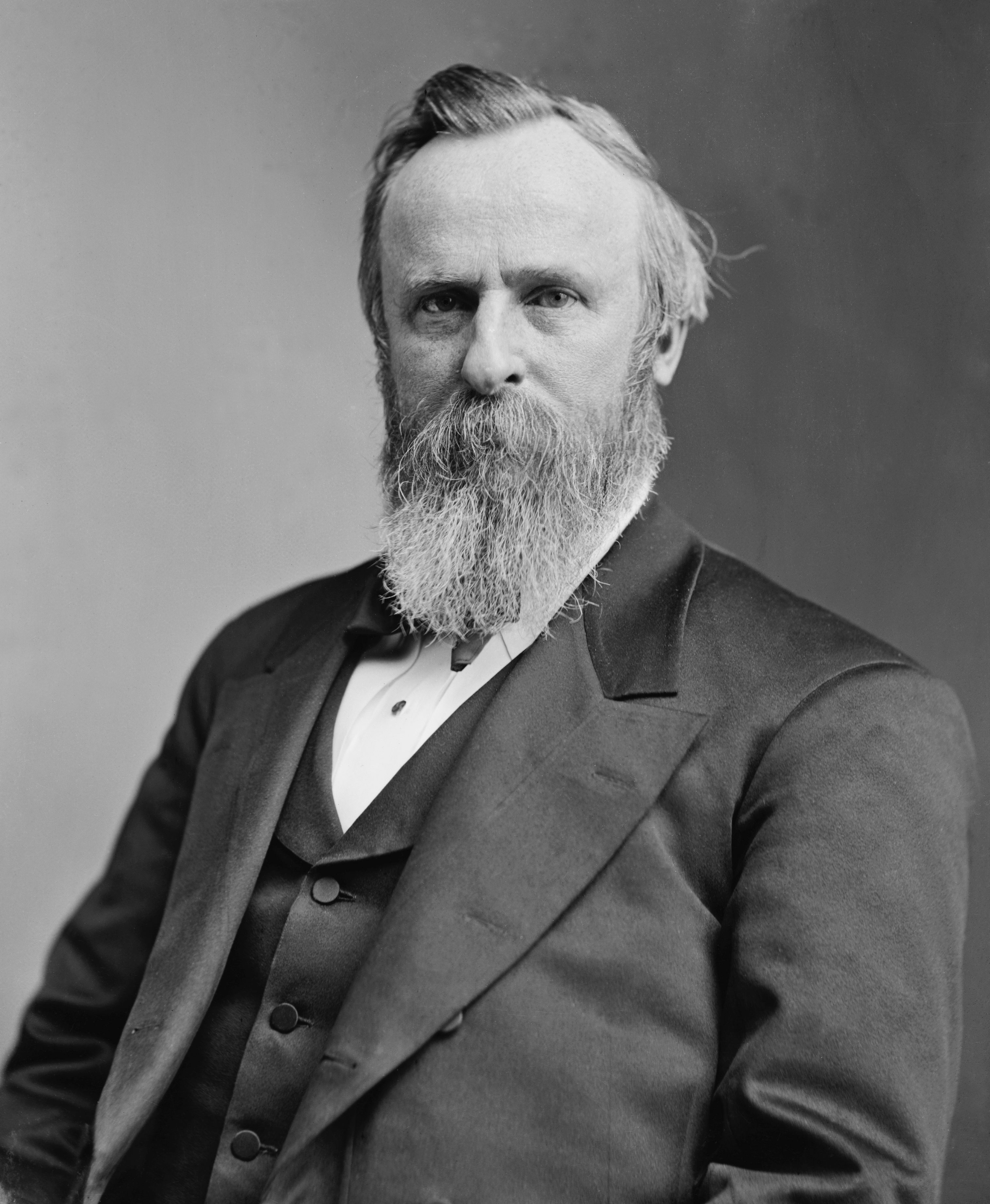
Rutherford B. Hayes, the incumbent president in 1880, whose term expired on March 4, 1881

The Republican convention met first, convening in Chicago, Illinois, on June 2. The three strongest candidates leading up to the convention were former president Ulysses S. Grant, Senator James G. Blaine and Treasury Secretary John Sherman. Grant was seeking an unprecedented third term, and was backed by Conkling's faction of the Republican Party, known as the Stalwarts. They were mainly known for their support of the spoils system and opposition to the civil service reforms sought by President Hayes. Blaine, a senator and former representative from Maine, was backed by the Half-Breed faction of the party, which supported civil service reform. Sherman, the brother of Civil War general William Tecumseh Sherman, was a former representative and senator from Ohio. He was backed by a smaller delegation that supported neither of the major factions.

With 379 votes required for nomination, on the first ballot Grant received 304, Blaine 285, and Sherman 93. Through successive ballots, none of the candidates were close to victory, so the voting continued. After the thirty-fifth ballot, Blaine and Sherman delegates switched their support to a "dark horse", Representative James A. Garfield from Ohio, who was in attendance as a Sherman supporter. On the next ballot, Garfield won the nomination with 399 votes. To placate the Grant faction, Garfield's Ohio supporters suggested Levi P. Morton for vice president. Morton declined, based on Conkling's advice. They next offered the nomination to Chester A. Arthur, another New York Stalwart. Conkling also advised him to decline, but he accepted. He was nominated, and the longest-ever Republican National Convention adjourned on June 8, 1880.

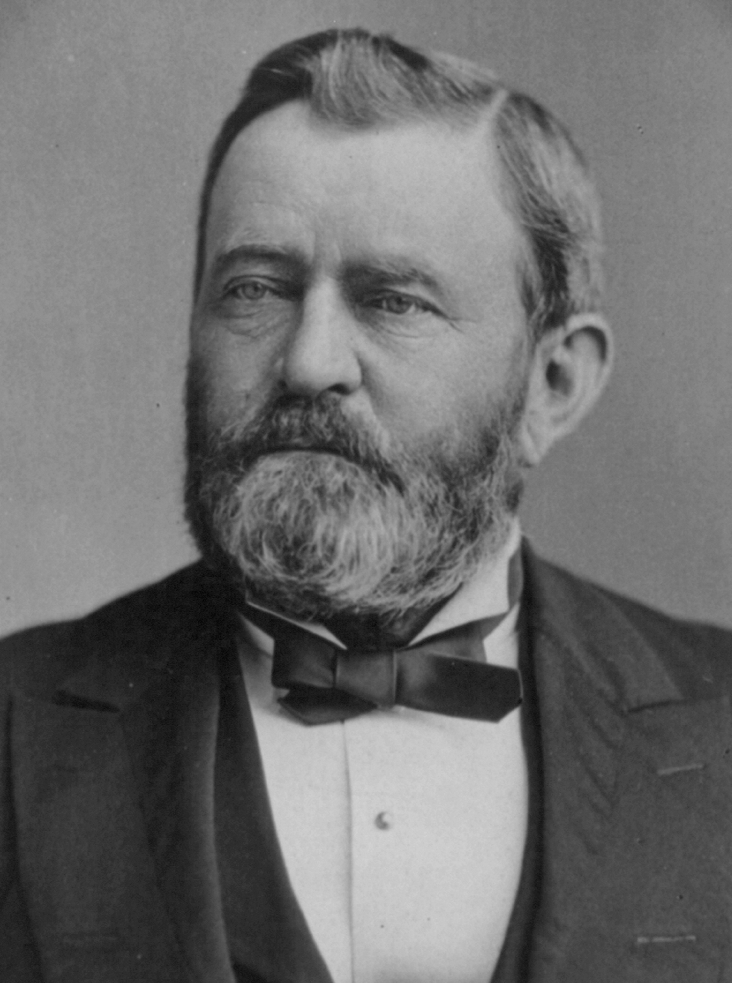
Ulysses S. Grant (President of the United States 1869–1877)

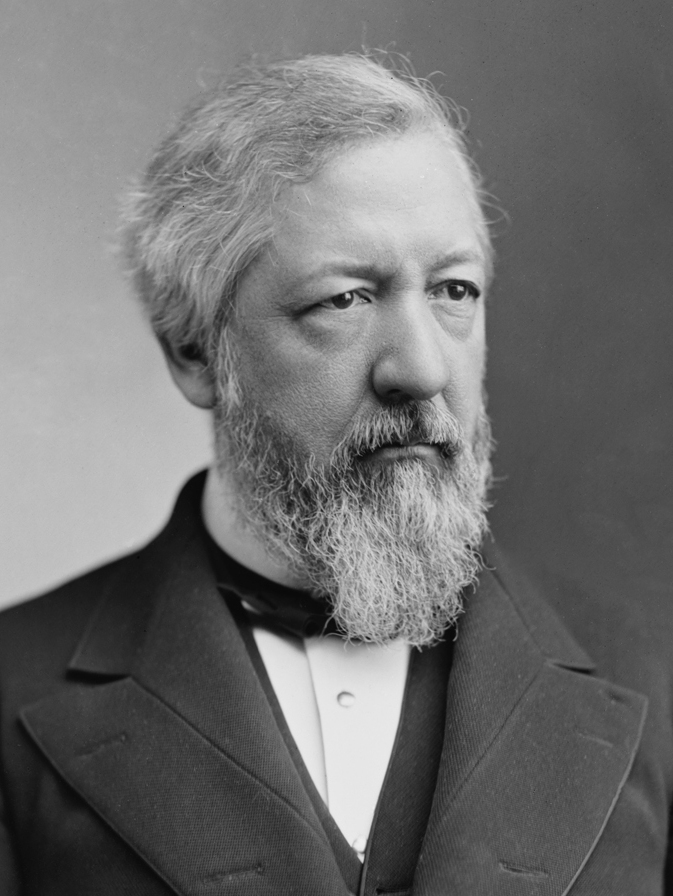
James G. Blaine (Senator from Maine)

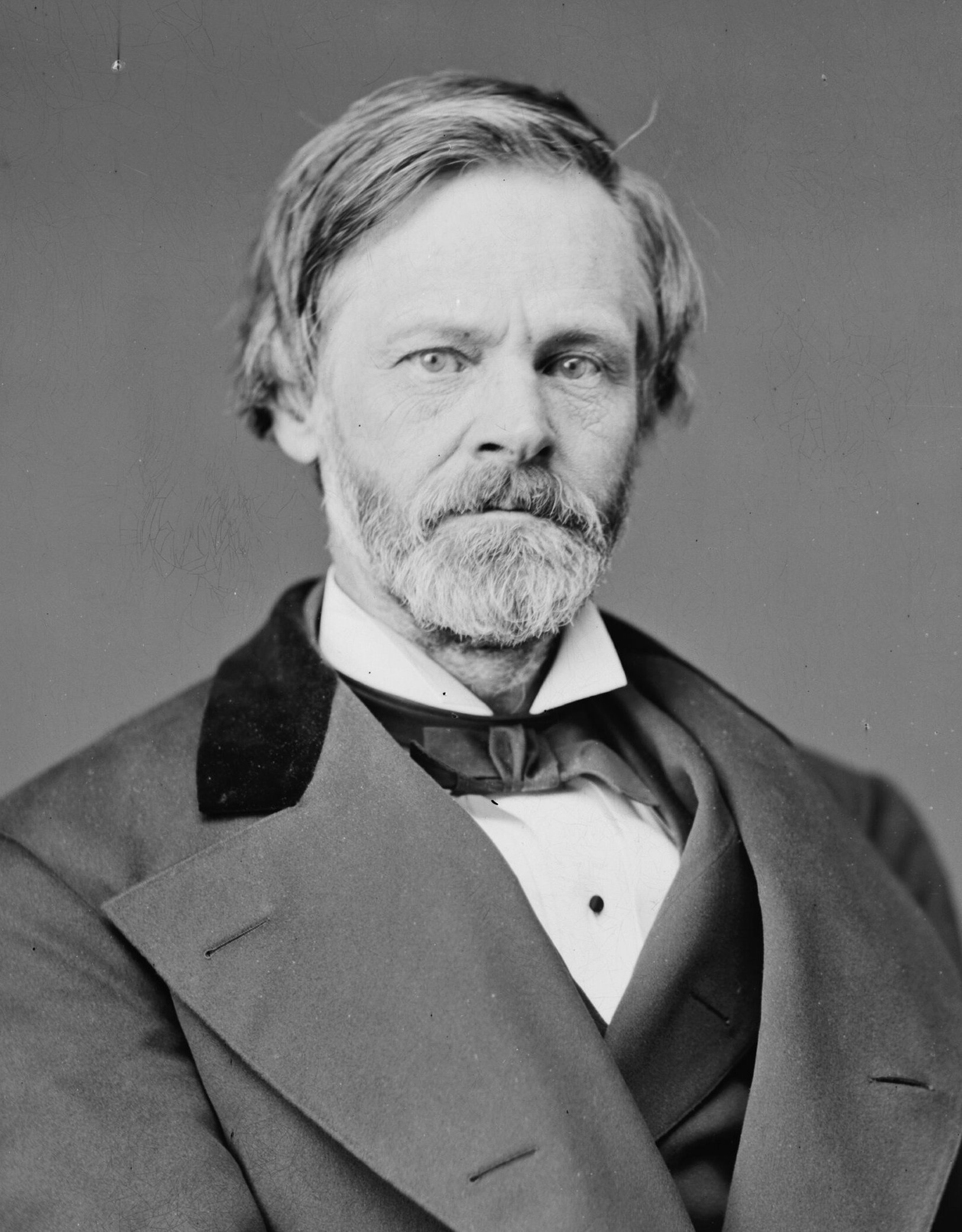
John Sherman (Secretary of the Treasury)

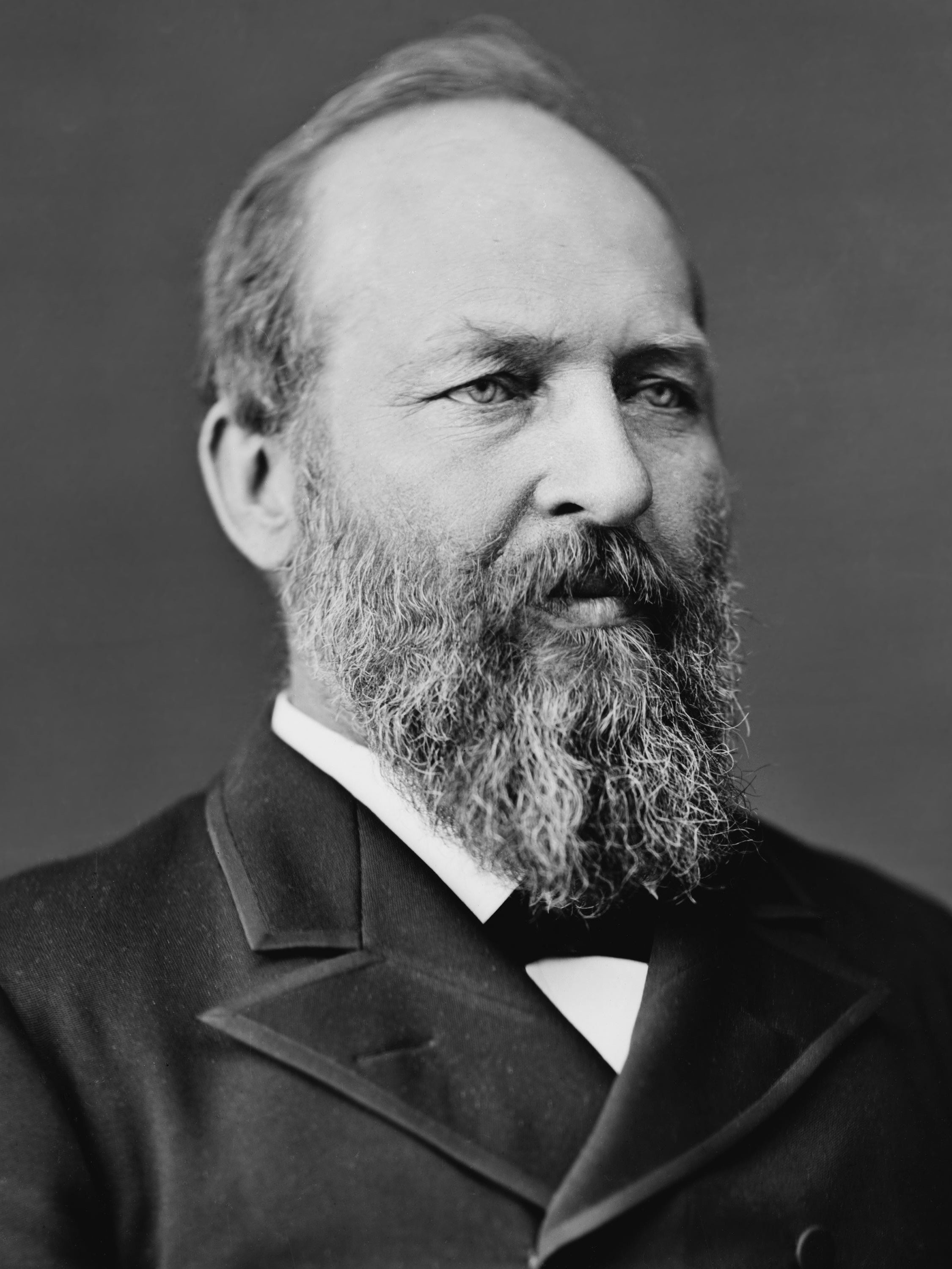
James A. Garfield (U.S. representative from Ohio)

=== Democratic Party nomination ===
Democratic Party (United States) 1880 Democratic Party ticket
Winfield Scott Hancock	William Hayden English
for President	for Vice President
Major general of the U.S. Army (1844–1886)	U.S. Representative for Indiana's 2nd congressional district (1853–1861)
Campaign

Later that month, the Democrats held their convention in Cincinnati, Ohio. Six men were officially candidates, and several others also received votes. The leading candidates were Major General Winfield Scott Hancock from Pennsylvania and Senator Thomas F. Bayard from Delaware. Tilden was not officially a candidate, but wielded heavy influence over the convention. However, he was ambiguous about his willingness to participate in another campaign, leading some supporters to defect.

While Hancock and Bayard were the leading candidates, some delegates backed men they saw as Tilden surrogates, including Henry B. Payne from Ohio, an attorney and former congressman, and Samuel J. Randall from Pennsylvania, the Speaker of the United States House of Representatives. The first ballot was inconclusive, with Hancock and Bayard leading the count, but neither close to winning. Before the second round, Tilden's withdrawal became known for certain; delegates then shifted to Hancock, who was nominated. William Hayden English, a conservative politician and businessman from the swing state of Indiana, was nominated for vice president.

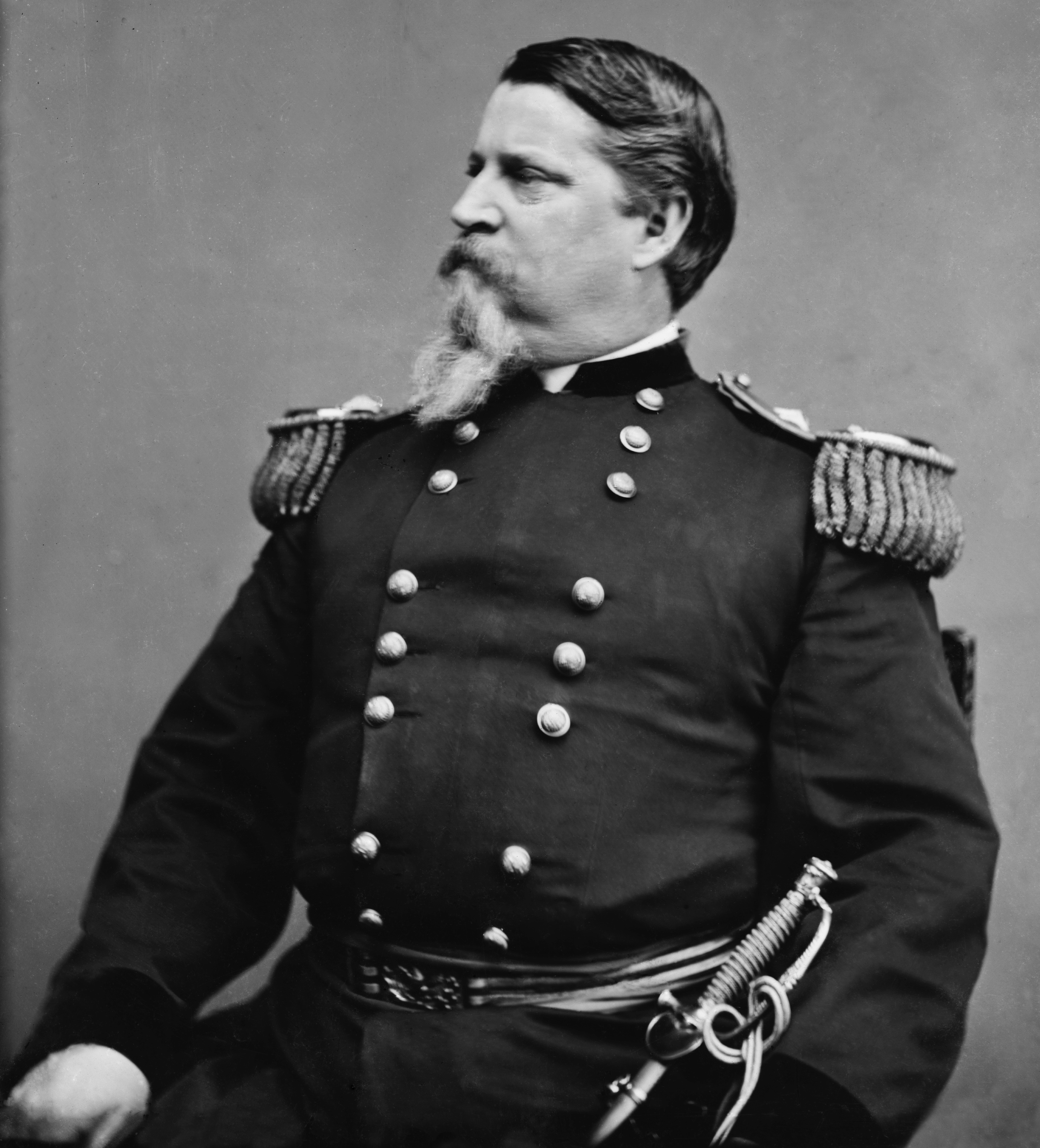
Winfield Scott Hancock (U.S. Major General)

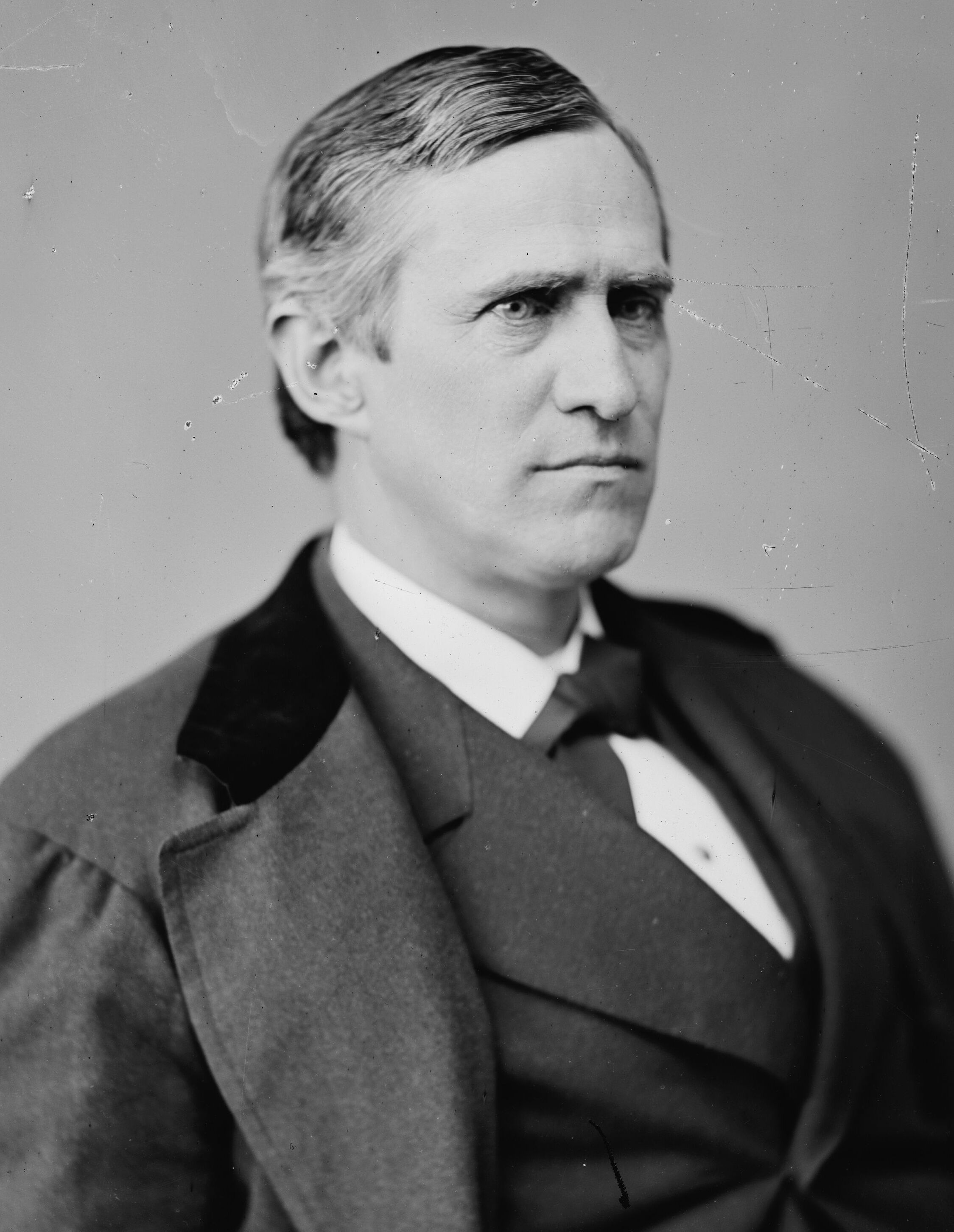
Thomas F. Bayard (U.S. senator from Delaware)

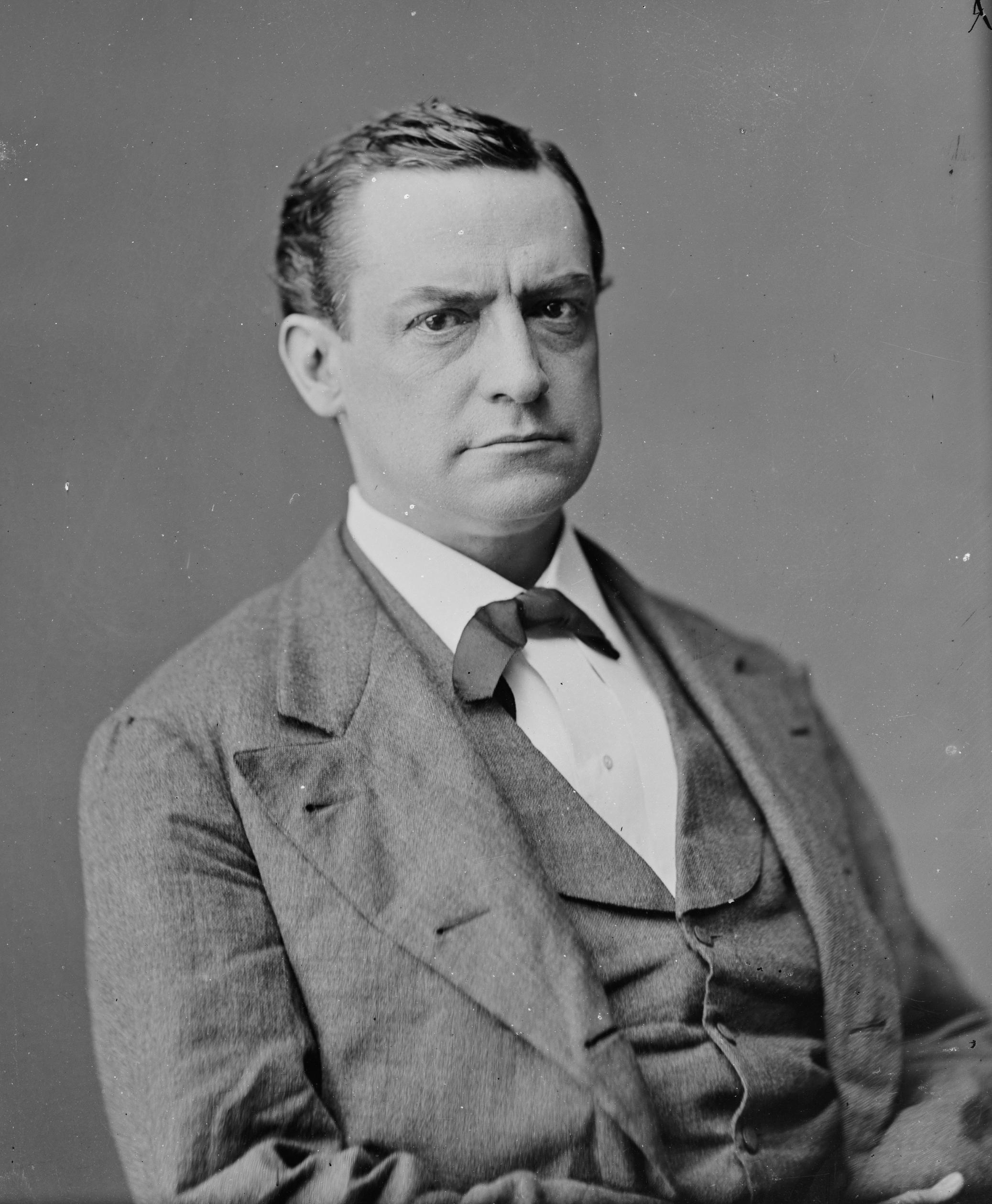
Samuel J. Randall (Speaker of the house of Representatives and Leader of the House Democratic Caucus)

=== Minor parties ===
The Greenback Party convention gathered in Chicago in mid-June, using the hall recently vacated by the Republicans. The party was a newcomer to the political scene in 1880, having arisen as a response to the economic depression that followed the Panic of 1873, mostly in the nation's West and South. During the Civil War, Congress had authorized "greenbacks", a form of money redeemable in government bonds, rather than in gold, as was traditional. After the war, many Democrats and Republicans in the East sought to return to the gold standard, and the government began to withdraw greenbacks from circulation. The reduction of the money supply, combined with the economic depression, made life harder for debtors, farmers, and industrial laborers; the Greenback Party hoped to draw support from these groups. Beyond their support for a larger money supply, they also favored an eight-hour work day, safety regulations in factories, and an end to child labor.

Six men were candidates for the Greenback nomination. James B. Weaver, an Iowa congressman and Civil War general, was the clear favorite, but two other congressmen, Benjamin F. Butler from Massachusetts and Hendrick B. Wright from Pennsylvania, also commanded considerable followings. Weaver triumphed quickly, winning a majority of the 850 delegates' votes on the first ballot. Barzillai J. Chambers, a Texas businessman and Confederate veteran, was likewise nominated for vice president on the initial vote. More tumultuous was the fight over the platform, as delegates from disparate factions of the left-wing movement clashed over women's suffrage, Chinese immigration, and the extent to which the government should regulate working conditions.

A convention of the Prohibition Party also met that month in Cleveland, Ohio. The Prohibitionists, more of a movement than a party, focused their efforts on banning alcohol. Most party members came from pietist churches, and most were former Republicans. Only twelve states sent delegates to the convention, and the platform they agreed on was silent on most issues of the day, focusing instead on the supposed evils of alcohol. For president, the Prohibitionists nominated Neal Dow, a Civil War general from Maine. As mayor of Portland, Dow helped to pass the "Maine law", which banned the sale of alcohol in the city; it became the model for temperance laws around the country. Finally, a revived Anti-Masonic Party nominated John W. Phelps, another Civil War general, on a platform of opposition to Freemasonry. Political prognosticators gave Weaver little chance of victory, and Dow and Phelps none at all.

== Candidates ==
=== Garfield ===
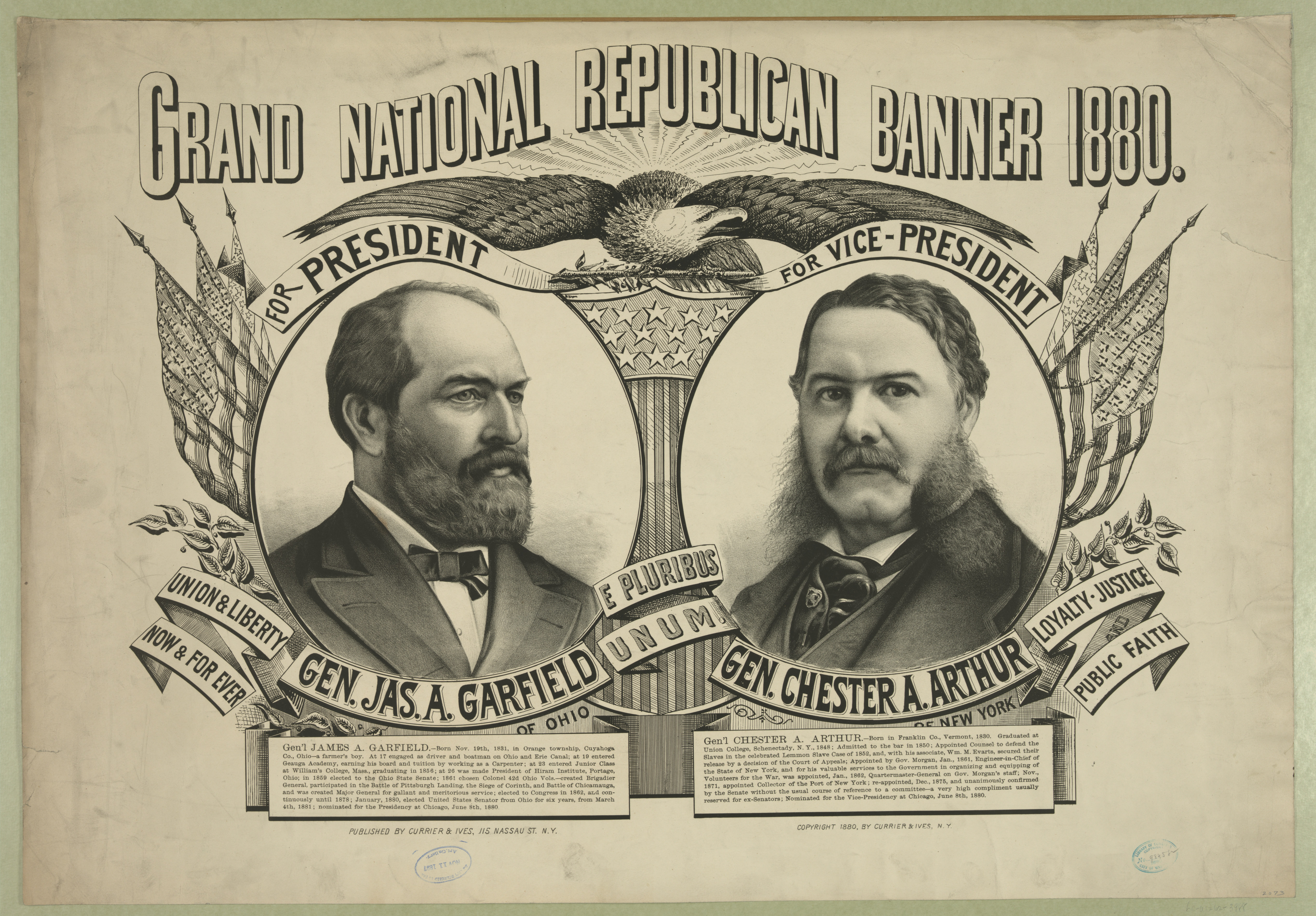
Garfield–Arthur election poster

James Abram Garfield was raised in humble circumstances on an Ohio farm by his widowed mother. He worked at various jobs, including on a canal boat, in his youth. Beginning at age 17, he studied at Williams College in Williamstown, Massachusetts, from which he graduated in 1856. A year later, Garfield entered politics as a Republican. He married Lucretia Rudolph in 1858, and served as a member of the Ohio State Senate (1859–1861). Garfield opposed Confederate secession, served as a major general in the Union Army during the Civil War, and fought in the battles of Middle Creek, Shiloh, and Chickamauga. He was first elected to Congress in 1862 to represent Ohio's 19th District. Throughout Garfield's extended congressional service after the Civil War, he firmly supported the gold standard and gained a reputation as a skilled orator. Garfield initially agreed with Radical Republican views regarding Reconstruction, but later favored a moderate approach for civil rights enforcement for freedmen.

After his nomination, Garfield met with party leaders in an attempt to heal the schism between the Stalwarts and Half-Breeds. In his formal letter to the party accepting his nomination, written with advice from party leaders, he endorsed the ideas of high tariffs and sound money, but drew particular attention to the issues of Chinese immigration and civil service reform. On both, Garfield sought a moderate path. He called for some restrictions on the former, through treaty renegotiation with the Chinese government. He straddled the divide on civil service reform, saying that he agreed with the concept, while promising to make no appointments without consulting party leaders, a position 20th-century biographer Allan Peskin called "inconsistent". As was traditional at the time, Garfield conducted a "front porch campaign", returning to his home for the duration of the contest, and leaving the actual campaigning to surrogates.

=== Hancock ===
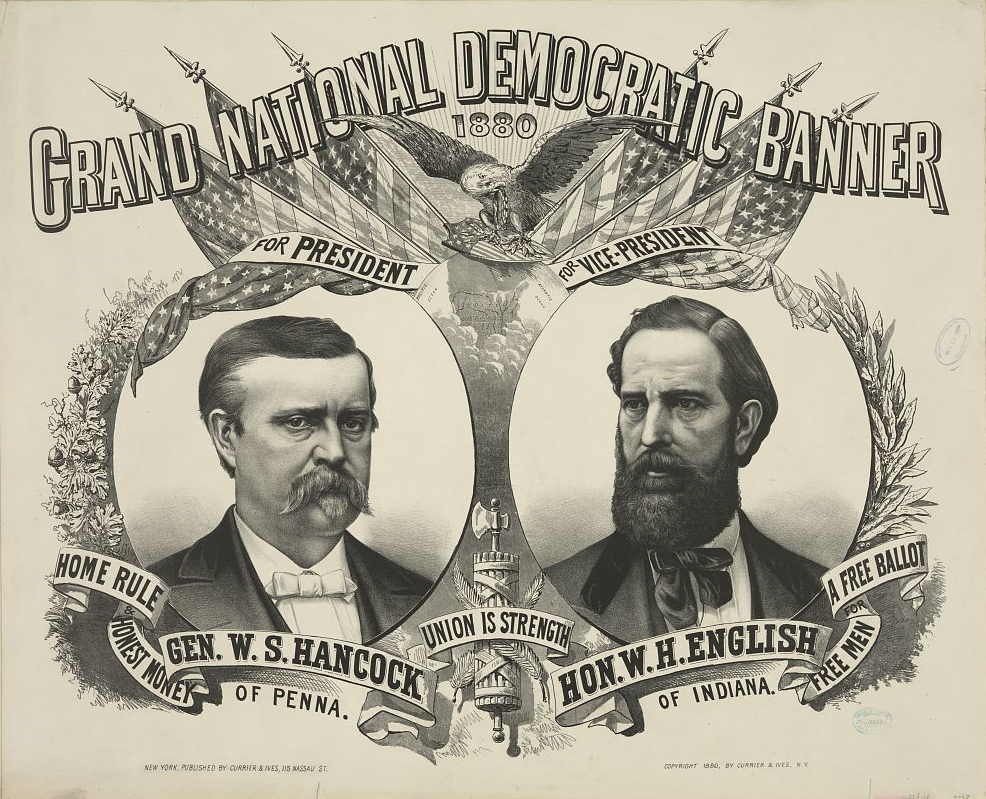
Hancock–English election poster

Winfield Scott Hancock was born and raised in Pennsylvania. He was named for General Winfield Scott, a war hero in the War of 1812 and Whig Party presidential candidate in the 1852 election. He attended the United States Military Academy at West Point and served in the Army for four decades, including service in the Mexican–American War and as a Union general in the Civil War. Known to his Army colleagues as "Hancock the Superb", he was noted in particular for his personal leadership at the Battle of Gettysburg in 1863, where he led the defense of Pickett's Charge, getting wounded in the process. His military service continued after the Civil War, as Hancock participated in the military Reconstruction of the South and the Army's presence at the Western frontier. During Reconstruction, he sided with then-President Andrew Johnson in working for a quick end to military occupation of the South and a return to government by the pre-war establishment. Hancock's reputation as a war hero at Gettysburg, combined with his status as a prominent Democrat with impeccable Unionist credentials and pro-states' rights views, made him a quadrennial presidential possibility.

Hancock was officially notified of his nomination in July, and responded with the traditional letter of acceptance. As Garfield had, the Democratic nominee sought to cause no controversy in his statement, which according to biographer David M. Jordan was "bland and general". After scorning the previous years of Republican rule, Hancock sought to tamp down fears that election of a Democrat would overturn the results of the war and Reconstruction, a common Republican campaign theme. Unlike Garfield, Hancock had no record in elected office, but the acceptance letter gave no further indication of his political preferences. Hancock remained on active duty during the campaign at his post on Governors Island in New York Harbor.

=== Weaver ===
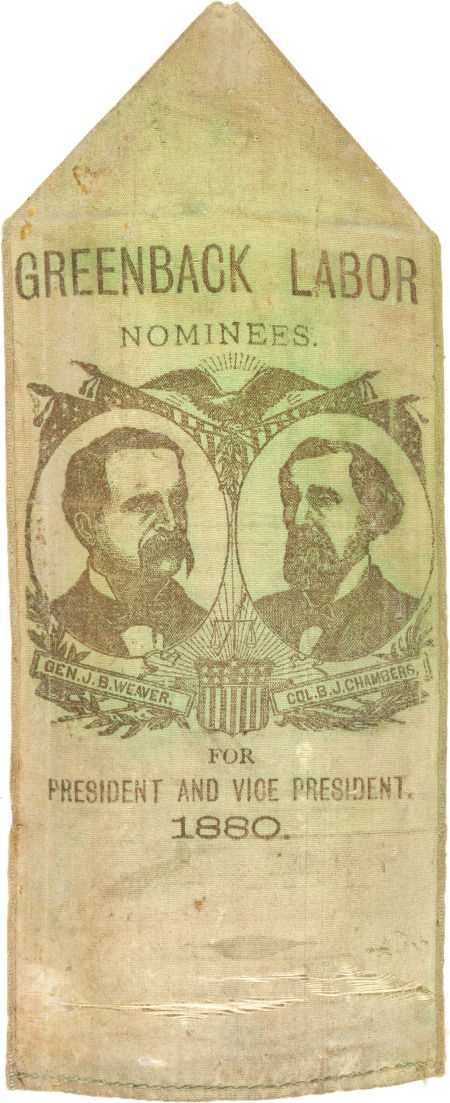
Weaver–Chambers campaign ribbon

James Baird Weaver was born in Ohio, and moved to Iowa as a boy when his family claimed a homestead on the frontier. He became politically active as a young man and was an advocate for farmers and laborers, joining and quitting several political parties in the furtherance of the progressive causes in which he believed. After serving in the Union Army in the Civil War, Weaver returned to Iowa and worked for the election of Republican candidates. After making several unsuccessful attempts at Republican nominations to various offices, and growing dissatisfied with the conservative wing of the party, in 1877 Weaver switched to the Greenback Party, advocating an increased money supply and stricter regulation of big business. As a Greenbacker with Democratic support, Weaver won election to the House of Representatives in 1878.

Unlike the major party candidates, Weaver planned to take the field himself, giving speeches around the country. His running mate, Chambers, was to do the same, until a fall from a train in July disabled him for the duration of the campaign. As the Greenbackers had the only ticket that included a Southerner, he hoped to make inroads in that region. Weaver's path to victory, already unlikely, was made more difficult by his refusal to run a fusion ticket in states where Democratic and Greenbacker strength might have combined to outvote the Republicans. His party's message of racial inclusion also presaged difficulty in the South, as the Greenbackers would face the same obstacles the Republicans did in the face of increasing black disenfranchisement.

== Campaign ==
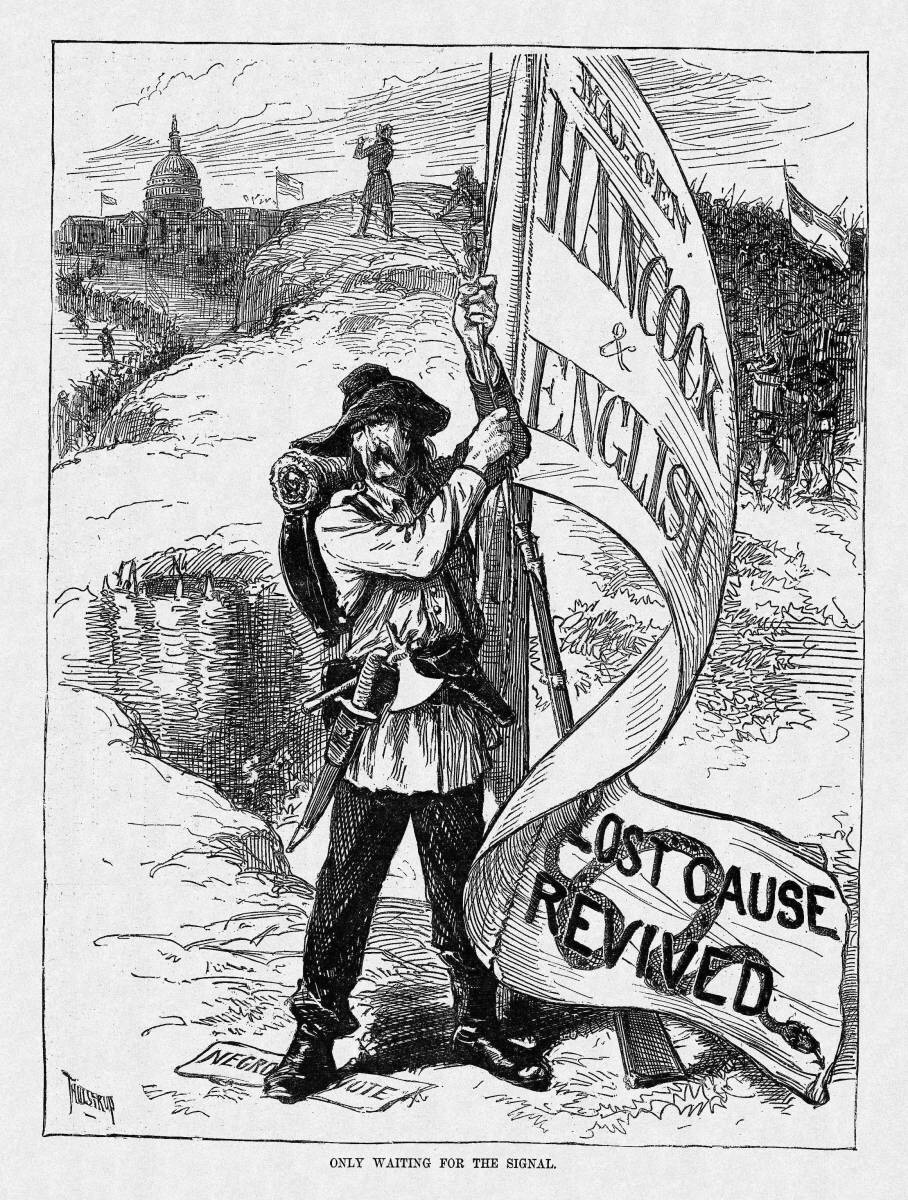
A cartoon from Harper's Weekly suggests that defeated Confederates will overturn the results of the Civil War should Hancock be elected.

=== Bloody shirt ===
Hancock and the Democrats expected to carry the Solid South, while much of the North was considered safe territory for Garfield and the Republicans; most of the campaign would involve a handful of close states, including New York and Indiana. National elections were largely decided in close elections in New York and the Midwest. Practical differences between the major party candidates were few, and Republicans began the campaign with the familiar theme of "waving the bloody shirt", reminding Northern voters that the Democratic Party was responsible for secession and four years of civil war, and that if they held power they would reverse the gains of that war, dishonor Union veterans, and pay Confederate soldiers' pensions out of the federal treasury. With fifteen years having passed since the end of the war, and Union generals at the head of all of the major and minor party tickets, the appeal to wartime loyalties was of diminishing value in exciting the voters.

"Corporations are creatures of the State, and the public safety requires that their conduct and functions shall be always controlled by their creator. They must be not only subordinated to the laws to which natural persons must bow, but they must be compelled to serve the public purposes for which they are created, and for which alone they should be permitted to live. Monopoly is bad enough in private hands, but it is a menace to all human rights when entrusted to artificial monsters uncontrolled by law and incapable of moral restraint."

— Future Democratic Congressman James G. Maguire in a speech given for Hancock

The Democrats, for their part, campaigned on the character of the candidates. They attacked Garfield for his connection with the Crédit Mobilier of America scandal of the early 1870s, in which many members of Congress were bribed by the Crédit Mobilier corporation, a railroad construction company. Garfield's precise involvement was unknown, but modern biographers agree that his account of his dealings with the construction syndicate were less than perfectly honest. Democrats used the incident as a contrast with Hancock who, as a career army officer, stood apart from Congress and lobbyists. Many in the Republican Party were reluctant to directly criticize the "hero of Gettysburg", but they did characterize Hancock as uninformed on the issues, and some of his former comrades-in-arms gave critical speeches regarding his character. Democrats never made clear what about their victory would improve the nation; Jordan later characterized their message as simply "our man is better than your man".

The Greenbackers saw the impact of Civil War loyalties more acutely as they vied for Southern votes. Weaver embarked on a speaking tour of the South in July and August. Although the local Greenback parties had seen some recent success, the national party, with an ex-Republican Union general at the head of the ticket, faced more opposition. The party's courtship of black voters, too, threatened the white Democratic establishment, leading to violent outbursts at Weaver's rallies and threats against his supporters. As Weaver campaigned in the North in September and October, Republicans accused him of purposely dividing the vote to help Democrats win a plurality in marginal states. Weaver refused to cooperate with Democrats in running fusion slates of presidential electors. However, in state-level races, Greenback candidates did often combine with Democrats to defeat Republican candidates. In the September gubernatorial race in Maine, one such fusion ticket nominated Harris M. Plaisted, who narrowly defeated the incumbent Republican in what was thought to be a safe state for that party. (Note: Several states in those days held elections for state-level offices months before the federal elections in November. Maine's, in particular, were often considered harbingers of nationwide trends.) The surprise defeat sent a shock through the Garfield campaign, and caused them to rethink their strategy of waving the bloody shirt.

=== Tariffs and immigration ===
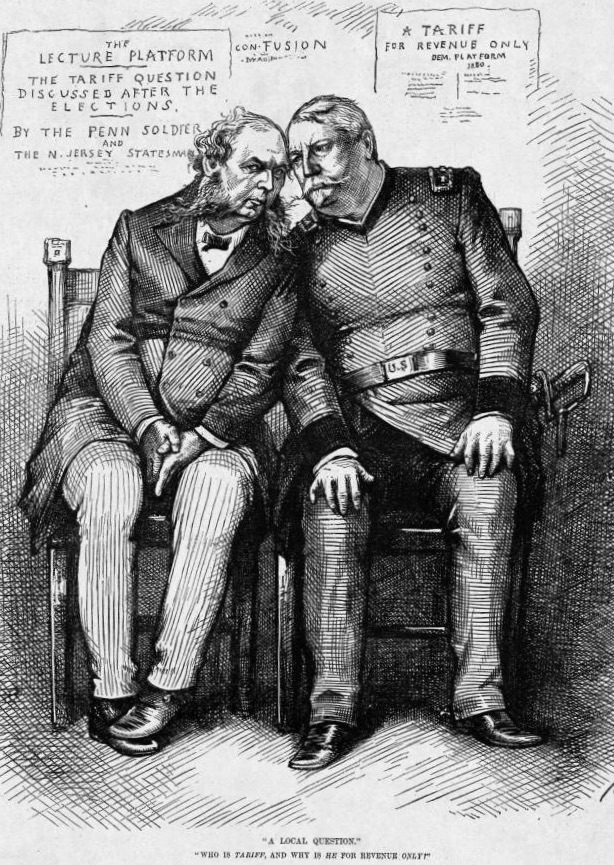
Hancock's blunder about tariffs may have harmed his standing with Northern industrial workers.

After their defeat in Maine, the Republicans began to emphasize policy differences more. One significant difference between them and the Democrats was the plank in the Democratic platform endorsing "a tariff for revenue only". That is the tariff would only be used to cover the costs of the federal government, and not be raised higher to help specific industries. Garfield's campaigners used this statement to paint the Democrats as unsympathetic to the plight of industrial laborers, a group that benefited from a high protective tariff. The tariff issue cut Democratic support in industrialized Northern states, which were essential in establishing a Democratic majority. Hancock made the situation worse when, attempting to strike a moderate stance, he said "the tariff question is a local question". While not completely inaccurate—tariff preferences often reflected local concerns—the statement was at odds with the Democrats' platform and suggested that Hancock did not understand the issue.

The change in tactics appeared to be effective, as October state elections in Ohio and Indiana resulted in Republican victories there, discouraging Democrats about their chances the following month. Democratic party leaders had selected English as Hancock's running mate because of his popularity in Indiana. With their state-level defeat there, some talked of dropping English from the ticket, but he convinced them that the October losses owed more to local issues, and that the Democratic ticket could still carry Indiana, if not Ohio, in November.

In the last weeks before the election, the issue of Chinese immigration entered the race. Both major parties (as well as the Greenbackers) pledged in their platforms to limit immigration from China, which native-born workers in the Western states believed was depressing their wages. On October 20, however, a Democratic newspaper published a letter, purportedly from Garfield to a group of businessmen, pledging to keep immigration at the current levels so that industry could keep workers' wages low. Garfield denounced the letter as a ruse, but not before one hundred thousand copies of the newspaper were mailed to California and Oregon. Once the letter was exposed as a forgery, Garfield biographer Peskin believes it may even have gained votes for the Republican in the East, but it likely weakened him in the West.

== Results ==
James A. Garfield LCCN2004670627

36.2% of the voting age population and 80.6% of eligible voters participated in the election. The extremely close election, with very high turnout, reflected the typical pattern of the Gilded Age. Democrats were assured of a Solid South electoral vote, as well as most of the border states. Republicans captured the Northeast and Midwest, winning the critical swing states of New York, Ohio, and Indiana. The Republicans captured the electoral vote 214–155, but the popular vote margin was under 2000 out of over 9 million votes cast. Republicans won the House of Representatives 147–135, but the Senate was evenly split, with the vice president casting the deciding vote.

When all the ballots were counted, fewer than 2,000 votes separated Garfield and Hancock, the closest popular vote of any American presidential election before or since. (Note: There is considerable disagreement among historians about the exact vote totals. As Kenneth Ackerman explained in his 2003 book: "Because (a) voting was decentralized, (b) states certified electoral votes, not popular votes as 'official', and (c) Democratic votes were divided among various splinter groups, there remains today a range of published 'final results' for the 1880 presidential popular vote." The federal government lists the margin of victory as 1,898, which is used in this article. Others give the margin as 7,018; 7,368; 9,070; or 9,457 among others.) The voters showed their interest in the election by turning out in record numbers; 78 percent of eligible voters cast a ballot, among largest percentages in American history. Each major party candidate earned just over 48 percent of the vote. Weaver won more than 3 percent, tripling the Greenback total of four years earlier. The other minor party candidates fared far worse, as Dow and Phelps earned 0.1 and 0.01 percent, respectively. Garfield carried the crucial state of New York by 20,000 votes out of 1.1 million cast there. Other states were much closer; Hancock's margin of victory in California was only about 144 votes.

In the electoral college, the vote was more decisive. As expected, Hancock carried the South and border states, but Garfield swept all but one of the Northern states (the exception was New Jersey, which he lost by just two thousand votes). Both candidates carried nineteen states, but Garfield's triumphs in the more populous North translated into a 214–155 electoral college victory. This is one of three times that both candidates won the same number of states, along with 1848 and 2020. The sectional divide of the vote further spurred the Republicans' retreat from the South after Reconstruction and demonstrated that they could win without competing there. Weaver's resistance to fusion had no effect on the result; the combined Democratic and Greenback vote would have carried Indiana, but not any other of the states Garfield won, and the result would still have been a Republican majority in the electoral college. Hancock was convinced that the Republicans won New York by fraud. Lacking evidence, and mindful of the turmoil caused by the disputed election four years earlier, the Democrats did not pursue the matter.

California voted for a losing Democrat for the first time ever, which would not occur again until 2000. Republicans would not win without New Jersey and Delaware until 2000. Nevada also voted for a losing Democrat for the first time. Furthermore, this is the only time since the admission of California that a candidate has won nationally without winning either California or Texas.

15.12% of Garfield's votes came from the eleven states of the former Confederacy, with him taking 37.47% of the vote in that region.

=== Black voters ===
According to Professor J. Morgan Kousser, a majority of Black men voted in 9 of the 11 Southern states in the 1880 presidential election. In only two states it was under 50% --Georgia with 39% of Blacks voting and Mississippi with 34%. In Arkansas, Florida, Louisiana, North Carolina, Tennessee, and Texas, Black turnout was higher than white turnout. Turnout was the same in Alabama and Virginia.

=== Irregularities ===
In Virginia, a split in the Democratic Party over the payment of state debts led to two Democratic electoral slates being nominated, one by the regular debt-paying "Funder" Democrats, the other by the "Readjuster" or anti-debt paying faction of the party. Both slates were pledged to the Hancock ticket. Republicans initially hoped the split could lead Garfield to win the state, but the results were otherwise. The Readjuster ticket received 31,527 votes, but the Funder Democrats took 96,449 votes, enough to defeat the Republicans, whose slate had 84,020.

Although Hancock won Georgia's popular vote easily, there was an irregularity in that state's electoral votes. According to Article II, Section 1, clause 3 of the Constitution, "The Congress may determine the Time of choosing the Electors, and the Day on which they shall give their Votes; which Day shall be the same throughout the United States." In 1792, Congress had set the date for the Electoral College to vote on the first Wednesday in December, which in 1880 fell on December 1. However, Georgia's electors failed to cast their ballots on December 1, instead voting on the following Wednesday, December 8. Congress chose to count Georgia's vote in the official tally anyway; had they not done so, Hancock's electoral vote would have been 144, not 155.

At the time, voters in California voted for individual electors, with the top six candidates being elected. One of the electors on the Democratic ticket was David S. Terry, a controversial figure in California politics due to his killing of David C. Broderick in a duel in 1859. As a result, about five hundred Democratic voters scratched Terry's name off of their ballots. Due to the closeness of the election, these lost votes caused Terry to receive fewer votes than the entire Republican ticket and thus a single Republican elector won the sixth-most votes to claim the last elector position. This was the first occasion in which California's electoral vote was split, rather than being awarded to a single candidate. This would subsequently occur in California three additional times in 1892, 1896, and 1912.

=== Detailed results ===

Electoral results
Presidential candidate	Party	Home state	Popular vote		Electoral vote	Running mate		
Presidential candidate	Party	Home state	Count	Percentage	Electoral vote	Vice-presidential candidate	Home state	Electoral vote
James A. Garfield	Republican	Ohio	4,454,443	48.32%	214	Chester A. Arthur	New York	214
Winfield Scott Hancock	Democratic	Pennsylvania	4,444,976	48.21%	155	William Hayden English	Indiana	155
James B. Weaver	Greenback	Iowa	308,649	3.35%	0	Barzillai J. Chambers	Texas	0
Neal Dow	Prohibition	Maine	10,364	0.11%	0	Henry Adams Thompson	Ohio	0
John W. Phelps	Anti-Masonic	Vermont	1,045	0.01%	0	Samuel C. Pomeroy	Kansas	0
Total			9,219,477	100%	369			369
Needed to win					185			185

Popular vote
Garfield	48.32%
Hancock	48.21%
Weaver	3.35%
Others	0.12%

Electoral vote
Garfield	57.99%
Hancock	42.01%

=== Geography of results ===
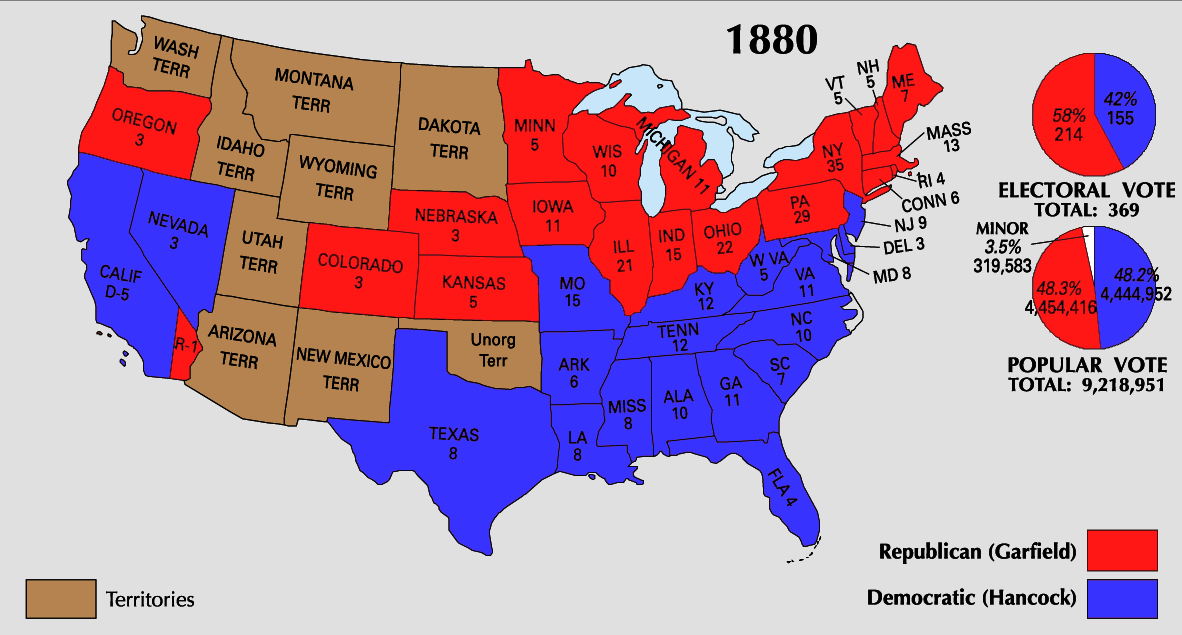

Results by county, shaded according to winning candidate's percentage of the vote

=== Cartographic gallery ===
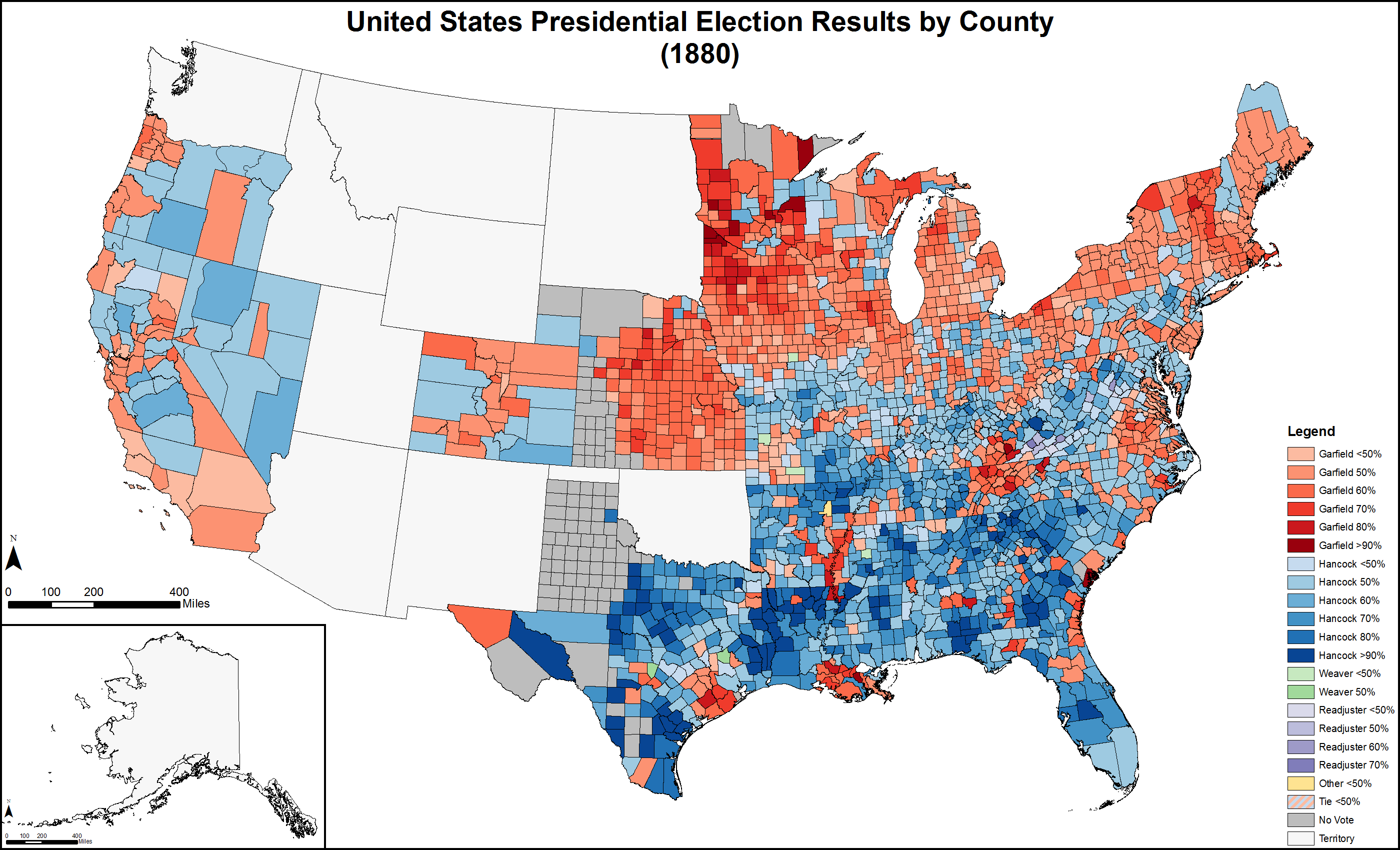
Map of presidential election results by county

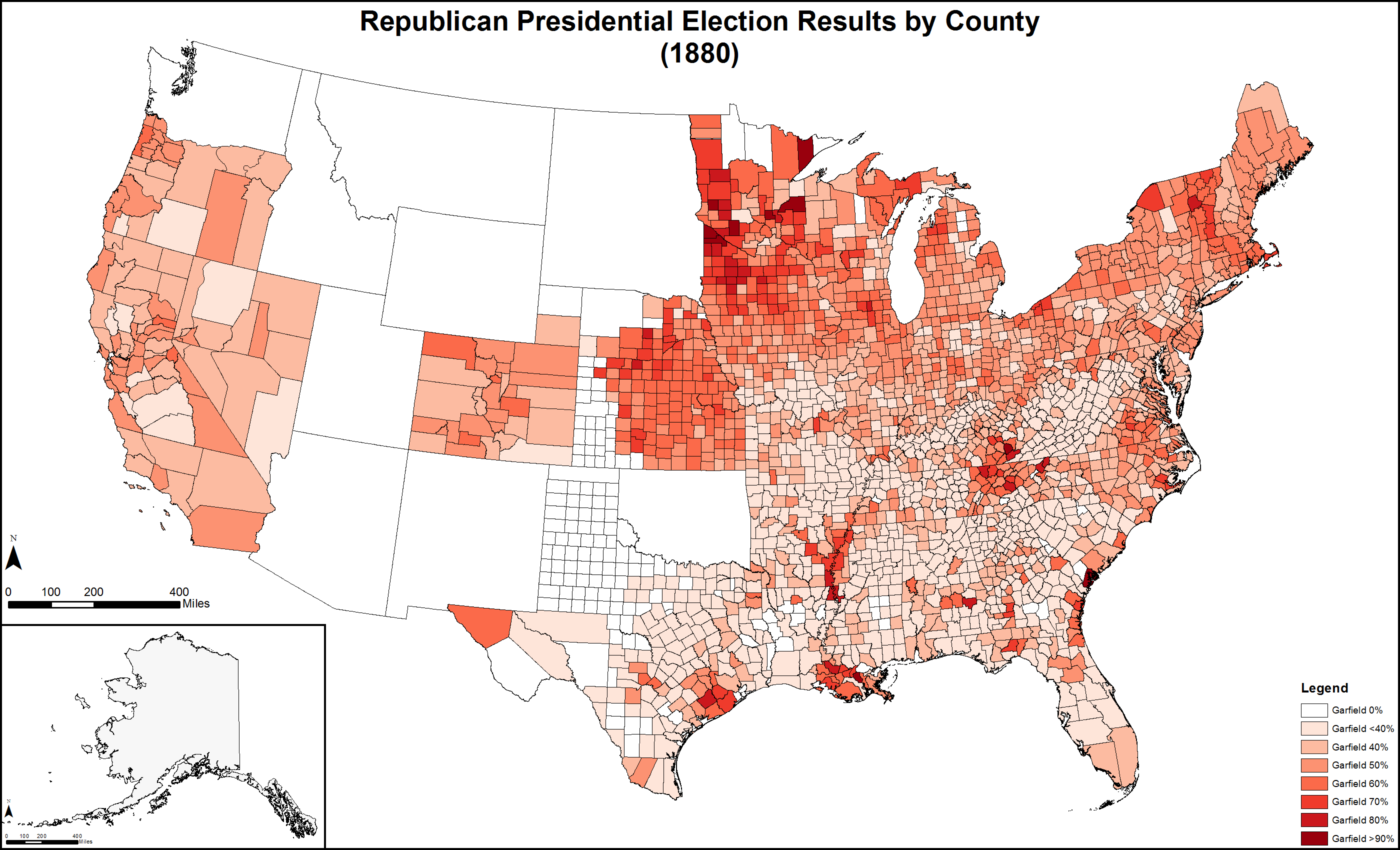
Map of Republican presidential election results by county

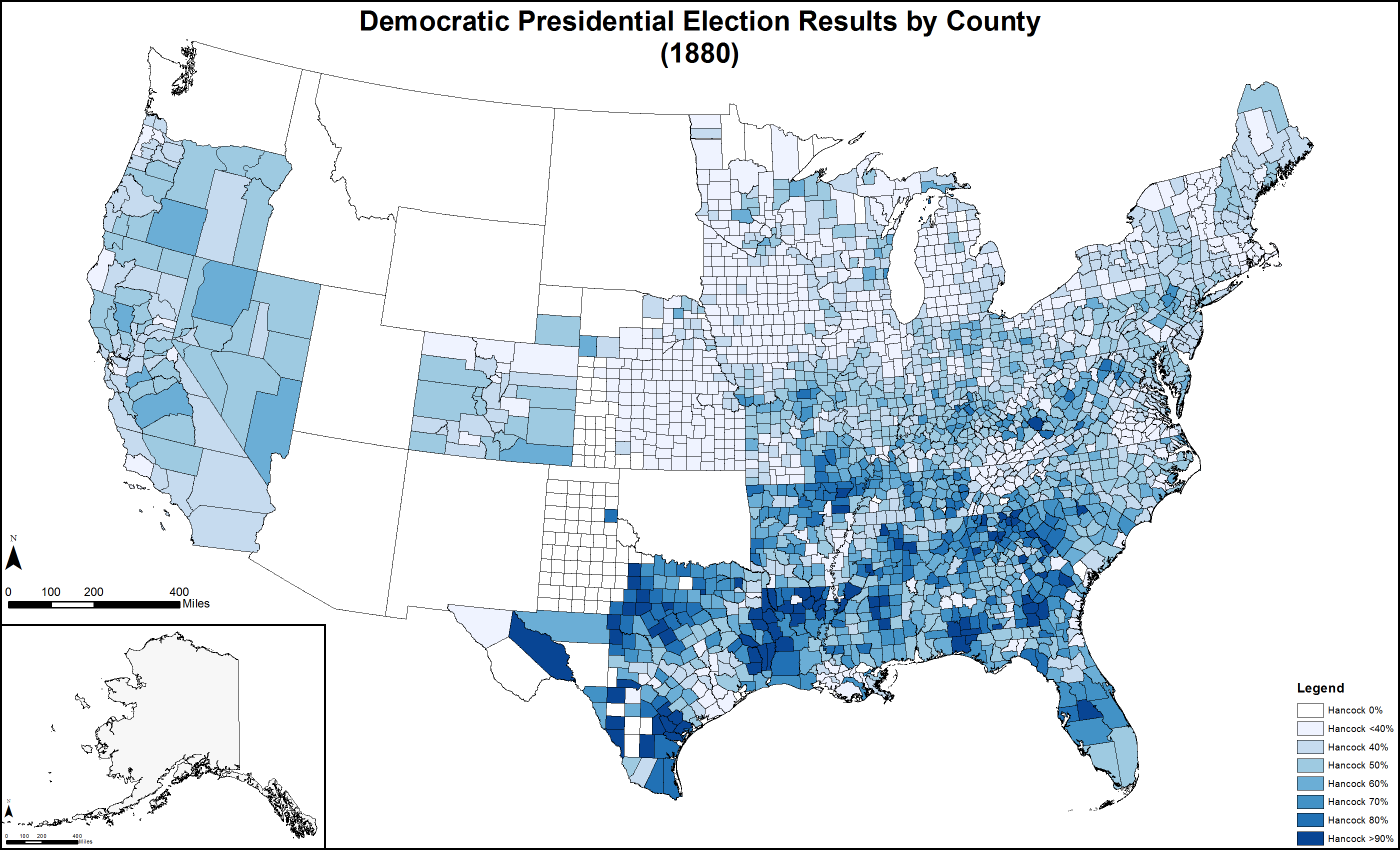
Map of Democratic presidential election results by county

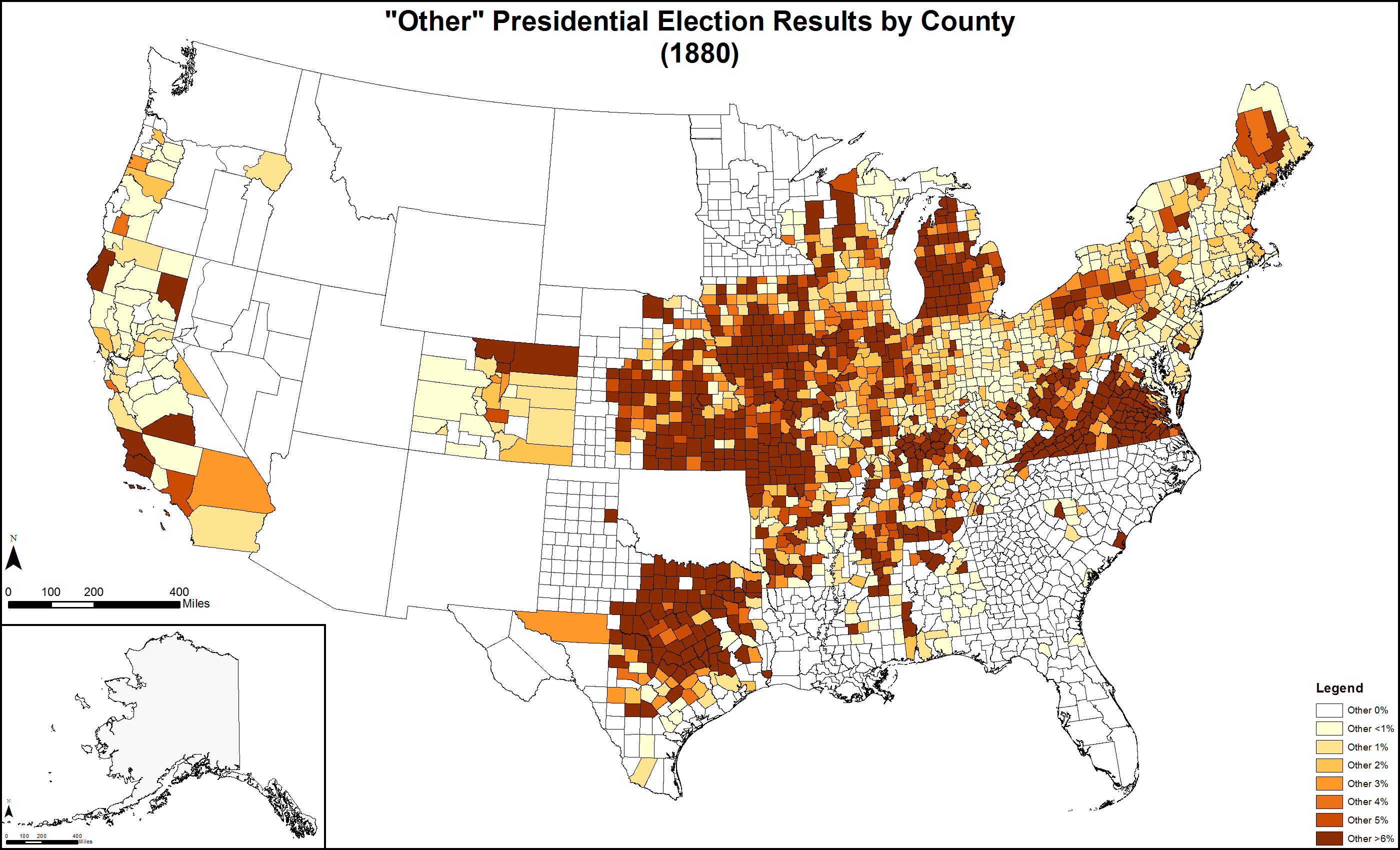
Map of "other" presidential election results by county
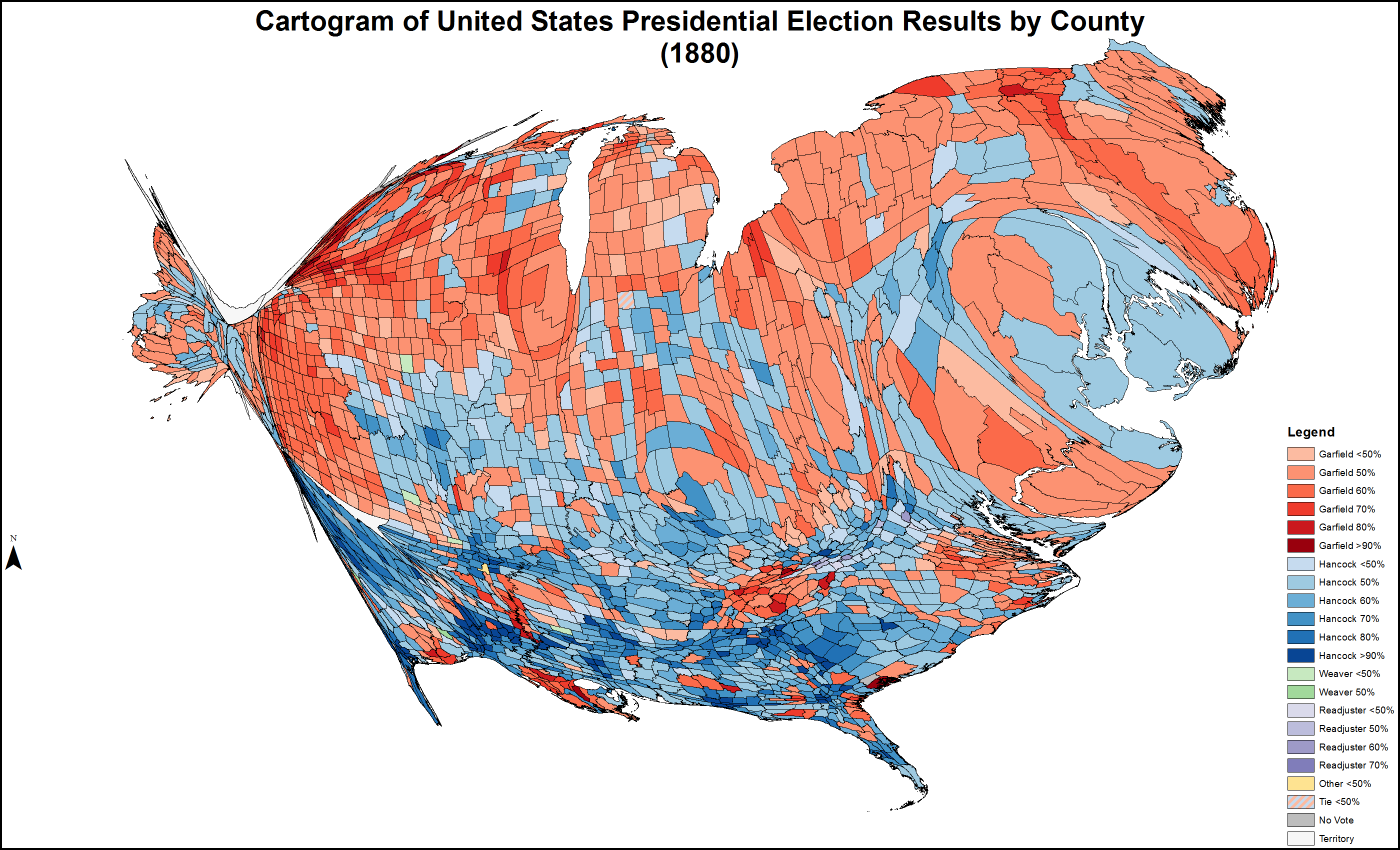
Cartogram of presidential election results by county

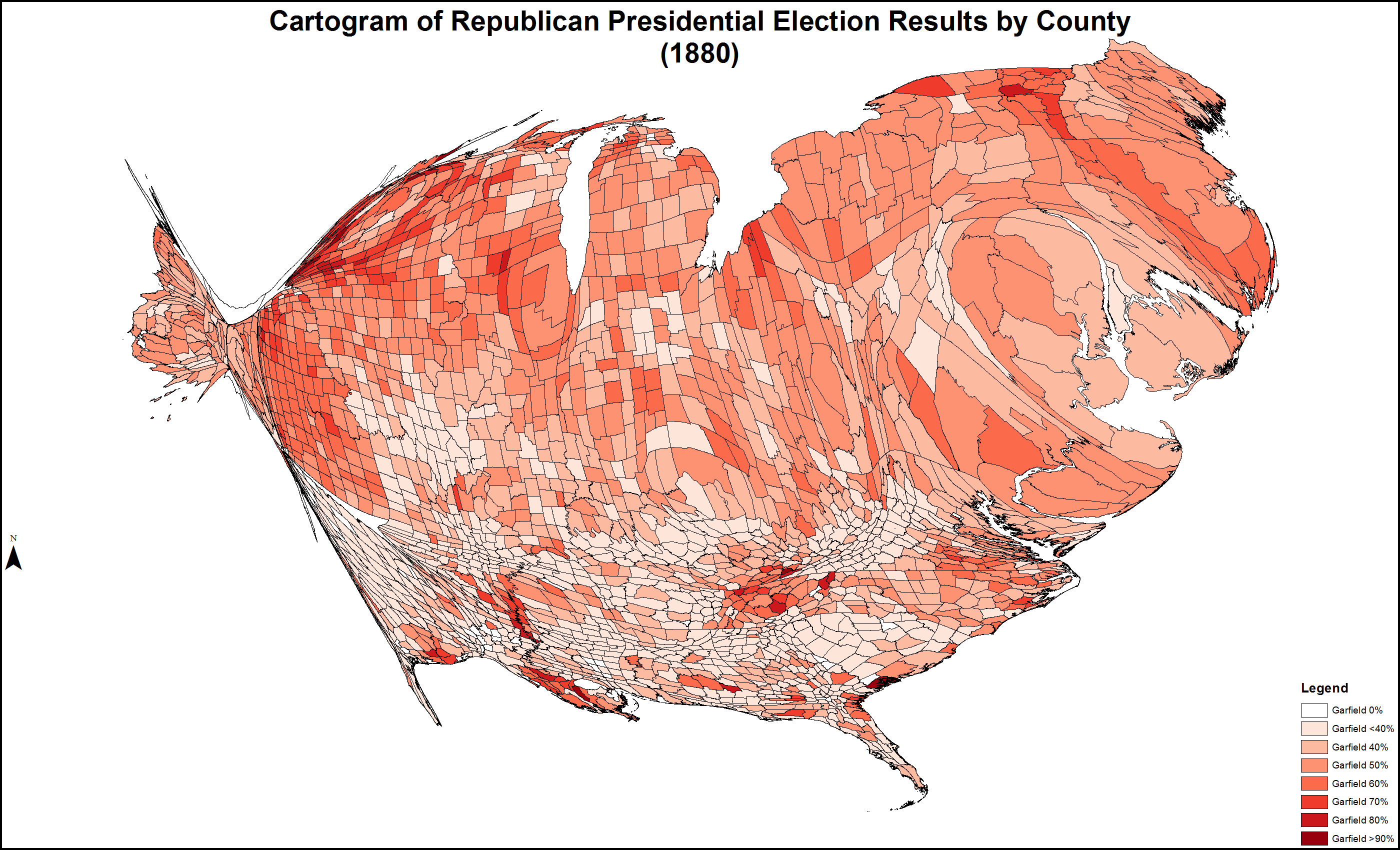
Cartogram of Republican presidential election results by county

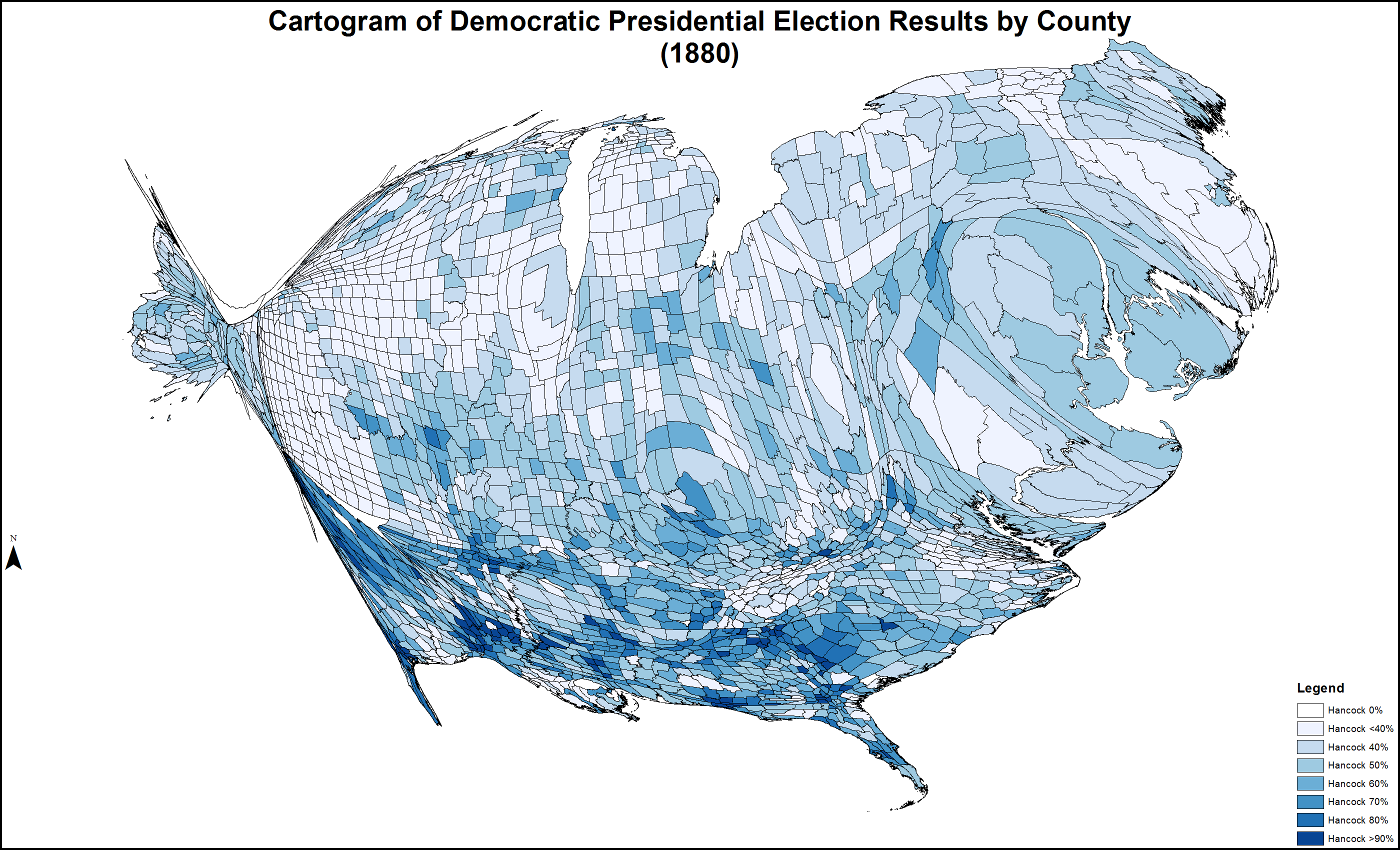
Cartogram of Democratic presidential election results by county

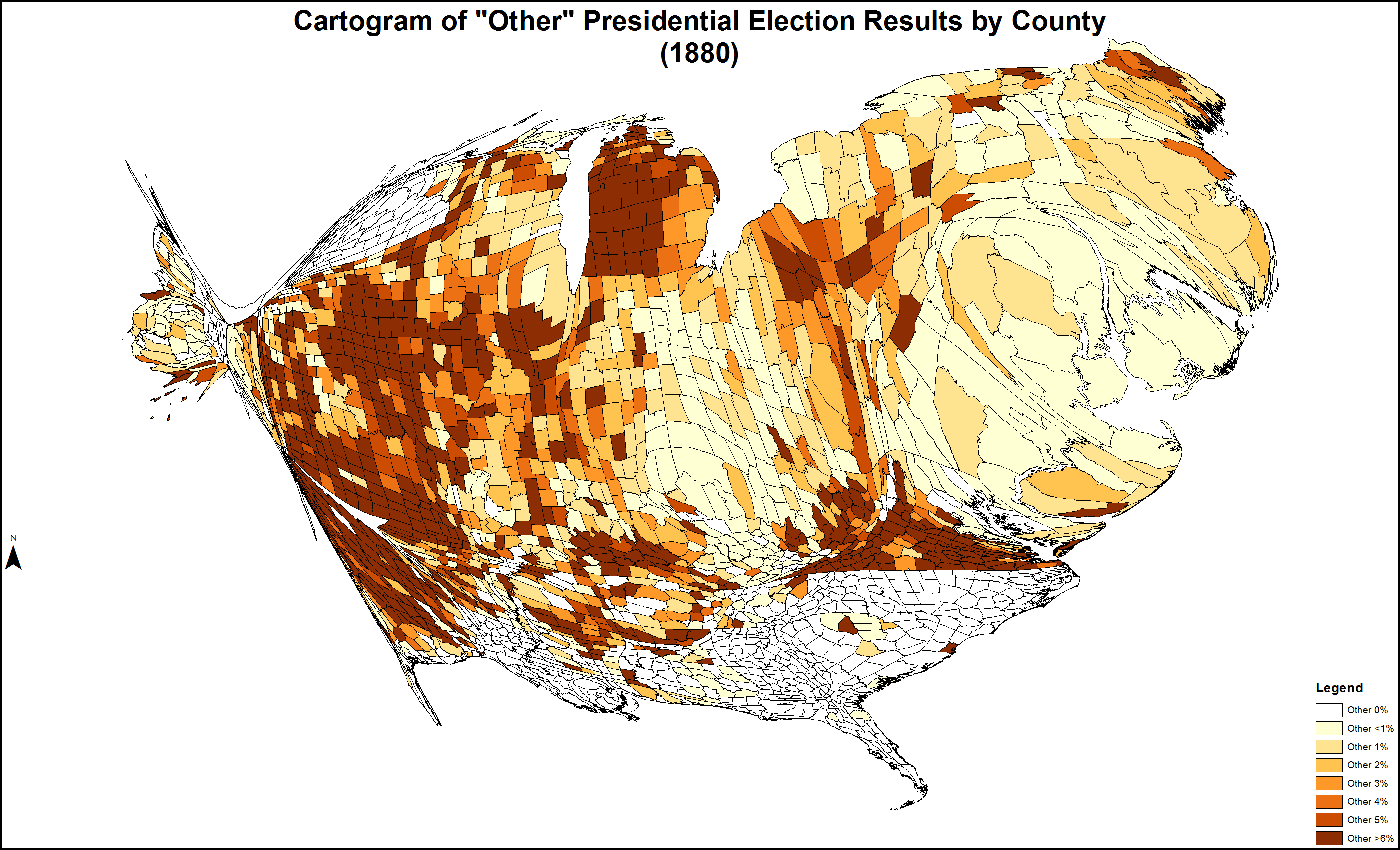
Cartogram of "other" presidential election results by county

=== Results by state ===
States/districts won by Hancock/English
States/districts won by Garfield/Arthur

		James Garfield Republican			Winfield Hancock Democratic			James Weaver Greenback			Neal Dow Prohibition			John Phelps Anti-Masonic			Margin		State Total	
State	electoral votes	#	%	electoral votes	#	%	electoral votes	#	%	electoral votes	#	%	electoral votes	#	%	electoral votes	#	%	#	
Alabama	10	56,221	36.98	–	91,185	59.97	10	4,642	3.05	–	–	–	–	–	–	–	−34,964	−22.99	152,048	AL
Arkansas	6	42,436	39.55	–	60,775	56.65	6	4,079	3.80	–	–	–	–	–	–	–	−18,339	−17.10	107,290	AR
California	6	80,348	48.92	1	80,442	48.98	5	3,394	2.07	–	61	0.04	–	6	0.00	–	−94	−0.06	164,321	CA
Colorado	3	27,450	51.26	3	24,647	46.03	–	1,435	2.68	–	–	–	–	–	–	–	2,803	5.23	53,546	CO
Connecticut	6	67,071	50.52	6	64,415	48.52	–	868	0.65	–	409	0.31	–	–	–	–	2,656	2.00	132,802	CT
Delaware	3	14,133	47.86	–	15,275	51.73	3	120	0.41	–	–	–	–	–	–	–	−1,142	−3.87	29,528	DE
Florida	4	23,654	45.83	–	27,964	54.17	4	–	–	–	–	–	–	–	–	–	−4,310	−8.35	51,618	FL
Georgia	11	54,086	34.33	–	102,470	65.05	11	–	–	–	–	–	–	–	–	–	−48,384	−30.72	156,556	GA
Illinois	21	318,037	51.11	21	277,321	44.56	–	26,358	4.24	–	443	0.07	–	153	0.02	–	40,716	6.54	622,312	IL
Indiana	15	232,164	49.33	15	225,522	47.91	–	12,986	2.76	–	–	–	–	–	–	–	6,642	1.41	470,672	IN
Iowa	11	183,927	56.85	11	105,845	32.72	–	32,701	10.11	–	592	0.18	–	433	0.13	–	78,082	24.13	323,498	IA
Kansas	5	121,549	60.40	5	59,801	29.72	–	19,851	9.87	–	25	0.01	–	–	–	–	61,748	30.68	201,226	KS
Kentucky	12	106,306	39.80	–	149,068	55.80	12	11,499	4.30	–	258	0.10	–	–	–	–	−42,762	−16.00	267,104	KY
Louisiana	8	38,637	37.10	–	65,067	62.48	8	439	0.42	–	–	–	–	–	–	–	−26,430	−25.38	104,143	LA
Maine	7	74,056	51.45	7	65,171	45.28	–	4,480	3.11	–	93	0.06	–	142	0.10	–	8,841	6.14	143,903	ME
Maryland	8	78,515	45.37	–	93,706	54.15	8	818	0.47	–	–	–	–	–	–	–	−15,191	−8.78	173,039	MD
Massachusetts	13	165,205	58.50	13	111,690	39.65	–	4,548	1.61	–	682	0.24	–	–	–	–	53,515	18.85	282,125	MA
Michigan	11	185,341	52.54	11	131,597	37.30	–	34,895	9.89	–	942	0.27	–	2	0.00	–	53,744	15.24	352,777	MI
Minnesota	5	93,903	62.28	5	53,315	35.36	–	3,267	2.17	–	286	0.19	–	–	–	–	40,587	26.92	150,771	MN
Mississippi	8	34,854	29.94	–	75,750	65.08	8	5,797	4.98	–	–	–	–	–	–	–	−40,896	−35.14	116,401	MS
Missouri	15	153,567	38.65	–	208,609	52.51	15	35,135	8.84	–	–	–	–	–	–	–	−55,042	−13.86	400,311	MO
Nebraska	3	54,979	62.87	3	28,523	32.62	–	3,950	4.52	–	–	–	–	–	–	–	26,456	30.25	87,452	NE
Nevada	3	8,732	47.60	–	9,613	52.40	3	–	–	–	–	–	–	–	–	–	−881	−4.80	18,345	NV
New Hampshire	5	44,852	51.94	5	40,794	47.24	–	528	0.61	–	180	0.21	–	–	–	–	4,058	4.70	86,354	NH
New Jersey	9	120,555	49.02	–	122,565	49.84	9	2,617	1.06	–	191	0.08	–	–	–	–	−2,010	−0.82	245,928	NJ
New York	35	555,544	50.32	35	534,511	48.42	–	12,373	1.12	–	1,517	0.14	–	75	.01	–	21,033	1.91	1,103,945	NY
North Carolina	10	115,874	48.04	–	124,208	51.49	10	1,126	0.47	–	–	–	–	–	–	–	−8,334	−3.45	241,208	NC
Ohio	22	375,048	51.73	22	340,821	47.01	–	6,456	0.89	–	2,616	0.36	–	–	–	–	34,227	4.72	724,967	OH
Oregon	3	20,619	50.51	3	19,955	48.89	–	245	0.60	–	–	–	–	–	–	–	664	1.64	40,819	OR
Pennsylvania	29	444,704	50.84	29	407,428	46.57	–	20,668	2.36	–	1,939	0.22	–	44	0.01	–	37,276	4.26	874,783	PA
Rhode Island	4	18,195	62.24	4	10,779	36.87	–	236	0.81	–	20	0.07	–	–	–	–	7,416	25.37	29,235	RI
South Carolina	7	58,071	33.97	–	112,312	65.70	7	566	0.33	–	–	–	–	–	–	–	−54,241	−31.73	170,949	SC
Tennessee	12	107,677	44.53	–	129,191	53.01	12	5,917	2.45	–	43	0.02	–	–	–	–	−21,514	−8.48	242,828	TN
Texas	8	57,893	23.95	–	156,428	64.71	8	27,405	11.34	–	–	–	–	–	–	–	−98,535	−40.76	241,726	TX
Vermont	5	45,567	69.88	5	18,316	28.09	–	1,215	1.86	–	–	–	–	105	0.16	–	27,251	41.79	65,203	VT
Virginia	11	83,533	39.47	–	128,083	60.53	11	–	–	–	–	–	–	–	–	–	−44,550	−21.05	211,616	VA
West Virginia	5	46,243	41.03	–	57,391	50.92	5	9,079	8.05	–	–	–	–	–	–	–	−11,148	−9.89	112,713	WV
Wisconsin	10	144,400	54.04	10	114,649	42.91	–	7,986	2.99	–	69	0.03	–	91	0.03	–	29,751	11.14	267,195	WI
TOTALS:	369	4,454,433	48.32	214	4,444,976	48.21	155	308,649	3.35	–	10,364	0.11	–	1,045	0.01	–	9,457	0.11	9,219,477	US

=== States that flipped from Republican to Democratic ===
- California
- Florida
- Louisiana
- Nevada
- South Carolina

=== States that flipped from Democratic to Republican ===
- Connecticut
- Indiana
- New York

=== Close states ===
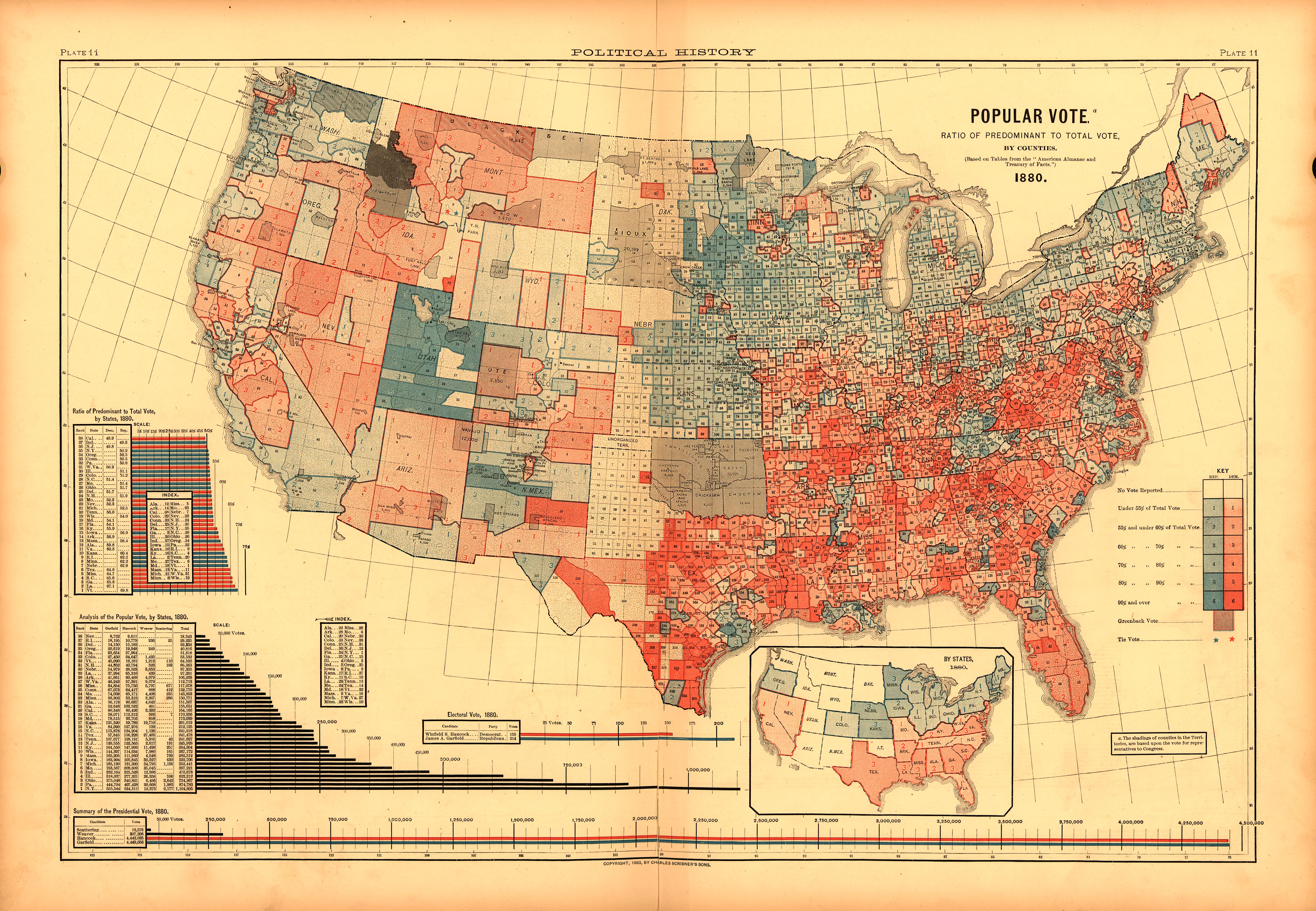
A map of the election results in Scribner's Statistical Atlas of the United States (1883)

Margin of victory less than 1% (15 electoral votes):

1. California, 0.06% (95 votes)
2. New Jersey, 0.82% (2,010 votes)

Margin of victory between 1% and 5% (131 electoral votes):

1. Indiana, 1.41% (6,642 votes)
2. Oregon, 1.64% (664 votes)
3. New York, 1.91% (21,033 votes) (tipping point state)
4. Connecticut, 2.00% (2,656 votes)
5. North Carolina, 3.45% (8,334 votes)
6. Delaware, 3.87% (1,142 votes)
7. Pennsylvania, 4.26% (37,276 votes)
8. New Hampshire, 4.70% (4,058 votes)
9. Ohio, 4.72% (34,227 votes)
10. Nevada, 4.80% (881 votes)

Margin of victory between 5% and 10% (58 electoral votes):

1. Colorado, 5.23% (2,803 votes)
2. Maine, 6.14% (8,841 votes)
3. Illinois, 6.54% (40,716 votes)
4. Florida, 8.35% (4,310 votes)
5. Tennessee, 8.48% (21,514 votes)
6. Maryland, 8.78% (15,191 votes)
7. West Virginia, 9.89% (11,148 votes)

== Aftermath ==
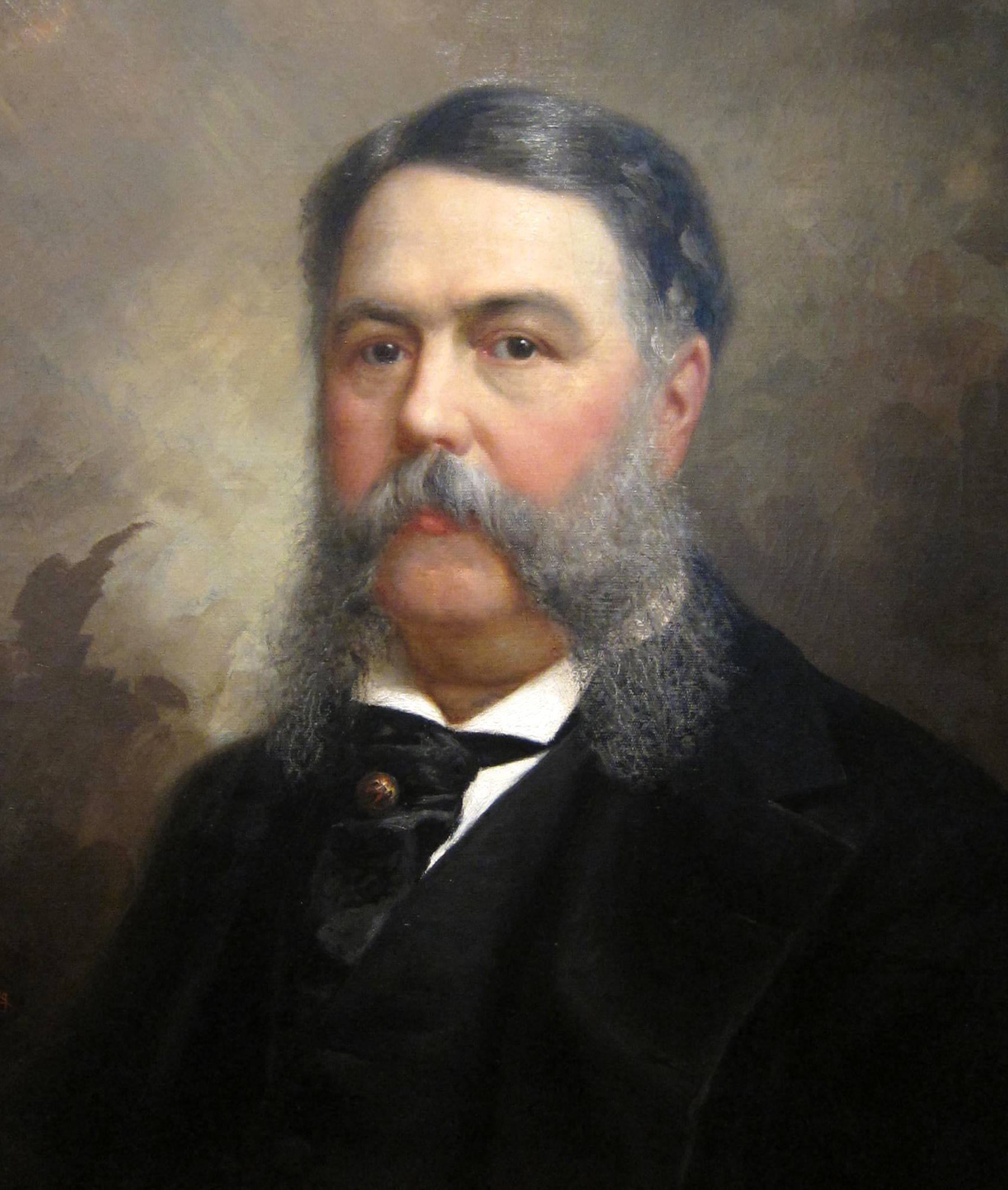
Chester Arthur succeeded to the presidency upon Garfield's 1881 assassination.

As Garfield entered office in March 1881, the Republican party schism that had been patched up for the election tore apart once more. Benjamin Perley wrote of the inauguration, "In the front and centre was a raised stage, on which was the chair once used by Washington. General Garfield occupied this seat of honor, with President Hayes on his right and Chief Justice Waite on his left. It was an impressive scene. Behind, as a background, rose the Capitol in its sublime grandeur and with its many memories ; all around were the dignitaries of the country, with many ladies, whose ribbons and flowers gave brilliancy to the scene ; and in front was an immense sea of upturned faces with lines of bristling bayonets, flags, plumes, and bright uniforms. When silence had been secured General Garfield rose took off his overcoat, advanced to the front of the stand, and delivered his inaugural address in clear tones and with ringing accents."

Garfield appointed Blaine to the cabinet, and Conkling's Stalwart faction became irked at their lack of control over patronage, even in Conkling's home state of New York. Garfield appointed William H. Robertson, a civil service reform supporter, to the most lucrative government post in New York, and refused to withdraw the nomination despite Conkling's protests; in response, Conkling and his allies brought all legislative action in the closely divided Senate to a halt. In May, Conkling and fellow New York Senator Thomas C. Platt resigned from the Senate in protest. The two Stalwarts expected the New York legislature to reelect them in triumph; instead, the legislature deadlocked for months, eventually declining to return either man to the Senate. Before that result was known, however, Charles Guiteau, a mentally unstable man angry about not receiving a patronage appointment, shot Garfield in Washington, D.C., on July 2, 1881.

Garfield lingered for 2 1/2 months before dying on September 19, 1881. Vice President Chester A. Arthur, the New York Stalwart, was sworn in as president that night. Garfield's murder by a spoilsman inspired the nation to reform the civil service—and Arthur, erstwhile member of the Conkling machine, joined the cause. In 1883, a bipartisan majority in Congress passed the Pendleton Civil Service Reform Act to reform the worst of the office-seeking system, and Arthur signed the measure into law.

Congress also settled the issue of Chinese immigration, passing the Chinese Exclusion Act in 1882. Arthur initially vetoed a similar measure, which he believed contradicted the United States' treaty with China, but eventually signed a compromise bill, which banned immigration from China for ten years. Tariffs, a major issue in the campaign, remained largely unchanged in the four years that followed, although Congress did pass a minor revision that reduced them by an average of less than 2 percent. After a half-hearted attempt at the nomination in 1884, Arthur retired and died two years later.

== See also ==
- American election campaigns in the 19th century
- History of the United States (1865–1918)
- Inauguration of James A. Garfield
- 1880 United States House of Representatives elections
- 1880–1881 United States Senate elections
- Third Party System

== Bibliography ==
Books

- Abramson, Paul; Aldrich, John; Rohde, David (1995). Change and Continuity in the 1992 Elections. CQ Press. ISBN 0871878399.
- Ackerman, Kenneth D. (2003). Dark Horse: The Surprise Election and Political Murder of President James A. Garfield. New York, New York: Carroll & Graf. ISBN 0-7867-1151-5.
- Burnham, Walter Dean (1955). Presidential Ballots, 1836–1892. Baltimore, Maryland: Johns Hopkins University Press. ISBN 0-405-07678-9.
- Cherny, Robert W. (1997). American Politics in the Gilded Age: 1868–1900. Wheeling, West Virginia: Harlan Davidson Inc. ISBN 0-88295-933-6.
- Clancy, Herbert J. (1958). The Presidential Election of 1880. Chicago, Illinois: Loyola University Press. ISBN 978-1-258-19190-0.
- Doenecke, Justus D. (1981). The Presidencies of James A. Garfield & Chester A. Arthur. Lawrence, Kansas: The Regents Press of Kansas. ISBN 0-7006-0208-9.
- Doenecke, Justus D. (2003). "Presidential election of 1880". In Leonard C. Schlup; James Gilbert Ryan (eds.). Historical Dictionary of the Gilded Age. M.E. Sharpe. p. 386. ISBN 9780765621061.
- Hoogenboom, Ari (1995). Rutherford Hayes: Warrior and President. Lawrence, Kansas: University Press of Kansas. ISBN 978-0-7006-0641-2.
- Jordan, David M. (1996) [1988]. Winfield Scott Hancock: A Soldier's Life. Bloomington, Indiana: Indiana University Press. ISBN 0-253-21058-5.
- Kleppner, Paul (1979). The Third Electoral System, 1853–1892: Parties, Voters, and Political Cultures. Chapel Hill, North Carolina: University of North Carolina Press. ISBN 0-8078-1328-1.
- Lause, Mark A. (2001). The Civil War's Last Campaign: James B. Weaver, the Greenback-Labor Party & the Politics of Race and Section. Lanham, Maryland: University Press of America. ISBN 0-7618-1917-7.
- McFeely, William S. (1981). Grant: A Biography. New York, New York: Norton. ISBN 0-393-01372-3.
- Mitchell, Robert B. (2008). Skirmisher: The Life, Times, and Political Career of James B. Weaver. Roseville, Minnesota: Edinborough Press. ISBN 978-1-889020-26-6.
- Moore, James Tice (1974). Two Paths to The New South: The Virginia Debt Controversy, 1870–1883. Lexington, Kentucky: University Press of Kentucky. ISBN 978-0-8131-5364-3.
- Morgan, H. Wayne. From Hayes to McKinley: National Party Politics, 1877–1896 (1969) pp 57–121. By H. Wayne Morgan. (Syracuse: Syracuse University Press, 1969. x + 618 pp. Illustrations ...
- Petersen, Svend (1963). A Statistical History of the American Presidential Elections. New York, New York: Frederick Ungar. OCLC 500975. Archived from the original on November 7, 2020 – via Questia.
- Peskin, Allan (1978). Garfield: A Biography. Kent, Ohio: Kent State University Press. ISBN 0-87338-210-2.
- Reeves, Thomas C. (1975). Gentleman Boss: The Life of Chester A. Arthur. New York, New York: Alfred A. Knopf. ISBN 978-0-394-46095-6.
- Sherman, Richard (1973). The Republican Party and Black America From McKinley to Hoover 1896-1933. University of Virginia Press. ISBN 0813904676.
- Thomas, Harrison Cook, The return of the Democratic Party to power in 1884 (1919) online
- Unger, Irwin (1964). The Greenback Era: A Social and Political History of American Finance, 1865–1879. Princeton, New Jersey: Princeton University Press. ISBN 0-691-04517-8.
- Wiebe, Robert H. (1967). The Search for Order: 1877–1920. New York, New York: Hill and Wang. ISBN 0-8090-0104-7.

Articles

- Barr, Alwyn (October 1967). "B. J. Chambers and the Greenback Party Split". Mid-America. 49: 276–284.
- Dinnerstein, Leonard. "Election of 1880." In Arthur Schlesinger Jr, ed. Running for President: The Candidates in their Images (1994) pp 345–83
- Hinckley, Ted C. (Autumn 1980). "The Politics of Sinophobia: Garfield, the Morey Letter, and the Presidential Election of 1880". Ohio History. 89: 381–399. Archived from the original on May 30, 2015.
- Peskin, Allan (Spring 1980). "The Election of 1880". The Wilson Quarterly. 4 (2): 172–181. JSTOR 40255831.

Web and other sources

- "Historical Election Results: Electoral College Box Scores 1789–1996". National Archives and Records Administration. 2012.

=== Primary sources ===
- Chester, Edward W A guide to political platforms (1977) online
- Porter, Kirk H. and Donald Bruce Johnson, eds. National party platforms, 1840-1964 (1965) online 1840-1956

=== Further reading ===
- Jensen, Richard J. (1971). The Winning of the Midwest: Social and Political Conflict, 1888–1896. Chicago, Illinois: University of Chicago Press. ISBN 0-226-39825-0.
