= 1880 United States presidential election in Minnesota =

US presidential election

- November 2, 1880
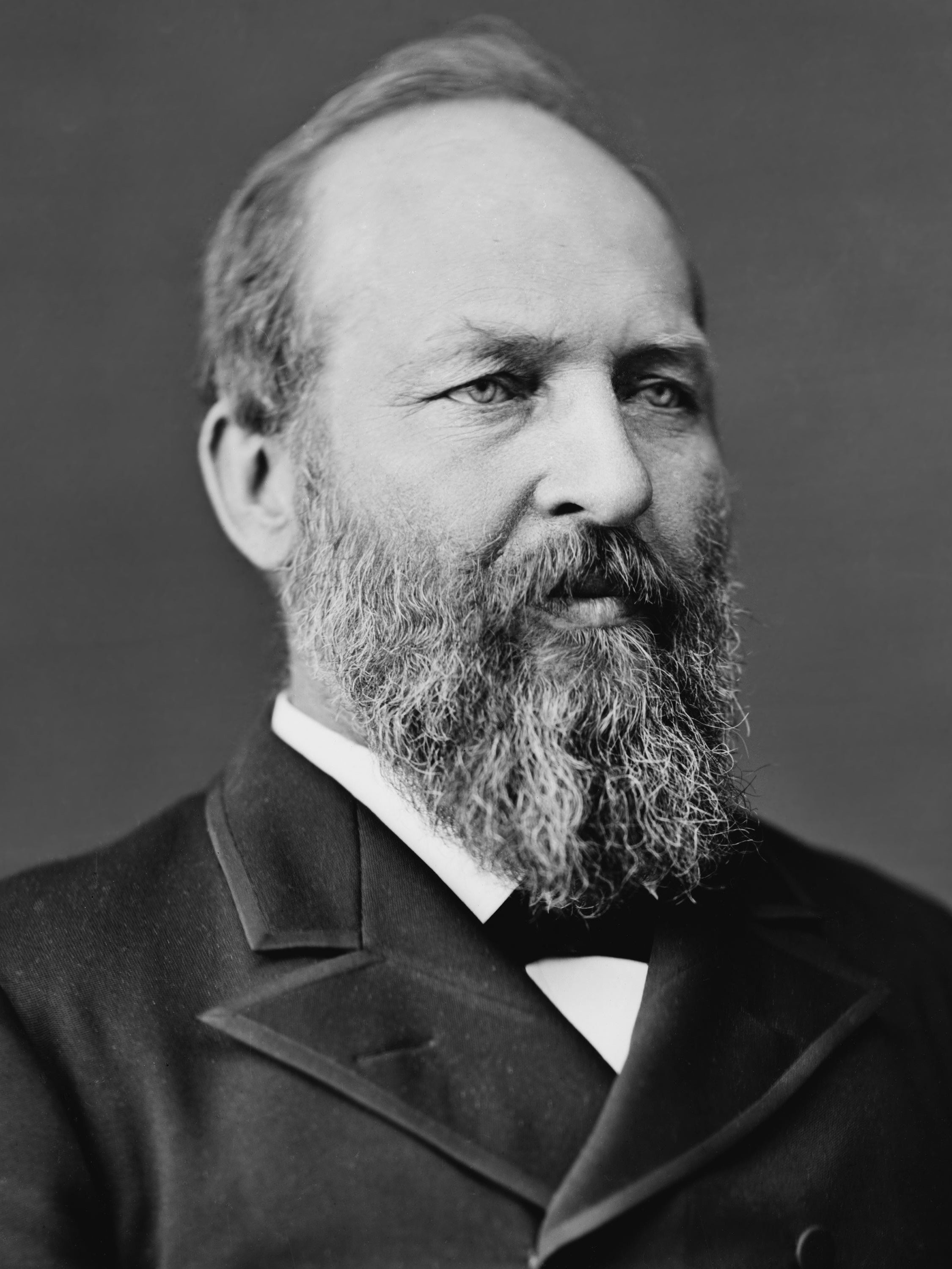

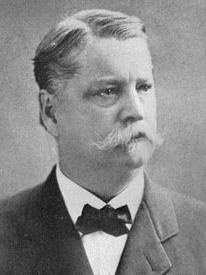
Nominee	James A. Garfield	Winfield Scott Hancock
Party	Republican	Democratic
Home state	Ohio	Pennsylvania
Running mate	Chester A. Arthur	William Hayden English
Electoral vote	5	0
Popular vote	93,902	53,315
Percentage	62.28%	35.36%
County results
Garfield
50–60%
60–70%
70–80%
80–90%
90–100%
Hancock
50–60%
60–70%
President before election
Rutherford B. Hayes
Republican
Elected President
James A. Garfield
Republican

The 1880 United States presidential election in Minnesota took place on November 2, 1880, as part of the 1880 United States presidential election. Voters chose five representatives, or electors to the Electoral College, who voted for president and vice president.

Minnesota voted for the Republican nominee, James A. Garfield, over the Democratic nominee, Winfield Scott Hancock. Garfield won the state by a margin of 26.92%.

With 62.28% of the popular vote, Minnesota would be Garfield's third strongest victory in terms of percentage in the popular vote after Vermont and Nebraska.

== Results ==
1880 United States presidential election in Minnesota
Party	Candidate	Running mate	Popular vote		Electoral vote	
Party	Candidate	Running mate	Count	%	Count	%
Republican	James Abram Garfield of Ohio	Chester Alan Arthur of New York	93,902	62.28%	5	100.00%
Democratic	Winfield Scott Hancock of Pennsylvania	William Hayden English of Indiana	53,315	35.36%	0	0.00%
Greenback	James Baird Weaver of Iowa	Barzillai Jefferson Chambers of Texas	3,267	2.17%	0	0.00%
Prohibition	Neal Dow of Maine	Henry Adams Thompson of Ohio	286	0.19%	0	0.00%
Total			150,770	100.00%	5	100.00%

== See also ==
- United States presidential elections in Minnesota
