= Allan Peskin =

American historian and university professor

Allan J. Peskin (1933–2018) was an American history professor and author. From 1962 to 2000 he was a professor at Cleveland State University. He wrote a book about U.S. president James Garfield titled "Garfield: A Biography". He also wrote a book about Winfield Scott.

== Works ==
- Garfield: A Biography, Kent State University Press (1978)
- Winfield Scott and the Profession of Arms, Kent State University Press (2003)
