= 1880 United States presidential election in Vermont =

- November 2, 1880
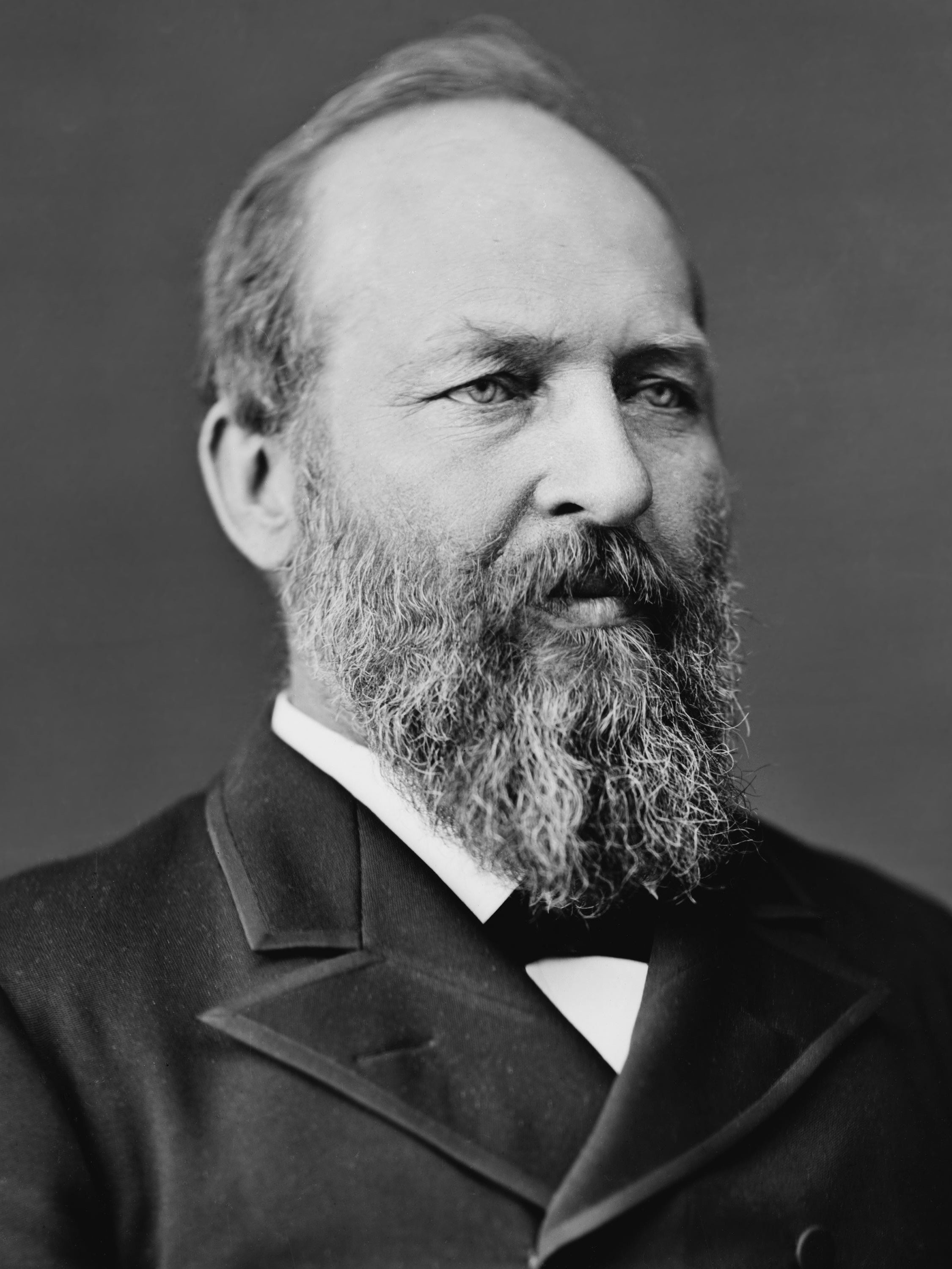

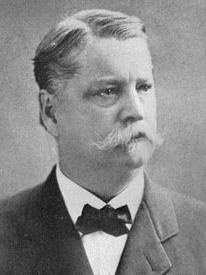
Nominee	James A. Garfield	Winfield Scott Hancock
Party	Republican	Democratic
Home state	Ohio	Pennsylvania
Running mate	Chester A. Arthur	William Hayden English
Electoral vote	5	0
Popular vote	45,091	18,182
Percentage	69.81%	28.15%

Garfield
50–60%
60–70%
70–80%
80–90%
90–100%
Hancock
40–50%
50–60%
60–70%
70–80%
President before election
Rutherford B. Hayes
Republican
Elected President
James A. Garfield
Republican

The 1880 United States presidential election in Vermont took place on November 2, 1880, as part of the 1880 United States presidential election. Voters chose five representatives, or electors to the Electoral College, who voted for president and vice president.

Vermont voted for the Republican nominee, James A. Garfield, over the Democratic nominee, Winfield Scott Hancock. Garfield won Vermont by a margin of 41.66%.

With 69.81% of the popular vote, Vermont would be Garfield's strongest victory in terms of percentage in the popular vote.

The Republican vice presidential nominee Chester Alan Arthur was born in Vermont, more specifically in the town of Fairfield. Despite this the town was won by Hancock.

== Results ==
1880 United States presidential election in Vermont
Party	Candidate	Running mate	Popular vote		Electoral vote	
Party	Candidate	Running mate	Count	%	Count	%
Republican	James Abram Garfield of Ohio	Chester Alan Arthur of New York	45,091	69.81%	5	100.00%
Democratic	Winfield Scott Hancock of Pennsylvania	William Hayden English of Indiana	18,182	28.15%	0	0.00%
Greenback	James Baird Weaver of Iowa	Barzillai Jefferson Chambers of Texas	1,212	1.88%	0	0.00%
N/A	Others	Others	109 (Note: These “other” votes were not recorded by county.)	0.17%	0	0.00%
Total			48,829	100.00%	5	100.00%

=== Results by county ===
County	James Abram Garfield Republican		Winfield Scott Hancock Democratic		James Baird Weaver Greenback		Margin		Total votes cast (Note: These totals differ from those given in Dave Leip’s Atlas.)
County	#	%	#	%	#	%	#	%	Total votes cast
Addison	3,842	85.72%	585	13.05%	55	1.23%	3,257	72.67%	4,482
Bennington	2,641	64.71%	1,440	35.29%	0	0.00%	1,201	29.43%	4,081
Caledonia	3,134	69.11%	1,372	30.25%	29	0.64%	1,762	38.85%	4,535
Chittenden	3,902	64.86%	2,020	33.58%	94	1.56%	1,882	31.28%	6,016
Essex	853	64.14%	472	35.49%	5	0.38%	381	28.65%	1,330
Franklin	3,018	60.07%	1,652	32.88%	354	7.05%	1,366	27.19%	5,024
Grand Isle	397	60.80%	239	36.60%	17	2.60%	158	24.20%	653
Lamoille	1,702	66.56%	587	22.96%	268	10.48%	1,115	43.61%	2,557
Orange	3,107	65.14%	1,631	34.19%	32	0.67%	1,476	30.94%	4,770
Orleans	2,911	77.79%	804	21.49%	27	0.72%	2,107	56.31%	3,742
Rutland	5,690	69.79%	2,421	29.69%	42	0.52%	3,269	40.10%	8,153
Washington	3,611	62.67%	1,927	33.44%	224	3.89%	1,684	29.23%	5,762
Windham	4,637	76.37%	1,426	23.48%	9	0.15%	3,211	52.88%	6,072
Windsor	6,122	77.29%	1,740	21.97%	59	0.74%	4,382	55.32%	7,921
Totals	45,567	70.00%	18,316	28.14%	1,215	1.87%	27,251	41.86%	65,098

== See also ==
- United States presidential elections in Vermont
