= 1886–87 United States Senate elections =

Senate elections in the United States

1886–1887 United States Senate elections
- Dates vary by state
- Class 1

25 of the 76 seats in the United States Senate (as well as special elections) 39 seats needed for a majority
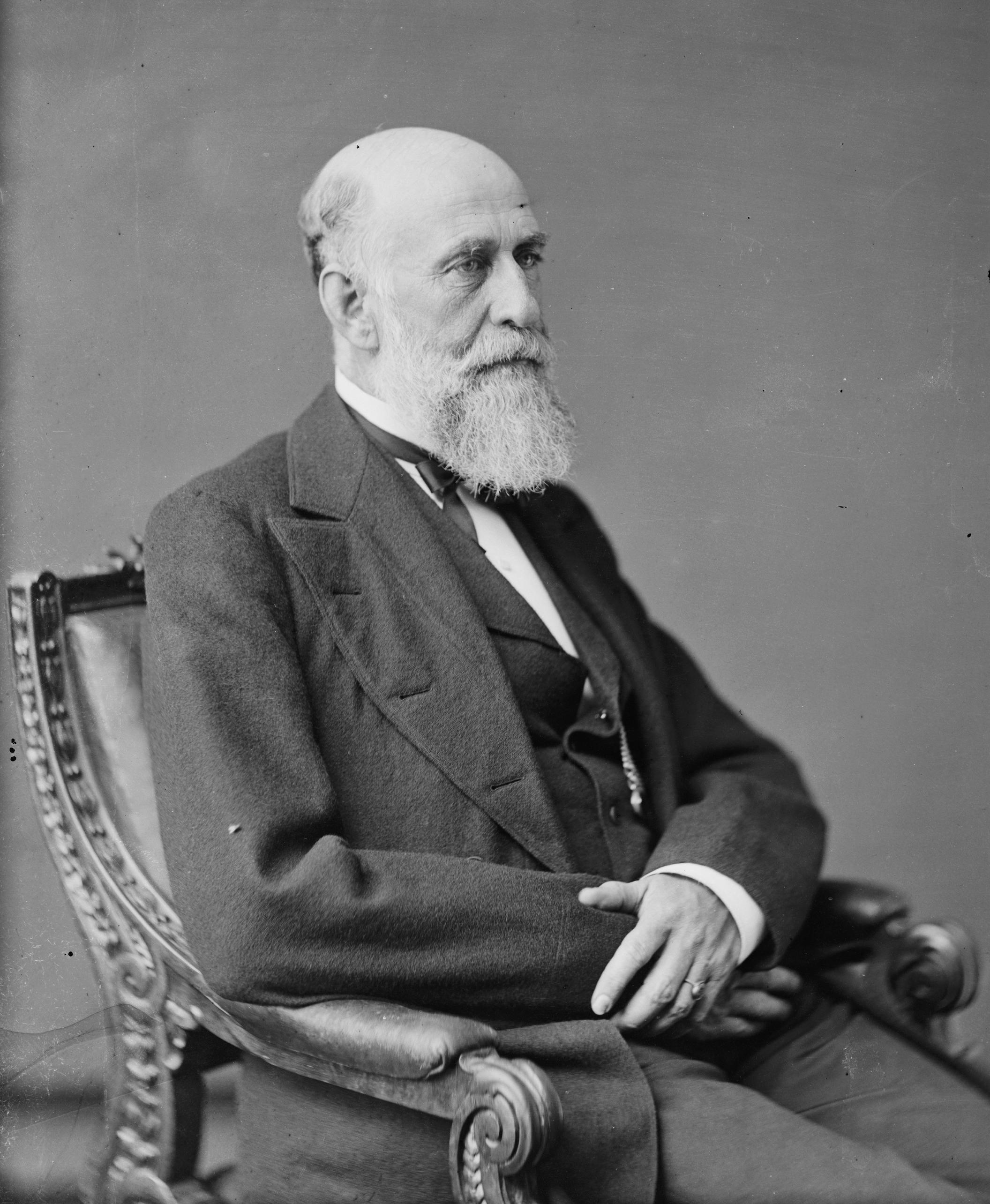

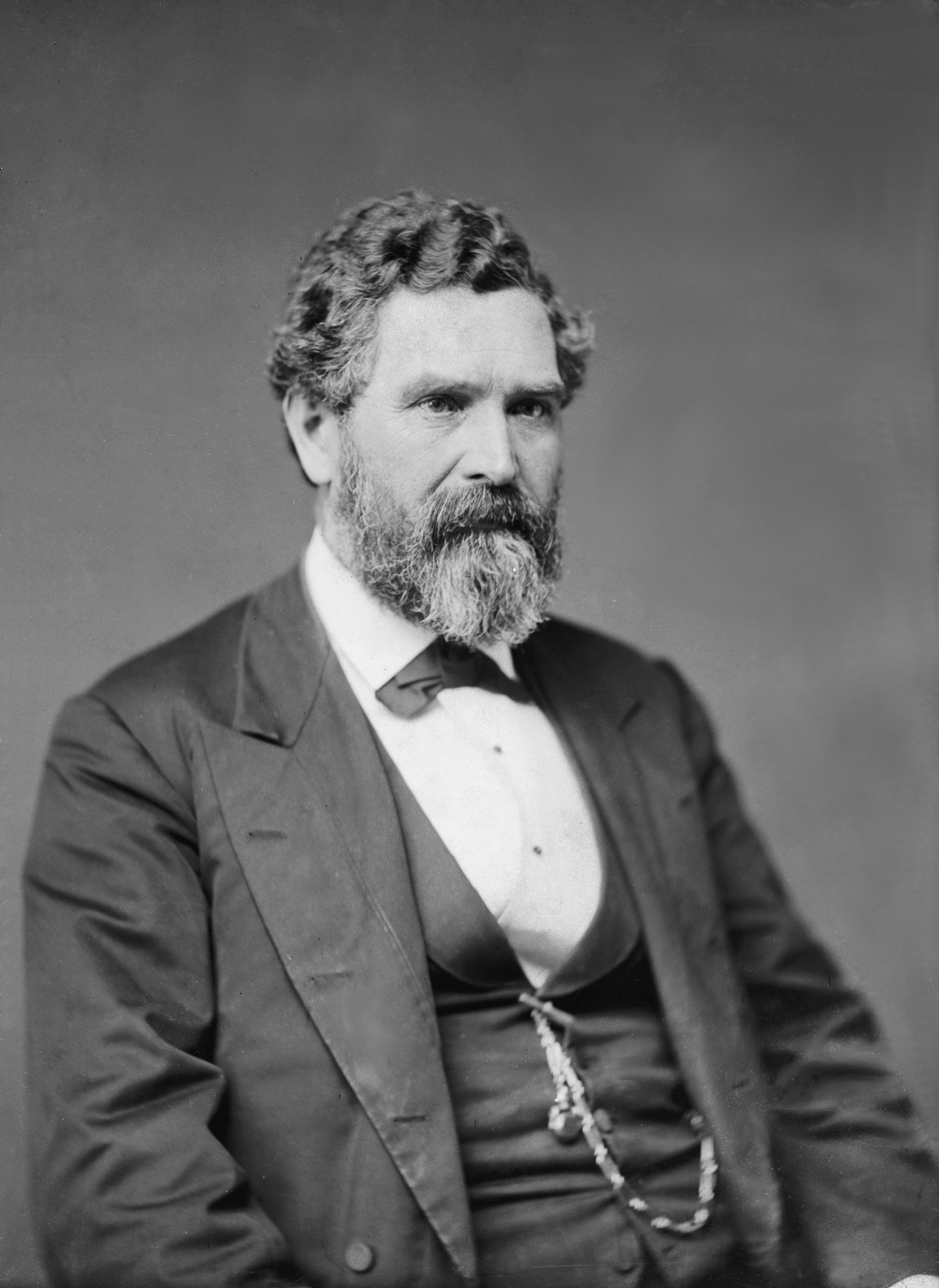

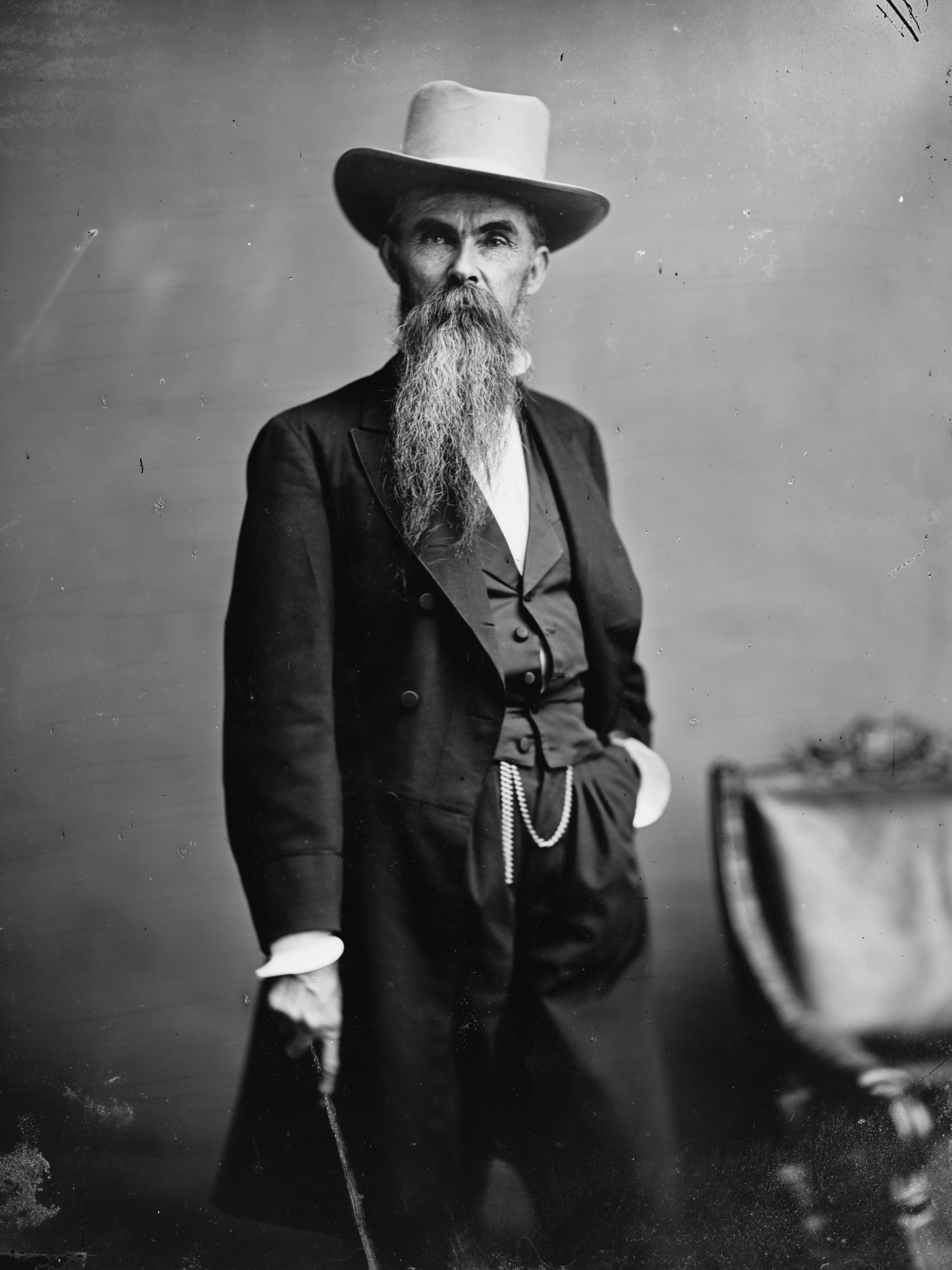
	Majority party	Minority party	Third party
Leader	George F. Edmunds (Note: as Republican Conference Chair)	James B. Beck (Note: as Democratic Caucus Chair)	William Mahone (Note: as the leader of Readjuster Party) (Lost re-election)
Party	Republican	Democratic	Readjuster
Leader since	March 4, 1885	March 4, 1885	March 4, 1881
Leader's seat	Vermont	Kentucky	Virginia
Seats before	40	34	2
Seats won	13	11	0
Seats after	38	36	1
Seat change	▼2	▲2	▼1
Seats up	15	9	1
- Results of the elections: Democratic gain Democratic hold Republican gain Republican hold Legislature failed to elect
Majority Party before election
Republican (Note: The Readjusters caucused with the Republicans.)
Elected Majority Party
Republican

The 1886–87 United States Senate elections were held on various dates in various states. As these U.S. Senate elections were prior to the ratification of the Seventeenth Amendment in 1913, senators were chosen by state legislatures. Senators were elected over a wide range of time throughout 1886 and 1887, and a seat may have been filled months late or remained vacant due to legislative deadlock. In these elections, terms were up for the senators in Class 1.

The Republican Party lost two seats. At the beginning of the 50th Congress, therefore, Republicans had the slimmest possible majority due to a vacant Democratic seat: 38 out of 75 seats. Once that vacancy was filled, Republicans maintained control as the single Readjuster senator caucused with them.

== Results summary ==
Colored shading indicates party with largest share of that row.

Parties				Total
Parties	Democratic	Readjuster	Republican	Total
Before these elections	34	2	40	78
Not up	25	1	25	51
Class 2 (1886/87 → 1892/93)	13	1	12	26
Class 3 (1884/85 → 1890/91)	11	—	13	24
Up	11	1	16	28
Regular: Class 1	9	1	15	25
Special: Class 1	1	—	—	1
Special: Class 2	1	—	—	1
Special: Class 3	—	—	1	1
Regular election only
Incumbent retired	1	—	2	3
Held by same party	—	—	1	1
Gained by other party	▲1	—	▼1	1
No elected successor	1	—	—	1
Result	1	—	1	2
Incumbent ran	6	1	12	19
Won re-election	4	—	7	11
Held by same party	1	—	3	4
Gained by other party	▼1	—	▲1	▲▼4
Gained by other party	▲2	—	▼2	▲▼4
Gained by other party	▲1	▼1	—	▲▼4
No elected successor	—	—	—	—
Result	8	—	11	19
Incumbent's action unknown	2	—	1	3
Held by same party	2	—	1	3
No elected successor	—	—	—	—
Gained by other party	—	—	—	—
Result	2	—	1	3
Total elected	11	—	13	24
Net change	▲2	▼1	▼2	▼1
Result	36	1	38	75

== Change in composition ==
=== Before the elections ===
After August 4, 1886, special election in California.

D_{8}	D_{7}	D_{6}	D_{5}	D_{4}	D_{3}	D_{2}	D_{1}		
D_{9}	D_{10}	D_{11}	D_{12}	D_{13}	D_{14}	D_{15}	D_{16}	D_{17}	D_{18}
D_{28} Ran	D_{27} Ran	D_{26} Ran	D_{25}	D_{24}	D_{23}	D_{22}	D_{21}	D_{20}	D_{19}
D_{29} Ran	D_{30} Ran	D_{31} Ran	D_{32} Unknown	D_{33} Unknown	D_{34} Retired	RA_{2} Ran	RA_{1}	R_{40} Retired	R_{39} Retired
Majority →									R_{39} Retired
R_{29} Ran	R_{30} Ran	R_{31} Ran	R_{32} Ran	R_{33} Ran	R_{34} Ran	R_{35} Ran	R_{36} Ran	R_{37} Ran	R_{38} Unknown
R_{28} Ran	R_{27} Ran	R_{26} Ran	R_{25}	R_{24}	R_{23}	R_{22}	R_{21}	R_{20}	R_{19}
R_{9}	R_{10}	R_{11}	R_{12}	R_{13}	R_{14}	R_{15}	R_{16}	R_{17}	R_{18}
R_{8}	R_{7}	R_{6}	R_{5}	R_{4}	R_{3}	R_{2}	R_{1}		

=== After the elections ===
D_{8}	D_{7}	D_{6}	D_{5}	D_{4}	D_{3}	D_{2}	D_{1}		
D_{9}	D_{10}	D_{11}	D_{12}	D_{13}	D_{14}	D_{15}	D_{16}	D_{17}	D_{18}
D_{28} Re-elected	D_{27} Re-elected	D_{26} Re-elected	D_{25}	D_{24}	D_{23}	D_{22}	D_{21}	D_{20}	D_{19}
D_{29} Re-elected	D_{30} Hold	D_{31} Hold	D_{32} Hold	D_{33} Gain from RA	D_{34} Gain from R	D_{35} Gain from R	D_{36} Gain from R	V_{1} D Loss	RA_{1}
Majority due to vacancy→									R_{38} Gain from D
R_{29} Re-elected	R_{30} Re-elected	R_{31} Re-elected	R_{32} Re-elected	R_{33} Hold	R_{34} Hold	R_{35} Hold	R_{36} Hold	R_{37} Hold	R_{38} Gain from D
R_{28} Re-elected	R_{27} Re-elected	R_{26} Re-elected	R_{25}	R_{24}	R_{23}	R_{22}	R_{21}	R_{20}	R_{19}
R_{9}	R_{10}	R_{11}	R_{12}	R_{13}	R_{14}	R_{15}	R_{16}	R_{17}	R_{18}
R_{8}	R_{7}	R_{6}	R_{5}	R_{4}	R_{3}	R_{2}	R_{1}		

=== At the beginning of the first session, December 7, 1887 ===
D_{8}	D_{7}	D_{6}	D_{5}	D_{4}	D_{3}	D_{2}	D_{1}		
D_{9}	D_{10}	D_{11}	D_{12}	D_{13}	D_{14}	D_{15}	D_{16}	D_{17}	D_{18}
D_{28}	D_{27}	D_{26}	D_{25}	D_{24}	D_{23}	D_{22}	D_{21}	D_{20}	D_{19}
D_{29}	D_{30}	D_{31}	D_{32}	D_{33}	D_{34}	D_{35}	D_{36}	D_{37} Gain from V	RA_{1}
Majority with Readjuster in caucus →									R_{38}
R_{29}	R_{30}	R_{31}	R_{32}	R_{33}	R_{34}	R_{35}	R_{36}	R_{37}	R_{38}
R_{28}	R_{27}	R_{26}	R_{25} Hold	R_{24}	R_{23}	R_{22}	R_{21}	R_{20}	R_{19}
R_{9}	R_{10}	R_{11}	R_{12}	R_{13}	R_{14}	R_{15}	R_{16}	R_{17}	R_{18}
R_{8}	R_{7}	R_{6}	R_{5}	R_{4}	R_{3}	R_{2}	R_{1}		

Key

D_{#}	Democratic
RA_{#}	Readjuster
R_{#}	Republican
V_{#}	Vacant

== Race summaries ==
=== Elections during the 49th Congress ===
In these elections, the winners were seated during 1886 or in 1887 before March 4; ordered by election date.

State	Incumbent			Results	Candidates
State	Senator	Party	Electoral history	Results	Candidates
Mississippi (Class 2)	Edward C. Walthall	Democratic	1885 (appointed)	Interim appointee elected January 20, 1886.	▌ ✓ Edward C. Walthall (Democratic); [data missing]
California (Class 1)	George Hearst	Democratic	1886 (appointed)	Interim appointee retired or lost election to finish the term. New senator elected August 4, 1886. Republican gain. Winner did not run for election to the next term; see below.	▌ ✓ Abram Williams (Republican); [data missing]
Illinois (Class 3)	John A. Logan	Republican	1870–71; 1877 (lost); 1879; 1885	Incumbent died December 26, 1886. New senator elected January 19, 1887. Republican hold.	▌ ✓ Charles B. Farwell (Republican); [data missing]

=== Races leading to the 50th Congress ===
In these regular elections, the winners were elected for the term beginning March 4, 1887; ordered by state.

All of the elections involved the Class 1 seats.

State	Incumbent			Results	Candidates
State	Senator	Party	Electoral history	Results	Candidates
California	Abram Williams	Republican	1886 (special)	Incumbent retired. New senator elected in 1887. Democratic gain.	▌ ✓ George Hearst (Democratic); [data missing]
Connecticut	Joseph R. Hawley	Republican	1881	Incumbent re-elected in 1887.	▌ ✓ Joseph R. Hawley (Republican); [data missing]
Delaware	George Gray	Democratic	1885 (special)	Incumbent re-elected in 1887.	▌ ✓ George Gray (Democratic); [data missing]
Florida	Charles W. Jones	Democratic	1881	Incumbent retired. Legislature failed to elect. Democratic loss.	[data missing]
Indiana	Benjamin Harrison	Republican	1881	Incumbent lost re-election. New senator elected in 1887. Democratic gain.	▌ ✓ David Turpie (Democratic); ▌Benjamin Harrison (Republican); [data missing]
Maine	Eugene Hale	Republican	1881	Incumbent re-elected.	First ballot (January 18, 1887): ▌ ✓ Eugene Hale (Republican) 114 H; 27 S; ▌William Henry Clifford Sr. (Democratic) 26 H; 3 S; ▌Neal Dow (Prohibition) 1 H; 0 S; ▌Absent 10 H; 1 S
Maryland	Arthur P. Gorman	Democratic	1880	Incumbent re-elected in 1886.	▌ ✓ Arthur P. Gorman (Democratic); [data missing]
Massachusetts	Henry L. Dawes	Republican	1857; 1881	Incumbent re-elected in 1887.	▌ ✓ Henry L. Dawes (Republican); [data missing]
Michigan	Omar D. Conger	Republican	1881	Incumbent lost renomination. New senator elected in 1887. Republican hold.	▌ ✓ Francis B. Stockbridge (Republican); [data missing]
Minnesota	Samuel J. R. McMillan	Republican	1881	Incumbent retired. New senator elected in 1886. Republican hold.	▌ ✓ Cushman Davis (Republican); [data missing]
Mississippi	James Z. George	Democratic	1880	Incumbent re-elected in 1886.	▌ ✓ James Z. George (Democratic); [data missing]
Missouri	Francis Cockrell	Democratic	1874; 1881	Incumbent re-elected in 1887.	▌ ✓ Francis Cockrell (Democratic); [data missing]
Nebraska	Charles Van Wyck	Republican	1880	Incumbent lost re-election. New senator elected in 1886. Republican hold.	▌ ✓ Algernon Paddock (Republican); ▌Charles Van Wyck (Republican); [data missing]
Nevada	James G. Fair	Democratic	1881	Incumbent lost re-election. New senator elected in 1887. Republican gain.	▌ ✓ William M. Stewart (Republican); ▌James G. Fair (Democratic); [data missing]
New Jersey	William J. Sewell	Republican	1881	Incumbent lost re-election. New senator elected in 1886. Democratic gain.	▌ ✓ Rufus Blodgett (Democratic); ▌William J. Sewell (Republican); [data missing]
New York	Warner Miller	Republican	1881 (special)	Incumbent lost renomination. New senator elected January 20, 1887. Republican hold.	▌ ✓ Frank Hiscock (Republican); ▌Levi P. Morton (Republican); ▌Smith M. Weed (Democratic); ▌Francis Kernan (Democratic)
Ohio	John Sherman	Republican	1861 (special); 1866; 1872; 1877 (resigned); 1881	Incumbent re-elected in 1886.	▌ ✓ John Sherman (Republican); [data missing]
Pennsylvania	John I. Mitchell	Republican	1881	Incumbent retired or lost re-election. New senator elected January 18, 1887. Republican hold.	▌ ✓ Matthew Quay (Republican) 65.74%; ▌Simon P. Wolverton (Democratic) 31.87%
Rhode Island	Nelson W. Aldrich	Republican	1881 (special)	Incumbent re-elected in 1886.	▌ ✓ Nelson W. Aldrich (Republican); [data missing]
Tennessee	Washington C. Whitthorne	Democratic	1886 (appointed)	Interim appointee retired or lost re-election. New senator elected in 1887. Democratic hold.	▌ ✓ William B. Bate (Democratic); [data missing]
Texas	Samuel B. Maxey	Democratic	1875; 1881	Incumbent lost re-election New senator elected January 25–February 1 1887. Democratic hold.	▌ ✓ John H. Reagan (Democratic) 101; ▌ Samuel B. Maxey (Democratic) 25; ▌ John Ireland (Democratic) 5; ▌ Oran Milo Roberts (Democratic) 4; ▌ Alexander W. Terrell (Democratic) 1
Vermont	George F. Edmunds	Republican	1866 (appointed); 1866 (special); 1868; 1874; 1880	Incumbent re-elected in 1886.	▌ ✓ George F. Edmunds (Republican), 227; ▌ W. H. H. Bingham (Democratic), 29; ▌ Wheelock G. Veazey (Republican), 8
Virginia	William Mahone	Readjuster	1881	Incumbent lost re-election. New senator elected in 1887. Democratic gain.	▌ ✓ John W. Daniel (Democratic); [data missing]
West Virginia	Johnson N. Camden	Democratic	1880–81	Incumbent lost renomination. Legislature failed to elect. Democratic loss. A new senator was elected late; see below.	▌Johnson N. Camden (Democratic)
Wisconsin	Philetus Sawyer	Republican	1881	Incumbent re-elected January 26, 1887.	▌ ✓ Philetus Sawyer (Republican) 65.6%; ▌John Winans (Democratic) 29.6%; ▌John Cochrane (Labor) 4.8%

=== Elections during the 50th Congress ===
In these elections, the winners were elected in 1887 after March 4; ordered by date.

State	Incumbent			Results	Candidates
State	Senator	Party	Electoral history	Results	Candidates
West Virginia (Class 1)	Vacant			Legislature had failed to elect; see above. New senator elected late May 5, 1887. Democratic gain.	▌ ✓ Charles J. Faulkner (Democratic) 48; ▌Flick (Republican) 31; ▌Barbee (Greenback) 6; ▌[FNU] Whittaker (Unknown) 2; ▌Johnson N. Camden (Democratic) 1; ▌B. S. Brown (Unknown) 1
Florida (Class 1)	Vacant			Legislature had failed to elect; see above. New senator elected late May 19, 1887. Democratic gain.	▌ ✓ Samuel Pasco (Democratic); [data missing]
New Hampshire (Class 2)	Person C. Cheney	Republican	1886 (appointed)	Interim appointee retired when successor elected. New senator elected June 14, 1887. Republican hold.	▌ ✓ William E. Chandler (Republican); [data missing]
Virginia (Class 2)	Harrison H. Riddleberger	Readjuster	1881	Incumbent retired. New senator elected early December 20, 1887 for the term beginning in 1889. Democratic gain.	▌ ✓ John S. Barbour Jr. (Democratic); [data missing]

== Maryland ==
1886 United States Senate election in Maryland
- 1886

80 members of the Maryland General Assembly
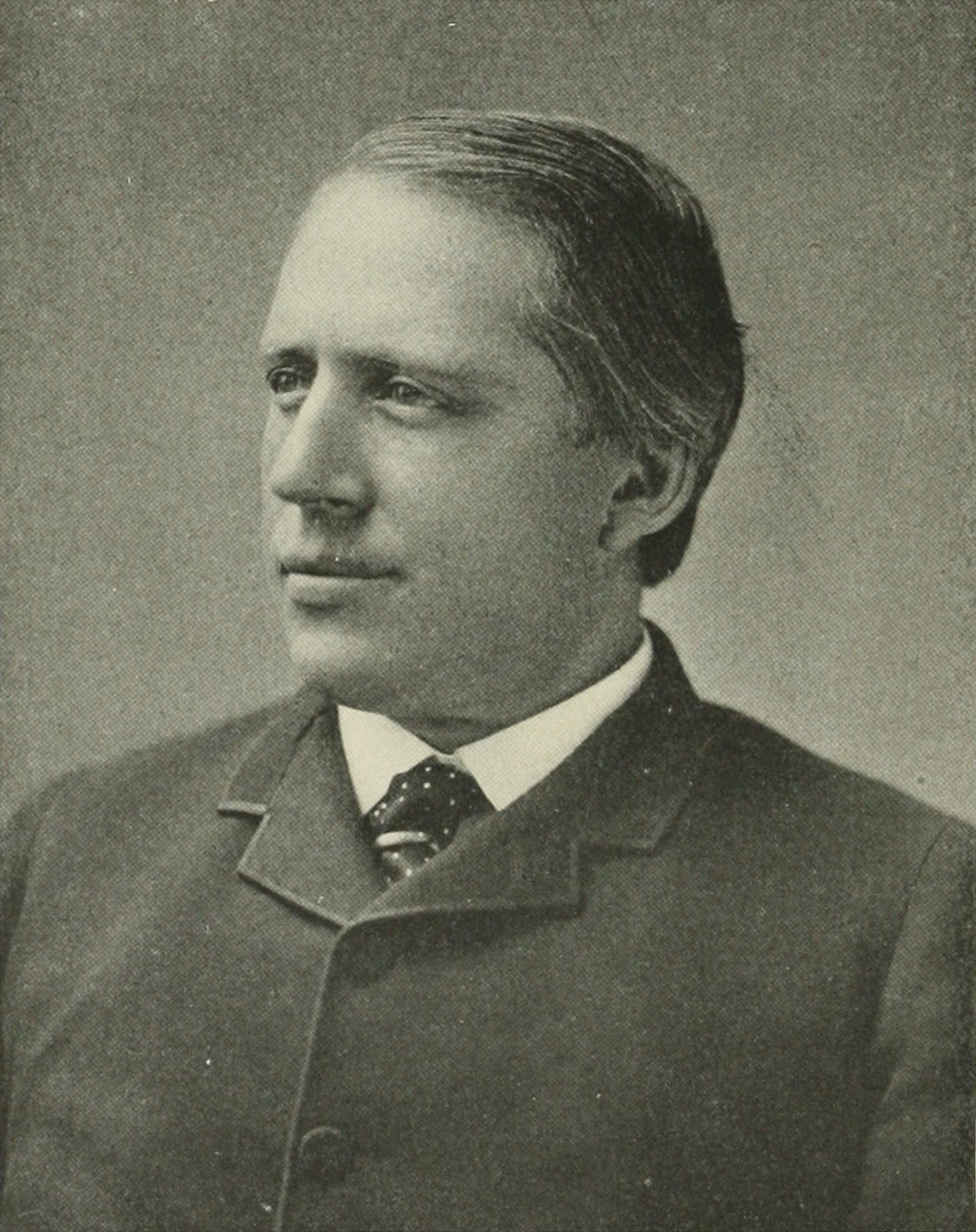
Candidate	Arthur Pue Gorman
Party	Democratic
Legislative vote	-
Percentage	-%

Arthur Pue Gorman won re-election for an unknown margin of votes for the Class 1 seat.

== New York ==
The election in New York was held from January 18 to 20, 1887. Republican Warner Miller had been elected to this seat in a special election in 1881 to succeed Thomas C. Platt who had resigned. Miller's term would expire on March 3, 1887. At the State election in November 1885, 20 Republicans and 12 Democrats were elected for a two-year term (1886–1887) in the State Senate. At the State election in November 1886, 74 Republicans and 54 Democrats were elected for the session of 1887 to the Assembly. The 110th New York State Legislature met from January 4 to May 26, 1887, at Albany, New York.

The caucus of Republican State legislators met on January 17, President pro tempore of the State Senate Edmund L. Pitts presided. 20 State senators and 71 assemblymen attended. Ex-Speaker of the Assembly George Z. Erwin (a Morton man) moved that a majority of all Republican legislators should be necessary to nominate, not only a majority of those present, meaning that 48 votes were required instead of 46, which was carried by a vote of 52 to 39. The incumbent U.S. senator Warner Miller (Half-Breed faction) failed to be nominated by only four votes. Levi P. Morton (Stalwart faction) was rejected by the caucus, like in 1885. A small faction voted for Congressman Frank Hiscock. After the second ballot, Erwin moved to adjourn, which was carried by 48 to 43. The caucus met again on the next day, no choice was made in another two ballots. The caucus met again on January 19 after the joint ballot of the State Legislature, and after twelve more ballots, Erwin withdrew Morton's name and urged the Morton men to vote for Hiscock. On the next ballot Hiscock received one vote more than Miller (47 to 46), but was one short of the previously established majority of 48. On the 18th and last ballot, Hiscock received 50 votes and was nominated. On the next day, Hiscock was elected on the second joint ballot of the State Legislature. Thus, by blocking Miller's re-election, the Republican boss Thomas C. Platt took his revenge for his defeat at the special election in 1881.

1887 Republican caucus for United States senator
Ballot	Date	Warner Miller	Levi P. Morton	√ Frank Hiscock
1st	January 17	44	35	12
2nd	January 17	44	36	11
3rd	January 18			
4th	January 18			
5th	January 19	46	36	11
6th	January 19	46	36	11
7th	January 19	46	36	11
8th	January 19	46	36	11
9th	January 19	46	36	11
10th	January 19	46	36	11
11th	January 19	46	36	11
12th	January 19	46	36	11
13th	January 19	46	36	11
14th	January 19	46	36	11
15th	January 19	46	36	11
16th	January 19	46	36	11
17th	January 19	46	Withdrew	47
18th	January 19	43		50

The Democratic caucus nominated Smith Mead Weed (1834–1920), a lawyer and businessman of Plattsburgh, New York. Weed had been a member of the New York State Assembly from Clinton County, New York in 1865, 1866, 1867, 1871, 1873 and 1874; and a delegate to the 1876 and 1884 Democratic National Conventions.

1887 regular election for United States senator
House	Democratic		Republican		Republican		Republican	
State Senate (32 members); January 18	Smith M. Weed	11	Warner Miller	10	Levi P. Morton	9	Frank Hiscock	1
State Assembly (128 members); January 18	Smith M. Weed	41	Warner Miller	32	Levi P. Morton	26	Frank Hiscock	10
Joint ballot (160 members); January 19	Smith M. Weed	61	Warner Miller	43	Levi P. Morton	33	Frank Hiscock	11
Second joint ballot (160 members); January 20	Smith M. Weed	62					√ Frank Hiscock	91

== Pennsylvania ==
The election in Pennsylvania was held January 18, 1887. Matthew Quay was elected by the Pennsylvania General Assembly to the United States Senate. The General Assembly, consisting of the House of Representatives and Senate voted as follows:

State Legislature Results
Party	Candidate	Votes	%
Republican	Matthew Quay	165	65.74
Democratic	Simon P. Wolverton	80	31.87
N/A	Not voting	6	2.39
Totals		251	100.00%

== See also ==
- 1886 United States elections
  - 1886 United States House of Representatives elections
- 49th United States Congress
- 50th United States Congress
