= 1887 United States Senate election in New York =

- January 18–20, 1887
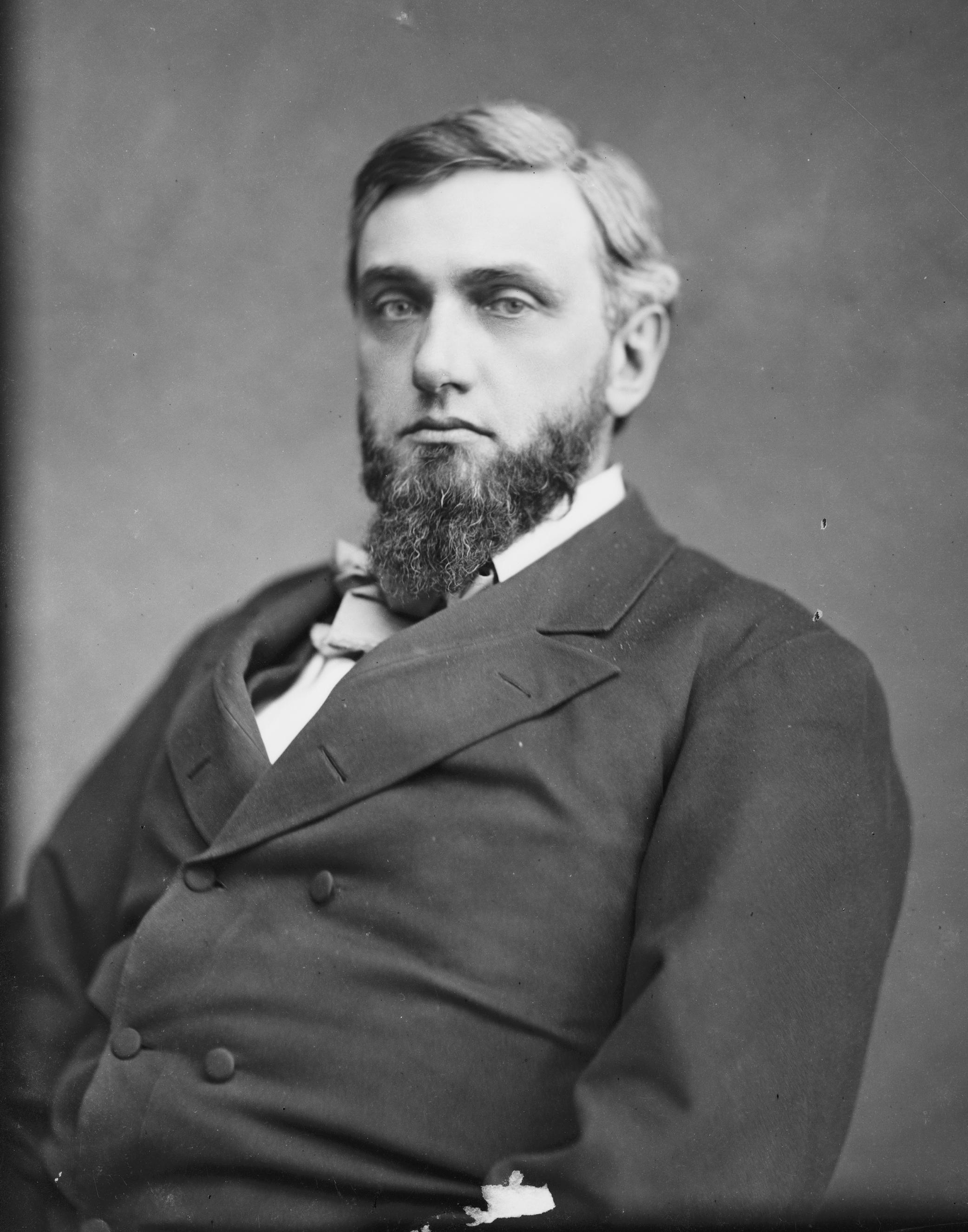

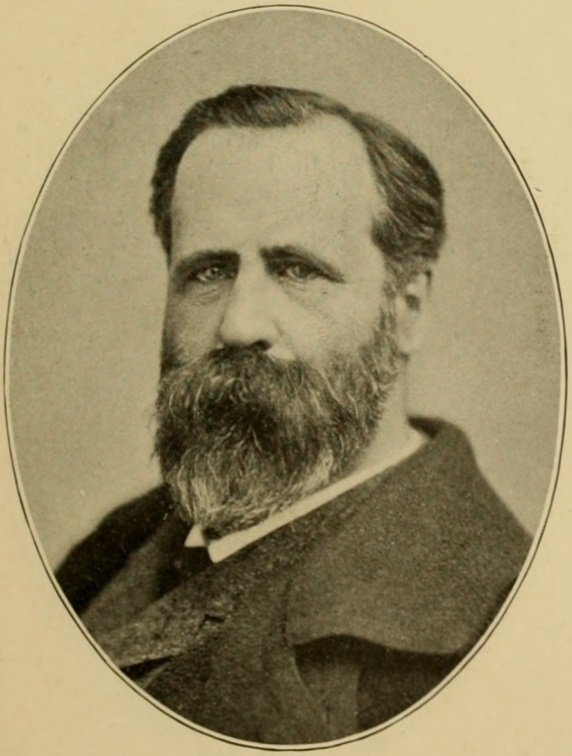
Nominee	Frank Hiscock	Smith Mead Weed
Party	Republican	Democratic
Electoral vote	91	62
Percentage	59.48%	40.52%
U.S. Senators before election
Warner Miller
Republican
Elected U.S. Senators
Frank Hiscock
Republican

The 1887 United States Senate election in New York was held from January 18 to 20, 1887, by the New York State Legislature to elect a U.S. senator (Class 1) to represent the State of New York in the United States Senate. Incumbent Republican Senator Warner Miller was not renominated by the Republican legislative caucus and was succeeded by Frank Hiscock.

== Background ==
Republican Warner Miller had been elected to this seat in a special election in 1881 to succeed Thomas C. Platt who had resigned. Miller's term would expire on March 3, 1887.

At the State election in November 1885, 20 Republicans and 12 Democrats were elected for a two-year term (1886–1887) in the State Senate. At the State election in November 1886, 74 Republicans and 54 Democrats were elected for the session of 1887 to the Assembly. The 110th New York State Legislature met from January 4 to May 26, 1887, at Albany, New York.

== Republican caucus ==
=== Candidates ===
- Frank Hiscock, U.S. Representative from Syracuse
- Warner Miller, incumbent Senator since 1881
- Levi P. Morton, former U.S. Minister to France (1881–85), U.S. Representative from New York City (1879–81), (Note: From 1874–95, New York City consisted of the island of Manhattan and the West Bronx. Morton represented a district surrounding Central Park.) and candidate for Senate in 1885

=== Results ===
The caucus of Republican State legislators met on January 17, President pro tempore of the State Senate Edmund L. Pitts presided. 20 State senators and 71 assemblymen attended. Ex-Speaker of the Assembly George Z. Erwin (a Morton man) moved that a majority of all Republican legislators should be necessary to nominate, not only a majority of those present, meaning that 48 votes were required instead of 46, which was carried by a vote of 52 to 39. The incumbent U.S. Senator Warner Miller (Half-Breed faction) failed to be nominated by only four votes. Levi P. Morton (Stalwart faction) was rejected by the caucus, as in 1885. A small faction voted for Congressman Frank Hiscock. After the second ballot, Erwin moved to adjourn, which was carried by 48 to 43. The caucus met again on the next day, no choice was made in another two ballots. The caucus met again on January 19 after the joint ballot of the State Legislature, and after twelve more ballots, Erwin withdrew Morton's name and urged the Morton men to vote for Hiscock. On the next ballot Hiscock received one vote more than Miller (47 to 46), but was one short of the previously established majority of 48. On the 18th and last ballot, Hiscock received 50 votes and was nominated. On the next day, Hiscock was elected on the second joint ballot of the State Legislature. Thus, by blocking Miller's re-election, the Republican boss Thomas C. Platt took his revenge for his defeat at the special election in 1881.

1887 Republican caucus for United States Senator
Ballot	Date	Warner Miller	Levi P. Morton	√ Frank Hiscock
1st	January 17	44	35	12
2nd	January 17	44	36	11
3rd	January 18			
4th	January 18			
5th	January 19	46	36	11
6th	January 19	46	36	11
7th	January 19	46	36	11
8th	January 19	46	36	11
9th	January 19	46	36	11
10th	January 19	46	36	11
11th	January 19	46	36	11
12th	January 19	46	36	11
13th	January 19	46	36	11
14th	January 19	46	36	11
15th	January 19	46	36	11
16th	January 19	46	36	11
17th	January 19	46	Withdrew	47
18th	January 19	43		50

== Democratic caucus ==
The Democratic caucus nominated Smith Mead Weed (1834–1920), a lawyer and businessman of Plattsburgh, New York. Weed had been a member of the New York State Assembly from Clinton County, New York in 1865, 1866, 1867, 1871, 1873 and 1874; and a delegate to the 1876 and 1884 Democratic National Conventions.

== General election ==
House	Democrat		Republican		Republican		Republican	
State Senate (32 members); January 18	Smith M. Weed	11	Warner Miller	10	Levi P. Morton	9	Frank Hiscock	1
State Assembly (128 members); January 18	Smith M. Weed	41	Warner Miller	32	Levi P. Morton	26	Frank Hiscock	10
Joint ballot (160 members); January 19	Smith M. Weed	61	Warner Miller	43	Levi P. Morton	33	Frank Hiscock	11
Second joint ballot (160 members); January 20	Smith M. Weed	62					√ Frank Hiscock	91

== Aftermath ==
Hiscock served a single term, and remained in office until March 3, 1893. In January 1893, Hiscock was defeated for re-election by Democrat Edward Murphy Jr.

== See also ==
- 1886 and 1887 United States Senate elections

== Sources ==
- "Members of the 50th United States Congress" (PDF). U.S. Government Printing Office. Archived from the original (PDF) on January 6, 2010.
- "MILLER LEADS IN CAUCUS; BUT WANTS FOUR VOTES OF A NOMINATING MAJORITY" (PDF). The New York Times. January 18, 1887.
- "'HISCOCK WINS THE PRIZE; MORTON WITHDRAWN FROM THE SENATORIAL FIGHT" (PDF). The New York Times. January 20, 1887.
- "MR. HISCOCK'S ELECTION" (PDF). The New York Times. January 21, 1887.
- "Smith M. Weed Dies in Plattsburgh" (PDF). The New York Times. June 8, 1920.
