= 1905 United States Senate election in New York =

- January 17, 1905

Majority vote of each house needed to win
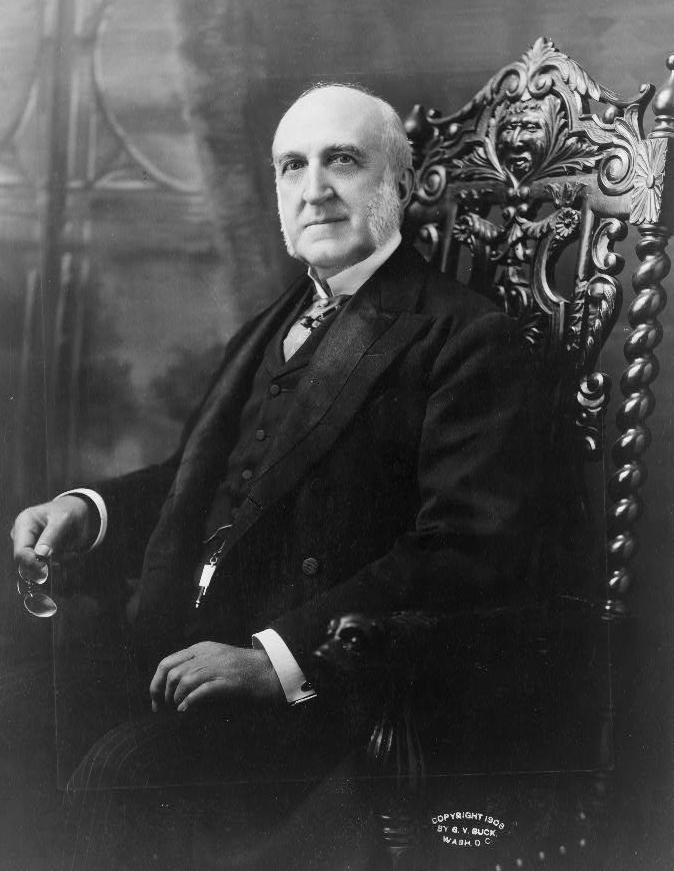

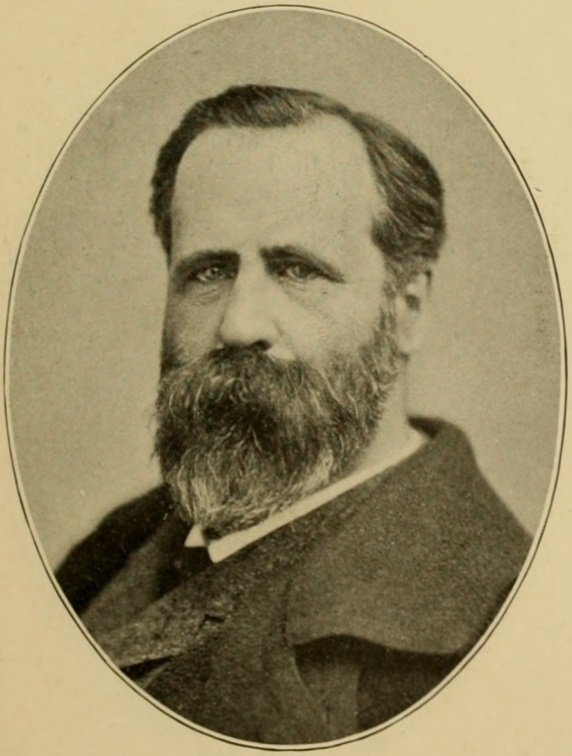
Nominee	Chauncey Depew	Smith M. Weed
Party	Republican	Democratic
Senate	36	13
Percentage	73.47%	26.53%
House	100	44
Percentage	69.44%	30.55%
Senator before election
Chauncey Depew
Republican
Elected Senator
Chauncey Depew
Republican

The 1905 United States Senate election in New York was held on January 17, 1905. Incumbent Senator Chauncey Depew was re-elected to a second term in office. He was renominated unanimously after former Governor Frank S. Black dropped his challenge, and easily won the election given the Republican Party's large majorities in both houses.

== Background ==
Republican Chauncey M. Depew had been elected to this seat in 1899, and his term would expire on March 3, 1905.

At the State election in November 1904, large Republican majorities were elected for a two-year term (1905–1906) in the State Senate, and for the session of 1905 to the Assembly. The 128th State Legislature met from January 3, 1905, on at Albany, New York.

== Candidates ==
=== Republican caucus ===
Late in 1904, Ex-Governor Frank S. Black tried to be nominated to succeed Depew. Black was supported by Governor Benjamin B. Odell Jr., but after intense fighting behind the scenes, Odell finally dropped Black and accepted Depew's re-election which had been supported by his fellow Senator Thomas C. Platt and Speaker S. Frederick Nixon.

The Republican caucus met on January 16. They re-nominated the incumbent U.S. Senator Chauncey M. Depew unanimously.

=== Democratic caucus ===
The Democratic caucus met also on January 16. They nominated again Smith M. Weed who had been the candidate of the Democratic minority in the U.S. Senate election of 1887.

1905 Democratic caucus for United States Senator result
Candidate	First ballot
√ Smith M. Weed	42
D-Cady Herrick	14

== Result ==
Chauncey M. Depew was the choice of both the Assembly and the State Senate, and was declared elected.

1905 United States Senator election result
Office	House	Republican		Democrat
State Senate (50 members)	√ Chauncey M. Depew	36	Smith M. Weed	13
State Assembly (150 members)	√ Chauncey M. Depew	100	Smith M. Weed	44

Note: The votes were cast on January 17, but both Houses met in a joint session on January 18 to compare nominations, and declare the result.

== Aftermath ==
Depew remained in the U.S. Senate until March 3, 1911. In 1911, Depew was defeated for re-election by Democrat James A. O'Gorman after a deadlock of two months and a half.

== Sources ==
- Members of the 59th United States Congress
- "BLACK AND DEPEW SEE ODELL ON SENATORSHIP" (PDF). The New York Times. November 23, 1904.
- "ODELL FOR BLACK; OPEN WAR BEGINS" (PDF). The New York Times. December 16, 1904.
- "BLACK NOW A CANDIDATE, HIS ORGAN DECLARES" (PDF). The New York Times. December 18, 1904.
- "ODELL YIELDS TO DEPEW; SENATORSHIP FIGHT ENDS" (PDF). The New York Times. December 30, 1904.
- "DEPEW NAMED FOR SENATOR.; ...S.M. Weed Democratic Nominee" (PDF). The New York Times. January 17, 1905.
- "ANOTHER TERM FOR DEPEW" (PDF). The New York Times. January 18, 1905.
