= 1881 United States Senate special elections in New York =

1881 United States Senate elections in New York
- May 31—July 22, 1881
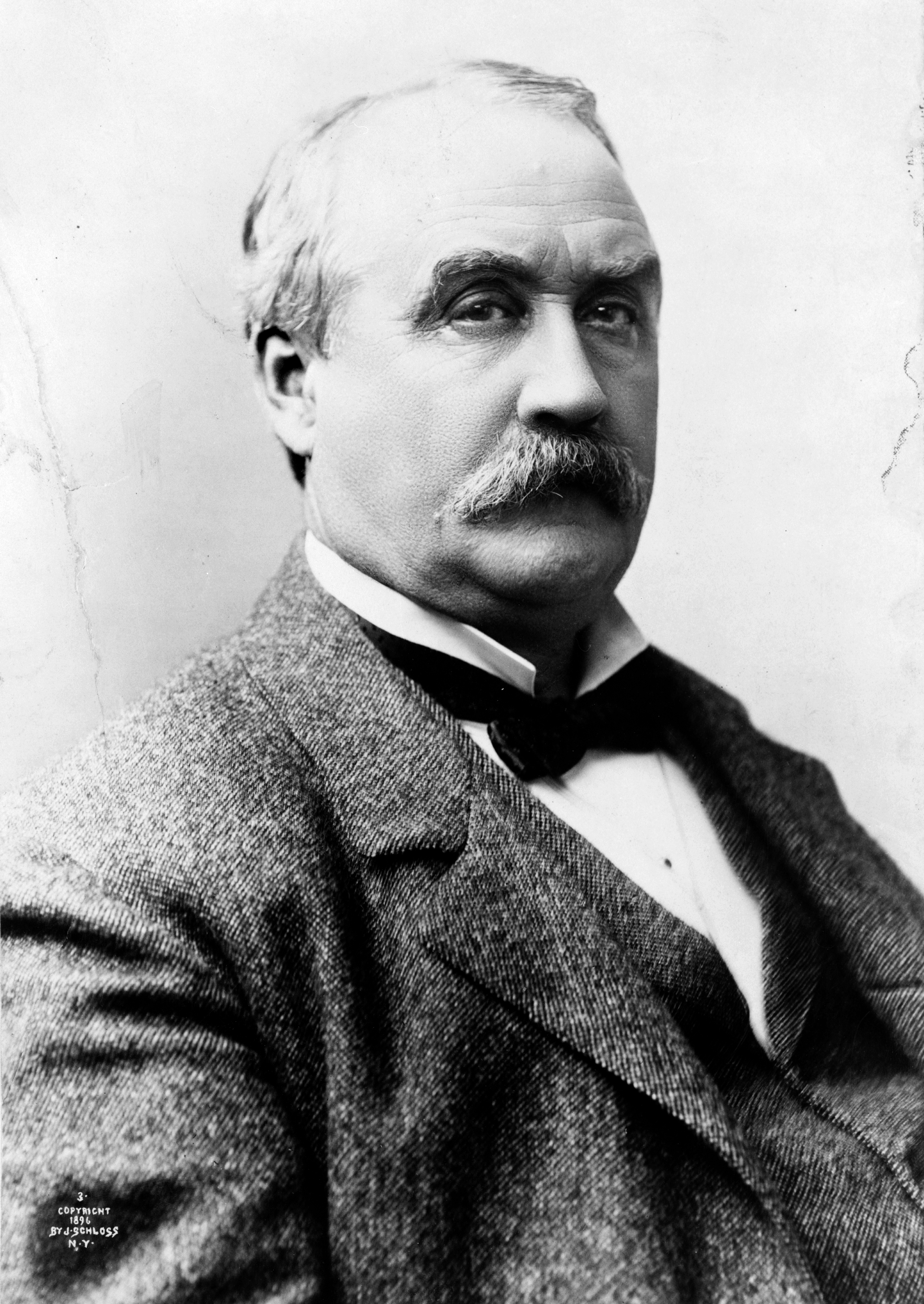

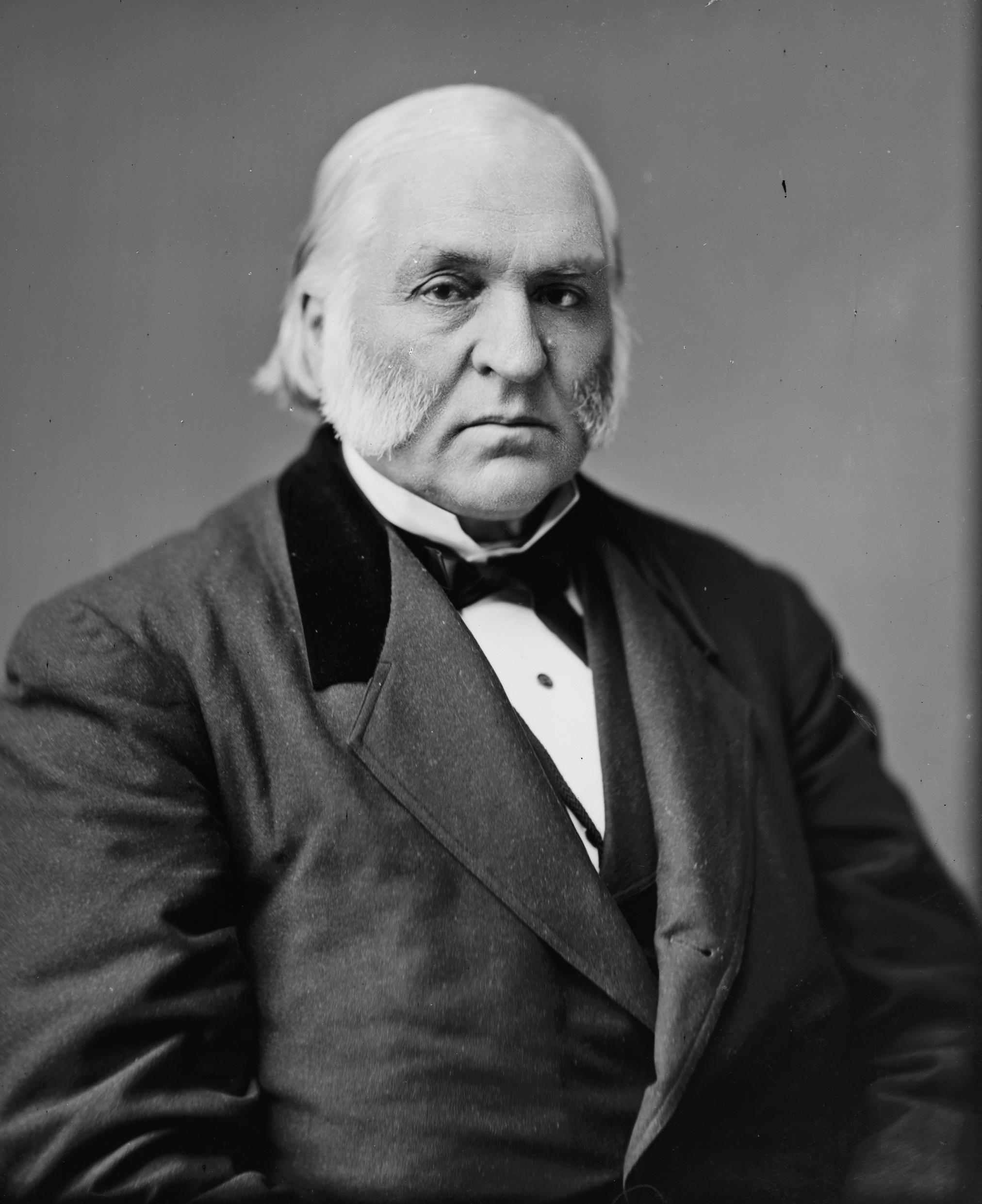
Nominee	Warner Miller; Class I	Elbridge Lapham; Class III
Party	Republican	Republican
U.S. Senators before election
Thomas C. Platt (Class I)
Roscoe Conkling (Class III)
Republican
Elected U.S. Senators
Warner Miller (Class I)
Elbridge Lapham (Class III)
Republican

The 1881 United States Senate special elections in New York were held from May 31 to July 22 by the New York State Legislature to elect two U.S. senators to represent New York in the United States Senate, following the joint resignations of Roscoe Conkling and Thomas C. Platt during an ongoing political dispute with President James A. Garfield over control of federal patronage in the state.

The resignations were intended to trigger the reelection of each senator to affirm the popularity and political strength of the Stalwart faction of the Republican Party. Instead, the legislature demurred for 52 days before ultimately electing Warner Miller and Elbridge Lapham. During the course of the elections, Garfield was shot by Charles Guiteau, a deranged office-seeker angered over his failure to receive a federal appointment; Garfield died two months after balloting concluded.

On July 1, Platt withdrew after 41 inconclusive joint ballots. On July 2, Garfield was shot by Guiteau, who declared his support for Conkling immediately after the shooting. With no consensus candidate emerging for either seat, a Republican caucus met on July 8 to nominate replacements and settled on Warner Miller and Elbridge Lapham. Two weeks later, Miller was elected to Platt's seat. Conkling's supporters held out for another week before acquiescing to the unanimous nomination of Lapham on July 22, ending the election.

President Garfield died on September 19. With the Stalwart faction effectively eliminated by Conkling's removal from office, Congress passed the Pendleton Civil Service Reform Act, which was signed into law by Chester A. Arthur, a former Conkling protégé.

== Background ==
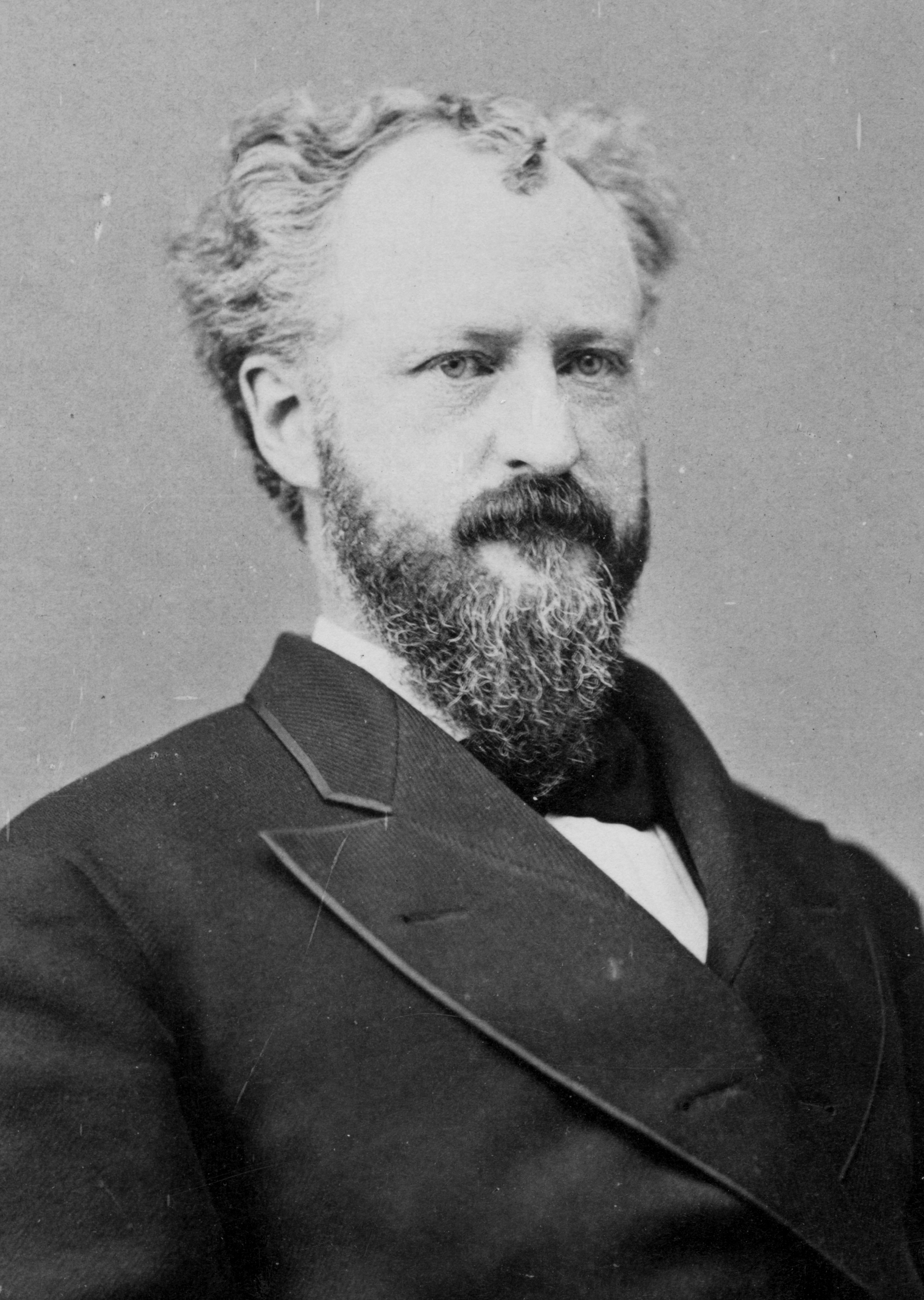
Roscoe Conkling, senator since 1867

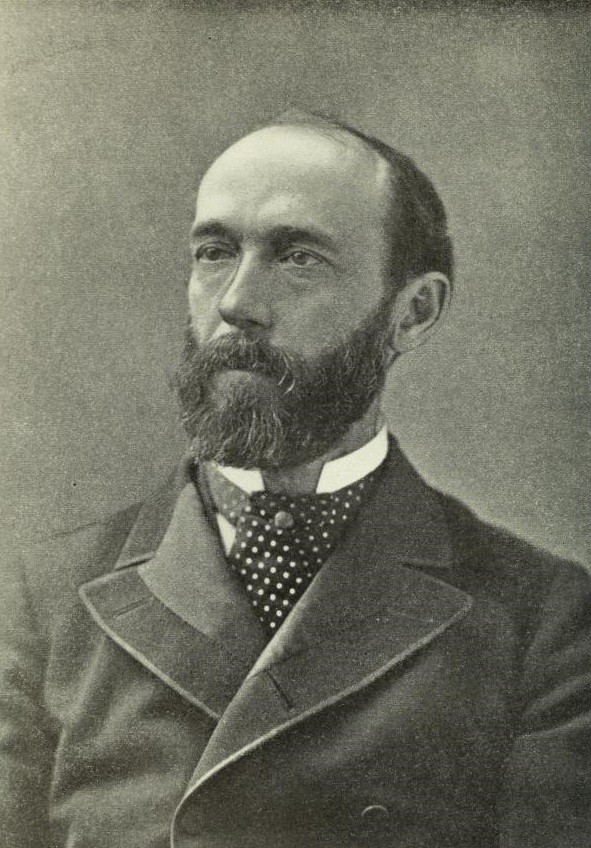
Thomas Collier Platt, senator since January 1881

Roscoe Conkling, the Republican Party boss and leader of the Stalwart faction, was elected to a third term in as the Class 3 United States Senator in January 1879. During his time in office, Conkling had built a powerful political organization through control of federal patronage appointments, particularly the offices in the lucrative Port of New York. At the 1876 Republican National Convention, he had been the favorite son of the New York delegation, where he led opposition to the nomination of his political rival, James G. Blaine. After a deadlock, the convention nominated Rutherford B. Hayes. Although Hayes opposed Conkling's influence over New York by nominating Theodore Roosevelt Sr. as collector of the port, Conkling and his allies in the Senate successfully blocked the nomination in December 1877.

At the 1880 Republican National Convention, Conkling again opposed Blaine's nomination by supporting former president Ulysses S. Grant for a third term in office. When the convention deadlocked again, the delegates nominated dark horse James A. Garfield of Ohio as a compromise candidate. To appease the Stalwarts, Port of New York collector Chester A. Arthur was nominated as his vice presidential running mate. Garfield, who had campaigned on a moderate civil service reform plank, won the election.

Thomas C. Platt had been elected on Conkling's advice in January 1881 and had just taken his seat as the state's junior senator on March 4. However, Platt only won 54 of the 105 votes in the Republican caucus, demonstrating waning support for Conkling's machine.

=== Robertson nomination ===
Garfield nominated William H. Robertson, the president pro tempore of the New York State Senate and leader of the state's Half-Breed faction, as Collector of the Port of New York. Robertson, who had been elected as a delegate to the 1880 convention on a pledge to vote for Grant, was among the New York delegates who broke with Conkling to engineer Garfield's nomination.

On March 28, Conkling, Platt, Arthur, and postmaster general Thomas Lemuel James sent a public letter to Garfield urging him to withdraw Robertson's nomination. Conkling preferred that Edwin Merritt continue as collector until his term expired in 1882, at which point Conkling would recommend a Stalwart to succeed him.

On May 16, both Conkling and Platt resigned in protest against the distribution of federal patronage in New York. Conkling and Platt then stood for re-election in an effort to rebuke Garfield and demonstrate their political support within New York.

=== Legislative composition ===
At the 1879 state election, 25 Republicans and 7 Democrats were elected for a two-year term (1880–1881) in the State Senate.

At the 1880 state election, 81 Republicans and 47 Democrats were elected for the session of 1881 to the Assembly.

The 104th New York State Legislature met from January 4 to July 23, 1881, at Albany, New York.

== Nominations ==
=== Republican caucus ===
When the first surprise about the resignations subsided, a majority of the Republican State legislators were determined to be rid of Conkling. Intense canvassing followed, many names were speculated about as candidates, but it proved difficult to call a caucus, since no majority of legislators or of the caucus committee agreed.

A caucus of Republican State legislators was finally called by Speaker of the Assembly George H. Sharpe for May 30. Assemblyman Andrew S. Draper presided, and secretaries were appointed. Only 8 State senators and 27 assemblymen were present, and the caucus adjourned for lack of quorum until the next day, but nobody was nominated.

=== Democratic caucus ===
The caucus of the Democratic State legislators met on May 30. Assemblyman Michael C. Murphy, of New York City, presided. They nominated Ex-U.S. Senator Francis Kernan and State Senator John C. Jacobs, both on the first ballot.

May 1881 Democratic caucus for United States Senator result
Office	Candidate	First ballot	Office	Candidate	First ballot
U.S. Senator (Class 1)	Francis Kernan	34	U.S. Senator (Class 3)	John C. Jacobs	39
	Clarkson N. Potter	7		Abram S. Hewitt	8
	Rufus W. Peckham	5		Horatio Seymour	4
	Erastus Corning	3		Clarkson N. Potter	1
	Horatio Seymour	1			

== Elections ==
On May 31, the legally prescribed day for the election, the Assembly and the State Senate took a ballot, but no candidate received a majority. On June 1, both Houses met in joint session, compared the result of the ballot, and finding that nobody had received a majority in either House, proceeded to a joint ballot in which nobody received a majority either. Afterwards, Stalwarts and Administration men met in separate conferences. The Stalwarts hung on to Conkling and Platt. At the Administration men's conference 61 State legislators were present and Chauncey M. Depew was the frontrunner for the long term (Class 1), but the anti-Conkling men were split into a handful of factions, unable to compromise. From June 2 on, joint ballots were taken every day, Monday through Saturday at noon.

After almost three weeks of deadlock, it was believed that Governor Cornell would consider the votes cast for State Senator Jacobs as void, and to accept as elected any Republican candidate who would receive a simple majority of a quorum, meaning that if at least 81 votes were cast for all candidates except Jacobs, the frontrunner would be elected with 42. On this day, 155 legislators present, and 52 voting for Jacobs, somebody could claim to be elected with a vote of 52, and get his credentials issued by the governor. Thus, when Ex-Vice President Wheeler had received 50 votes in the 23rd ballot, State Senator Charles A. Fowler (Dem., 14th D.) withdrew Jacobs's name before the end of the roll call, and the Democratic members who had voted already (the roll was called in alphabetical order of surnames, first Senate, then Assembly) asked to change their votes, which was granted by Lt. Gov. George G. Hoskins.

After Jacobs's withdrawal during the 23rd ballot, a Democratic caucus was held in the afternoon of June 22, Assemblyman Michael C. Murphy presided. Ex-Congressman Clarkson N. Potter was nominated after an informal ballot, in which votes were scattered about 11 candidates, and a formal ballot in which Potter received a majority.

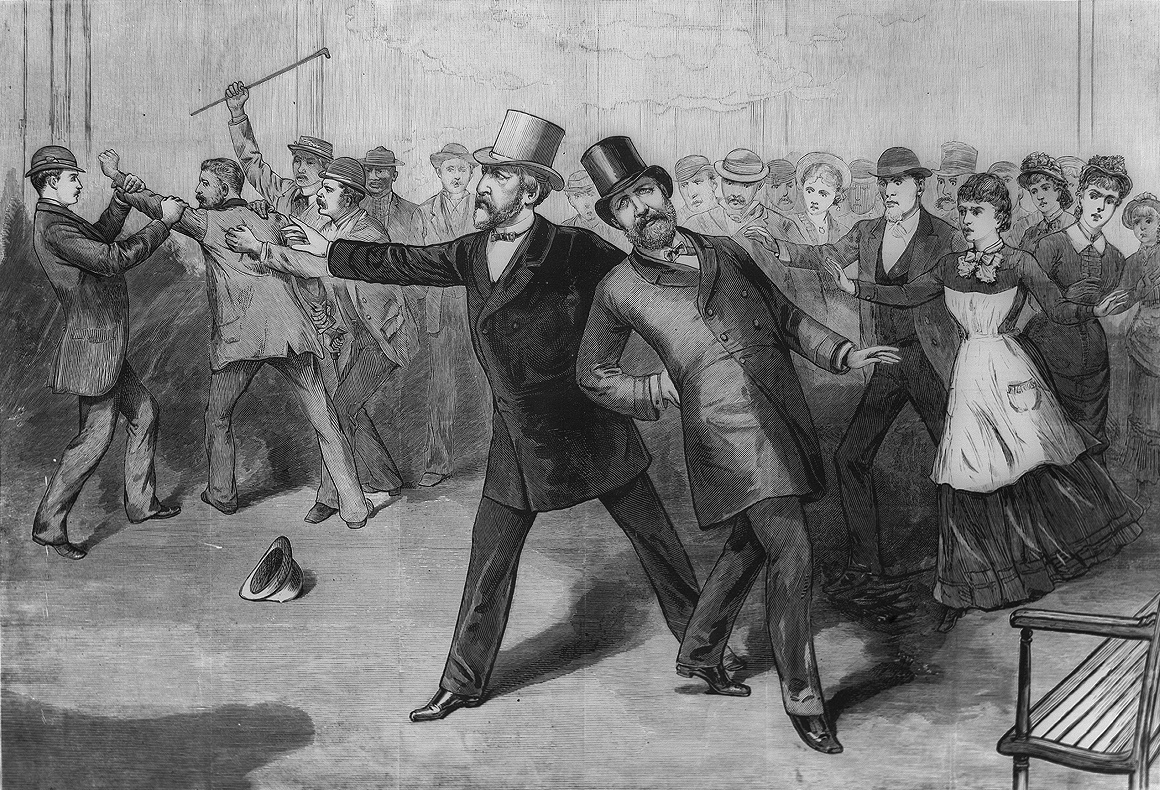
President James A. Garfield, on whom Conkling's opposition was centered, was shot in Washington on July 2; news arrived in Albany just after Platt withdrew and just before the 33rd ballot.

After a month of deadlock and 31 ballots, Thomas C. Platt withdrew from the contest on July 1, and most of the Platt men then switched to Richard Crowley. On the morning of the next day, President Garfield was shot and the news arrived in Albany just before the State Legislature met for the 33rd ballot.

On July 6, after the 37th ballot, the Anti-Conkling men met in conference. 59 legislators attended, and State Senator Dennis McCarthy presided. No agreement was reached, and a call was issued for a new conference to be held the next day. On July 7, after the 39th ballot, the Anti-Conkling conference was attended by 65 legislators, and a call for a regular Republican caucus was signed by 59 of them. On July 8, after the 41st ballot, a regular Republican caucus finally met. 64 legislators answered to the first roll call, and Thomas G. Alvord was chosen chairman. Since the Stalwarts were not attending, it was agreed that nominations were to be made with a minimum vote of 54, a majority of the total 106 Republican legislators. The frontrunner to succeed Platt (Class 1 seat), Chauncey M. Depew, withdrew from the contest for the sake of party unity, and the caucus instead nominated Congressman Warner Miller on the fifth ballot (First ballot: Miller 27, William A. Wheeler 22, Sherman S. Rogers 9, Noah Davis 2, Alonzo B. Cornell 2, William M. Evarts 2, Richard Crowley 1, Roscoe Conkling 1, Henry E. Temain 1; Second ballot: Miller 28, Wheeler 28, Rogers 10; Third ballot: similar to second; Fourth ballot: Miller 32 then withdrawal of Rogers, then many changes, then withdrawal of Wheeler; Fifth ballot: Miller unanimously). Then they nominated on the second ballot Congressman Elbridge G. Lapham to succeed Conkling (First ballot: Lapham 38, Cornell 12, Tremain 10, Crowley 5, James W. Wadsworth 1; Second ballot: Most votes for Lapham, then some changes, then a re-call of the roll, and finally unanimously). The Conkling men however refused to accept the caucus nominations and continued to vote for Conkling, and now for Wheeler instead of Crowley to succeed Platt. On July 11, after the 43rd ballot, the Stalwarts demanded a new caucus but the Chairman of the State Senate Caucus Committee Dennis McCarthy refused to issue a call.

On July 16, after seven weeks of deadlock, Warner Miller was elected on the 48th ballot to succeed Platt. Conkling held out for another week. On July 22, after the 55th ballot, the Republican legislators met in conference. 76 legislators attended, State Senator Dennis McCarthy presided, and this conference issued the call for a caucus to meet at 3 p.m. The caucus was attended by Stalwarts and Administration men, all Republican legislators who had voted on the previous ballot being present. They nominated Elbridge G. Lapham on the first ballot (vote: Lapham 61, Conkling 28, Stewart L. Woodford 1, William M. Evarts 1), and the nomination was then "made unanimous." At 5 p.m. another ballot, the 56th and last, was taken by the State Legislature, and Lapham was elected to succeed Conkling.

=== Class 1 summary ===
1881 United States Senator (Class 1) special election result
Candidate	S	A	J1	2	3	4	5	6	7	8	9	10	11	12	13	14	15	16	17	18	J9	20	21	22	23	24	25	26	27	28	29	30	31	32	33	34	35	36	37	38	39	40	41	42	43	44	45	46	47	48
▌ Miller	2	3	8	8	1	10	8	9																																				68	61	70	71	73	74	76
▌ Platt	8	21	29	28	28	30	26	23	28	29	29	28	28	22	21	26	27	27	23	17	21	27	27	26	25	27	27	27	20	21	27	28	28	2	1	1	1	1												
▌ Kernan	7	47	53	53	53	51	31	26	46	51	50	48	48	29	27	51	50	52	48	34	25	51	51	53	53	53	53	45	31	32	49	52	53	48	31	24	47	47	53	51	52	50	50	50	48	52	51	54	53	47
▌ Depew	7	14	25	28	30	30	23	21	42	51	53	54	54	38	36	55	54	54	53	44	37	52	50	52	50	53	52	45	34	35	50	50	51	48	35	32	48	48	53	51	49	51	51							
▌ Cornell		12	11	11	13	13	8	9	14	10	8	9	9	7	6	10	10	12	10	5	6	11	9	8	8	8	7	7	5	4	9	9	11	15	10	11	15	15	18	18	17	20	19	1						
▌ Lapham	2	6	8	8	9	2	2	4	4	4	3	3	2	2	2	2	1	1	1	1			1	3	4	4	3	3	2	1	3	2	2	1	2	1	1	1	1	1	1	1	1							
▌ Crowley		3	4	4	4	3	3	3	4	4	5	4	4	2	3	4	3	5	5	3	3	6	5	7	8	8	6	5	4	5	6	7	7	20	9	10	19	19	19	18	18	18	18							
▌ Folger		6	5	3	4	3	3	3	4	4	4	3	3	3	3	3	3	2			1	1	1																											
▌ Wheeler	1					1	1		1									1	2	1		3	4	3	2	1					1	1	1				2	2	2	2	2	1	1	19	18	21	23	12	7	4
▌ Evarts		5	3	1																																1	1	1	1	1	1	1			1	1	1	2	1	
▌ Davis	2		2																																															
▌ Wadsworth		2	2	2	2																																													
▌ Tremain		2	1		1	3	3		2	1	1											1	1	1	1	5	1	1	1		1	1	1		1		1	1	1	1	1	1	1							
▌ Morton		2	1																																															
▌ Rogers	1	1	1		1												1							1																				4	3					
▌ Choate	1	1																																																
▌ Sharpe	1																																																	
▌ Francis		1																																																
▌ Pomeroy		1																																																
▌ Ward			3	3	4	2																																												
▌ Dutcher			2	2	2	2	2																																											
▌ Van Cott				1	1	1	1	1																												1														
▌ Rumsey				1	1																																													
▌ Sloan				1																																														
▌ Wilber					1																																													
▌ Fenton							1	1	1																																									
▌ Tracy										1							1	1																																
▌ Bliss																						1	1	1	1																									
▌ Hoskins																											5	4		3	1													1		1		1	1	1
▌ Chapman																																		4	1		3	3	4	4	4	4	4	2	2	2	2	2	2	2
▌ North																																		1	1	1	1	1	1	1	1	1	1							
▌ Adams																																		1		1								3	2	2	1	2	2	1
▌ Daniels																																		1			1	1	1	1	1	1	1			3	2	3	3	1
▌ Talcott																																			2								1							1
▌ Fish																																			1	1	1	1	1	1	1	1	1		2	2	2	7	11	9
▌ Starin																																												1	1	1	1	1	2	2
▌ Tenney																																																	1	1

=== Class 3 summary ===
1881 United States Senator (Class 3) special election result
Candidate	S	A	J1	2	3	4	5	6	7	8	9	10	11	12	13	14	15	16	17	18	19	20	21	22	23	24	25	26	27	28	29	30	31	32	33	34	35	36	37	38	39	40	41	42	43	44	45	46	47	48	49	50	51	52	53	54	55	56
▌Lapham				1	1	7	4	3	8	9	9	8	11	7	6	8	10	12	16	13	16	25	25	26	16	17	17	13	10	8	17	18	17	13	7	6	9	9	11	11	11	12	12	67	60	68	69	70	70	68	54	54	68	72	72	67	63	92
▌Conkling	9	26	35	34	33	34	30	26	34	34	34	33	33	23	24	31	31	32	27	20	23	33	32	32	32	32	32	30	22	24	31	32	32	28	20	16	31	31	32	31	30	32	32	31	28	32	32	32	32	29	27	27	28	28	28	28	28	
▌Jacobs	6	47	52	52	52	49	30	25	45	50	49	47	47	29	26	50	49	51	47	34	24	50	50	52	12																																	
▌Potter																									7	53	53	44	34	31	49	52	53	48	31	27	47	47	53	51	52	50	50	50	48	52	52	54	53	47	34	34	45	49	49	45	40	42
▌Wheeler	4	15	22	19	17	17	13	14	22	21	23	20	21	19	16	23	25	38	36	29	24	38	35	40	50	50	50	45	32	32	42	41	43	38	26	22	36	36	42	43	43	38	42	1														
▌Cornell	3	6	10	21	23	19	18	16	15	19	16	15	12	8	8	9	10	11	8	5	3	3	1	2	2	1		1	1	2	3	3	2	6	5	6	8	8	6	5	3	8	5		1													
▌Rogers	5	8	15	14	14	14	13	13	15	15	14	18	16	14	12	21	18	1						1							1	1	4	4	1		3	3	4	5	5	6	6															
▌Crowley		5	3	2	2	3	2		1	1												1	3							1	2	1		2	3	4	6	6	6	4	4	3	2															
▌Folger	2	2	2	1	1	1	1	1	1	1	2	2	2	1	2	2	2	3	3	1	1	2	2	1	1	1	1	1			1	1	1	1			1	1	1			1	1															
▌Pomeroy	2	1	3	1																																																						
▌Tremain		2	3	3	2			1	4	2	3	4	4	4	4	3	3	3	3	1																																						
▌Evarts		2	2																																											1			1	1	1	1						
▌Alvord		2	2																																																							
▌Wadsworth		2	1																																																							
▌White		2	1																																																							
▌Fenton		1	3	2	4	2																																																				
▌Edick		1	1	1	2																																																					
▌Bradley	1		1	1	1	1	1	1	1	1	1	1	1		1	1	1	1	1		1	1	1	1	3																																	
▌Fish		1	1	1	1																																								1	1	1											
▌Chapman		1	1	1																														1	1																							
▌Dutcher		1		1		1				1	1																																															
▌Ward		1																																																								
▌Miller		1																																																								
▌Beecher						1																																																				
▌Woodin						1																																																				
▌Harris										1	1	1	1																																													
▌Marvin																2																																										
▌Crowley																1	2	4	1	2	1																																					
▌Peckham																									4																																	
▌Hewitt																									3																																	
▌Kelly																									3																																	
▌Seymour																									3																																	
▌Parker																									2																																	
▌Bliss																									2																																	
▌Cox																									2																																	
▌Corning																									2																																	
▌Daniels																									1																																	
▌Tilden																									1																																	
▌Hoffman																									1																																	
▌Slocum																									1																																	
▌Grace																									1																																	
▌Westbrook																									1																																	
▌Scoville																									1																																	
▌Beach																									1																																	
▌Thompson																									1																																	
▌Kingsley																									1																																	
▌Babcock																									1																																	
▌Hoskins																										1	2	2		2		1	1			1																						
▌Roach																												1	1	1	1																											
▌Stoughton																																			1																							
▌Woodford																																														1	1	1	1				1	1	1	1	1	

== Aftermath ==
Lapham and Miller took their seats on October 11, 1881, and served single terms. Lapham remained in office until March 3, 1885; Miller until March 3, 1887.

Conkling's political career effectively ended after this episode, the longest deadlock in New York State legislative history until 1911.

Platt returned to the U.S. Senate in 1897, and served two terms until 1909.

== Sources ==
- "Members of the 47th United States Congress" (PDF). Archived from the original (PDF) on May 9, 2009 – via U.S. Government Printing Office.
- "SENSATION IN POLITICS; SENATORS CONKLING AND PLATT RESIGN" (PDF). The New York Times. May 17, 1881.
- "CONKLING'S CAUSE LOST; ONLY THIRTY-FIVE MEN INDUCED TO ATTEND A CAUCUS" (PDF). The New York Times. May 31, 1881.
- "THE DEMOCRATS IN CAUCUS.; THE EMPTY COMPLIMENT OF NOMINATION GIVEN TO JOHN C. JACOBS AND FRANCIS KERNAN" (PDF). The New York Times. May 31, 1881.
- "NAMING THE CANDIDATES" (PDF). The New York Times. June 1, 1881.
- "CONKLING'S FEW FRIENDS.; FIRMNESS OF BOTH SIDES IN THE SENATORIAL FIGHT" (PDF). The New York Times. June 2, 1881.
- "CONKLING LOSING GROUND; HIS VOTE DECREASED, HIS OPPONENTS CONCENTRATING" (PDF). The New York Times. June 3, 1881.
- "MR. CONKLING'S CONTEST; THE RESULT OF THE BALLOT TAKEN YESTERDAY" (PDF). The New York Times. June 4, 1881.
- "VOTING TO NO PURPOSE" (PDF). The New York Times. June 5, 1881.
- "THE DEAD-LOCK AT ALBANY; NO APPEARANCE OF A CONCENTRATION AGAINST CONKLING" (PDF). The New York Times. June 7, 1881.
- "THE SEVENTH BALLOT.;...MR. DEPEW'S GREAT GAINS" (PDF). The New York Times. June 8, 1881.
- "FEATURES OF THE BALLOT.; ..DEPEW'S VOTE INCREASED TO 51" (PDF). The New York Times. June 9, 1881.
- "THE NINTH BALLOT.; MR. DEPEW'S VOTE INCREASED" (PDF). The New York Times. June 10, 1881.
- "DEPEW'S STRENGTH INCREASED.; RESULT OF TWO MORE BALLOTS" (PDF). The New York Times. June 11, 1881.
- "THE TWELFTH JOINT BALLOT" (PDF). The New York Times. June 12, 1881.
- "THE THIRTEENTH BALLOT" (PDF). The New York Times. June 14, 1881.
- "THE FOURTEENTH BALLOT" (PDF). The New York Times. June 15, 1881.
- "CONKLING'S SELFISHNESS; THE EX-SENATOR DETERMINED ON THE RULE OR RUIN POLICY" (PDF). The New York Times. June 16, 1881.
- "THE SIXTEENTH BALLOT.; MR. WHEELER AHEAD OF CONKLING" (PDF). The New York Times. June 17, 1881.
- "THE SEVENTEENTH BALLOT" (PDF). The New York Times. June 18, 1881.
- "THE EIGHTEENTH BALLOT.; DEPEW WANTING NINE VOTES OF ELECTION" (PDF). The New York Times. June 19, 1881.
- "THE NINETEENTH BALLOT" (PDF). The New York Times. June 21, 1881.
- "TWO MORE BALLOTS TAKEN" (PDF). The New York Times. June 22, 1881.
- "SURPRISES IN THE VOTING.; RUNNING UP THE WHEELER VOTE.; THE DEMOCRATS SCARED AND JACOBS WITHDRAWN" (PDF). The New York Times. June 23, 1881.
- "THE DEMOCRATS' NEW CANDIDATE" (PDF). The New York Times. June 23, 1881.
- "TWO MORE BALLOTS" (PDF). The New York Times. June 24, 1881.
- "THE TWENTY-SIXTH BALLOT" (PDF). The New York Times. June 25, 1881.
- "THE TWENTY-SEVENTH BALLOT" (PDF). The New York Times. June 26, 1881.
- "ANOTHER LIGHT BALLOT" (PDF). The New York Times. June 28, 1881.
- "THE JOINT ASSEMBLY'S WORK" (PDF). The New York Times. June 29, 1881.
- "THE THIRTIETH BALLOT" (PDF). The New York Times. June 30, 1881.
- "THE THIRTY-FIRST BALLOT" (PDF). The New York Times. July 1, 1881.
- "A SURPRISE AT ALBANY; SUDDEN WITHDRAWAL OF PLATT FROM THE CONTEST" (PDF). The New York Times. July 2, 1882.
- "STILL VOTING FOR SENATORS.; A FALLING OFF IN THE THIRTY-THIRD BALLOT" (PDF). The New York Times. July 3, 1881.
- "NO CHOICE YET OF SENATORS" (PDF). The New York Times. July 5, 1881.
- "TWO MORE BALLOTS.; THE VOTING IN EACH PRECISELY ALIKE" (PDF). The New York Times. July 6, 1881., [giving wrong numbers of ballots "36th" and "37th" in the summary, correct was 35th and 36th]
- "THE THIRTY-SEVENTH BALLOT" (PDF). The New York Times. July 7, 1881.
- "NO AGREEMENT REACHED" (PDF). The New York Times. July 7, 1881.
- "TWO BALLOTS ADDED TO THE LIST" (PDF). The New York Times. July 8, 1881.
- "A CAUCUS AGREED UPON; SIXTY-TWO REPUBLICANS SIGN THE CALL" (PDF). The New York Times. July 8, 1881.
- "THE BALLOTING YESTERDAY" (PDF). The New York Times. July 9, 1881.
- "THE CHOICE OF A CAUCUS; WARNER MILLER AND E.G. LAPHAM NOMINATED" (PDF). The New York Times. July 9, 1881.
- "REPUDIATING THE CAUCUS; THE LAME EXCUSES OF CONKLING'S FOLLOWERS" (PDF). The New York Times. July 10, 1881.
- "THE FORTY-THIRD BALLOT" (PDF). The New York Times. July 12, 1881.
- "REQUESTING A NEW CAUCUS; THE STALWARTS FEARING A BREAK IN THEIR RANKS" (PDF). The New York Times. July 12, 1881.
- "ANOTHER FRUITLESS BALLOT" (PDF). The New York Times. July 13, 1881.
- "FEW CHANGES IN THE BALLOTING" (PDF). The New York Times. July 14, 1881.
- "THE FORTY-SIXTH BALLOT" (PDF). The New York Times. July 15, 1881.
- "ANOTHER BALLOT AND NO CHOICE" (PDF). The New York Times. July 16, 1881.
- "CONKLING'S RANKS BROKEN; ELECTION OF WARNER MILLER TO SUCCEED PLATT" (PDF). The New York Times. July 17, 1881.
- "TWO FRUITLESS BALLOTS.; LAPHAM WITHIN FIVE VOTES OF AN ELECTION" (PDF). The New York Times. July 19, 1881.
- "STILL STICKING TO CONKLING" (PDF). The New York Times. July 20, 1881.
- "THE UNBROKEN DEAD-LOCK" (PDF). The New York Times. July 21, 1881.
- "THE FIFTY-FOURTH BALLOT" (PDF). The New York Times. July 22, 1881.
- "ROSCOE CONKLING BEATEN; ELDRIDGE G. LAPHAM ELECTED HIS SUCCESSOR" (PDF). The New York Times. July 23, 1881.
