= Smith Mead Weed =

American politician (1833–1920)

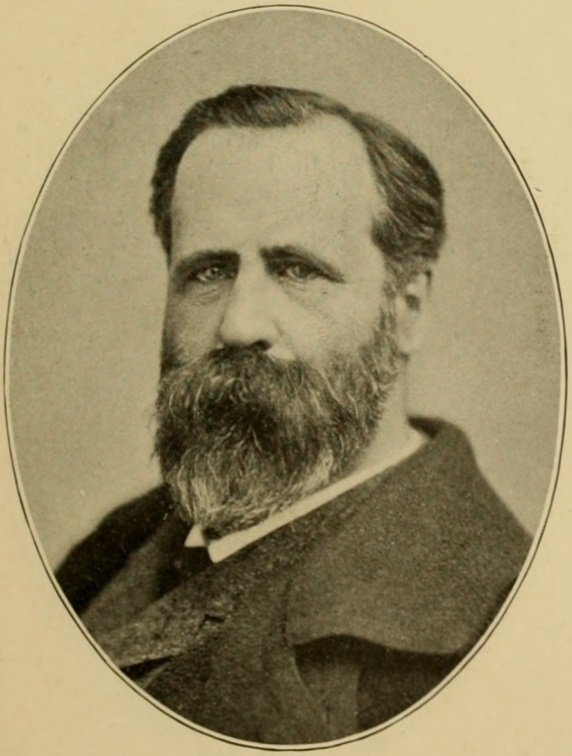
- Weed in 1899's Notable New Yorkers of 1896-1899

Member of the New York State Assembly from Clinton County
- In office January 1, 1873 – December 31, 1874
- Preceded by: Edmund Kingsland 2nd
- Succeeded by: Shepard P. Bowen
- In office January 1, 1871 – December 31, 1871
- Preceded by: Daniel G. Dodge
- Succeeded by: Edmund Kingsland 2nd
- In office January 1, 1865 – December 31, 1867
- Preceded by: George Hallock
- Succeeded by: William F. Cook

Personal details
- Born: July 26, 1833 Bellmont, New York, U.S.
- Died: June 7, 1920 (aged 86) Valcour Island, Plattsburgh, New York, U.S.
- Resting place: Riverside Cemetery, Plattsburgh, New York, U.S.
- Party: Democratic
- Spouse: Catherine L. Standish (m. 1859-1885, her death)
- Children: 5
- Education: Harvard Law School
- Occupation: Attorney

Smith Mead Weed (July 26, 1833 – June 7, 1920) was a Democratic lawyer and businessman from Plattsburgh, New York, who served as a member of the New York State Assembly from 1865 to 1867, in 1871, and again in 1873 and 1874.

A native of Bellmont, New York, Weed was an 1857 graduate of Harvard Law School. After attaining admission to the bar, he settled in the village of Plattsburgh, where he practiced law and became involved in businesses including lumber, mines, and railroads. He served in the New York State Assembly in 1865, 1866, 1867, 1871, 1873 and 1874. In 1871, Weed's opposition to the Tammany Hall Democratic organization caused a pro-Tammany Assembly member to assault him; the member resigned rather than face expulsion.

Weed attended several Democratic National Conventions as a delegate and was a supporter of Samuel J. Tilden for president in 1876 and 1880. During the controversy that followed the disputed 1876 election, Weed was accused of attempting to bribe election officials in contested states in order to procure their support for Tilden.

Weed was a candidate for U.S. Senate three times; when Republicans held state legislative majorities in 1887 and 1905, Weed was nominated by Democrats as an honor, and lost to the Republican nominees. When Democrats held a legislative majority in 1891, Weed expected to be the nominee and win election to the Senate, but deferred to incumbent Governor David B. Hill, who went on to win the seat.

Weed died on Valcour Island on June 7, 1920, and was buried at Riverside Cemetery in Plattsburgh.

== Early life ==
Smith M. Weed was born in Bellmont, New York, on July 26, 1833, the son of Roswell Alcott Weed and Sarah A. Mead. He was educated in Franklin County, New York, studied law with Judge George Mather Beckwith, and attended Harvard Law School, from which he graduated in 1857. He was admitted to the bar and practiced in the village of Plattsburgh. In addition, he became active in local politics and government, including several terms as village president. Weed was also active in numerous business ventures, including lumber, mining, and railroads.

== Political career ==
Weed was a member of the New York State Assembly from Clinton County in 1865, 1866, 1867, 1871, 1873 and 1874 (the 88th, 89th, and 90th legislatures, and 94th, 96th and 97th legislatures). In 1867, he was a delegate to the state constitutional convention. In 1871, Weed's opposition to the Tammany Hall Democratic organization led to an assault on Weed by James Irving, a pro-Tammany member of the Assembly; Irving chose to resign in order to prevent being expelled.

A supporter of Samuel J. Tilden, Weed was a delegate to the 1876 Democratic National Convention. In the dispute that followed the 1876 election, Weed was accused of attempting to bribe election officials in the disputed states to award their electoral votes to Tilden. Weed was also a delegate to the 1880 convention and the one in 1884.

He was the Democratic nominee for U.S. Senate in the January 1887 election. Republicans controlled the state legislature, and he lost to Republican Frank Hiscock. In 1890, Weed was a prominent organizer and financial supporter of his party's effort to take control of the state legislature. With a narrow minority in the State Senate but a small majority in the Assembly, the Democrats were positioned to elect on a joint ballot one of their own to the US Senate in 1891 as the successor to William M. Evarts. Weed expected to be his party's candidate, but agreed to withdraw if Governor David B. Hill desired the nomination. Hill decided to run; Weed withdrew as a candidate, and Hill won the Senate seat. Weed was the Democratic US Senate nominee again in 1905; Republicans controlled the legislature, and reelected Chauncey Depew.

== Death and burial ==
He died on Valcour Island on June 7, 1920 and was buried at Riverside Cemetery in Plattsburgh.

== Family ==
In 1859, Weed married Catherine L. Standish (1836-1885), a descendant of Myles Standish. They were the parents of five children - Roswell Alcott, George Standish, Margaret Celeste, Caroline, Katherine Miller, and Standish Kellogg.

== Legacy ==
Plattsburgh's Smith Weed Bridge is named for Weed, as are the city's Weed Street and Weed Street Extension. Weed's former home at the corner of Sailly Avenue and City Hall Place still stands. It is privately owned, and is the location of a local law firm's offices.

== See also ==
- 1887 United States Senate election in New York
- 1891 United States Senate election in New York
- 1905 United States Senate election in New York

New York State Assembly
Preceded by George Hallock	New York State Assembly; Clinton County; 1865–1867	Succeeded by William F. Cook
Preceded by Daniel G. Dodge	New York State Assembly; Clinton County; 1871	Succeeded by Edmund Kingsland 2nd
Preceded by Edmund Kingsland 2nd	New York State Assembly; Clinton County; 1873–1874	Succeeded by Shepard P. Bowen

== Sources ==
=== Books ===
- McElroy, William H.; McBride, Alex. (1873). Life Sketches of Executive Officers and Members of the Legislature of the State of New York. Albany, NY: Weed, Parsons and Company. p. 322.
- Schiller, Wendy J.; Stewart, Charles III (2015). Electing the Senate: Indirect Democracy before the Seventeenth Amendment. Princeton, NJ: Princeton University Press. ISBN 978-0-691-16317-8.
- Standish, Myles, M.D. (1895). The Standishes of America. Boston, MA: Samuel Usher.

=== Newspapers ===
- "The St. Louis Convention: The First Day". Burlington Weekly Free Press. Burlington, VT. July 14, 1876 – via Newspapers.com.
- "Political Notes: Smith M. Weed". Burlington Weekly Free Press. Burlington, VT. November 15, 1876 – via Newspapers.com.
- "The Bourbons Begin Work". The New York Times. New York, NY. June 23, 1880 – via Newspapers.com.
- "The Unit Rule". Chicago Tribune. Chicago, IL. July 8, 1884 – via Newspapers.com.
- "Hill and Weed and the United States Senatorship". New York Herald. New York, NY. January 10, 1891 – via Library of Congress.
- "Smith M. Weed Tricked: How He Was Swindled Out of the Senatorship; The Story of Gov. Hill's Sly Game". The New York Times. New York, NY. April 9, 1891.
- "Smith M. Weed Dies in Plattsburg". The New York Times. June 8, 1920.
- Ovalle, Nathan (December 14, 2014). "Lost in History: Smith Weed's legacy fading with time". Press-Republican. Plattsburgh, NY.

=== Internet ===
- "Riverside Cemetery, Plattsburgh, Clinton County, New York". Northern New York Tombstone Project. Joyce M. Ranieri. 2005. Archived from the original on March 28, 2019.
