= Frank Hiscock =

American politician (1834–1914)

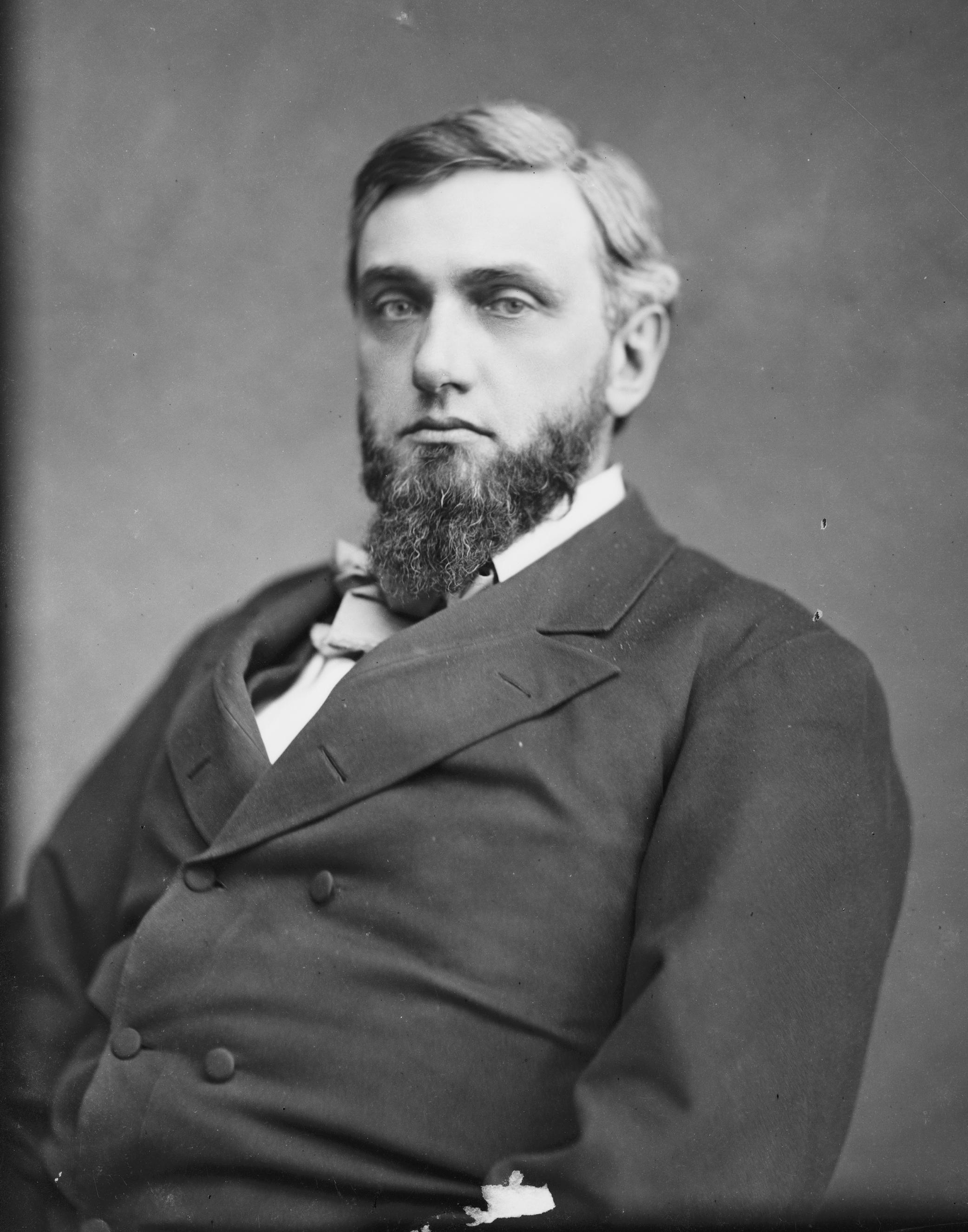
- Hiscock, 1865–1880

United States Senator from New York
- In office March 4, 1887 – March 3, 1893
- Preceded by: Warner Miller
- Succeeded by: Edward Murphy Jr.

Member of the U.S. House of Representatives from New York's 25th district
- In office March 4, 1877 – March 3, 1887
- Preceded by: Elias W. Leavenworth
- Succeeded by: James J. Belden

Personal details
- Born: September 6, 1834 Pompey, New York
- Died: June 18, 1914 (aged 79) Syracuse, New York
- Resting place: Oakwood Cemetery, Syracuse, New York
- Party: Republican
- Spouse: Cornelia King (m. 1859; died 1908)
- Relations: L. Harris Hiscock (brother); Frank H. Hiscock, nephew
- Children: 2
- Profession: Politician, lawyer

Frank Hiscock (September 6, 1834 – June 18, 1914) was an American lawyer and politician who served as both a U.S. Representative and a U.S. Senator from New York. In total, he served New York in the United States Congress from 1877 to 1893.

== Early life ==
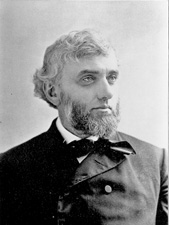
Frank Hiscock

Hiscock was born in Pompey, Onondaga County, New York, September 6, 1834. He graduated from Pompey Academy and studied law with his brother L. Harris Hiscock. He was admitted to the bar in 1855 and commenced practice in Tully, Onondaga County, New York. L. Harris Hiscock and Frank Hiscock were founders of the Syracuse firm currently known as Hiscock & Barclay.

== Political career ==
In addition to practicing law, Hiscock became involved in politics, initially as an anti-slavery Democrat, and then as a member of the Free Soil Party. Hiscock became a Republican when the party was founded in the 1850s, and served as district attorney of Onondaga County from 1860 to 1863. He was a member of the State constitutional convention in 1867, elected to fill the vacancy caused by the death of his brother. In 1872 Hiscock supported Liberal Republican nominee Horace Greeley for President, and in 1876 he was a delegate to the Republican National Convention.

=== U.S. House of Representatives ===
He was elected as a representative to the Forty-fifth and to the four succeeding Congresses and served from March 4, 1877, to March 3, 1887. He was chairman of the House Committee on Appropriations in the (Forty-seventh Congress). He was reelected in 1886 for the term starting March 4, 1887, but resigned in order to accept the U.S. Senate seat to which he had been elected in January, 1887.

=== U.S. Senate ===
Hiscock was elected to the United States Senate by the New York State Legislature, defeating incumbent Warner Miller and Levi P. Morton in the Republican caucus and Democrat Smith M. Weed in the vote of the full legislature. Hiscock served from March 4, 1887, to March 3, 1893, and was chairman of the Committee on Organization, Conduct, and Expenditures of Executive Departments (Fifty-first and Fifty-second Congresses).

Hiscock was an unsuccessful candidate for reelection. After leaving the Senate, he resumed the practice of law in Syracuse.

== Death and burial ==
He died in Syracuse on June 18, 1914, of apoplexy. He was interred in Oakwood Cemetery.

== Family ==
On November 23, 1859, Hiscock married Cornelia King (1837-1908), and their children included sons Albert King Hiscock (1861-1908) and Fidelio King Hiscock (1869-1917). Frank Hiscock and his wife also raised their nephew Frank H. Hiscock following the death of his father L. Harris Hiscock.

U.S. House of Representatives
Preceded by Elias W. Leavenworth	Member of the U.S. House of Representatives from New York's 25th congressional district March 4, 1877 – March 3, 1887	Succeeded by James J. Belden
U.S. Senate
Preceded by Warner Miller	U.S. senator (Class 1) from New York; March 4, 1887 – March 4, 1893; Served alongside: William M. Evarts, David B. Hill	Succeeded by Edward Murphy Jr.
