= Charles Daniels (New York politician) =

American judge

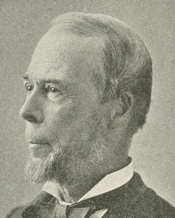

Chairman of the Committee on Elections No. 1
- In office 1895–1897

Member of the U.S. House of Representatives from New York's 33rd district
- In office March 4, 1893 – March 3, 1897
- Preceded by: Thomas L. Bunting
- Succeeded by: De Alva S. Alexander

Justice of the New York Supreme Court
- In office 1863–1891

Personal details
- Born: March 24, 1825 New York City, New York, US
- Died: December 20, 1897 (aged 72) Buffalo, New York, US
- Party: Republican

Charles Daniels (March 24, 1825 – December 20, 1897) was an American lawyer and politician.

== Life ==
Charles Daniels was born in New York City on March 24, 1825. (Note: At least one source gives his birthplce as Buffalo, New York.) He was taken to Toledo, Ohio at an early age, and learned his father's trade of shoemaker. In 1842, he moved to Buffalo, New York, where he studied law. In 1847, he was admitted to the bar and commenced practice in Buffalo.

In 1863, he was appointed by Governor Horatio Seymour a justice of the New York Supreme Court, to fill the vacancy caused by the death of James J. Hoyt. Later that year, he was elected to the remainder of Hoyt's term, then re-elected to an eight-year term in 1869, and re-elected to a fourteen-year term in 1877, remaining on the bench until the end of 1891, when his term expired. In 1869, he was ex officio a judge of the New York Court of Appeals.

In June 1878, he married Mrs. Mary E. Enos.

In the New York state elections of 1886, he ran for the New York Court of Appeals, but was defeated by Democrat Rufus W. Peckham Jr.

He was elected as a Republican to the 53rd and 54th United States Congresses, and served from March 4, 1893, to March 3, 1897. He was Chairman of the Committee on Elections No. 1 (Fifty-fourth Congress).

He died at his office in Buffalo on December 20, 1897, and was buried at Forest Lawn Cemetery.

== Sources ==
- United States Congress. "Charles Daniels (id: D000040)". Biographical Directory of the United States Congress.
- This article incorporates public domain material from Biographical Directory of the United States Congress. Federal government of the United States.

U.S. House of Representatives
Preceded by Thomas L. Bunting	Member of the U.S. House of Representatives from New York's 33rd congressional district 1893–1897	Succeeded by De Alva S. Alexander
