= 1887 United States Senate election in Massachusetts =

- January 18 and 19, 1887

280 members of the Massachusetts General Court Majority of votes needed to win
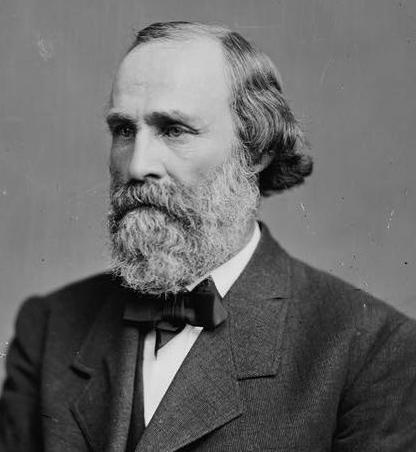

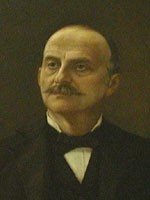

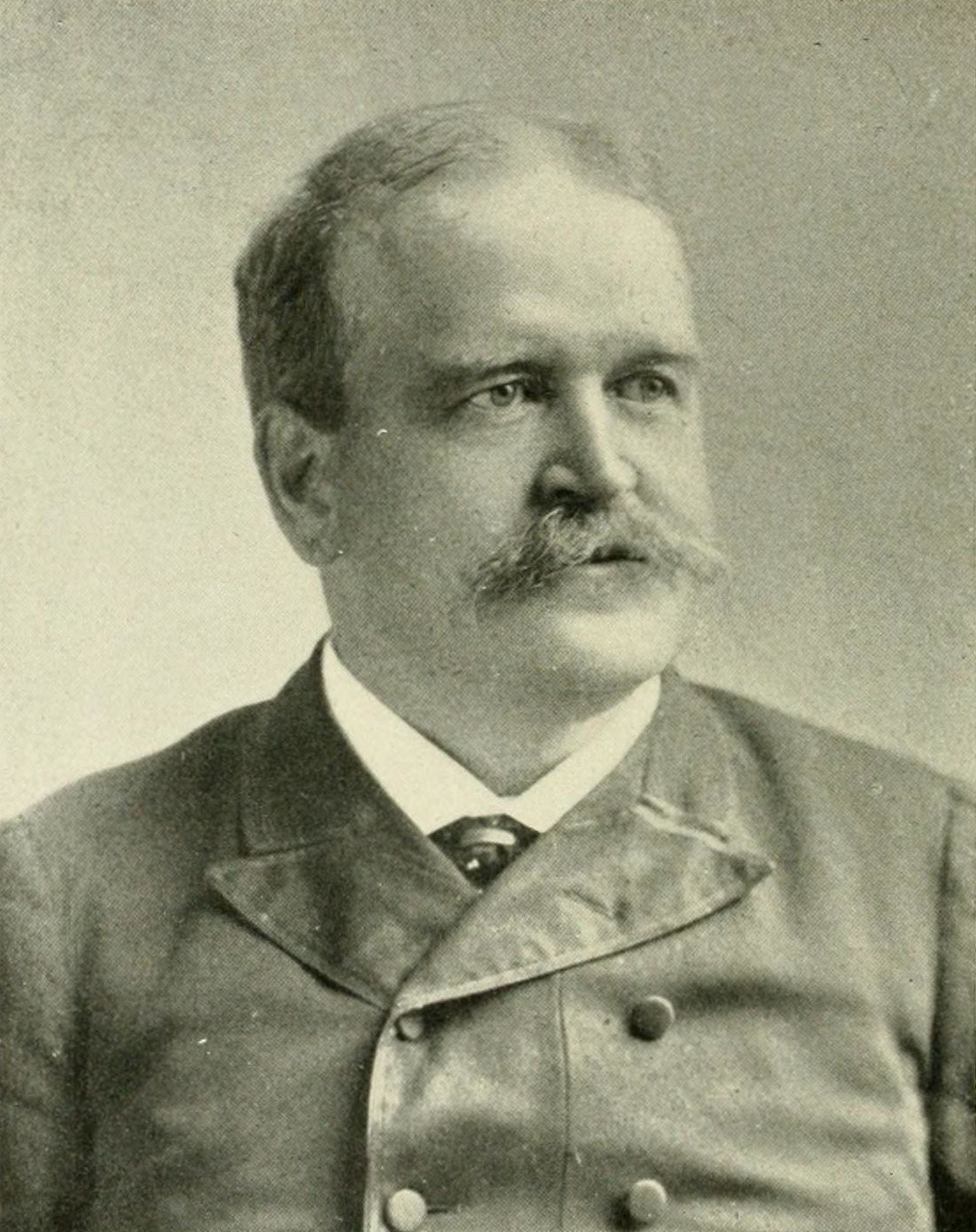
| Nominee | Henry L. Dawes | George D. Robinson | John D. Long |
| Party | Republican | Republican | Republican |
| Electoral vote | 181 | 57 | 26 |
| Percentage | 65.58% | 20.65% | 9.42% |
Senator before election
Henry L. Dawes
Republican
Elected Senator
Henry L. Dawes
Republican

The 1887 United States Senate election in Massachusetts was held during January 1887. Republican incumbent Henry L. Dawes was re-elected to a third term over opposition from within his own party, led by former Governor John Davis Long.

At the time, Massachusetts elected United States senators by a majority vote of the combined houses of the Massachusetts General Court.

== Background ==
Massachusetts had been a solidly Republican state since the start of the American Civil War. The Senate consisted of 25 Republicans and 14 Democrats, and the House consisted of 158 Republicans, 78 Democrats, and 5 independents.

== Candidates ==
=== Declared ===
- Henry L. Dawes, incumbent Senator since 1874
- John Davis Long, U.S. Representative from Hingham and former Governor of Massachusetts

=== Declined ===
- George D. Robinson, Governor of Massachusetts since 1884 (Note: Robinson declared on January 1 that he was not a candidate for Senate, but his denial was not so emphatic that supporters abandoned hope.)

== Campaign ==
On January 10, Long supporters in the legislature moved for a binding Republican caucus to nominate a single candidate and coalesce the Republican vote. Dawes supporters killed the motion and instead substituted one for a non-binding conference. Without a binding caucus, the candidates would be put to the whole of the legislature, where Dawes could rely on his support among Democrats and independents.

Some considered the matter to be a conclusive victory for Dawes. However, there was a chance that Long could pick up Democratic votes in the legislature, as he had in 1883.

On January 11, both candidates conducted separate canvasses of the legislature, and each found that they would win by around 75 votes.

On January 17, Democrats caucused and determined to cast their first ballot for Patrick A. Collins, and then to divide between Dawes and Long on subsequent ballots. Supporters of Governor George Robinson also determined to cast their ballots for Dawes after voting for Robinson in early balloting, a major blow to Long.

== Balloting ==
=== First ballot ===
On the first ballots, Long was well behind Dawes. However, some of his supporters intentionally cast ballots for George Robinson. No candidate was close to the required majority in either house. It was generally conceded by all but the Long faction that Dawes would be re-elected given his unexpected lead in the House and rumors that Democrats would cast their votes for him tomorrow.

First ballot, Senate
| Party | Candidate | Votes | % |
|---|---|---|---|
| Democratic | Patrick A. Collins | 14 | 35.00% |
| Republican | John Davis Long | 12 | 30.00% |
| Republican | Henry L. Dawes | 11 | 27.50% |
| Republican | George D. Robinson | 2 | 5.00% |
| Total votes | | 40 | 100.00% |

First ballot, House
| Party | Candidate | Votes | % |
|---|---|---|---|
| Democratic | Patrick A. Collins | 81 | 34.62% |
| Republican | Henry L. Dawes | 65 | 27.78% |
| Republican | John Davis Long | 44 | 18.80% |
| Republican | George D. Robinson | 44 | 18.80% |
| Total votes | | 234 | 100.00% |

=== Second ballot ===
On January 19, Democrats held a legislative conference to determine their action on the second ballot. The legislature met in joint convention to decide the election, rather than meeting as separate houses.

Second ballot
| Party | Candidate | Votes | % |
|---|---|---|---|
| Democratic | Patrick A. Collins | 92 | 33.33% |
| Republican | Henry L. Dawes | 76 | 27.54% |
| Republican | John Davis Long | 53 | 19.20% |
| Republican | George D. Robinson | 53 | 19.20% |
| Democratic | John E. Russell | 1 | 0.36% |
| Total votes | | 276 | 100.00% |

Second ballot, after changes
| Party | Candidate | Votes | % |
|---|---|---|---|
| Republican | Henry L. Dawes | 181 | 65.58% |
| Republican | George D. Robinson | 57 | 20.65% |
| Republican | John Davis Long | 26 | 9.42% |
| Democratic | Patrick A. Collins | 11 | 3.99% |
| Democratic | John E. Russell | 1 | 0.36% |
| Total votes | | 276 | 100.00% |
