= Warner Miller =

American businessman and politician (1838–1918)

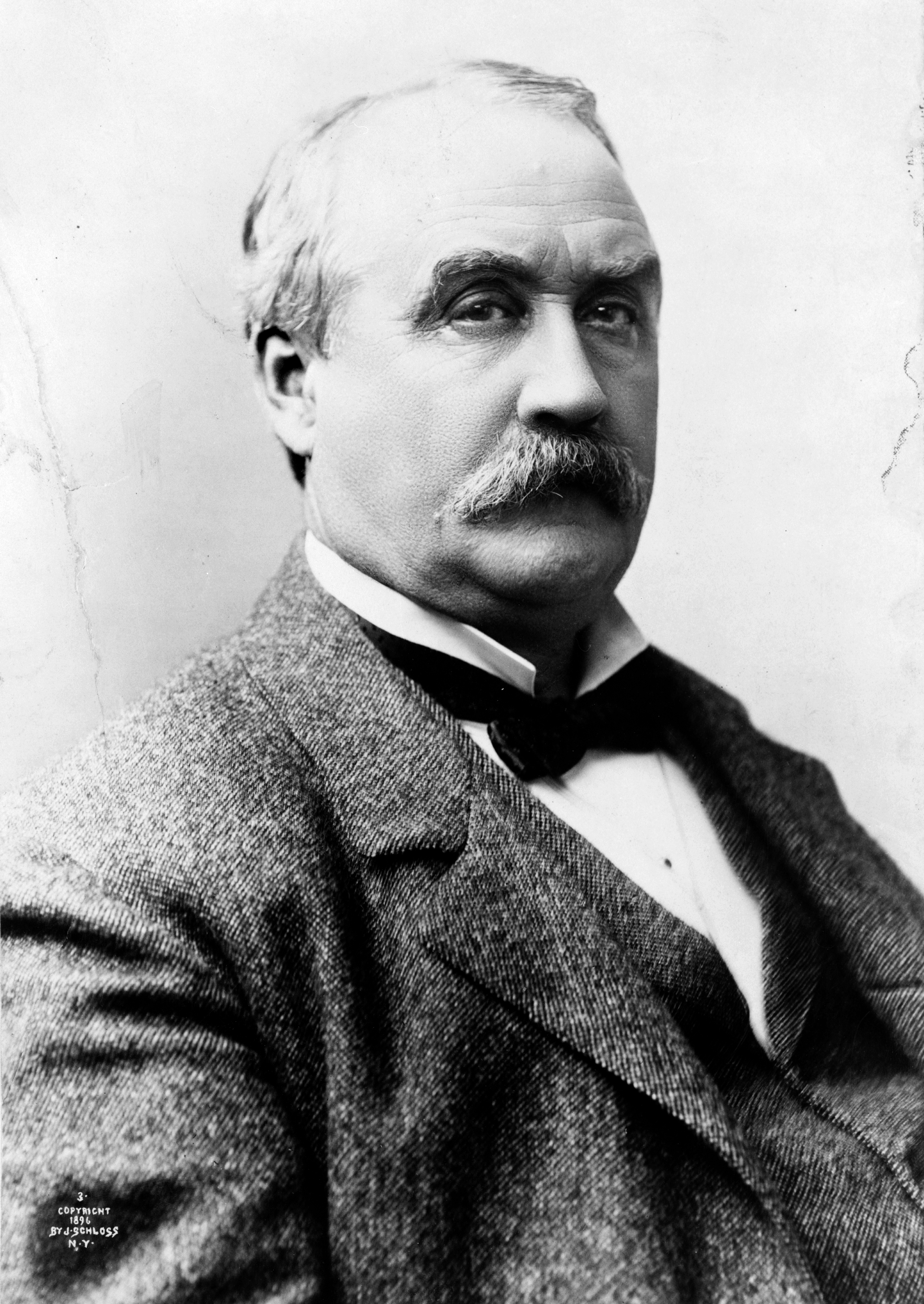
- Miller in 1896

United States Senator from New York
- In office July 27, 1881 – March 3, 1887
- Preceded by: Thomas C. Platt
- Succeeded by: Frank Hiscock

Member of the U.S. House of Representatives from New York's 22nd district
- In office March 4, 1879 – July 26, 1881
- Preceded by: George A. Bagley
- Succeeded by: Charles R. Skinner

Member of the New York State Assembly from the Herkimer County district
- In office January 1, 1874 – December 31, 1875
- Preceded by: Eleazer C. Rice
- Succeeded by: Myron A. McKee

Personal details
- Born: August 12, 1838 Hannibal, New York, US
- Died: March 21, 1918 (aged 79) New York City, New York, US
- Resting place: Oak Hill Cemetery, Herkimer, New York, US
- Party: Republican
- Spouse: Caroline Churchill Miller (m. 1864-1903, her death)
- Children: 5
- Education: Union College
- Profession: Paper company executive

Military service
- Allegiance: United States of America; Union
- Branch/service: Union Army
- Years of service: 1861–1862
- Rank: First Lieutenant
- Unit: 5th New York Cavalry Regiment
- Battles/wars: American Civil War: First Battle of Winchester

Warner Miller (August 12, 1838 – March 21, 1918) was an American businessman and politician from Herkimer, New York. A Republican, he was most notable for his service as a U.S. representative (1879-1881) and United States Senator (1881-1887).

A native of Hannibal, New York, Miller graduated from Union College in 1860. He enlisted for the American Civil War as a private in the Union Army's 5th New York Cavalry Regiment. Later commissioned as a first lieutenant, Miller was taken prisoner in 1862 and paroled, after which he received an honorable discharge.

Following his military service, Miller became active in the papermaking business in Herkimer, New York. His invention of machines for inexpensively making paper from wood pulp made him wealthy, and he later became active in other businesses, including railroads, insurance, and mining.

Miller served in the New York State Assembly in 1874 and 1875. In 1878 he was elected to the U.S. House, and he was reelected in 1880. After serving one full term and one partial, he resigned from the U.S. House in order to accept election to the U.S. Senate. Elected with Elbridge G. Lapham to replace Roscoe Conkling and Thomas C. Platt after Conkling and Platt resigned over a dispute with President James A. Garfield, Miller served one partial term, July 1881 to March 1887. During his Senate service, Miller was chairman of the Senate Committee on Agriculture and Forestry.

After leaving the Senate, Miller twice ran for governor of New York. He won the Republican nomination in 1888, but lost the general election to incumbent David B. Hill. In 1894, Miller lost the Republican nomination to Levi P. Morton, who went on to win the general election. In retirement, Miller was a resident of Herkimer. He died in New York City on March 21, 1918, and was buried at Oak Hill Cemetery in Herkimer.

== Birth and early life ==
Warner Miller was born in Hannibal, New York, on August 12, 1838, a son of Hiram Miller and Mary Ann (Warner) Miller. He attended the common schools of Oswego County and Charlotteville Academy, then became a teacher of Latin and Greek at the Collegiate Institute of Fort Edward, New York. He then began attendance at Union College in Schenectady, New York. In 1860, he graduated with an AB degree. Miller maintained a lifelong association with Union College; in 1886, he received the honorary degree of LL.D. He also served on the board of trustees, and frequently spoke at the college's public occasions.

== Military service ==
In October 1861, Miller joined the military for the American Civil War, enlisting as a private in Company I, 5th New York Cavalry Regiment. He advanced to become the regimental sergeant major, then received his commission as a first lieutenant. On May 25, 1862, Miller was taken prisoner during the First Battle of Winchester. With The Union Army not taking part in prisoner exchanges, Miller was instead paroled by the Confederate States Army at the end of the month. His parole prevented him from returning to military service, so he was compelled to accept an honorable discharge and return to New York. After the war, Miller participated in veterans' activities and was a member of the Grand Army of the Republic.

== Business career ==
After his military service, Miller was employed at a paper mill in Fort Edward, of which he soon became superintendent. He engaged in a scientific study of papermaking, including a trip to Belgium to observe paper being made from straw. After returning to the United States, Miller organized a company to buy several paper mills in Herkimer, New York, where he began the manufacture of paper from wood pulp on an industrial scale.

Miller invented a machine for making wood pulp paper inexpensively. After initial difficulty marketing his machines, other papermakers began to recognize their value and began to purchase them. Miller became wealthy as his invention became the industry standard.

In addition to his papermaking business, Miller was involved in several other enterprises. These included serving as president of the Nicaragua Canal Construction Company, a venture to build a cross-isthmus canal in Central America prior to the Panama Canal. In addition, he served as a director of the Industrial and Mining Guaranty Company. After the Spanish–American War, Miller was an original incorporator of a venture in the Philippines, the Philippine Plantation Company. Miller's other ventures included serving on the board of directors of the Traders Fire Insurance Company and the St. Louis, Emporia and Denver Rail Road.

== Public service career ==
=== State Assembly ===
A Republican, Miller was a member of the New York State Assembly (Herkimer Co.) in 1874 and 1875. Miller was interested in public education, and introduced an unsuccessful bill that would have resolved an ongoing conflict between the state superintendent of public instruction and the state Board of Regents by eliminating the Regents. He also introduced a successful bill to require that drawing be taught in public schools.

=== U.S. House ===
In 1878, Miller was elected to the United States House of Representatives. He was reelected in 1880, and served in the 46th and 47th United States Congresses (March 4, 1879, to July 26, 1881). During his House service, Miller was a member of the committees on Engrossed Bills, Insurance, Railways and Canals, and Ways and Means. His peers ranked him as among the most effective members of the House.

=== U.S. Senate ===
In 1881, Republican U.S. Senators Roscoe Conkling and Thomas C. Platt, leaders of the Republican Stalwart faction, resigned their seats during a dispute with President James A. Garfield, who was supported by the Half-Breed faction, over patronage positions in New York. They assumed they would quickly be reelected by the New York State Legislature, which would strengthen their position with respect to the patronage dispute. Instead, the legislature chose two new senators, Stalwart Elbridge G. Lapham to replace Conkling, and Half-Breed Miller to replace Platt.

Miller served from July 27, 1881, to March 3, 1887 (the 47th, 48th, and 49th Congresses). His committee assignments included Agriculture, Commerce, and Education and Labor. He served as chairman of the Agriculture Committee in the 48th and 49th Congresses.

In 1887, Miller was a candidate for reelection. Republicans controlled the state legislature, ensuring that their nominee would win. Platt was determined to see Miller defeated, and supported Stalwart Levi P. Morton. A third candidate, Frank Hiscock, was not affiliated with either faction and had little initial support. After 17 ballots failed to produce a nominee, Morton asked his supporters to back Hiscock, thus ensuring that Miller would be defeated. Hiscock won the nomination and went on to win the seat in the vote by the full legislature.

== Later years ==
He ran for Governor of New York at the New York state election, 1888, but was defeated by the incumbent Democrat David B. Hill. In 1894, Miller was again a candidate for governor, but Platt succeeded in obtaining the Republican nomination for Levi P. Morton, who won the general election.

When International Paper was formed in 1898, Miller sold his paper mills to the new concern. In retirement, he was a resident of Herkimer. In 1906, Miller was appointed chairman of a state Special Tax Commission, a panel of legislators and citizens that reviewed New York's tax laws and recommended revisions to the state legislature. He died in New York City on March 21, 1918. Miller was interred at Oak Hill Cemetery in Herkimer.

== Family ==
In 1864, Miller married Caroline Churchill. They were the parents of four sons and a daughter: Ralph, Max, Burr, Guy, and Augusta. Burr Churchill Miller became a noted sculptor.

== See also ==
Party political offices
| Preceded by Ira Davenport | Republican nominee for Governor of New York; 1888 | Succeeded by Jacob Sloat Fassett |
New York State Assembly
| Preceded by Eleazer C. Rice | New York State Assembly; Herkimer County; 1874-1875 | Succeeded by Myron A. McKee |
U.S. House of Representatives
| Preceded by George A. Bagley | Member of the U.S. House of Representatives from New York's 22nd congressional district March 4, 1879 – July 26, 1881 | Succeeded by Charles R. Skinner |
U.S. Senate
| Preceded by Thomas C. Platt | U.S. senator (Class 1) from New York; July 27, 1881 – March 3, 1887; Served alongside: Elbridge G. Lapham, William M. Evarts | Succeeded by Frank Hiscock |
