= 1886 New York state election =

- November 2, 1886

The 1886 New York state election was held on November 2, 1886, to elect a judge of the New York Court of Appeals, as well as all members of the New York State Assembly.

== History ==
In 1880, there was only one state officer to be elected statewide: a judge of the Court of Appeals, to succeed Theodore Miller who had reached the constitutional age limit of 70 years.

The Republican State Committee met on September 29 at the Gilsey House in New York City. Charles Daniels was nominated for the Court of Appeals.

The Democratic State Committee met on September 29 at Hoffman House in New York City. Charles C. B. Walker was chairman. Rufus W. Peckham was nominated for the Court of Appeals by acclamation.

== Result ==
The Democratic judge was elected in a tight race, with a plurality of less than 8,000 votes. Only in New York City, Peckham had a majority of over 53,000 votes, thus swamping the solid Republican upstate majority.

1886 state election result
Office	Democratic ticket		Republican ticket		Prohibition ticket		Greenback ticket	
Judge of the Court of Appeals	Rufus W. Peckham Jr.	468,815	Charles Daniels	461,018	William J. Groo	36,437	Lawrence J. McParlin	2,281

== See also ==
- New York state elections
