= Thomas C. Platt =

American politician (1833–1910)

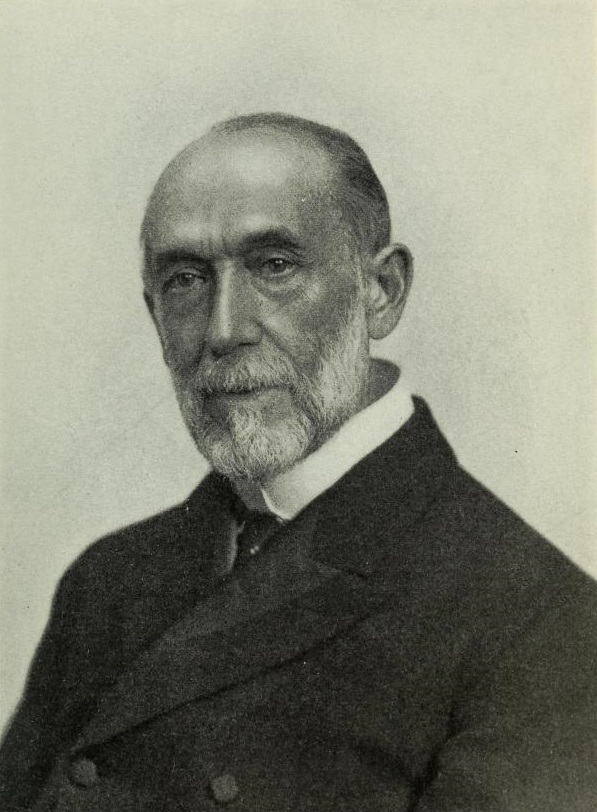
- Platt in 1903

United States Senator from New York
- In office March 4, 1897 – March 3, 1909
- Preceded by: David B. Hill
- Succeeded by: Elihu Root
- In office March 4, 1881 – May 16, 1881
- Preceded by: Francis Kernan
- Succeeded by: Warner Miller

Member of the U.S. House of Representatives from New York
- In office March 4, 1873 – March 3, 1877
- Preceded by: Horace B. Smith
- Succeeded by: Jeremiah W. Dwight
- Constituency: 27th district (1873–75); 28th district (1875–77)

Personal details
- Born: Thomas Collier Platt; July 15, 1833 Owego, New York
- Died: March 6, 1910 (aged 76) New York City, New York
- Party: Republican
- Relatives: Thomas Collier Platt Jr. (great-grandson)
- Education: Yale College (did not graduate)

Thomas Collier Platt (July 15, 1833 – March 6, 1910), also known as Tom Platt and Easy Boss, was an American politician who was a two-term member of the U.S. House of Representatives (1873–1877) and a three-term U.S. Senator from New York in 1881 and 1897 to 1909. He was the "political boss" of the Republican Party in New York State in the late 19th century and early 20th century. Upon his death, the New York Times stated that "no man ever exercised less influence in the Senate or the House of Representatives than he," but "no man ever exercised more power as a political leader." He considered himself the "political godfather" of many Republican governors of the state, including Theodore Roosevelt.

Platt played a key role in the creation of the City of Greater New York, which incorporated together the boroughs of New York (Manhattan), Kings (Brooklyn), Queens, Richmond (Staten Island) and Bronx counties.

== Early years ==
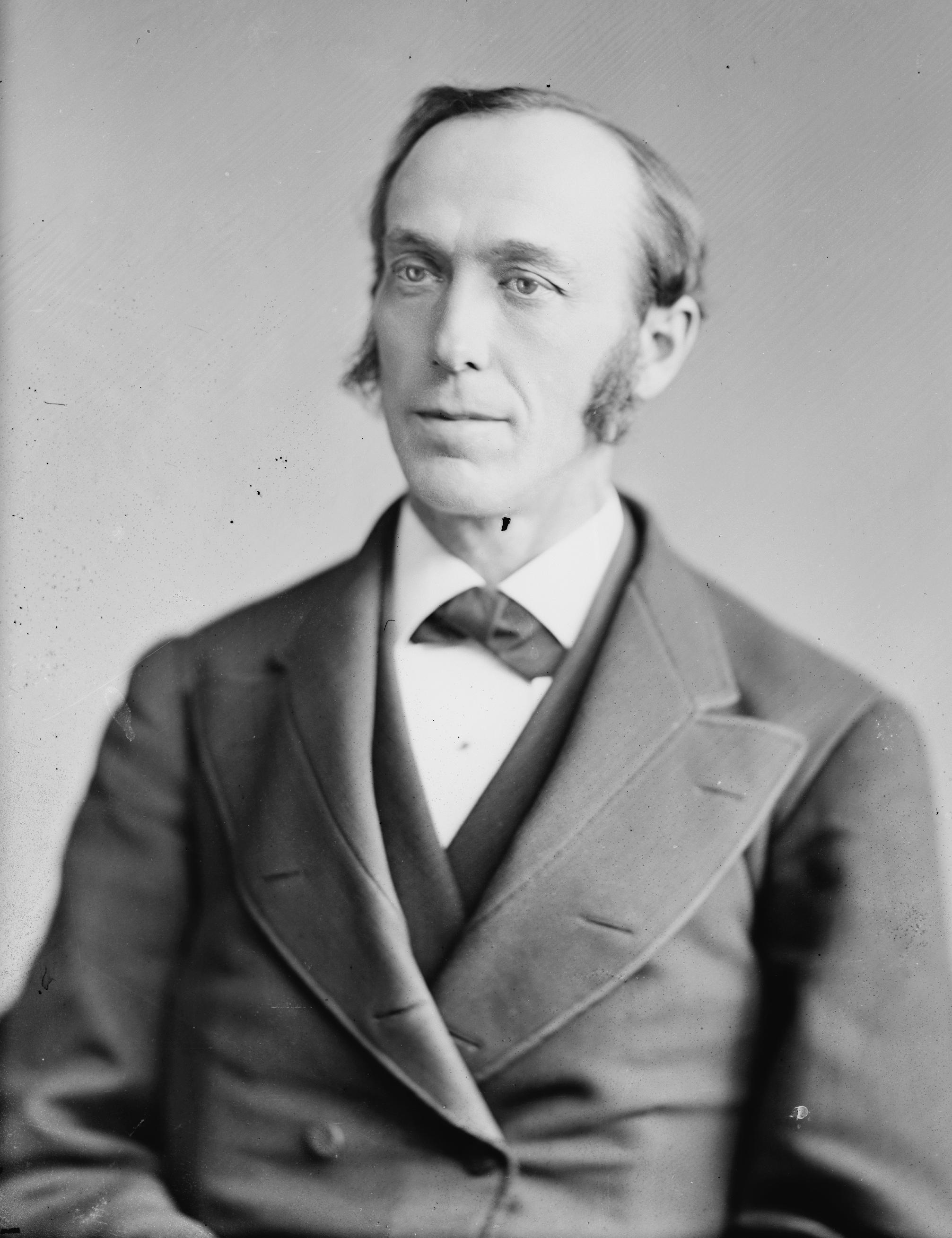
Thomas C. Platt

Platt was born to William Platt, a lawyer, and Lesbia Hinchman, in Owego, Tioga County, New York on July 15, 1833. State Senator Nehemiah Platt (1797–1851) was William Platt's brother.

William Platt, a successful attorney and strict Presbyterian, encouraged his son to enter the ministry. Accordingly, the young Platt was prepared for college at the Owego Academy and attended Yale College (1850–1852), where he studied theology but failed to earn a degree owing to ill health which forced his withdrawal.

After leaving Yale in 1852, he entered into a variety of employments. He started out as a druggist, a business in which he was engaged for two decades; was briefly an editor of a small newspaper; served as president of the Tioga National Bank; and was interested in the lumbering business in Michigan. He also acted as President of the Southern Central and other railways.

In 1852, he married his cousin Ellen Lucy Barstow with whom he had three sons: Edward T. Platt, Frank H. Platt, and Henry B. Platt. During the American Civil War, Platt's illness prevented him from serving in the Union military, but he raised money to support troops and actively urged support for the Lincoln Administration.

Platt became secretary and a director of the United States Express Co. in 1879 and was elected president of the company in 1880. He was president of the Board of Quarantine Commissioners of New York from 1880 to 1888 and was President of the Tennessee Coal & Iron Company for several years.

== Early political career ==
Platt's political involvement began at the Republican Party's inception; he made his first appearance in politics in 1856 in the campaign of the party's first presidential candidate, John C. Frémont. Running as a Republican, he was elected clerk of Tioga County, serving from 1859 to 1861. He was elected as a Republican to the 43rd United States Congress and the 44th United States Congress, serving from March 4, 1873, to March 3, 1877. His influence on statewide politics began on his return from Congress in 1877, when he aligned with the "Stalwart" faction led by U.S. senator Roscoe Conkling at the party's state convention, and against the "Half-Breed" faction loyal to President Rutherford B. Hayes.

In 1876, Platt declined to seek re-election to the House. During the same year in the 1876 United States presidential election, he joined the "Conkling for President" movement when he attended a Republican National Convention for the first time. A grateful and responsive Sen. Conkling in turn appointed Platt to become the GOP State Committee chairman.

=== Garfield nominates Robertson; Conkling and Platt resign ===
In January 1881 he was elected with the support of the Stalwart faction to represent New York in the United States Senate. His election was ensured due to an intraparty compromise with Republican Half-Breed candidate Chauncey M. Depew, who also sought the seat. Preceding the party nominations, Depew told Platt: "You can have my strength if as senator you will support [Garfield]." Platt agreed to the terms, purportedly having responded:

I have done my best to elect a Republican president and as senator I will support him.

— Platt, 1881

Responding to this, a supporter of Depew speculated if Platt would unwavering support Garfield such that the latter nominates W. H. Robertson to a lucrative post; Platt replied in the affirmative.

He became a member of the Forty-seventh Congress and the chairman of the Committee on Enrolled Bills. However, he served only from March 4 to May 16, 1881, when he and Conkling resigned because of a disagreement with President James Garfield over federal appointments in New York. The cause of their resignations was Garfield's appointment of Robertson, a leader of anti-Conkling forces, as Collector of the Port of New York. Soon afterward, however, Garfield's assassination by Charles J. Guiteau, a self-proclaimed Stalwart who claimed friendships with Platt and Conkling, was the finishing blow for their faction.

Platt's compromise with Depew sparked the cascade of events that resulted in his subsequent defeat. Garfield's nomination of Robertson forced the junior senator to remain loyal to his vows and buck Conkling, or affirm his Stalwart politics and break the promise.

Contrary to narratives both in Platt's time and the present day, which suggest the resignations were an encouragement by Conkling (to which Platt eagerly agreed), it was Platt who suggested the strategy. However, the general perception of Platt as an acolyte of Conkling resulted in his portrayal as a "Me too," "Echo," and "Dromio" of his mentor. A cartoon published by Thomas Nast in Harper's Weekly portrayed the pair as having "lost their heads," with former president Ulysses S. Grant struggling to resurrect Conkling.

=== Half-Breeds outmaneuver Platt ===
The reasoning for the resignations, Platt articulated, functioned as a "desperate remedy" to prevent him from being forced to vote on confirming Robertson to the collector position. He thus would not betray the vows made towards Depew, nor would it act as a direct affront to Conkling.

Platt and Conkling ran in the special election to fill the vacancies created by their own resignations but lost. Anticipations were made that Governor Cornell would alert the state legislature in a prompt announcement of their resignations, although a maneuvering by two Half-Breeds in the state Senate resulted in the chamber's adjourning before the message could be received. The Half-Breed ranks in the state legislature thus gave more time for themselves to devise a strategy that would thwart efforts to re-elect Platt and Conkling; Platt's adviser Louis F. Payn predicted their defeats following the results of the first ballot that fueled pessimism.

The Half-Breeds in the legislature did not look upon Platt as having demonstrated loyalty to his promise, and steadfastly worked to prevent his re-election. A majority in the chambers viewed that Garfield's promotion of Robertson at the opposition of the "regular" machine were not "dishonest" nor "dishonorable."

Allies of Conkling bitterly fought to reinstate them to their seats, including Vice President Chester Arthur, although Platt would withdraw his name from the special election following a month of balloting. The assassination of Garfield resulted in subsequent suspicions toward Stalwarts, and an alliance between Half-Breed and Independents thwarted the "Old Guard" by nominating Warner Miller and Elbridge G. Lapham to succeed Platt and Conkling respectively. The inability of Platt to ensure a successful strategy that only resulted in the self-ousting of the senatorial pair ended his friendship with Conkling.

Eschewing elective office, Platt then devoted his attention to mending fences and rebuilding the machine. He served as a delegate to several state and national Republican conventions, and was a member of the New York Republican State Committee and Republican National Committee. By 1887, Platt was the de facto leader of New York's Republicans, where he developed a reputation as the "easy boss."

== Platt supports Half-Breed Blaine for president ==
During the 1884 United States presidential election, the Republican convention nominated Half-Breed leader James G. Blaine to lead the party ticket. This resulted in an intraparty schism, with a "Mugwump" faction refusing to support Blaine and instead backing Bourbon Democrat Grover Cleveland.

Although Platt had allied with the Stalwarts which fiercely opposed Blaine (who long had a personal rivalry with Conkling), he supported the nominee for the general election. Blaine ultimately lost the race to Cleveland, which in part was attributed to the influence of Harper's Weekly Mugwump cartoonist Thomas Nast.

== Founding Trustee of New York Law School ==
Platt was one of the original members of New York Law School's Board of Trustees. Founded in 1891, the law school was founded by Theodore William Dwight and other faculty members and students of Columbia Law School who rejected Columbia's application of the Casebook method of legal instruction because it downplayed practical lawyering skills.

== Return to the Senate, 1897–1909 ==
Sixteen years after Platt's resignation, he was elected a second time as a U.S. Senator from New York in January 1897 and was re-elected in January 1903. This time, he served from March 4, 1897, to March 3, 1909. He was Chairman of the Committee on Transportation Routes to the Seaboard (in the 55th Congress). He was on the Committee on Printing (in the 56th through 60th Congresses), the Committee on Cuban Relations (in the 59th Congress) and the Committee on Interoceanic Canals (in the 59th Congress). He also served on the Republican National Committee.

On January 21, 1897, Platt's photograph appeared in the New York Tribune as "the first halftone reproduction to appear in a mass circulation daily paper," according to Time-Life's Photojournalism.

To increase his power as a political boss, Platt steered passage of the Greater New York bill in 1898. The bill incorporated the boroughs of Brooklyn, Queens, and Staten Island into the city, thereby creating New York City as it exists today.

Platt reluctantly supported Theodore Roosevelt's candidacy for Governor of New York in 1898 in the immediate aftermath of Roosevelt's fame leading the Rough Riders in the Spanish–American War earlier that year. Once elected, Governor Roosevelt was independently minded and crusaded against machines and corruption, most notably refusing to reappoint Louis F. Payn as state Insurance Superintendent because he was widely seen as a corrupt associate of Platt. In response, Platt sought a way to "shelve" Roosevelt so that a more compliant governor could be installed in his place. President William McKinley's original vice president had died in office, leaving a place on the ticket to fill before the 1900 election. At the 1900 Republican National Convention, Platt and Matthew Quay proposed to get Roosevelt out of Platt's way in New York by nominating him for vice president. Party boss Mark Hanna was horrified by the proposition, stating "Why, everybody's gone crazy! What is the matter with all of you? Here's this convention going headlong for Roosevelt for Vice President. Don't any of you realize that there's only one life between that madman and the Presidency? Platt and Quay are no better than idiots! What harm can he do as Governor of New York compared to the damage he will do as President if McKinley should die?" But since Hanna was unable to convince President McKinley to refuse Roosevelt as his Vice President, his efforts were in vain. Roosevelt was chosen by acclamation, played a major part in McKinley's re-election, and became president in September 1901 after McKinley was assassinated in office.

Platt's control over the Republican Party in New York State effectively ended in 1902. Benjamin Barker Odell Jr., Roosevelt's successor as governor, had not only acted independently of Platt but also, by 1902, insisted on taking over from Platt as leader of the party. After Platt tried but failed to block Odell's renomination as governor and Odell was re-elected, the era of a separate "boss" was over.

Platt was a member of the New York Society of Colonial Wars.

== Later years, death, and legacy ==
Two years after his first wife died in 1901, he married Lillian Janeway, whom the New York Times described as "young enough in appearance to pass for his daughter." Their legal separation was announced in 1906, with Platt agreeing to pay his estranged wife $75,000 in exchange for her dropping all financial claims upon him and dismissing a suit for divorce which had been previously filed.

During his final years Platt suffered from a palsy of his legs which confined him to a wheelchair for a majority of the time. He retired from the Senate in 1909 and was stricken by what was diagnosed as an acute attack of Bright's disease on May 28, 1909, a case so severe that his doctor publicly predicted his patient's imminent demise. Platt recovered, however, convalescing until late in January 1910, when he was deemed well enough to return home to his Manhattan apartment.

Seemingly restored to health, Platt was suddenly stricken by a second attack of kidney disease at about 1 pm on March 6, 1910. His personal physician was called, but it was immediately deemed apparent that there would be no recovery in this second life-threatening incident. Platt died in his own bed at about 4 pm on that same day.

On March 7, Republican Governor Charles Evans Hughes ordered flags of state buildings to be flown at half-staff in commemoration of the death of the former United States Senator, an action setting a precedent in New York of state government honoring such a former federal elected official in that manner.

Platt's body was interred in Evergreen Cemetery in Owego, New York. At the time of his death, he remained married to Lillian, but she received nothing in his will.

His namesake great-grandson was the lawyer and judge Thomas Collier Platt Jr.

== Bibliography ==
- Dunn, Arthur Wallace (1922). From Harrison to Harding: A Personal Narrative, Covering a Third of a Century, 1888-1921. Vol. 1. New York: G.P. Putnam's Sons.
- L. J. Lang (editor), The Autobiography of Thomas Collier Platt, (New York, 1910)
- Dictionary of American Biography;
- Gosnell, Harold Foote (1924). Boss Platt and His New York Machine: A Study of the Political Leadership of Thomas C. Platt, Theodore Roosevelt, and Others. The University of Chicago Press.
- AMS Press, 1969; Platt, Thomas Collier. The Autobiography of Thomas Collier Platt. Edited by Louis J. Lang. 1910. Reprint. New York: Arno Press, 1974.
- Texts on Wikisource:
  - Carl Schurz, "Wanted — A Republican Form of Government," Harper's Weekly, April 10, 1897.
  - Carl Schurz, "The Right to Nominate," Harper's Weekly, July 3, 1897.
  - Carl Schurz, "Partisan Municipal Government," Harper's Weekly, July 31, 1897.
  - Carl Schurz, "Bossism in New York," Harper's Weekly, November 13, 1897.
  - "Platt, Thomas Collier". Appletons' Cyclopædia of American Biography. 1900.
  - "Senator Platt Did Not Dine with Governor Odell," The New York Times, August 1, 1901.
  - "Platt, Thomas Collier". New International Encyclopedia. 1905.
  - "Platt, Thomas Collier". Encyclopædia Britannica (11th ed.). 1911.
- United States Congress. "Thomas C. Platt (id: P000383)". Biographical Directory of the United States Congress.

U.S. House of Representatives
Preceded by Horace B. Smith	Member of the U.S. House of Representatives from New York's 27th congressional district 1873–1875	Succeeded by Elbridge G. Lapham
Preceded by Horace B. Smith	Member of the U.S. House of Representatives from New York's 28th congressional district 1875–1877	Succeeded by Jeremiah W. Dwight
U.S. Senate
Preceded by Francis Kernan	U.S. senator (Class 1) from New York; 1881; Served alongside: Roscoe Conkling	Succeeded by Warner Miller
Preceded by David B. Hill	U.S. senator (Class 3) from New York; 1897–1909; Served alongside: Edward Murphy Jr., Chauncey M. Depew	Succeeded by Elihu Root
