= 1898–99 United States Senate elections =

- January 25, 1898 – April 19, 1899
- Class 1

30 of the 90 seats in the United States Senate (as well as special elections) 46 seats needed for a majority
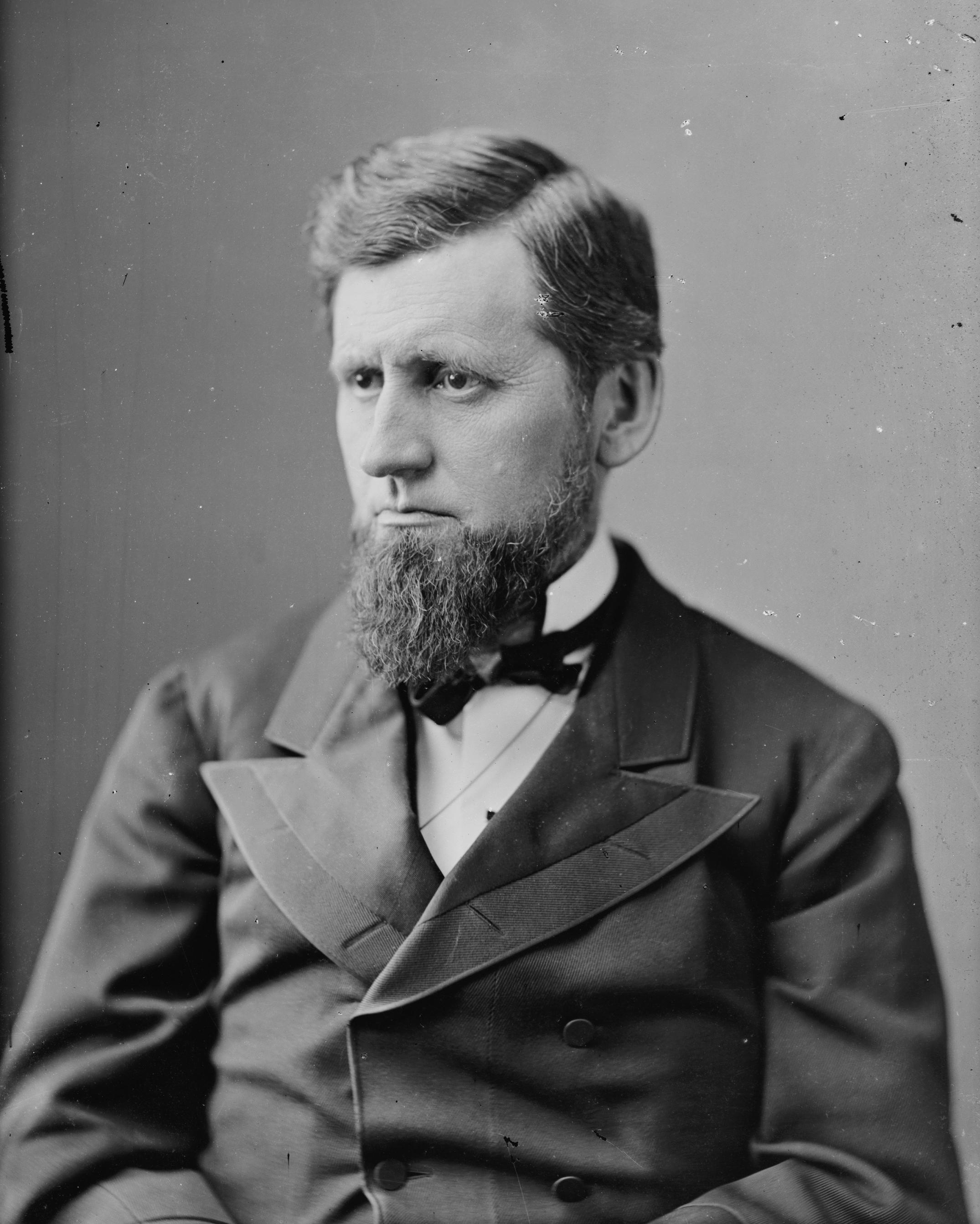

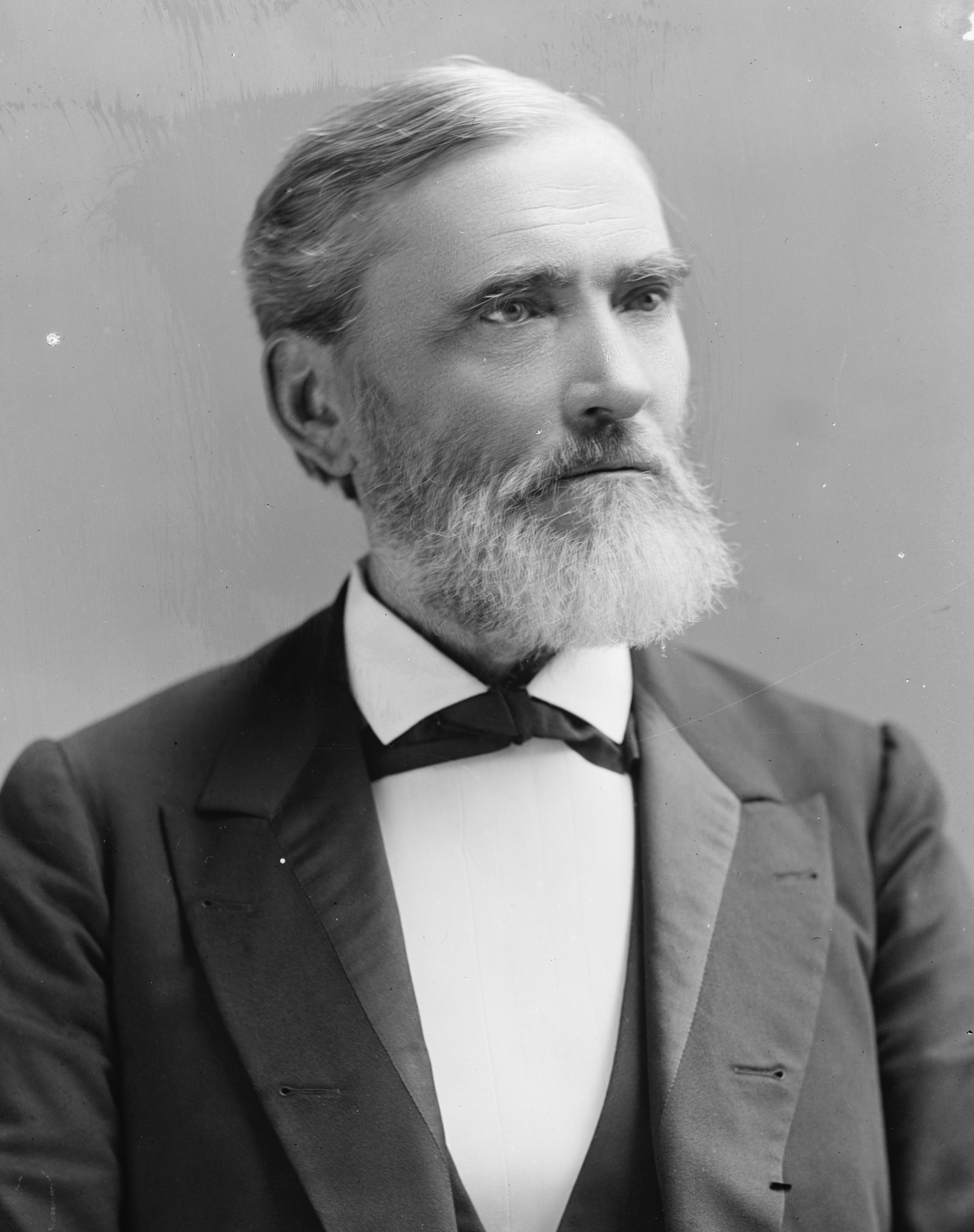
	Majority party	Minority party
Leader	William B. Allison	David Turpie (Lost re-election)
Party	Republican	Democratic
Leader since	March 4, 1897	March 4, 1897
Leader's seat	Iowa	Indiana
Seats before	43	35
Seats after	51	27
Seat change	▲8	▼8
Seats up	11	15
Races won	17	6
	Third party	Fourth party
Party	Populist	Silver Republican
Seats before	5	4
Seats after	4	2
Seat change	▼1	▼2
Seats up	1	2
Races won	0	0
	Fifth party
Party	Silver
Seats before	2
Seats after	2
Seat change	Steady
Seats up	1
Races won	1
- Results of the elections: Democratic gain Democratic hold Republican gain Republican hold Silver hold Legislature failed to elect
Majority Party before election
Republican
Elected Majority Party
Republican

The 1898–99 United States Senate elections were held on various dates in various states. As these U.S. Senate elections were prior to the ratification of the Seventeenth Amendment in 1913, senators were chosen by state legislatures. Senators were elected over a wide range of time throughout 1898 and 1899, and a seat may have been filled months late or remained vacant due to legislative deadlock. In these elections, terms were up for the senators in Class 1.

== Events of the election ==
The Republican Party gained eight seats at the expense of the Democrats and several minor third parties. The Democrats saw strong gains in the concurrent 1898 House of Representatives elections. However, this group of Senators were last up for election in 1892, since which a major political realignment had occurred. Many state legislatures in the Northern United States that had been controlled by Democrats during the third party system had flipped in the Republican wave years of 1894 and 1896, resulting in the huge number of seats the party gained in 1898.

The Democrats flipped a Silver Republican held seat in Montana while Republicans flipped a Populist held seat in Nebraska. In North Dakota, Wisconsin, Indiana, West Virginia, Maryland, New York, and New Jersey, Republicans flipped Democratic held seats.

A large number of state legislatures failed to fill their Senators during this election cycle: in Utah, a Silver Republican failed to secure re-election; in Delaware and California, a Democrat did so; in Pennsylvania, a Republican seat was lost.

In Nebraska and Florida, senators were elected shortly after the beginning of the 56th Congress on March 4.

In Oregon, a special election was held to fill a vacant seat.These elections reflected the continuing national realignment sparked by the Panic of 1893, which shifted political power in many state legislatures toward the Republicans.

The results also underscored the influence of emerging third parties, as Populist and Silver factions affected legislative outcomes in several western states.

== Results summary ==
Senate party division, 56th Congress (1899–1901)

- Majority party: Republican (52)
- Minority party: Democratic (25)
- Other parties: Populist (4); Silver Republican (2); Silver (2)
- Vacant: 5
- Total seats: 90

== Change in composition ==
=== Before the elections ===
After the October 7, 1898 special election in Oregon.

					D_{1}	D_{2}	D_{3}	D_{4}	D_{5}
D_{15}	D_{14}	D_{13}	D_{12}	D_{11}	D_{10}	D_{9}	D_{8}	D_{7}	D_{6}
D_{16}	D_{17}	D_{18}	D_{19}	D_{20} Ran	D_{21} Ran	D_{22} Ran	D_{23} Ran	D_{24} Ran	D_{25} Ran
P_{5} Ran	D_{34} Retired	D_{33} Retired	D_{32} Retired	D_{31} Retired	D_{30} Ran	D_{29} Ran	D_{28} Ran	D_{27} Ran	D_{26} Ran
P_{4}	P_{3}	P_{2}	P_{1}	S_{2}	S_{1}	SR_{1}	SR_{2}	SR_{3} Ran	SR_{4} Ran
Plurality ↓									SR_{5} Ran
R_{36} Ran	R_{37} Ran	R_{38} Ran	R_{39} Ran	R_{40} Ran	R_{41} Ran	R_{42} Ran	R_{43} Ran	R_{44} Ran	SR_{5} Ran
R_{35} Ran	R_{34} Ran	R_{33}	R_{32}	R_{31}	R_{30}	R_{29}	R_{28}	R_{27}	R_{26}
R_{16}	R_{17}	R_{18}	R_{19}	R_{20}	R_{21}	R_{22}	R_{23}	R_{24}	R_{25}
R_{15}	R_{14}	R_{13}	R_{12}	R_{11}	R_{10}	R_{9}	R_{8}	R_{7}	R_{6}
					R_{1}	R_{2}	R_{3}	R_{4}	R_{5}

=== Result of the general elections ===
					D_{1}	D_{2}	D_{3}	D_{4}	D_{5}
D_{15}	D_{14}	D_{13}	D_{12}	D_{11}	D_{10}	D_{9}	D_{8}	D_{7}	D_{6}
D_{16}	D_{17}	D_{18}	D_{19}	D_{20} Re-elected	D_{21} Re-elected	D_{22} Re-elected	D_{23} Re-elected	D_{24} Hold	D_{25} Gain from SR
R_{50} Gain from D	SR_{3} Re-elected	SR_{2}	SR_{1}	S_{1}	S_{2}	P_{1}	P_{2}	P_{3}	P_{4}
R_{49} Gain from D	R_{48} Gain from D	R_{47} Gain from D	R_{46} Gain from D	R_{45} Gain from D	R_{44} Gain from D	R_{43} Hold	V_{1} D Loss	V_{2} D Loss	V_{3} D Loss
Majority →						R_{43} Hold	V_{1} D Loss	V_{2} D Loss	V_{3} D Loss
Majority →						R_{42} Re-elected	V_{6} R Loss	V_{5} SR Loss	V_{4} P Loss
R_{36} Re-elected	R_{37} Re-elected	R_{38} Re-elected	R_{39} Re-elected	R_{40} Re-elected	R_{41} Re-elected	R_{42} Re-elected	V_{6} R Loss	V_{5} SR Loss	V_{4} P Loss
R_{35} Re-elected	R_{34} Re-elected	R_{33}	R_{32}	R_{31}	R_{30}	R_{29}	R_{28}	R_{27}	R_{26}
R_{16}	R_{17}	R_{18}	R_{19}	R_{20}	R_{21}	R_{22}	R_{23}	R_{24}	R_{25}
R_{15}	R_{14}	R_{13}	R_{12}	R_{11}	R_{10}	R_{9}	R_{8}	R_{7}	R_{6}
					R_{1}	R_{2}	R_{3}	R_{4}	R_{5}

=== Beginning of the next Congress ===
					D_{1}	D_{2}	D_{3}	D_{4}	D_{5}
D_{15}	D_{14}	D_{13}	D_{12}	D_{11}	D_{10}	D_{9}	D_{8}	D_{7}	D_{6}
D_{16}	D_{17}	D_{18}	D_{19}	D_{20}	D_{21}	D_{22}	D_{23}	D_{24}	D_{25}
SR_{3}	SR_{2}	SR_{1}	S_{1}	S_{2}	P_{1}	P_{2}	P_{3}	P_{4}	D_{26} Appointed
R_{50}	R_{49}	R_{48}	R_{47}	R_{46}	R_{45}	R_{44}	V_{1}	V_{2}	V_{3}
Majority →						R_{43}	V_{1}	V_{2}	V_{3}
Majority →						R_{43}	V_{1}	V_{5}	V_{4}
R_{36}	R_{37}	R_{38}	R_{39}	R_{40}	R_{41}	R_{42}	V_{1}	V_{5}	V_{4}
R_{35}	R_{34}	R_{33}	R_{32}	R_{31}	R_{30}	R_{29}	R_{28}	R_{27}	R_{26}
R_{16}	R_{17}	R_{18}	R_{19}	R_{20}	R_{21}	R_{22}	R_{23}	R_{24}	R_{25}
R_{15}	R_{14}	R_{13}	R_{12}	R_{11}	R_{10}	R_{9}	R_{8}	R_{7}	R_{6}
					R_{1}	R_{2}	R_{3}	R_{4}	R_{5}

Key:

D_{#}	Democratic
P_{#}	Populist
R_{#}	Republican
S_{#}	Silver
SR_{#}	Silver Republican
V_{#}	Vacant

== Race summaries ==
=== Elections during the 55th Congress ===
In these elections, the winners were seated during 1898 or in 1899 before March 4; ordered by election date.

State	Incumbent			Results	Candidates
State	Senator	Party	Electoral history	Results	Candidates
Ohio (Class 1)	Mark Hanna	Republican	1897 (Appointed)	Interim appointee elected January 12, 1898. Winner also elected to the next term; see below.	▌ ✓ Mark Hanna (Republican) 73; ▌Robert McKisson (Republican) 70; ▌John J. Lentz (Democratic) 1
Oregon (Class 3)	Vacant			Legislature had failed to elect. New senator elected October 7, 1898. Republican gain.	▌ ✓ Joseph Simon (Republican); [data missing]

=== Races leading to the 56th Congress ===
In these regular elections, the winners were elected for the term beginning March 4, 1899; ordered by state.

All of the elections involved the Class 1 seats.

State	Incumbent			Results	Candidates
State	Senator	Party	Electoral history	Results	Candidates
California	Stephen M. White	Democratic	1893	Incumbent retired. Legislature failed to elect. Democratic loss. Seat remained vacant until February 7, 1900.	▌Ulysses S. Grant Jr. (Republican); ▌Daniel M. Burns (Republican); ▌Stephen M. White (Democratic); ▌Robert N. Bulla (Republican); ▌W. H. L. Barnes (Republican)
Connecticut	Joseph R. Hawley	Republican	1881; 1887; 1893	Incumbent re-elected January 17, 1899.	▌ ✓ Joseph R. Hawley (Republican); ▌Daniel N. Morgan (Democratic)
Delaware	George Gray	Democratic	1885 (special); 1887; 1893	Legislature failed to elect. Democratic loss. Seat remained vacant until 1903.	▌George Gray (Democratic) [data missing]
Florida	Samuel Pasco	Democratic	1887; 1893 (failure to elect); 1893 (appointed); 1893 (special)	Legislature failed to elect. Democratic loss. Incumbent appointed to begin the term. Incumbent lost election to finish the term; see below.	[data missing]
Indiana	David Turpie	Democratic	1863 (special); 1863 (retired); 1887; 1893	Incumbent lost re-election. New senator elected January 17, 1899. Republican gain.	▌ ✓ Albert J. Beveridge (Republican); ▌David Turpie (Democratic); [data missing]
Maine	Eugene Hale	Republican	1881; 1887; 1893	Incumbent re-elected.	First ballot (January 17, 1899): ▌ ✓ Eugene Hale (Republican) 84 H; 27 S; ▌Samuel Lowell Lord (Democratic) 15 H; 0 S; ▌Absent 51 H; 4 S
Maryland	Arthur P. Gorman	Democratic	1880; 1886; 1892	Incumbent lost re-election. New senator elected January 25, 1898. Republican gain.	▌ ✓ Louis E. McComas (Republican) 63; ▌Arthur P. Gorman (Democratic) 47; ▌[FNU] Shaw (Republican) 4
Massachusetts	Henry Cabot Lodge	Republican	1893	Incumbent re-elected in 1899.	▌ ✓ Henry Cabot Lodge (Republican); ▌[FNU] Bruce (Democratic); ▌P. Porter Winfield (Social Democratic)
Michigan	Julius C. Burrows	Republican	1895 (special)	Incumbent re-elected in 1899.	▌ ✓ Julius C. Burrows (Republican); [data missing]
Minnesota	Cushman Davis	Republican	1886; 1892	Incumbent re-elected January 18, 1899.	▌ ✓ Cushman Davis (Republican); [data missing]
Mississippi	Hernando Money	Democratic	1897 (appointed)	Interim appointee elected in 1899.	▌ ✓ Hernando Money (Democratic); [data missing]
Missouri	Francis Cockrell	Democratic	1874; 1881; 1887; 1893	Incumbent re-elected January 19, 1899.	▌ ✓ Francis Cockrell (Democratic); [data missing]
Montana	Lee Mantle	Silver; Republican	1895 (special)	Incumbent lost renomination. New senator elected in 1899. Democratic gain.	▌ ✓ William A. Clark (Democratic); [data missing]
Nebraska	William V. Allen	Populist	1893	Legislature failed to elect. Populist loss. The seat was filled in March 1899; see below.	▌William V. Allen (Populist)
Nevada	William M. Stewart	Silver; Republican	1887; 1893	Incumbent re-elected January 24, 1899.	▌ ✓ William M. Stewart (Silver Republican) 24; ▌Abner C. Cleveland (Republican) 6; ▌W. W. Williams (Republican) 10; ▌N. H. A. Mason (Unknown) 3; ▌William Woodburn (Republican) 1
New Jersey	James Smith Jr.	Democratic	1893	Incumbent lost re-election. New senator elected January 24, 1899. Republican gain.	▌ ✓ John Kean (Republican) 51 votes; ▌James Smith Jr. (Democratic) 29 votes
New York	Edward Murphy Jr.	Democratic	1893	Incumbent lost re-election. New senator elected January 17, 1899. Republican gain.	▌ ✓ Chauncey Depew (Republican); ▌Edward Murphy Jr. (Democratic)
North Dakota	William N. Roach	Democratic	1893	Incumbent lost re-election. New senator elected January 20, 1899. Republican gain.	▌ ✓ Porter J. McCumber (Republican); ▌William N. Roach (Democratic); [data missing]
Ohio	Mark Hanna	Republican	1897 (appointed)	Interim appointee elected January 12, 1898. Winner also elected to finish the term; see above.	▌ ✓ Mark Hanna (Republican) 73 votes; ▌Robert McKisson (Republican) 70 votes; ▌John J. Lentz (Democratic) 1 vote
Pennsylvania	Matthew S. Quay	Republican	1887; 1893	Legislature failed to elect. Republican loss. Incumbent appointed to start the term, but Senate rejected credentials. Seat remained vacant until 1901.	▌Matthew S. Quay (Republican)
Rhode Island	Nelson W. Aldrich	Republican	1881 (special); 1886; 1892	Incumbent re-elected in 1898.	▌ ✓ Nelson W. Aldrich (Republican); [data missing]
Tennessee	William B. Bate	Democratic	1887; 1893	Incumbent re-elected in 1899.	▌ ✓ William B. Bate (Democratic); [data missing]
Texas	Roger Q. Mills	Democratic	1892 (special); 1893	Incumbent retired. New senator elected January 24, 1899. Democratic hold.	▌ ✓ Charles Culberson (Democratic); Unopposed
Utah	Frank J. Cannon	Silver; Republican	1896	Legislature failed to elect. Silver Republican loss. Seat remained vacant until 1901.	▌Frank J. Cannon (Republican); ▌Alfred W. McCune (Democratic)
Vermont	Redfield Proctor	Republican	1891 (appointed); 1892 (special); 1892	Incumbent re-elected October 19, 1898.	▌ ✓ Redfield Proctor (Republican); ▌Thomas W. Moloney (Democratic)
Virginia	John W. Daniel	Democratic	1887; 1893	Incumbent re-elected in 1899.	▌ ✓ John W. Daniel (Democratic); [data missing]
Washington	John L. Wilson	Republican	1895 (special)	Incumbent lost renomination. New senator elected February 1, 1899. Republican hold.	▌ ✓ Addison G. Foster (Republican); [data missing]
West Virginia	Charles J. Faulkner	Democratic	1887; 1893	Incumbent retired. New senator elected January 25, 1899. Republican gain.	▌ ✓ Nathan B. Scott (Republican) 48; ▌J. F. McGraw (Democratic) 46; ▌Nathan Goff Jr. (Republican) 1
Wisconsin	John L. Mitchell	Democratic	1893	Incumbent retired. New senator elected January 31, 1899. Republican gain.	▌ ✓ Joseph V. Quarles (Republican) 85.94%; ▌Timothy E. Ryan (Democratic) 14.06%
Wyoming	Clarence D. Clark	Republican	1895 (special)	Incumbent re-elected January 24, 1899.	▌ ✓ Clarence D. Clark (Republican); ▌John Eugene Osborne (Democratic)

=== Elections during the 56th Congress ===
In these elections, the winners were elected in 1899 after March 4, and seated in the 56th Congress.

State	Incumbent			Results	Candidates
State	Senator	Party	Electoral history	Results	Candidates
Nebraska (Class 1)	Vacant			Legislature had failed to elect; see above. New senator elected late March 8, 1899. Republican gain.	▌ ✓ Monroe Hayward (Republican) 74; ▌William V. Allen (Populist) 58
Florida (Class 1)	Samuel Pasco	Democratic	1887; 1893 (failure to elect); 1893 (appointed); 1893 (special); 1899 (failure to elect); 1899 (appointed)	Interim appointee lost election to finish the term. New senator elected April 19, 1899. Democratic hold.	▌ ✓ James Taliaferro (Democratic); ▌Samuel Pasco (Democratic)

In this election, the winner was seated in the 57th Congress, starting March 4, 1901.

State	Incumbent			Results	Candidates
State	Senator	Party	Electoral history	Results	Candidates
Virginia (Class 2)	Thomas S. Martin	Democratic	1893 (early)	Incumbent re-elected early December 19, 1899 for the term beginning March 4, 1901.	▌ ✓ Thomas S. Martin (Democratic); [data missing]

== Maryland ==
1898 United States Senate election in Maryland
- 1898

80 members of the Maryland General Assembly
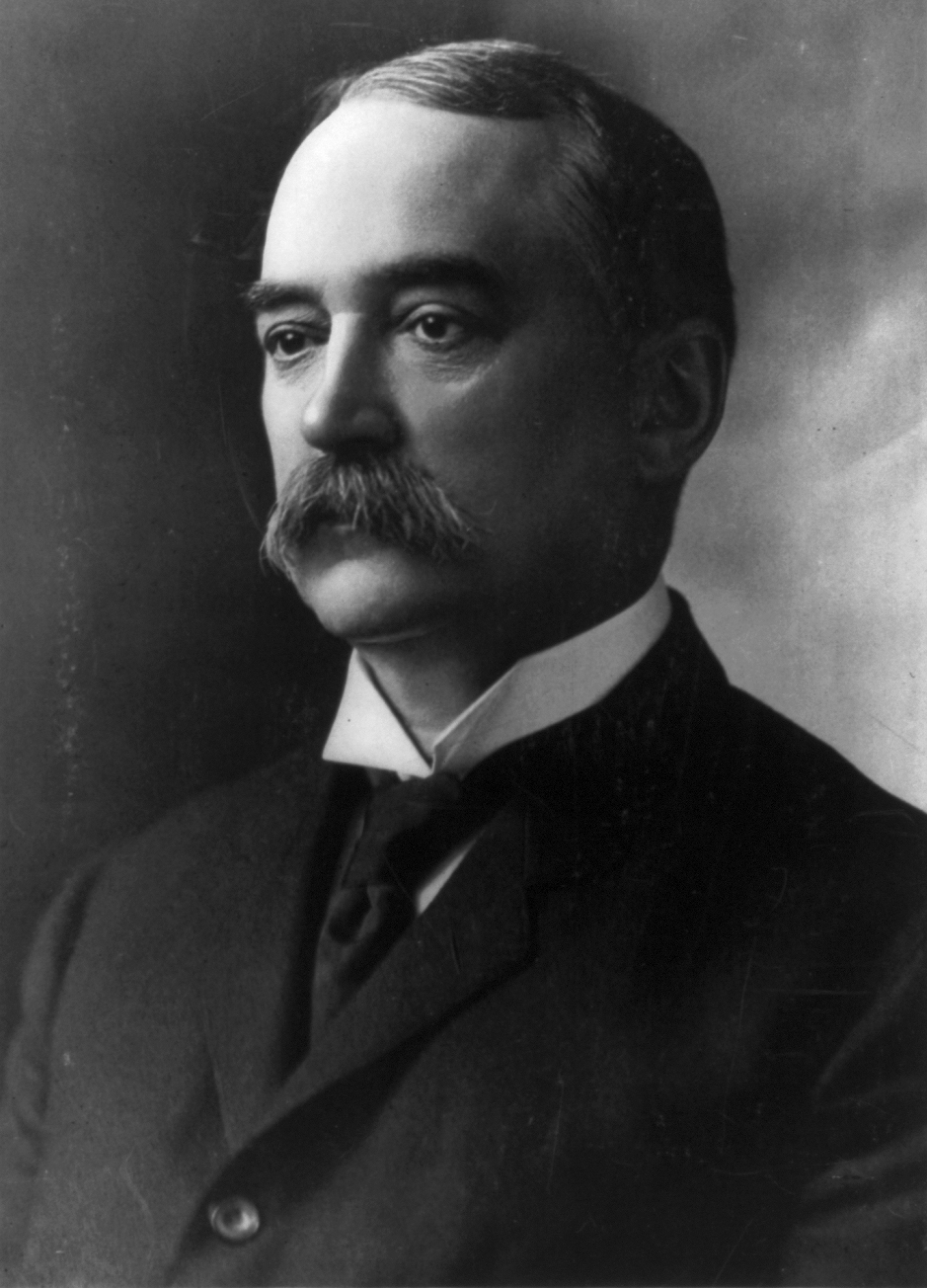
Candidate	Louis E. McComas
Party	Republican
Legislative vote	80
Percentage	93.02%

Louis E. McComas won election by an unknown margin of votes for the Class 1 seat.

== New York ==
The election in New York was held January 17, 1899.

Democrat Edward Murphy Jr. had been elected to this seat in 1893, and his term would expire on March 3, 1899. At the State election in November 1898, 27 Republicans and 23 Democrats were elected for a two-year term (1899–1900) in the State Senate; and 88 Republicans and 62 Democrats were elected for the session of 1899 to the Assembly. The 122nd New York State Legislature met from January 4 to April 28, 1899, at Albany, New York.

The Republican caucus met on January 12. State Senator Hobart Krum presided. They nominated Chauncey M. Depew unanimously. Depew had been Secretary of State of New York from 1864 to 1865, and was the frontrunning candidate to succeed Thomas C. Platt at the U.S. Senate special election in 1881 when he withdrew after the 41st ballot. Parallel to his political career, he moved up the ladder in the Vanderbilt Railroad System, being President of the New York Central and Hudson River Railroad from 1885 to 1898, and holding positions in dozens of other railroad companies.

The Democratic caucus met also on January 12. State Senator George W. Plunkitt presided. They re-nominated the incumbent U.S. Senator Edward Murphy Jr. unanimously.

Chauncey M. Depew was the choice of both the Assembly and the State Senate, and was declared elected.

1899 United States Senator election result
House	Republican		Democratic	
State Senate (50 members)	✓ Chauncey M. Depew	27	Edward Murphy Jr.	23
State Assembly (150 members)	✓ Chauncey M. Depew	84	Edward Murphy Jr.	60

Note: The votes were cast on January 17, but both Houses met in a joint session on January 18 to compare nominations, and declare the result.

== Utah ==
In mid-August 1898, Alfred W. McCune decided to seek office as a Democrat for the United States Senate. State legislators had already indicated they would not support the incumbent, Frank J. Cannon for reelection. Cannon, a Republican, had voted against the Dingley Act, which would have raised tariffs on sugar and helped the Utah sugar industry. The Dingley bill was strongly supported by the LDS Church hierarchy, who now opposed his reelection. Other factors were his support for Free Silver; rumors about immoral acts he may have committed while living in Washington, D.C.; and that the Utah legislature was controlled by Democrats. The McCunes were close friends with Heber J. Grant, seventh LDS Church president and an ordained LDS apostle. Although the LDS church had (just weeks before) made a decision to stay out of state politics, McCune asked Grant for the church's assistance in winning office. Grant consulted with Joseph F. Smith (Apostle and sixth LDS president) and John Henry Smith (a member of the Quorum of the Twelve Apostles and the First Presidency of the LDS Church), both of whom supported McCune's senatorial bid. But McCune was not alone in seeking the office. Former Representative William H. King was also running (and backed by two Apostles), as was James Moyle (a prominent attorney and founder of the Utah Democratic Party who was backed by state legislators) and George Q. Cannon (an Apostle and member of the First Presidency).

At the time, members of the Senate were still elected by their respective state legislatures. The Utah state legislature convened in January 1899. There were 13 Republicans and 50 Democrats in the state legislature. From the beginning, McCune was considered the leading candidate. But the legislature quickly deadlocked over the election. One-hundred and twenty-one ballots were cast, and no winner emerged. McCune was one or two votes shy of winning on several ballots. on February 18, before the 122nd ballot, state representative Albert A. Law (a Republican from Cache County and a Cannon supporter) claimed McCune offered him $1,500 for his vote. McCune strenuously denied the charge, and a seven-member legislative established to investigate the allegation. The committee voted 7-to-2 to absolve McCune of the charge, and this outcome was announced to the legislature on March 6. Balloting resumed, and on March 8, on the 149th ballot, McCune still lacked enough votes to win office (he had only 25 votes). The legislature adjourned without having chosen a senator, and McCune traveled in Europe for several weeks to regain his health (returning in June 1899).

Utah's U.S. Senate seat remained vacant until January 1901.

== See also ==
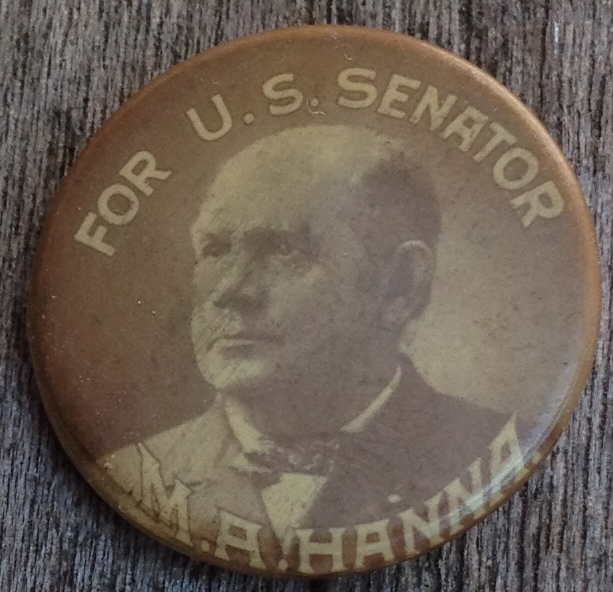
Mark Hanna campaign button in Ohio

- 1898 United States elections
  - 1898 United States House of Representatives elections
- 55th United States Congress
- 56th United States Congress
