= 1892–93 United States Senate elections =

- Dates vary by state
- Class 1

29 of the 88 seats in the United States Senate (as well as special elections) 45 seats needed for a majority
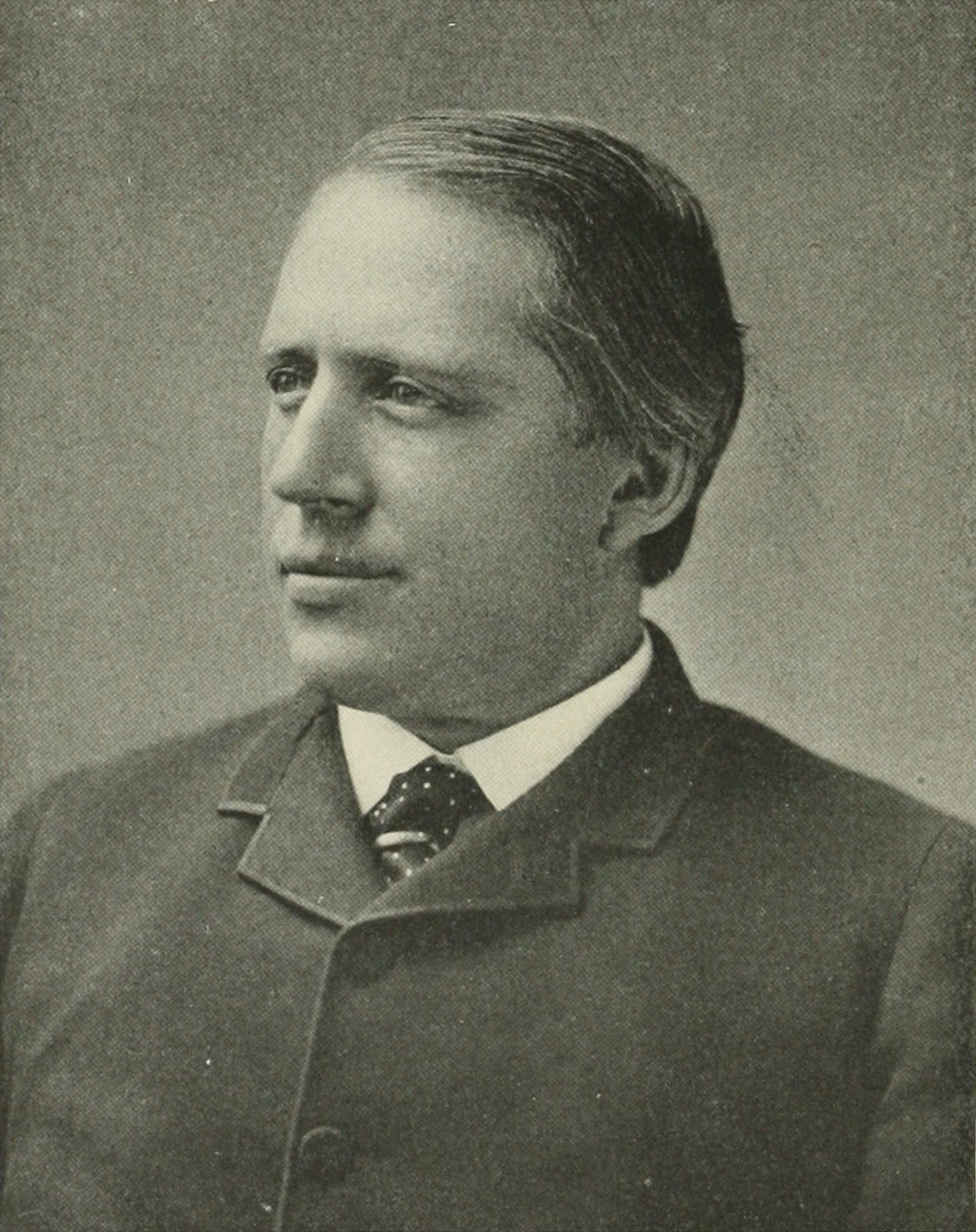

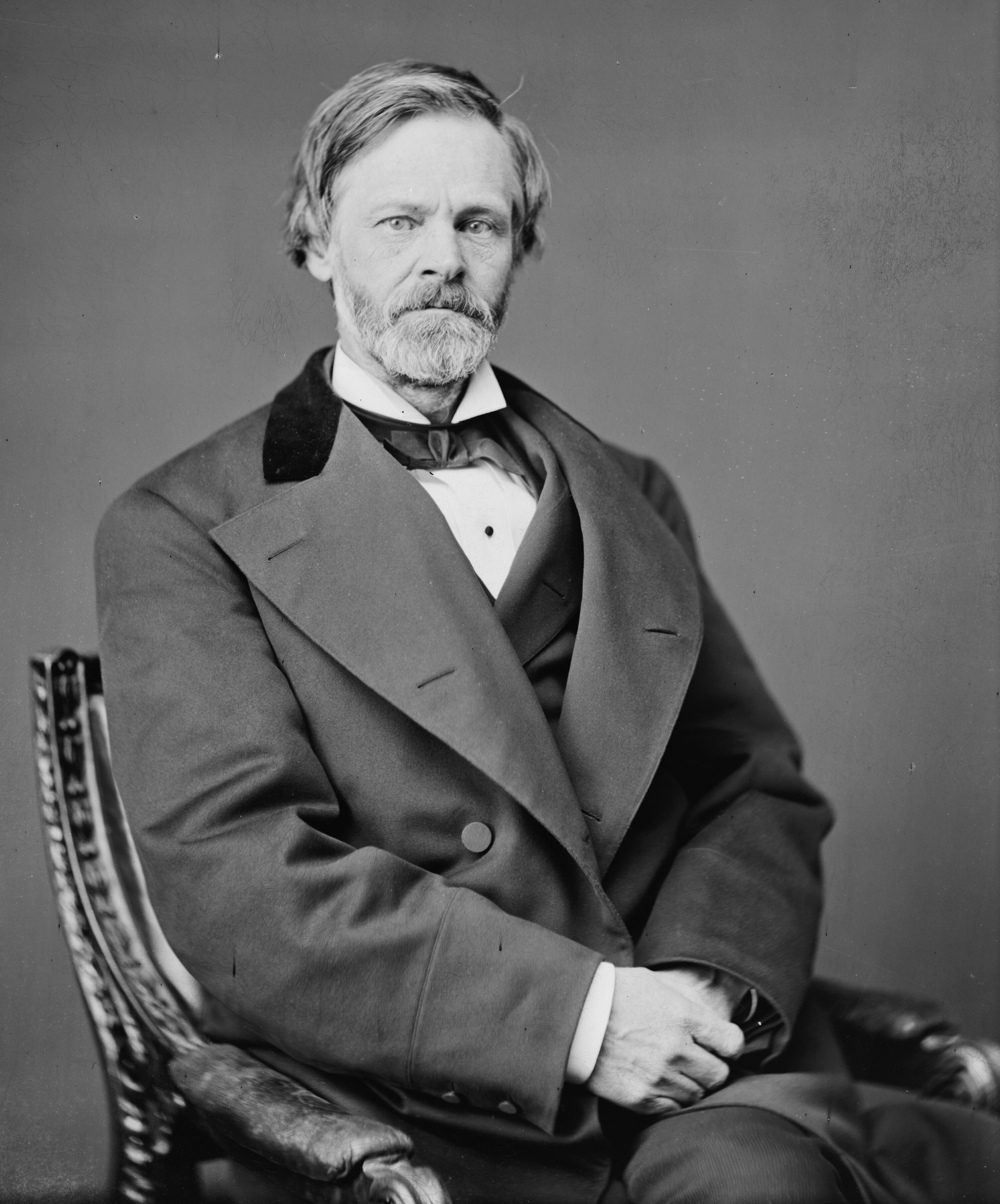
	Majority party	Minority party
Leader	Arthur Pue Gorman (Note: as Democratic Caucus Chair)	John Sherman (Note: as Republican Conference Chair)
Party	Democratic	Republican
Leader since	March 4, 1889	March 4, 1891
Leader's seat	Maryland	Ohio
Seats before	39	47
Seats won	14	9
Seats after	43	37
Seat change	▲4	▼10
Seats up	11	18
	Third party	Fourth party
Party	Populist	Silver
Seats before	2	New party
Seats won	1	1
Seats after	3	1
Seat change	▲1	▲1
Seats up	0	Steady
- Results of the elections: Democratic gain Democratic hold Republican hold Silver gain Populist gain Legislature failed to elect
Majority Party before election
Republican
Elected Majority Party
Democratic

The 1892–93 United States Senate elections were held on various dates in various states, coinciding with former Democratic President Grover Cleveland's return to power. As these U.S. Senate elections were prior to the ratification of the Seventeenth Amendment in 1913, senators were chosen by state legislatures. Senators were elected over a wide range of time throughout 1892 and 1893, and a seat may have been filled months late or remained vacant due to legislative deadlock. In these elections, terms were up for the senators in Class 1.

The Republican Party lost nine seats, losing its majority to the Democratic Party. The Democratic majority, however, was minimal and did not last past the next Congress.

== Results summary ==
Senate party division, 53rd Congress (1893–1895)

- Majority party: Democratic (43)
- Minority party: Republican (37)
- Other parties: Populist (3); Silver (1)
- Vacant: 4
- Total seats: 88

== Change in Senate composition ==
=== Before the elections ===
						D_{1}	D_{2}	D_{3}	D_{4}
D_{14}	D_{13}	D_{12}	D_{11}	D_{10}	D_{9}	D_{8}	D_{7}	D_{6}	D_{5}
D_{15}	D_{16}	D_{17}	D_{18}	D_{19}	D_{20}	D_{21}	D_{22}	D_{23}	D_{24}
D_{34} Ran	D_{33} Ran	D_{32} Ran	D_{31} Ran	D_{30} Ran	D_{29}	D_{28}	D_{27}	D_{26}	D_{25}
D_{35} Ran	D_{36} Ran	D_{37} Ran	D_{38} Ran	D_{39} Unknown	D_{40} Retired	P_{1}	P_{2}	R_{46} Wis. Retired	R_{45} Retired
Majority →									R_{44} Retired
R_{35} Ran	R_{36} Ran	R_{37} Ran	R_{38} Ran	R_{39} Ran	R_{40} Ran	R_{41} Unknown	R_{42} Unknown	R_{43} Retired	R_{44} Retired
R_{34} Ran	R_{33} Ran	R_{32} Ran	R_{31} Ran	R_{30} Ran	R_{29} Ran	R_{28}	R_{27}	R_{26}	R_{25}
R_{15}	R_{16}	R_{17}	R_{18}	R_{19}	R_{20}	R_{21}	R_{22}	R_{23}	R_{24}
R_{14}	R_{13}	R_{12}	R_{11}	R_{10}	R_{9}	R_{8}	R_{7}	R_{6}	R_{5}
						R_{1}	R_{2}	R_{3}	R_{4}

=== Result of the elections ===
						D_{1}	D_{2}	D_{3}	D_{4}
D_{14}	D_{13}	D_{12}	D_{11}	D_{10}	D_{9}	D_{8}	D_{7}	D_{6}	D_{5}
D_{15}	D_{16}	D_{17}	D_{18}	D_{19}	D_{20}	D_{21}	D_{22}	D_{23}	D_{24}
D_{34} Re-elected	D_{33} Re-elected	D_{32} Re-elected	D_{31} Re-elected	D_{30} Re-elected	D_{29}	D_{28}	D_{27}	D_{26}	D_{25}
D_{35} Re-elected	D_{36} Re-elected	D_{37} Re-elected	D_{38} Hold	D_{39} Hold	D_{30} Gain	D_{41} Gain	D_{42} Gain	D_{43} Wis. Gain	V_{4} D loss
Majority with vacancies ↑									V_{3} R loss
R_{35} Re-elected	R_{36} Re-elected	R_{37} Hold	S_{1} Gain	P_{1}	P_{2}	P_{3} Gain	V_{1} R loss	V_{2} R loss	V_{3} R loss
R_{34} Re-elected	R_{33} Re-elected	R_{32} Re-elected	R_{31} Re-elected	R_{30} Re-elected	R_{29} Re-elected	R_{28}	R_{27}	R_{26}	R_{25}
R_{15}	R_{16}	R_{17}	R_{18}	R_{19}	R_{20}	R_{21}	R_{22}	R_{23}	R_{24}
R_{14}	R_{13}	R_{12}	R_{11}	R_{10}	R_{9}	R_{8}	R_{7}	R_{6}	R_{5}
						R_{1}	R_{2}	R_{3}	R_{4}

=== Beginning of the next Congress ===
						D_{1}	D_{2}	D_{3}	D_{4}
D_{14}	D_{13}	D_{12}	D_{11}	D_{10}	D_{9}	D_{8}	D_{7}	D_{6}	D_{5}
D_{15}	D_{16}	D_{17}	D_{18}	D_{19}	D_{20}	D_{21}	D_{22}	D_{23}	D_{24}
D_{34}	D_{33}	D_{32}	D_{31}	D_{30}	D_{29}	D_{28}	D_{27}	D_{26}	D_{25}
D_{35}	D_{36}	D_{37}	D_{38}	D_{39}	D_{40}	D_{41}	D_{42}	D_{43}	D_{44} Appointed
Majority with vacancies →									D_{44} Appointed
R_{35}	R_{36}	R_{37}	S_{1}	P_{1}	P_{2}	P_{3}	V_{1}	V_{2}	V_{3}
R_{34}	R_{33}	R_{32}	R_{31}	R_{30}	R_{29}	R_{28}	R_{27}	R_{26}	R_{25}
R_{15}	R_{16}	R_{17}	R_{18}	R_{19}	R_{20}	R_{21}	R_{22}	R_{23}	R_{24}
R_{14}	R_{13}	R_{12}	R_{11}	R_{10}	R_{9}	R_{8}	R_{7}	R_{6}	R_{5}
						R_{1}	R_{2}	R_{3}	R_{4}

Key:

D_{#}	Democratic
P_{#}	Populist
R_{#}	Republican
S_{#}	Silver
V_{#}	Vacant

== Race summaries ==
=== Elections during the 52nd Congress ===
In these special elections the winners were seated during the 52nd Congress in 1892 or in 1893 before March 4; ordered by election date.

State	Incumbent			Results	Candidates
State	Senator	Party	Electoral history	Results	Candidates
Maryland (Class 3)	Charles H. Gibson	Democratic	1891 (appointed)	Interim appointee elected January 21, 1892.	▌ ✓ Charles H. Gibson (Democratic) 93; ▌John Walter Smith (Democratic) 21; ▌Elihu E. Jackson (Democratic) 20; ▌William J. Vannort (Republican) 16; ▌John B. Brown (Democratic) 14; ▌James Pearce (Democratic) 14; ▌John S. Wirt (Unknown) 12; ▌George M. Russum (Republican) 2
Texas (Class 1)	Horace Chilton	Democratic	1891 (appointed)	Interim appointee lost election. New senator elected March 22, 1892. Democratic hold.	▌ ✓ Roger Q. Mills (Democratic) 123; ▌J. W. Bailey (Unknown) 3; ▌Horace Chilton (Democratic) 3; ▌Barney Gibbs (Unknown) 2; ▌David B. Culberson (Democratic) 1; ▌G. W. Jones (Independent) 1; ▌Joseph D. Sayers (Democratic) 1
Vermont (Class 1)	Redfield Proctor	Republican	1891 (appointed)	Interim appointee elected October 18, 1892. Winner was also elected to the next term.	▌ ✓ Redfield Proctor (Republican) 124; ▌Edwin J. Phelps (Note: Possibly Edward John Phelps) (Democratic) 35
West Virginia (Class 2)	John E. Kenna	Democratic	1883; 1889	Incumbent died January 11, 1893. New senator elected January 24, 1893. Democratic hold.	▌ ✓ Johnson N. Camden (Democratic) 59; ▌Erwin Maxwell (Republican) 33; ▌M. W. Burgess (Populist) 1
Kentucky (Class 2)	John G. Carlisle	Democratic	1890 (special)	Incumbent resigned February 4, 1893. New senator elected February 15, 1893. Democratic hold.	▌ ✓ William Lindsay (Democratic) 79 votes; ▌Augustus E. Willson (Republican) 17 votes

In this special election, the winner was seated in the 53rd Congress, starting March 4, 1893.

State	Incumbent			Results	Candidates
State	Senator	Party	Electoral history	Results	Candidates
Kansas (Class 2)	Bishop W. Perkins	Republican	1892 (appointed)	Interim appointee retired. New senator elected on January 25, 1893, but did not qualify until the next Congress on March 4, 1893. Democratic gain. Immediately thereafter, another joint convention elected J. W. Ady, but that contest of Martin's election was "soon abandoned."	▌ ✓ John Martin (Democratic) 86; ▌M. W. Cobun (Unknown) 4; ▌W. S. Harona (Unknown) 1; ▌S. H. Snyder (Unknown) 1; ▌Fred J. Close (Unknown) 1

In this early regular election, the winner was seated in the 54th Congress, starting March 4, 1895.

State	Incumbent			Results	Candidates
State	Senator	Party	Electoral history	Results	Candidates
Mississippi	Edward C. Walthall	Democratic	1885 (appointed); 1886 (special); 1889	Incumbent re-elected early on January 19, 1892, for the term beginning 1895. Walthall, however, had already been re-elected to next term.	▌ ✓ Edward C. Walthall (Democratic) 135; ▌Clarke Lewis (Democratic) 21; ▌Charles E. Hooker (Democratic) 4

=== Races leading to the 53rd Congress ===
In these regular elections, the winners were elected for the term beginning March 4, 1893; ordered by state.

All of the elections involved the Class 1 seats.

State	Incumbent			Results	Candidates
State	Senator	Party	Electoral history	Results	Candidates
California	Charles N. Felton	Republican	1891 (special)	Incumbent retired. New senator elected January 18, 1893. Democratic gain.	▌ ✓ Stephen M. White (Democratic) [?]; ▌Charles N. Felton (Republican) 11; ▌[FNU] Perkins (Republican) 12; ▌Thomas H. Bard (Unknown) 9; ▌[FNU] Cator (Note: Full name unavailable) (Populist) 7
Connecticut	Joseph R. Hawley	Republican	1881; 1887	Incumbent re-elected January 18, 1893.	▌ ✓ Joseph R. Hawley (Republican) 138; ▌Carlos French (Democratic) 114; ▌S. B. Forbes (Prohibition) 1
Delaware	George Gray	Democratic	1885 (special); 1887	Incumbent re-elected January 17, 1893.	▌ ✓ George Gray (Democratic) 28; Unopposed
Florida	Samuel Pasco	Democratic	1887	Legislature failed to elect. Democratic loss. Incumbent was later appointed, then elected; see below.	[data missing]
Indiana	David Turpie	Democratic	1863 (special); 1863 (retired); 1887	Incumbent re-elected January 18, 1893.	▌ ✓ David Turpie (Democratic) 98; ▌Charles W. Fairbanks (Republican) 50
Maine	Eugene Hale	Republican	1881; 1887	Incumbent re-elected.	First ballot (January 17, 1893): ▌ ✓ Eugene Hale (Republican) 95 H; 28 S; ▌Arthur Sewall (Democratic) 41 H; 1 S; ▌Absent 15 H; 2 S
Maryland	Arthur P. Gorman	Democratic	1880; 1886	Incumbent re-elected January 19, 1892.	▌ ✓ Arthur P. Gorman (Democratic) 100; ▌Lloyd Lowndes (Republican) 9
Massachusetts	Henry L. Dawes	Republican	1875; 1881; 1887	Incumbent retired. New senator elected January 17, 1893. Republican hold.	▌ ✓ Henry Cabot Lodge (Republican) 190; ▌Patrick A. Collins (Democratic) 82
Michigan	Francis B. Stockbridge	Republican	1887	Incumbent re-elected January 17, 1893.	▌ ✓ Francis B. Stockbridge (Republican) 86; ▌Daniel J. Campau (Democratic) 37; ▌Eugene H. Belden (Populist) 5
Minnesota	Cushman Davis	Republican	1886	Incumbent re-elected January 18, 1893, on the second ballot.	▌ ✓ Cushman Davis (Republican) 86; ▌Daniel W. Lawler (Democratic) 48; ▌Sidney M. Owen (Populist) 23
Mississippi	James Z. George	Democratic	1880; 1886	Incumbent re-elected January 19, 1892.	▌ ✓ James Z. George (Democratic) 101; ▌Ethelbert Barksdale (Democratic) 53; ▌James L. Alcorn (Republican) 1
Missouri	Francis Cockrell	Democratic	1874; 1881; 1887	Incumbent re-elected January 18, 1893.	▌ ✓ Francis Cockrell (Democratic) 129; ▌Chauncey I. Filley (Republican) 49
Montana	Wilbur F. Sanders	Republican	1890	Legislature failed to elect. Republican loss.	▌William A. Clark (Democratic); ▌Wilbur F. Sanders (Republican) [data missing]
Nebraska	Algernon Paddock	Republican	1875; 1880 (lost); 1886	Incumbent retired. New senator elected February 7, 1893, on the seventh ballot. Populist gain.	▌ ✓ William V. Allen (Populist) 70; ▌Algernon Paddock (Republican) 59
Nevada	William M. Stewart	Republican	1887	Incumbent re-elected as a Silver January 24, 1893. Silver gain.	▌ ✓ William M. Stewart (Silver); [data missing]
New Jersey	Rufus Blodgett	Democratic	1886	Incumbent retired. New senator elected January 24, 1893. Democratic hold.	▌ ✓ James Smith Jr. (Democratic) 55; ▌William J. Sewell (Republican) 26
New York	Frank Hiscock	Republican	1887	Incumbent lost re-election. New senator elected January 17, 1893. Democratic gain.	▌ ✓ Edward Murphy Jr. (Democratic) 90; ▌Frank Hiscock (Republican) 74; ▌Whitelaw Reid (Republican) 1
North Dakota	Lyman R. Casey	Republican	1889	Incumbent lost re-election. New senator elected February 20, 1893, on the sixty-first ballot. Democratic gain.	▌ ✓ William N. Roach (Democratic) 50; ▌Lyman R. Casey (Republican) 23; ▌John D. Benton (Democratic) eliminated; ▌Walter Muir (Independent) eliminated
Ohio	John Sherman	Republican	1861 (special); 1866; 1872; 1877 (resigned); 1881; 1886	Incumbent re-elected January 12, 1892.	▌ ✓ John Sherman (Republican) 111; ▌James E. Neal (Democratic) 37
Pennsylvania	Matthew Quay	Republican	1887	Incumbent re-elected January 17, 1893.	▌ ✓ Matthew Quay (Republican) 64.96%; ▌George Ross (Democratic) 31.50%; Others; see below.
Rhode Island	Nelson W. Aldrich	Republican	1881 (special); 1886	Incumbent re-elected June 14, 1892.	▌ ✓ Nelson W. Aldrich (Republican) 64; ▌David S. Baker Jr. (Unknown) 38
Tennessee	Washington C. Whitthorne	Democratic	1887	Incumbent retired or lost renomination. New senator elected January 17, 1893. Democratic hold.	▌ ✓ William B. Bate (Democratic) 89; ▌George W. Winstead (Republican) 31; ▌A. E. Garret (Populist) 6
Texas	Roger Q. Mills	Democratic	1892 (special)	Incumbent re-elected January 24, 1893.	▌ ✓ Roger Q. Mills (Democratic) 143; ▌Thomas L. Nugent (Populist) 9; ▌N. W. Cuney (Republican) 1
Vermont	Redfield Proctor	Republican	1891 (appointed)	Interim appointee elected October 18, 1892. Winner was also elected to finish the current term; see above.	▌ ✓ Redfield Proctor (Republican) 124; ▌Edwin J. Phelps (Democratic) 35
Virginia	John W. Daniel	Democratic	1887	Incumbent had already been re-elected early December 16, 1891.	
Washington	John B. Allen	Republican	1889	Legislature failed to elect after 101 ballots on March 9, 1893. Republican loss.	▌John B. Allen (Republican); ▌[FNU] Turner (Republican); ▌[FNU] Griggs (Democratic); ▌[FNU] Teats (Populist)
West Virginia	Charles J. Faulkner	Democratic	1887	Incumbent re-elected January 24, 1893.	▌ ✓ Charles J. Faulkner (Democratic) 59 votes; ▌Stephen B. Elkins (Republican) 32 votes; ▌O. D. Hill (Populist) 2 votes
Wisconsin	Philetus Sawyer	Republican	1887	Incumbent retired. New senator elected January 27, 1893. Democratic gain.	▌ ✓ John L. Mitchell (Democratic) 62.10%; ▌John C. Spooner (Republican) 37.10%; ▌Edward S. Bragg (Democratic) 0.80%
Wyoming	Francis E. Warren	Republican	1890	Legislature failed to elect. Republican loss.	▌Francis E. Warren (Republican); ▌Clarence D. Clark (Republican)

=== Elections during the 53rd Congress ===
In these elections, the winners were elected in 1893 after March 4, and seated in the 53rd Congress.

State	Incumbent			Results	Candidates
State	Senator	Party	Electoral history	Results	Candidates
Florida (Class 1)	Samuel Pasco	Democratic	1887; 1893 (failed to elect); 1893 (appointed)	Interim appointee elected April 20, 1893.	▌ ✓ Samuel Pasco (Democratic); [data missing]
Virginia (Class 2)	Eppa Hunton	Democratic	1892 (appointed)	Interim appointee elected December 19, 1893.	▌ ✓ Eppa Hunton (Democratic); [data missing]

In this election, the winner was seated in the 54th Congress, starting March 4, 1895.

State	Incumbent			Results	Candidates
State	Senator	Party	Electoral history	Results	Candidates
Virginia (Class 2)	Eppa Hunton	Democratic	1892 (appointed)	Interim appointee retired. New senator elected early December 19, 1893, for the term beginning in 1895. Democratic hold.	▌ ✓ Thomas S. Martin (Democratic); [data missing]

== Maryland ==
=== Maryland (regular) ===
1892 United States Senate election in Maryland
- January 19, 1892

80 members of the Maryland General Assembly
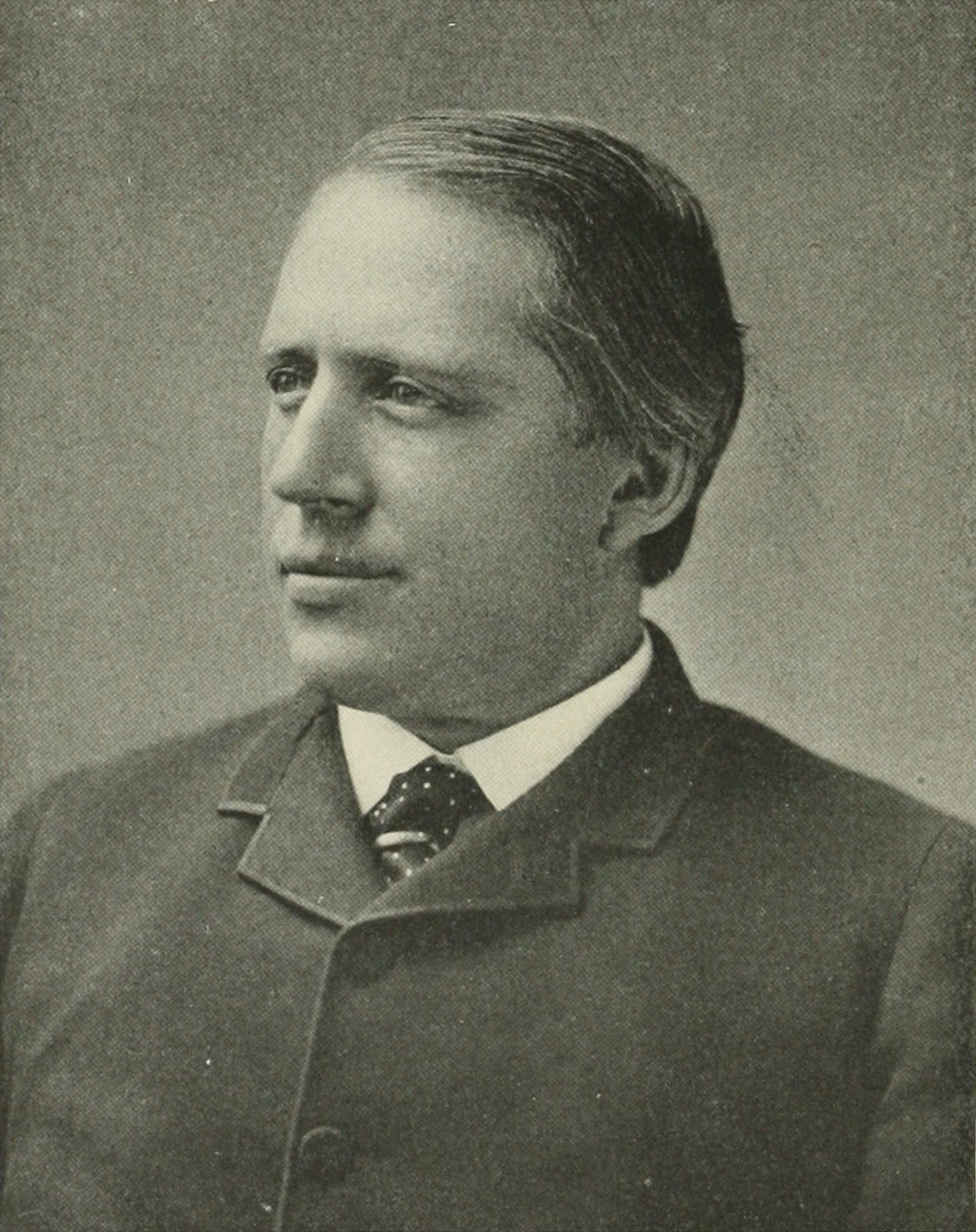

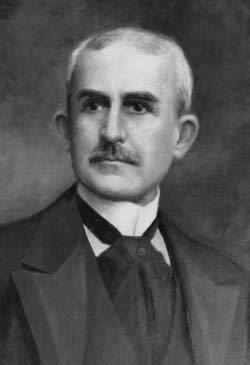
Candidate	Arthur Pue Gorman	Lloyd Lowndes Jr.
Party	Democratic	Republican
Legislative vote	80	6
Percentage	93.02%	6.98

Arthur Pue Gorman won re-election against Lloyd Lowndes Jr. by a margin of 86.05%, or 74 votes, for the Class 1 seat.

=== Maryland (special) ===
1892 United States Senate special election in Maryland
- January 1892

80 members of the Maryland General Assembly
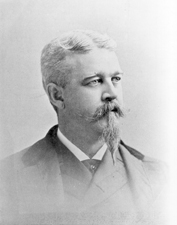
Candidate	Charles Hopper Gibson	William J. Vannort
Party	Democratic	Republican
Legislative vote	86	8
Percentage	76.11%	7.08%

Charles Hopper Gibson was elected to fill the seat vacated by Ephraim King Wilson II by a margin of 69.03%, or 78 votes, for the Class 3 seat.

== Mississippi ==
=== Mississippi (regular, class 2) ===
Early election for the term beginning in 1895.

== New York ==
The New York election was held on January 18, 1893, by the New York State Legislature.

Incumbent Senator Frank Hiscock was elected to this seat in 1887, with his term to expire on March 3, 1893.

At the controversial State election in November 1891, 17 Democrats, 14 Republicans and 1 Independent were elected for a two-year term (1892-1893) in the State Senate. This was the only time a Democratic majority was seated in the State Senate between 1874 and 1910. At the State election in November 1892, 74 Democrats and 54 Republicans were elected for the session of 1893 to the Assembly. The 116th New York State Legislature met from January 3 to April 20, 1893, at Albany, New York.

The Democratic caucus met on January 10. 90 State legislators attended, only Assemblyman John Cooney, of Brooklyn, was absent due to illness. State Senator Amasa J. Parker Jr. presided. Edward Murphy Jr., a wealthy brewer of Troy, and Chairman of the Democratic State Committee, was nominated by a large majority. The New York Times had suggested earlier to nominate Carl Schurz, a former Republican U.S. Senator from Missouri and U.S. Secretary of the Interior, who lived now in New York City, but the political machines of upstate boss David B. Hill and Tammany Hall chose a loyal party machine man rather than an Ex-Republican advocate of civil service reform. Even President-elect Grover Cleveland had voiced his disapproval of Murphy, to no avail.

1893 Democratic caucus
Candidate	First ballot
✓ Edward Murphy Jr.	85
W. Bourke Cockran	5

The Republican caucus met on January 11. State Senator Thomas Hunter presided. They re-nominated the incumbent U.S. Senator Frank Hiscock by acclamation.

Edward Murphy, Jr., was the choice of both the Assembly and the State Senate, and was declared elected. State Senator James T. Edwards (32nd D.), of Randolph, voted for the defeated Republican vice presidential candidate of 1892, Whitelaw Reid.

1893 United States Senator election
House	Democratic		Republican		Republican	
State Senate (32 members)	✓ Edward Murphy Jr.	17	Frank Hiscock	12	Whitelaw Reid	1
State Assembly (128 members)	✓ Edward Murphy Jr.	73	Frank Hiscock	52		

Note: The votes were cast on January 17, but both Houses met in a joint session on January 18 to compare nominations, and declare the result.

When Murphy took his seat, for the first time since 1849 New York was represented by two Democrats in the U.S. Senate. Murphy served a single term, remaining in the U.S. Senate until March 3, 1899. In January 1899, Murphy was defeated for re-election by Republican Chauncey M. Depew.

== Pennsylvania ==
The election in Pennsylvania was held January 17, 1893. Incumbent Matthew Quay was re-elected by the Pennsylvania General Assembly.

State Legislature Results
Party	Candidate	Votes	%
Republican	Matthew Quay (Incumbent)	165	64.96
Democratic	George Ross	80	31.50
Republican	John Dalzell	1	0.39
Democratic	William F. Harrity	1	0.39
Democratic	William Mutchler	1	0.39
N/A	Not voting	6	2.36
Totals		254	100.00%

== Virginia ==
=== Virginia (regular, class 1) ===
Incumbent Senator John W. Daniel (who had been first elected in 1887) was re-elected in 1893.

=== Virginia (special, class 2) ===
Democratic incumbent John S. Barbour Jr. died May 14, 1892. Democrat Eppa Hunton was appointed May 28, 1892, to continue until a special election.

Hunton was elected December 20, 1893, to finish the term (ending March 1895).

== Wisconsin ==
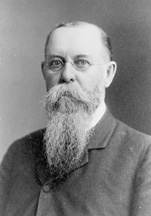
Senator John L. Mitchell

Two-term Republican Philetus Sawyer retired and two-term Democratic congressman John L. Mitchell was elected to the next term. In the Wisconsin Legislature, Democrats had a majority, but it took 31 ballots for Democrats to pick Mitchell over fellow Democrats John H. Knight and Edward S. Bragg.

Vote of the Wisconsin Legislature, January 27, 1893
Party	Candidate	Votes	%
Democratic	John L. Mitchell	77	58.33
Republican	John Coit Spooner	46	34.85
Democratic	Edward S. Bragg	1	0.76
N/A	No vote	8	6.06
Plurality		31	23.48
Total votes		132	100.0
Democratic gain from Republican			

== See also ==
- 1892 United States elections
  - 1892 United States presidential election
  - 1892 United States House of Representatives elections
- 52nd United States Congress
- 53rd United States Congress

== Sources ==
- "Party Division in the Senate, 1789-Present". via Senate.gov.
- Byrd, Robert C. (October 1, 1993). Wolff, Wendy (ed.). The Senate, 1789-1989: Historical Statistics, 1789-1992. United States Senate Historical Office (volume 4 Bicentennial ed.). Washington, D.C.: U.S. Government Printing Office. ISBN 9780160632563.
- Cox, Harold (January 31, 2007). "Pennsylvania Election Statistics: 1682-2006". The Wilkes University Election Statistics Project. Wilkes University.
- Rhoades, Henry Eckford; McPherson, Edward; Schem, A. J.; Ottarson, F. J.; Cleveland, John F.; Greeley, Horace (1893). "Election of United States Senators, 1892". The Tribune Almanac for 1893. New York: The Tribune Association. pp. 68–69 – via HathiTrust Digital Library.
- Rhoades, Henry Eckford; McPherson, Edward; Schem, A. J.; Ottarson, F. J.; Cleveland, John F.; Greeley, Horace (1894). "Election of United States Senators, 1893". The Tribune Almanac for 1894. New York: The Tribune Association. pp. 87–91 – via HathiTrust Digital Library.
- "STATESMEN OUT OF FASHION.; BREWER MURPHY OF TROY NOMINATED FOR SENATOR" (PDF). The New York Times. January 11, 1893.
- "SENATOR HISCOCK'S "EMPTY HONOR"" (PDF). The New York Times. January 12, 1893.
- "EDWARD MURPHY ELECTED" (PDF). The New York Times. January 18, 1893.
