= 1899 United States Senate election in New York =

- January 17, 1899

Majority vote of each house needed to win
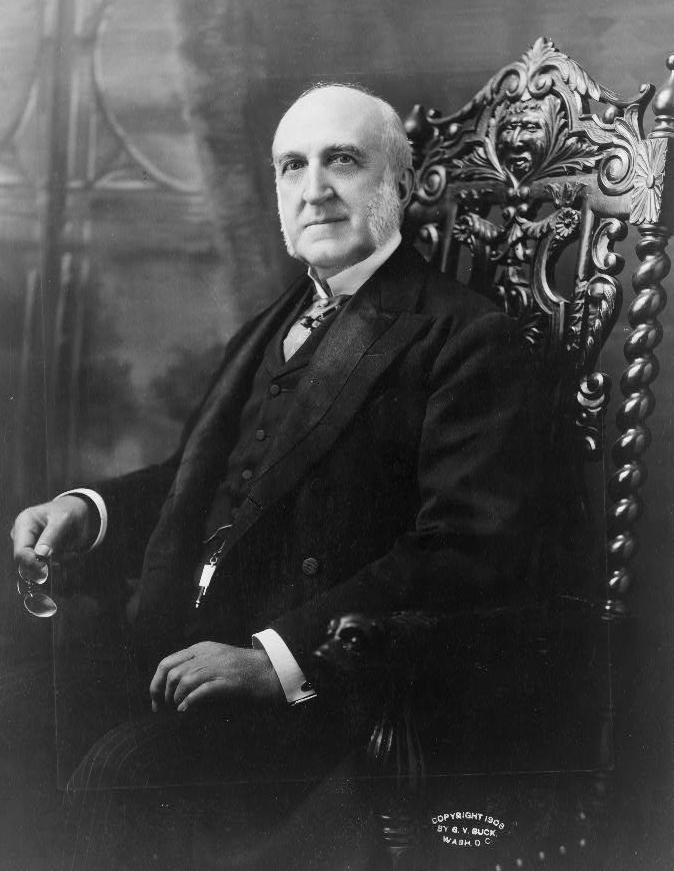

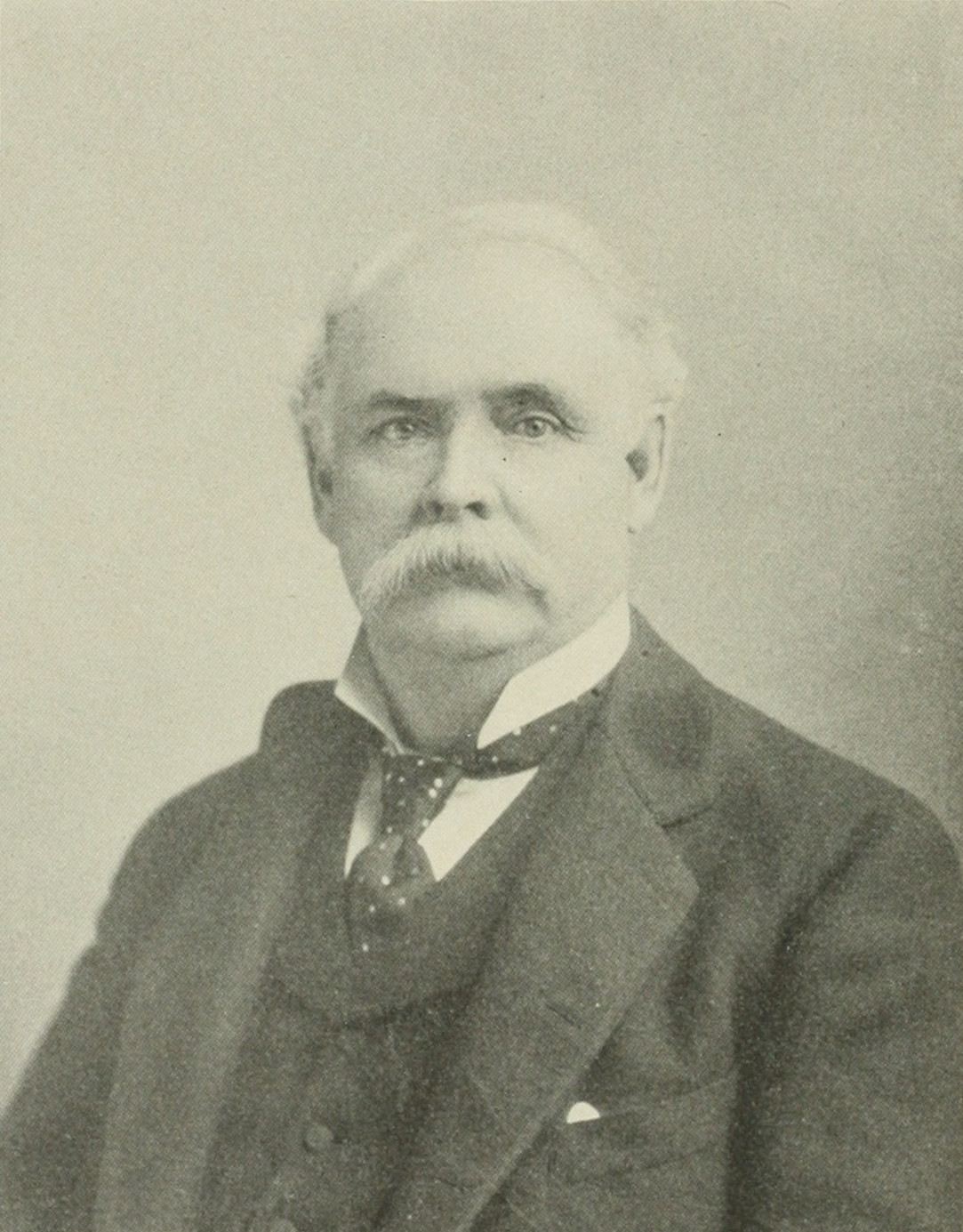
Nominee	Chauncey Depew	Edward Murphy Jr.
Party	Republican	Democratic
Senate	27	23
Percentage	54.00%	46.00%
House	84	60
Percentage	58.33%	41.67%
Senator before election
Edward Murphy Jr.
Democratic
Elected Senator
Chauncey Depew
Republican

The 1899 United States Senate election in New York was held on January 17, 1899. Incumbent Democratic Senator Edward Murphy Jr. stood for re-election to a second term but was defeated by Republican Chauncey Depew. Republicans had maintained control of both houses of the legislature in the 1898 New York state election.

== Background ==
Democrat Edward Murphy Jr. had been elected to this seat in 1893, and his term would expire on March 3, 1899.

At the State election in November 1898, 27 Republicans and 23 Democrats were elected for a two-year term (1899–1900) in the State Senate; and 88 Republicans and 62 Democrats were elected for the session of 1899 to the Assembly. The 122nd New York State Legislature met from January 4 to April 28, 1899, at Albany, New York.

== Candidates ==
=== Republican caucus ===
The Republican caucus met on January 12. State Senator Hobart Krum presided. They nominated Chauncey M. Depew unanimously. Depew had been Secretary of State of New York from 1864 to 1865, and was the frontrunning candidate to succeed Thomas C. Platt at the U.S. Senate special election in 1881 when he withdrew after the 41st ballot. Parallel to his political career, he moved up the ladder in the Vanderbilt Railroad System, being President of the New York Central and Hudson River Railroad from 1885 to 1898, and holding positions in dozens of other railroad companies.

=== Democratic caucus ===
The Democratic caucus met also on January 12. State Senator George W. Plunkitt presided. They re-nominated the incumbent U.S. Senator Edward Murphy Jr. unanimously.

== Result ==
Chauncey M. Depew was the choice of both the Assembly and the State Senate, and was declared elected.

1899 United States Senator election result
House	Republican		Democratic	
State Senate (50 members)	Chauncey M. Depew	27	Edward Murphy Jr.	23
State Assembly (150 members)	Chauncey M. Depew	84	Edward Murphy Jr.	60

Note: The votes were cast on January 17, but both Houses met in a joint session on January 18 to compare nominations, and declare the result.

== Aftermath ==
Depew was re-elected in 1905, and served two terms, most of the time alongside his adversary of 1881, Thomas C. Platt. Depew remained in the U.S. Senate until March 3, 1911. In 1911, Depew was defeated for re-election by Democrat James A. O'Gorman after a deadlock of two months and a half.

== See also ==
- United States Senate elections, 1898 and 1899

== Sources ==
- Members of the 56th United States Congress
- MR. DEPEW FOR SENATOR in NYT on January 13, 1899
- Senator Murphy Renominated in NYT on January 13, 1899
- ELECTION OF MR. DEPEW in NYT on January 18, 1899
