= Thomas W. Moloney =

American politician (1862–1917)

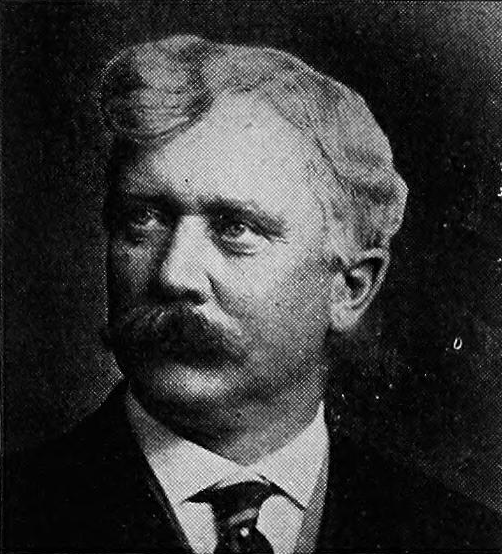
- Moloney in 1917 publication

Member of the Vermont House of Representatives
- In office 1890–1891

Personal details
- Born: January 10, 1862 West Rutland, Vermont, U.S.
- Died: June 30, 1917 (aged 55) Rutland, Vermont, U.S.
- Resting place: Calvary Cemetery; Rutland, Vermont, U.S.
- Party: Democratic
- Spouse: Annie G. Gooley (m. 1891)
- Children: 9
- Education: Collège de Montréal; College of the Holy Cross (BA)
- Occupation: Politician; lawyer

Thomas W. Moloney (January 10, 1862 – June 30, 1917) was an American politician and lawyer from Vermont. He served as a member of the Vermont House of Representatives, representing Rutland from 1890 to 1891. He was the Democratic nominee for Governor of Vermont in 1898.

== Early life ==
Thomas W. Moloney was born on January 10, 1862, in West Rutland, Vermont, to Mary Ryan and Michael Moloney. He was educated in public schools in West Rutland. He also studied at Collège de Montréal in Montreal and graduated from the College of the Holy Cross in 1882. He was a law student in the 1880s in the law office of Redington & Butler in Rutland. He was admitted to the bar in 1885.

== Career ==
Moloney practiced law in Rutland starting in 1885. He formed a law practice with Fred M. Butler called Butler & Moloney. After Butler retired on February 1, 1909, Moloney practiced law alone.

Moloney represented Rutland in the Vermont House of Representatives from 1890 to 1891. He was the Democratic nominee for governor in the 1898 Vermont gubernatorial election. He was the Democratic nominee for the U.S. Senate in 1902. He served as chairman of Vermont's delegation at the 1896 and 1900 Democratic National Conventions.

Moloney wrote a history of Vermont for the Catholic encyclopaedia.

== Personal life ==
Moloney married Annie G. Gooley on November 23, 1891. They had nine children, including John J., Charlotte F., Mary, Thomas, Annie, Philip, Margaret and Joseph. Moloney was a Catholic and was a member of the Knights of Columbus. He was the first grand knight of the organization in Rutland. He was also a member of St. Peter's Church.

Moloney died on June 30, 1917, at his home in Rutland. He was buried at Calvary Cemetery in Rutland.
