= 1887 United States Senate election in Wisconsin =

- January 26, 1887
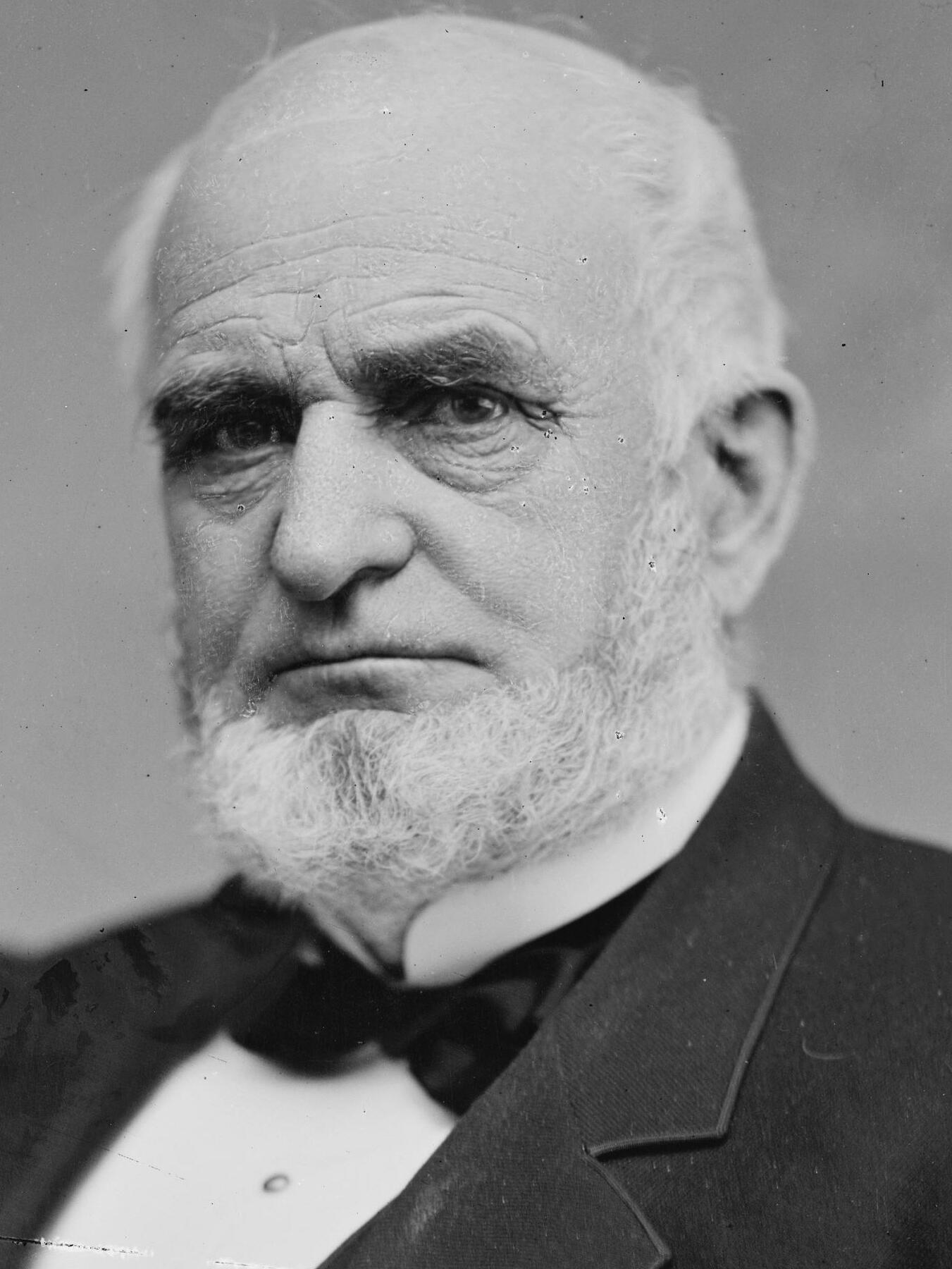

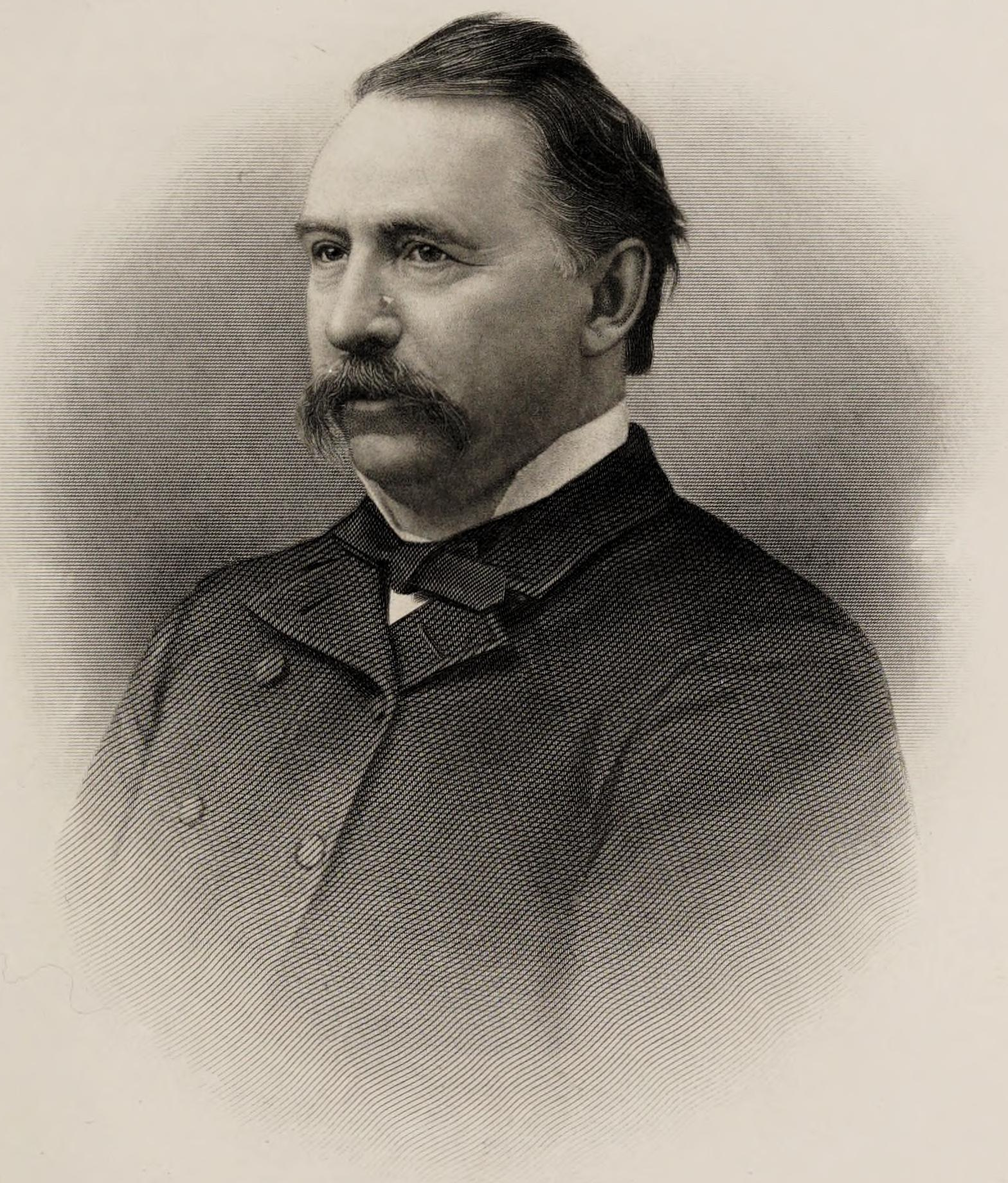
Nominee	Philetus Sawyer	John Winans	John Cochrane
Party	Republican	Democratic	Labor
Legislative vote	82	37	6
Percentage	65.60%	29.60%	4.80%
U.S. senator before election
Philetus Sawyer
Republican
Elected U.S. Senator
Philetus Sawyer
Republican

The 1887 United States Senate election in Wisconsin was held in the 38th Wisconsin Legislature on January 26, 1887. Incumbent Republican U.S. senator Philetus Sawyer was re-elected on the first ballot.

At the start of the 1887 term, Republicans held substantial majorities in both chambers of the Wisconsin Legislature, so had more than enough votes to elect a Republican United States senator.

== Major candidates ==
=== Democratic ===
- John Winans, former U.S. representative of Wisconsin's 1st congressional district, incumbent state representative and incumbent mayor of Janesville, Wisconsin.

=== Republican ===
- Philetus Sawyer, incumbent U.S. senator, former U.S representative, and former mayor of Oshkosh, Wisconsin.

=== Labor ===
- John M. Cochrane, founder and former master of the Wisconsin Grange.

== Results ==
1st Vote of the 38th Wisconsin Legislature, January 26, 1887
Party	Candidate	Votes	%
Republican	Philetus Sawyer (incumbent)	82 (Note: Sawyer received the votes of all Republican members except for representatives James L. Murphy and Andrew J. Stewart (who were absent); he also received one cross-over vote from independent democratic representative John F. Huebner.)	65.60%
Democratic	John Winans	37 (Note: Winans received the votes of all Democratic members except for representatives Patrick Finnerty, Reinhardt Rahr, Andrew Schmidlkofer, and George E. Tate (who were absent); Winans abstained from the voting himself; he also received the votes of independent representatives Richard Dewhurst, James B. McLeran, and John Williams Tobey.)	29.60%
Labor	John Cochrane	6 (Note: Sawyer received the votes of all Labor members and received the vote of independent representative Benjamin Charles Garside.)	4.80%
	Absent or not voting	8	
Majority		63	50.40%
Total votes		125	93.98%
Republican hold			
