= 1893 United States Senate election in New York =

- January 17 and 18, 1893

Majority vote of each house needed to win
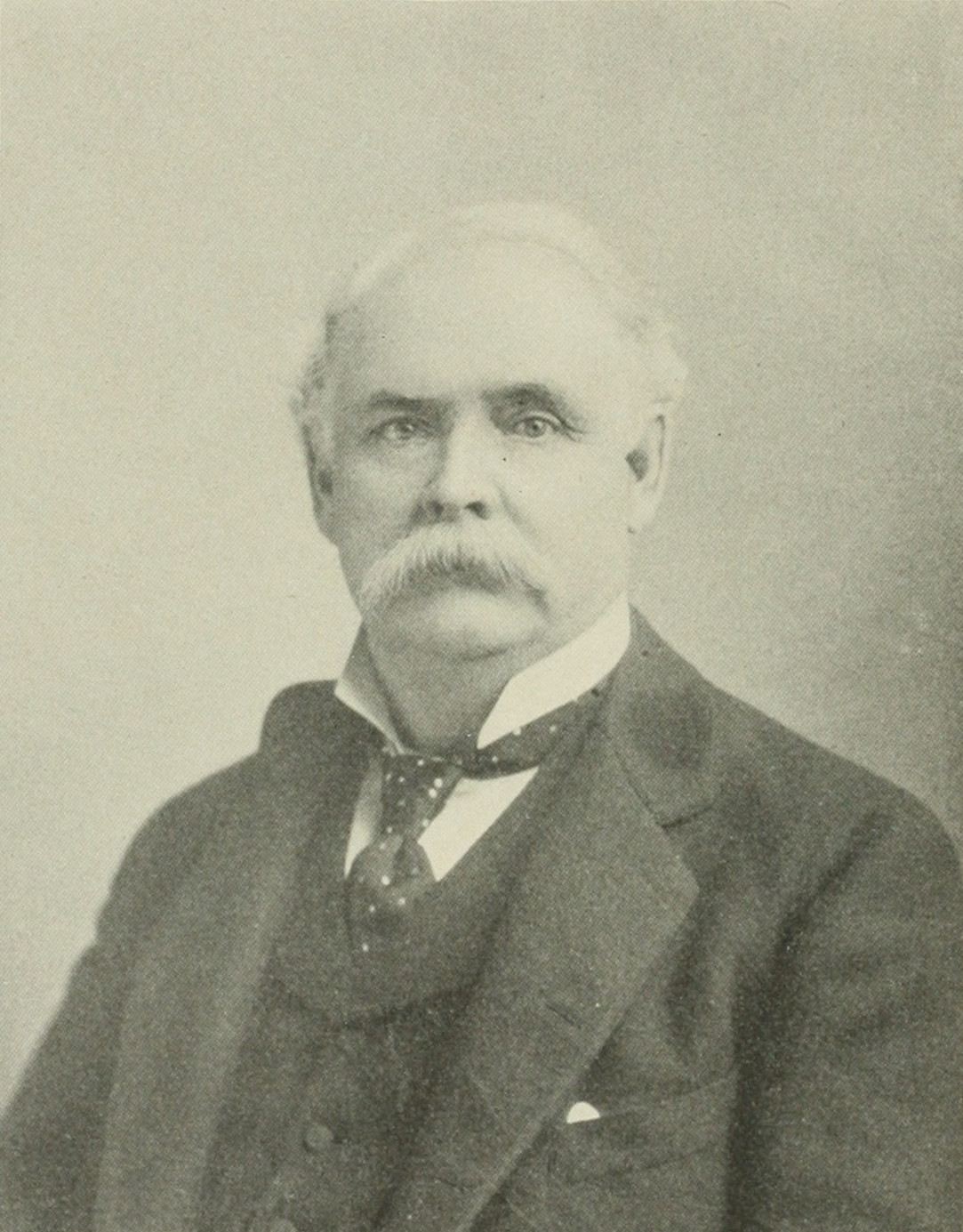

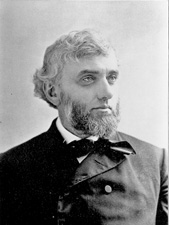
| Nominee | Edward Murphy Jr. | Frank Hiscock |
| Party | Democratic | Republican |
| Senate | 17 | 12 |
| Percentage | 56.7% | 4.0% |
| Assembly | 73 | 52 |
| Percentage | 58.4% | 41.6% |
Senator before election
Frank Hiscock
Republican
Elected Senator
Edward Murphy Jr.
Democratic

The 1893 United States Senate election in New York was held on January 17, 1893, by the New York State Legislature to elect a U.S. senator (Class 1) to represent the State of New York in the United States Senate.

== Background ==
Republican Frank Hiscock had been elected to this seat in 1887, and his term would expire on March 3, 1893.

At the controversial State election in November 1891, 17 Democrats, 14 Republicans and 1 Independent were elected for a two-year term (1892–1893) in the State Senate. This was the only time a Democratic majority was seated in the State Senate between 1874 and 1910. At the State election in November 1892, 74 Democrats and 54 Republicans were elected for the session of 1893 to the Assembly. The 116th New York State Legislature met from January 3 to April 20, 1893, at Albany, New York.

== Candidates ==
=== Democratic caucus ===
The Democratic caucus met on January 10. 90 State legislators attended, only Assemblyman John Cooney, of Brooklyn, was absent due to illness. State Senator Amasa J. Parker Jr. presided. Edward Murphy Jr., a wealthy brewer of Troy, and Chairman of the Democratic State Committee, was nominated by a large majority. The New York Times had suggested earlier to nominate Carl Schurz, a former Republican U.S. Senator from Missouri and U.S. Secretary of the Interior, who lived now in New York City, but the political machines of upstate boss David B. Hill and Tammany Hall chose a loyal party machine man rather than an ex-Republican advocate of civil service reform. Even President-elect Grover Cleveland had voiced his disapproval of Murphy, to no avail.

1893 Democratic caucus for United States Senator
| Party | Candidate | Votes | % |
|---|---|---|---|
| Democratic | Edward Murphy Jr. | 85 | 94.44% |
| Democratic | W. Bourke Cockran | 5 | 5.56% |
| Total votes | | 90 | 100.00% |

=== Republican caucus ===
The Republican caucus met on January 11. State Senator Thomas Hunter presided. They re-nominated the incumbent U.S. Senator Frank Hiscock by acclamation.

== Result ==
Edward Murphy Jr. was the choice of both the Assembly and the State Senate, and was declared elected. State Senator James T. Edwards (32nd D.), of Randolph, voted for the defeated Republican vice presidential candidate of 1892, Whitelaw Reid.

1893 United States Senator election result
| Office | House | Democrat | | Republican | | Republican | |
|---|---|---|---|---|---|---|---|
| U.S. Senator (Class 1) | State Senate (32 members) | Edward Murphy Jr. | 17 | Frank Hiscock | 12 | Whitelaw Reid | 1 |
| | State Assembly (128 members) | Edward Murphy Jr. | 73 | Frank Hiscock | 52 | | |

Note: The votes were cast on January 17, but both Houses met in a joint session on January 18 to compare nominations, and declare the result.

== Aftermath ==
When Murphy took his seat, New York was represented by two Democrats in the U.S. Senate for the first time since 1849. Murphy served a single term, remaining in the U.S. Senate until March 3, 1899. In January 1899, Murphy was defeated for re-election by Republican Chauncey M. Depew.

== See also ==
- United States Senate elections, 1892 and 1893

== Sources ==
- Members of the 53rd United States Congress
- "STATESMEN OUT OF FASHION.; BREWER MURPHY OF TROY NOMINATED FOR SENATOR" (PDF). The New York Times. January 11, 1893.
- "SENATOR HISCOCK'S "EMPTY HONOR"" (PDF). The New York Times. January 12, 1893.
- "EDWARD MURPHY ELECTED" (PDF). The New York Times. January 18, 1893.
