= 1893 United States Senate election in Wisconsin =

- January 27, 1893
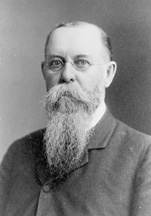

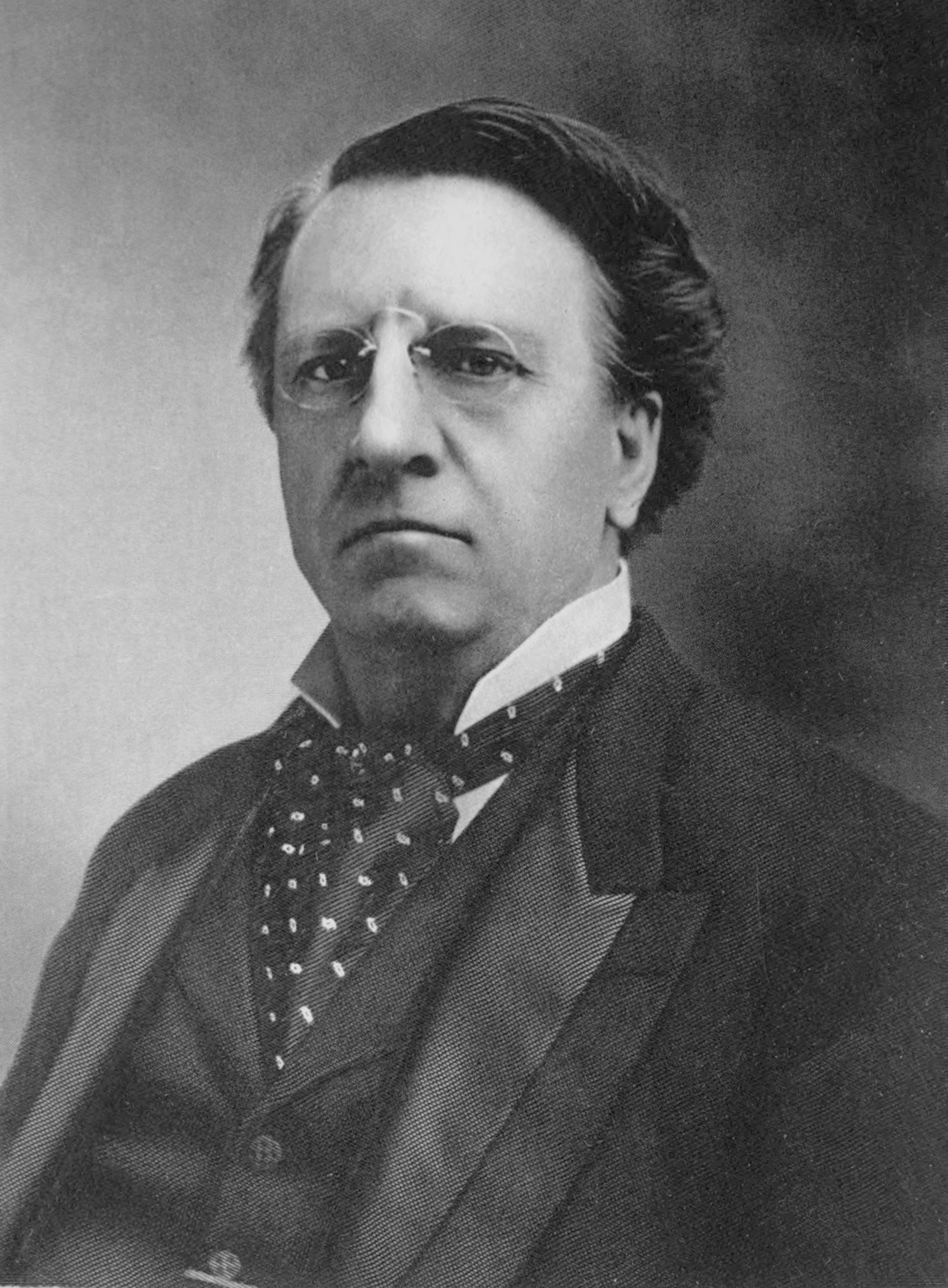

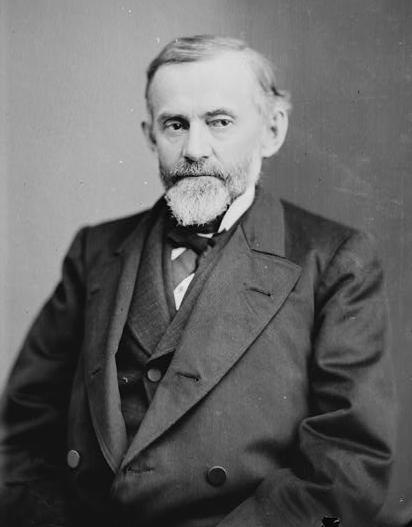
Nominee	John L. Mitchell	John C. Spooner	Edward S. Bragg
Party	Democratic	Republican	Democratic
Legislative vote	77	46	1
Percentage	62.10%	37.10%	0.80%
U.S. senator before election
Philetus Sawyer
Republican
Elected U.S. Senator
John L. Mitchell
Democratic

The 1893 United States Senate election in Wisconsin was held in the 41st Wisconsin Legislature on January 27, 1893. Incumbent Republican U.S. senator Philetus Sawyer did not run for re-election. Incumbent U.S. representative John L. Mitchell was elected United States senator on the first ballot.

In the 1893 term, Democrats held significant majorities in both chambers of the Wisconsin Legislature, so had more than enough votes to elect a Democratic United States senator. The main contest occurred in the Democratic caucus, where incumbent U.S. representative John L. Mitchell outmaneuvered former U.S. representative Edward S. Bragg and secured the nomination on the 31st ballot.

== Major candidates ==
=== Democratic ===
- Edward S. Bragg, former U.S. representative, former U.S. ambassador, former Union Army general.
- John H. Knight, former chairman of the Democratic Party of Wisconsin, former mayor of Ashland, Wisconsin.
- John L. Mitchell, incumbent U.S. representative of Wisconsin's 4th congressional district, one of the richest men in Wisconsin at the time.

=== Republican ===
- John Coit Spooner, former U.S. senator.

== Results ==
=== Democratic nomination ===
Before the 1892 legislative election was even done, it was well known in the state political press which three men were seeking the Democratic nomination for U.S. Senate. Bragg had been a candidate for U.S. Senate before, and was rumored to have made a deal with William F. Vilas to divide the 1891 and 1893 U.S. Senate elections. Whether a deal actually existed is not known, but Vilas did not support Bragg in 1893, instead supporting the recent chair of the state Democratic Party, John H. Knight. But looming large in the race was Milwaukee businessman and philanthropist John L. Mitchell. Since inheriting his father's business empire in 1887, Mitchell had poured money into the state Democratic Party, particularly in Milwaukee County. Although less experienced in politics, Mitchell's campaign was managed by two of the top lobbyists in the state.

The Democratic caucus initially met on Wednesday, January 18. An informal vote was taken, followed by three formal ballots, with relatively static results, showing Mitchell and Bragg both about 10 votes away from the nomination, with Knight about 10 votes behind them. The caucus reconvened the next afternoon, four more ballots were taken with almost no change. They adjourned until later that evening, four more votes were taken with very little change. At the end of the second day, Mitchell stood at 33, Bragg at 28, Knight at 18. The Bragg and Knight delegations then agreed to adjourn for the weekend, hoping that pressure on the legislators over the weekend from their constituents would weaken Mitchell's support.

Over the weekend, campaigning turned much more negative. A report was published accusing Knight and Vilas of corruption in the sale of vast northern Wisconsin pine lands. Mitchell's allies accused Bragg of leaking the Knight documents, but Bragg's supporters accused Mitchell of orchestrating the whole affair. The actual source was apparently neither camp, but Republican opponents of Knight's from northern Wisconsin. The caucus re-convened on Monday, January 23, and took five more votes, still finding very little change; Mitchell at 30, Bragg at 29, Knight at 19.

Six more votes were taken on the morning of January 24, with little change. The 23rd ballot was taken later that night, no change. The next day, five more ballots were taken finding Mitchell and Bragg tied at 29, with Knight at 20. On the morning of January 26, news leaked that Knight would withdraw from the race. Initially, Bragg's supporters were optimistic, since they believed Knight's supporters were more akin to their own, but over the course of the afternoon it emerged that a deal had been struck between Knight and Mitchell, and Knight worked to deliver his supporters. That afternoon, the caucus voted for the 31st time, Mitchell received 46 of 79 votes and won the nomination.

=== Official vote ===
The 41st Wisconsin Legislature met in joint session on January 27, 1893. Voting went almost exactly along party lines, with seven members absent and two vacant seats due to deaths. Democratic representative Daniel A. Mahoney was initially marked absent, but was later found to have died in his hotel room on the morning of the joint session.

1st Vote of the 41st Wisconsin Legislature, January 27, 1893
Party	Candidate	Votes	%
Democratic	John L. Mitchell	77	62.10%
Republican	John Coit Spooner	46	37.10%
Democratic	Edward S. Bragg	1 (Note: Democratic senator Robert Lees voted for Bragg.)	0.80%
	Absent or not voting	7	
	Vacant	2 (Note: Democratic senator Frederick W. Horn died January 15, 1893. Democratic representative Daniel A. Mahoney died in his hotel room in Madison on the morning of the joint session.)	
Majority		63	50.81%
Total votes		124	93.23%
Democratic gain from Republican			
