= Chauncey Depew =

American politician (1834–1928)

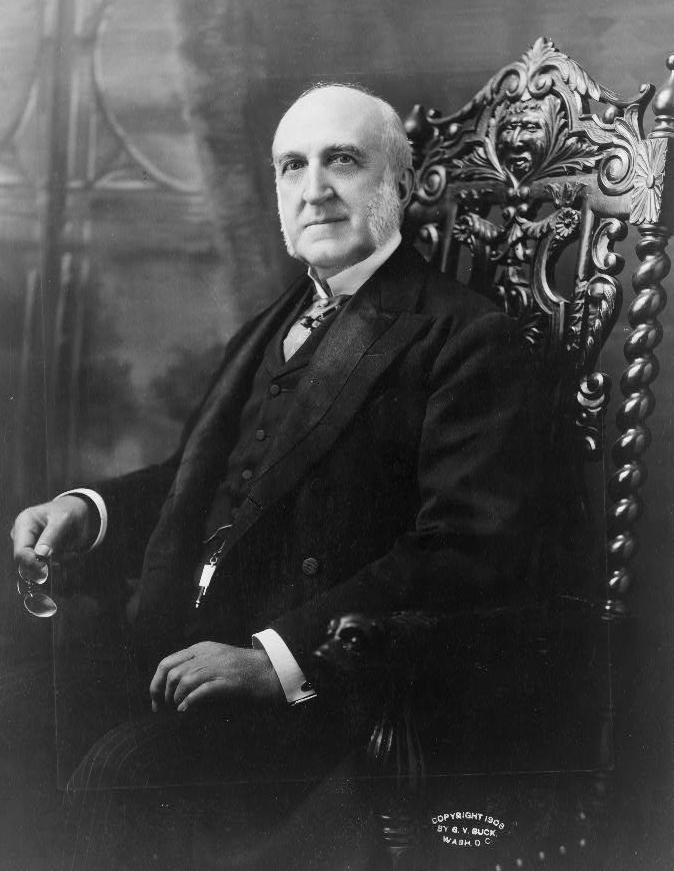
- Depew c. 1908

United States Senator from New York
- In office March 4, 1899 – March 3, 1911
- Preceded by: Edward Murphy Jr.
- Succeeded by: James Aloysius O'Gorman

Secretary of State of New York
- In office January 1, 1864 – December 31, 1865
- Governor: Horatio Seymour; Reuben Fenton
- Preceded by: Horatio Ballard
- Succeeded by: Francis C. Barlow

Member of the New York State Assembly from the 3rd Westchester district
- In office January 1, 1862 – December 31, 1863
- Preceded by: Benjamin F. Camp
- Succeeded by: George A. Brandreth

Personal details
- Born: Chauncey Mitchell Depew; April 23, 1834 Peekskill, New York, US
- Died: April 5, 1928 (aged 93) New York City, US
- Party: Republican; Liberal Republican (1872)
- Spouses: Elise A. Hegeman (m. 1871; w. 1893) May E. Palmer (m. 1901; d. 1928)
- Parent(s): Isaac Depew; Martha Minot Mitchell
- Education: Peekskill Military Academy
- Alma mater: Yale College
- Profession: Politician

Chauncey Mitchell Depew (April 23, 1834 – April 5, 1928) was an American attorney, businessman, and Republican politician. He is best remembered for his two terms as United States Senator from New York and for his work for Cornelius Vanderbilt, as an attorney and as president of the New York Central Railroad System.

== Early life ==
Depew was born in Peekskill, New York, on April 23, 1834, to Isaac Depew (1800–1869) and Martha Minot (Mitchell) Depew (1810–1885).

=== Family ===
Depew's father was a merchant and farmer who pioneered river transportation between Peekskill and New York and was descended from François DuPuy, a French Huguenot who purchased land from natives at the present site of Peekskill. Through his mother, Depew was descended from Rev. Josiah Sherman, who served as a chaplain with rank of captain in the Revolutionary War and who was the brother of American founding father Roger Sherman and Rev. Charles Chauncy, the second president of Harvard College.

=== Education ===
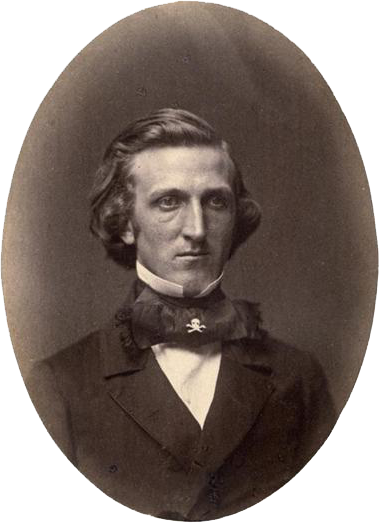
Chauncey Depew, Yale College Class of 1856 album.

Depew attended Peekskill Military Academy for 12 years before matriculating at Yale College in 1852. At Yale, Depew joined many clubs and won several honors. He won second dispute appointments in his junior and senior years and was an honored speaker at Junior Exhibition and Commencement. He joined the Thulia Boat Club, Kappa Sigma Epsilon, Kappa Sigma Theta, Psi Upsilon, and Skull and Bones. He served as third president of the Linonian Society. At Yale, he was a classmate of two future United States Supreme Court Justices, David Josiah Brewer and Henry Billings Brown. He graduated in 1856.

== Legal and business career ==
After graduating from Yale, Depew apprenticed in the office of Edward Wells in Peekskill and read law with William Nelson. He was admitted to the New York state bar in March 1858 and opened an office in Peekskill, where he practiced until 1861. For a few months, Depew engaged in the brokerage business in New York City as a member of the firm Depew & Potter, but then resumed his law practice in Peekskill. Depew later moved to New York City. During the American Civil War, Depew served as Adjutant of the 18th Regiment of the New York National Guard, and later Colonel and Judge Advocate of the 5th Division on the staff of Major General James W. Husted of the New York Guard.

In 1865, Depew was appointed and confirmed to the position of United States Minister to Japan, but he declined the appointment to pursue his career as a railroad and business lawyer.

=== Railroad attorney ===
In 1866, Depew became the attorney for New York & Harlem Railroad, owned by Cornelius Vanderbilt. Three years later, he took the same position for Vanderbilt's New York Central and Hudson River Railroad. Having earned recognition for his work with subsidiary companies, Depew became general counsel and director of the entire "Vanderbilt System" in 1876. He joined the executive board of the New York Central & Hudson River Railroad in 1882 and became its second vice president. In 1885, Depew was elected the railroad's president and served in that capacity until 1898 when he was succeeded by Samuel R. Callaway. Depew then became chairman of board of directors of New York Central Railroad Company until his death in 1928.

While Depew was primarily active in the Vanderbilt railroads, he held concurrent positions with many other railroads and companies. He was president of West Shore Railroad and served on the boards of directors for the New York and Harlem Railroad, the Chicago and North Western Railway, the Chicago, St. Paul, Minneapolis and Omaha Railway, the Cleveland, Cincinnati, Chicago and St. Louis Railroad, the Delaware and Hudson Railroad, the New Jersey Junction Railroad, the St. Lawrence and Adirondack Railroad, the Wallkill Valley Railroad, and the Canada Southern Railroad.

Aside from railroads, Depew also served on the boards of directors for Western Union, the Hudson River Bridge Company, the Niagara River Bridge Company, the New York State Realty & Terminal Company, the Union Trust Company, Equitable Life Assurance Company, and Kensico Cemetery Association.

== Political career ==
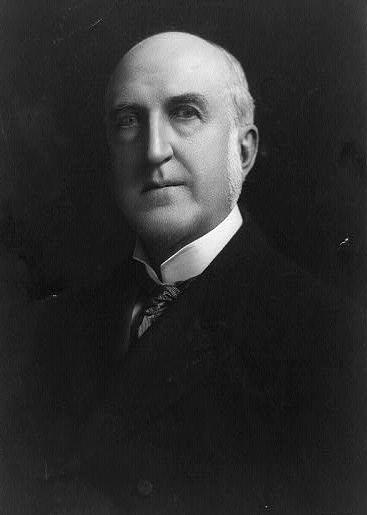
Chauncey M. Depew in 1901

As a young student and lawyer, Depew stumped the state of New York for John C. Frémont in 1856 and for Abraham Lincoln in 1860.

=== New York politics ===
Depew represented Westchester County in the New York State Assembly in 1862 and 1863. During the latter year, he sometimes acted as Speaker of the New York State Assembly pro tempore while Speaker Theophilus C. Callicot was under investigation. In 1863, he was elected Secretary of State of New York on the Union ticket and served from 1864 to 1865.

In 1867, Depew became clerk of Westchester County but resigned after a short service. In 1870, the New York Legislature named Depew Immigration Commissioner, but he declined to serve. Depew had also been commissioner of quarantine and president of Court of Claims of New York City as well as commissioner of taxes and assessments for the city and county of New York. Depew was one of the commissioners appointed to build the state capitol in 1874 and a member of the state's boundary commission in 1875.

In 1872, Depew ran for Lieutenant Governor of New York on the Liberal Republican-Democratic ticket but was defeated.

In 1886, Depew gave an oration at the unveiling of the Statue of Liberty.

On October 7, 1897, Depew inaugurated the New York pneumatic tube mail, declaring: "This is the age of speed. Everything that makes for speed contributes to happiness and is a distinct gain to civilization. We are ahead of the old countries in almost every respect, but we have been behind in methods of communication within our cities. In New York this condition of communication has hitherto been barbarous. If the Greater New York is to be a success, quick communication is absolutely necessary. I hope this system we have seen tried here to-day will soon be extended over all the Greater New York."

In 1898, Depew nominated Theodore Roosevelt for Governor of New York at the Republican state convention.

=== Presidential politics ===
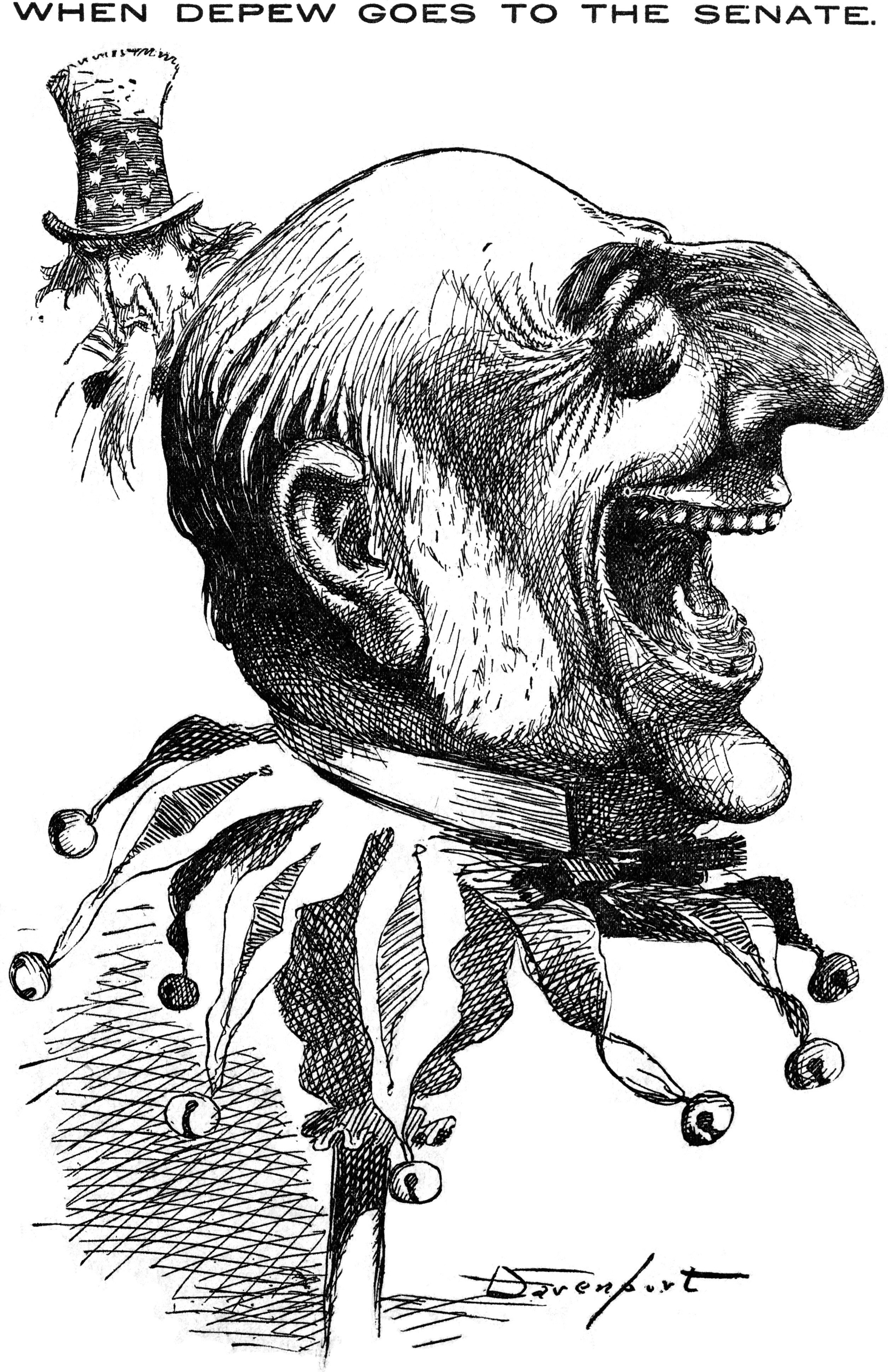
"When Depew goes to the Senate" by Homer Davenport, 1899

Depew served as a delegate-at-large to each Republican National Convention from 1888 to 1904 and was elected delegate to all following conventions, including 1928, being elected the day before he died. At the convention in 1888, Depew received 99 votes for the presidential nomination. He made presidential nominating speeches for Benjamin Harrison in 1892 and Governor Levi Morton in 1896. In 1904, he made the re-nominating speech for Vice President Charles Fairbanks.

=== U.S. Senate ===
Depew was a candidate for United States Senator in an 1881 special election, but withdrew his name from consideration after the 41st ballot. He also declined nomination as a senator in 1885.

In 1899, Depew was elected to the Senate from New York and was re-elected in 1905. He served from March 4, 1899, to March 3, 1911.

In 1906, David Graham Phillips began a muckraking series entitled "The Treason of the Senate" for William Randolph Hearst's new Cosmopolitan magazine, and targeted Depew in the first article. The article's sensational charges included labeling Depew a "boodler" owned "mentally and morally" by railroad magnates Cornelius and William Vanderbilt. The piece provoked outrage from President Roosevelt, the New York Sun and Senator Henry Cabot Lodge.

== Death ==
In spring 1928, Depew became ill while returning from Florida to Manhattan. He died of bronchial pneumonia in Manhattan on April 5, 1928. He was buried in the family mausoleum in Hillside Cemetery, Peekskill. In his honor, the huge concourse of Grand Central Terminal was draped in mourning.

== Personal life ==
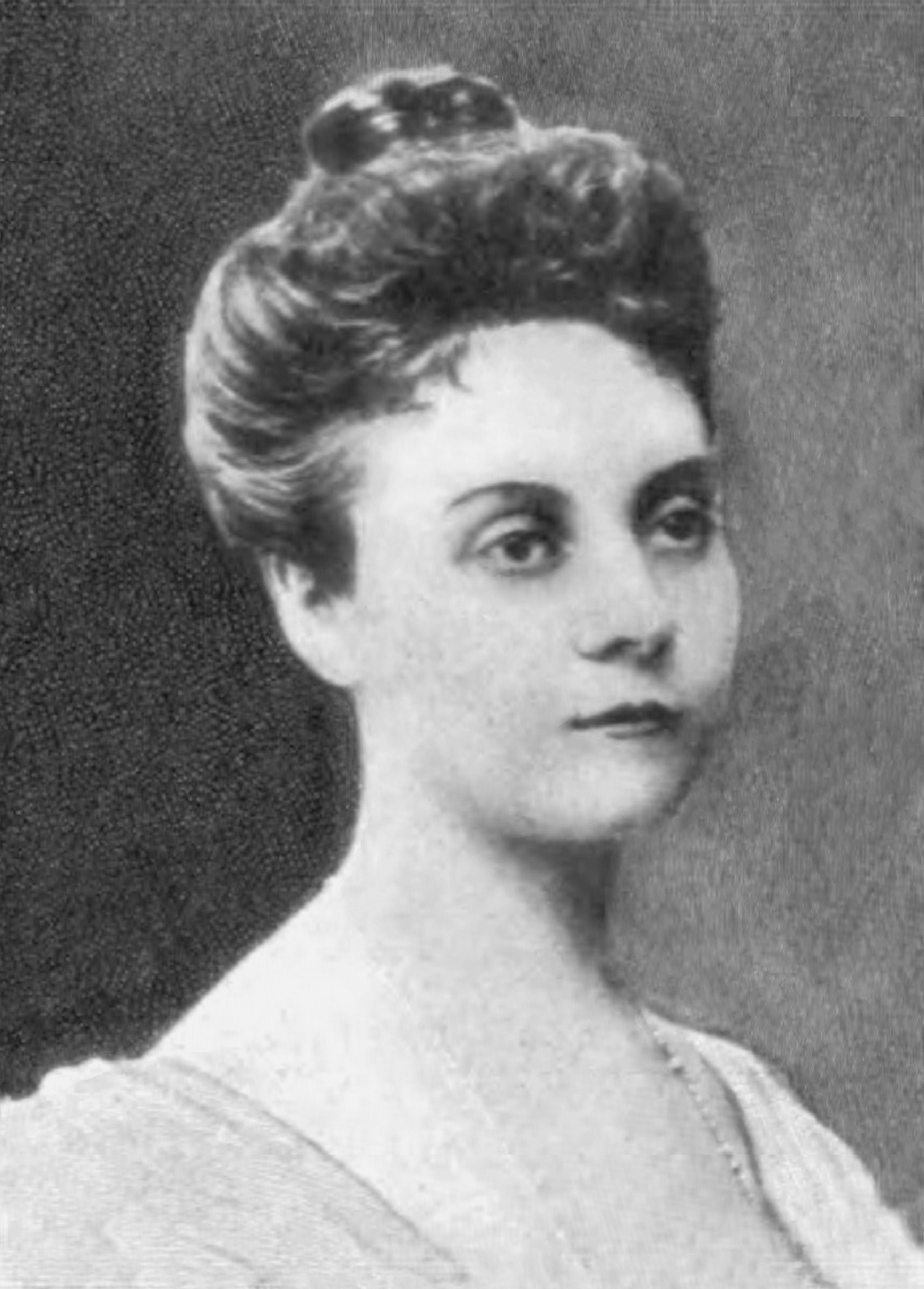
Depew's second wife, May Palmer

Depew married twice. On November 9, 1871, he married Elise Ann Hegeman (1848–93) in New York City. She was the daughter of William and Eliza Jane (Nevin) Hegeman. Before her death on May 7, 1893, they had one son, Chauncey Mitchell Depew Jr. (1879–1931), who died unmarried.

On December 27, 1901, he re-married to May Eugenie Palmer (1866–1940) in Nice, France. She was the daughter of Henry and Alice (Hermann) Palmer. In 1904, he was one of several high-profile investors who backed the Intercontinental Correspondence University, but the institution folded by 1915.

He attended Saint Thomas Episcopal Church in New York.

=== Yale ===
Depew was a member of the Yale Corporation (1888–1906). In 1887, Yale conferred him an honorary doctorate of letters. He was a founding member of the Yale Alumni Association of New York and served as its third president from 1883–92. He was also among those founding members of the Yale Club of New York City in 1897. He was a vice chairman of the $20,000,000 Yale Endowment Campaign and was elected an honorary member of Yale Class of 1889 in 1923. In his will, he left $1,000,000 to Yale without restrictions as to its use.

=== Civic associations ===
He served as trustee of his alma mater, the Peekskill Military Academy.

In 1877, Depew became a regent of the University of the State of New York and served until 1904.

Depew became a member of the New York Chamber of Commerce in 1885 and served as its vice president from 1904–08.

In 1918, Depew was made life member of Lawyers' Club of New York.

Depew was active in a number of patriotic and hereditary societies. He served as president of Empire State Society of the Sons of the American Revolution from 1890–99, the Pilgrims Society from 1918 until his death, and the Saint Nicholas Society. He joined the Union League in 1868 and served as its president for seven years. He was elected an honorary life member at the close of his presidency. He was also a member of the Connecticut Society of the Cincinnati, the New York Society of Colonial Wars, Holland Society, Huguenot Society and the New England Society of New York. Other cultural memberships included the Metropolitan Museum of Art, American Association for the Advancement of Science, France-America Society, New York Historical Society, Historical Society of St. Augustine, Florida, American Scenic and Historic Preservation Society, National Horse Show, Lafayette Post of the Grand Army of the Republic, and the citizens' committee to complete the Cathedral of St. John the Divine.

=== Health ===
Depew used to smoke 25 cigars a day but gave up smoking aged 65 upon the advice of his secretary. He gave up drinking alcohol at aged 88. Depew stated that he had worked "practically every day" of his life. He avoided stress and slept seven and half hours a day. In 1908, it was widely reported in newspapers that Depew had become a vegetarian. In a 1925 interview aged 90, Depew clarified that he had never been a vegetarian but in his early 60s removed red meat from his diet but consumed poultry. He commented that "Beefsteaks and roast butcher's meat figured too much in my diet, I concluded. Out they went, never to return. I'm not a vegetarian; wouldn't be one –that's going to extremes– but I don't eat need red meat and don't eat it. For thirty years the only meat I've eaten has been poultry."

=== Honors ===
Depew received the French Légion d'honneur in the rank of Officer.

Depew was an honorary member of the New York Genealogical and Biographical Society.

In 1887, Depew became an honorary member of Columbia chapter of Phi Beta Kappa.

== Legacy ==
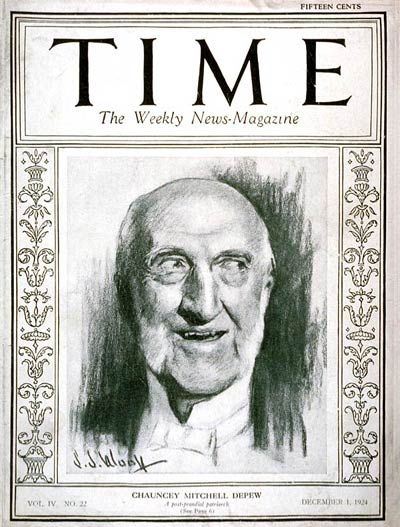
Depew on the December 1, 1924 cover of Time magazine

Depew was a distinguished orator and after-dinner speaker and published many of those speeches. Recordings of his speeches were commercially issued as gramophone discs by Zonophone Records in the late 1890s. Depew was remembered as a prodigious speaker years after his death; many years after his death, Senator Robert S. Kerr of Oklahoma quoted Depew in an attack on a Senator from Indiana: "As I gaze on the ample figure of my friend from Indiana, and as I listen to him, I am reminded of Chauncey Depew who said to the equally obese William Howard Taft at a dinner before the latter became President, 'I hope, if it is a girl, Mr. Taft will name it for his charming wife.' "To which Taft responded, 'if it is a girl, I shall, of course, name it for my lovely helpmate of many years. And if it is a boy, I shall claim the father's prerogative and name it Junior. But if, as I suspect, it is only a bag of wind, I shall name it Chauncey Depew.'"

In 1929, May Palmer-Depew donated her late husband's papers and $120,000 to establish a department of public speaking to George Washington University. The collection is currently cared for by the university's Special Collections Research Center, located in the Estelle and Melvin Gelman Library.

=== Namesakes ===
In 1908, Depew gave land to Peekskill, New York, which became Depew Park. A decade later he expanded the donation by 10 acres (40,000 m^{2}) and paid for a statue of himself for display in that park.

The Village of Depew, New York, a suburb of Buffalo, was incorporated in 1894 along the New York Central Railroad main line. The town of Depew, Oklahoma, is also named for him.

The ship Chauncey M. DePew was built for the Maine Central Railroad Company in 1913 to carry passengers to Bar Harbor. She worked along the Maine coast until 1925 when she was sold to the Day Line as an excursion boat between New York and Albany. In 1940 she was drafted to carry men and supplies between New York City and Fort Hancock on Sandy Hook. In 1950, she was sold to the government of Bermuda and spent the next 20 years as a ship's tender, harbor ferry, cruise ship and pilot boat. Back in the States, in 1971, a storm slammed her against a breakwater in Chesapeake Bay, where she lay for three years. She was refurbished and moored in the Hackensack River between Harmon Cove and the Hackensack River Route 3 Bridge, Another boat, a tugboat owned by the New York Central, was also named for him.

=== Depictions ===
Many artists painted Depew, including George Burroughs Torrey. The Swiss-born American artist Adolfo Müller-Ury painted Depew numerous times. A three-quarter length portrait of Depew seated on a bale of furs was exhibited at the Paris Salon in 1890 and is now in the Yale Club of New York City. Several other portraits followed including a portrait painted for the New York State Capitol at Albany showing Depew as he was in 1863 (now New York State Museum). The artist gave a bust-length portrait to the Museum at Peekskill in 1918. Copies of an etching Müller-Ury made of Depew, signed by the artist and the sitter, are in the American National Portrait Gallery in Washington, DC, the collection of the Newport Preservation Society of Rhode Island, and the University of Cincinnati College of Design. Müller-Ury also painted Depew's first wife in 1893, and his second wife in 1902 in 18th-century costume. In 1896, sculptor Victor D. Brenner created a small plaque in honor of his 60th birthday (which was two years earlier).

== Publications ==
=== Speeches ===
- Orations and After Dinner Speeches (1890)
- Life and Later Speeches (1894)
- Orations, Addresses and Speeches (eight volumes) (1910)
- Speeches and Addresses on the threshold of Eighty (1912)
- Addresses and Literary Contributions on the Threshold of Eighty-two (1916)
- Speeches and Literary Contributions on the Threshold of Eighty-four (1918)
- My Memories of Eighty Years and Marching On a/k/a My Autobiography (1922)
- Miscellaneous Speeches on the Threshold of Ninety-two (1925)
- "An Optimistic Survey", 50th Anniversary Supplement of the Yale Daily News (1928)

New York State Assembly
Preceded by Benjamin F. Camp	New York State Assembly; Westchester County, 3rd District; 1862–1863	Succeeded by George A. Brandreth
Political offices
Preceded by Horatio Ballard	New York Secretary of State; 1864–1865	Succeeded by Francis C. Barlow
U.S. Senate
Preceded by Edward Murphy Jr.	U.S. senator (Class 1) from New York; 1899–1911; Served alongside: Thomas C. Platt and Elihu Root	Succeeded by James A. O'Gorman
Honorary titles
Preceded by Cornelius Cole	Oldest living U.S. senator November 3, 1924 – April 5, 1928	Succeeded by Rebecca Felton
Awards and achievements
Preceded by William R. Inge	Cover of Time magazine 1 December 1924	Succeeded by Plutarco Calles
