= 1904–05 United States Senate elections =

- January 19, 1904 – April 20, 1905
- Class 1

30 of the 90 seats in the United States Senate (as well as special elections) 46 seats needed for a majority
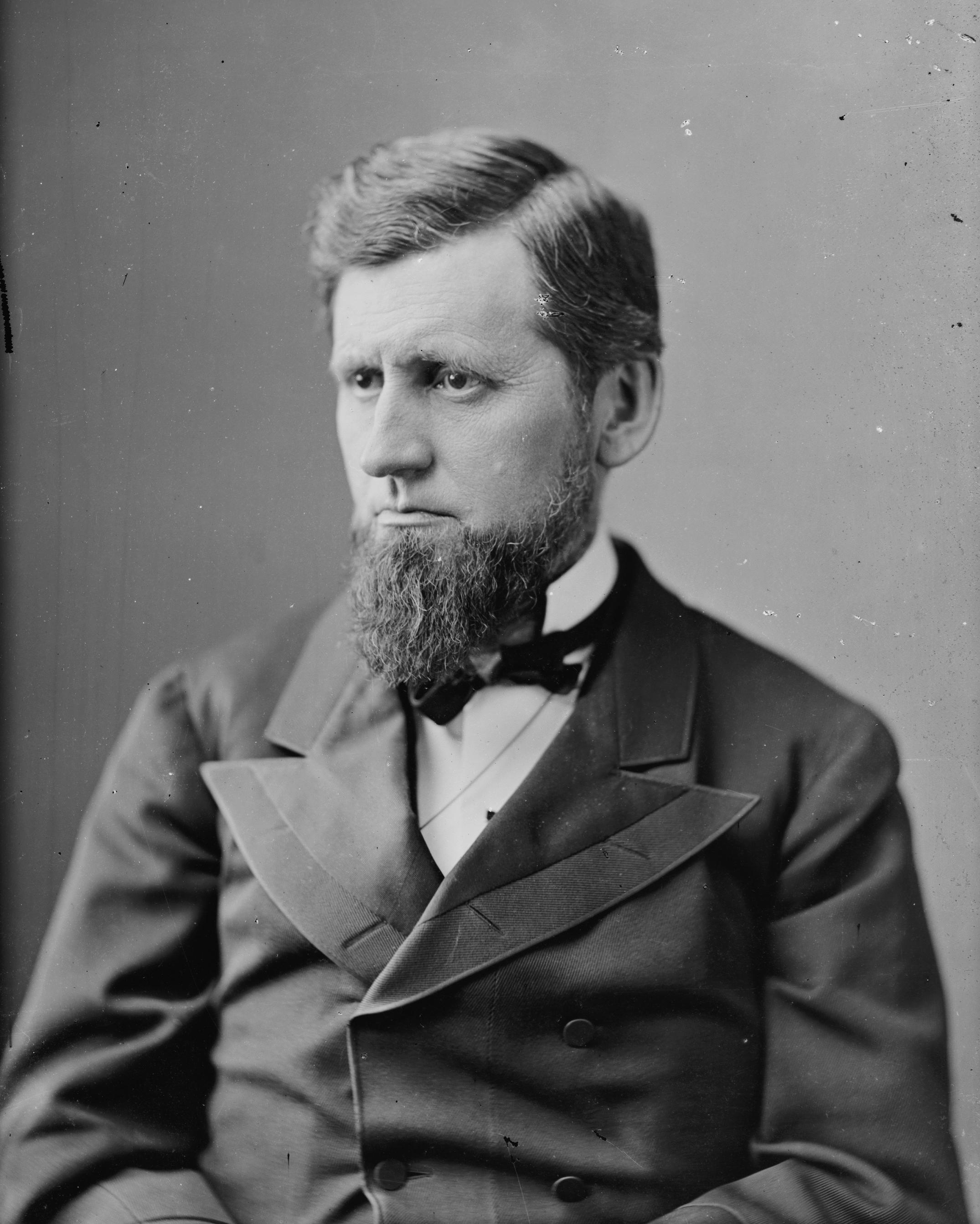

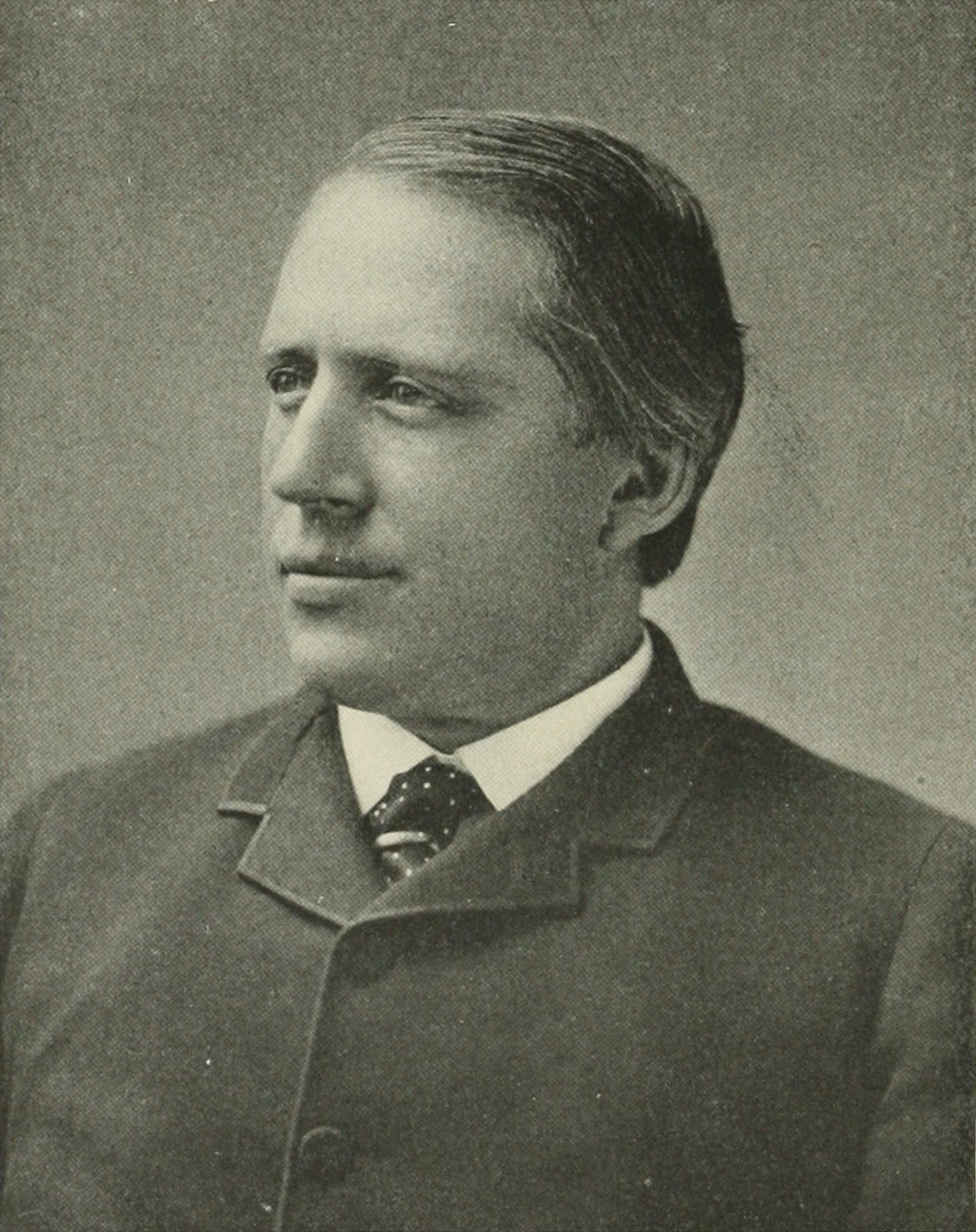
	Majority party	Minority party
Leader	William B. Allison	Arthur P. Gorman (retired)
Party	Republican	Democratic
Leader since	March 4, 1897	March 4, 1903
Leader's seat	Iowa	Maryland
Seats before	57	33
Seats won	22	5
Seats after	57	32
Seat change	Steady	▼1
Seats up	23	7
- Results of the elections: Democratic gain Democratic hold Republican gain Republican hold Legislature failed to elect
Majority Party before election
Republican
Elected Majority Party
Republican

The 1904–05 United States Senate elections were elections for the United States Senate between January 19, 1904, and April 20, 1905, coinciding with President Theodore Roosevelt's landslide election to a full term and the 1904 House of Representatives elections. As these U.S. Senate elections were prior to the ratification of the Seventeenth Amendment in 1913, senators were chosen by state legislatures. Senators were elected over a wide range of time throughout 1904 and 1905, and a seat may have been filled months late or remained vacant due to legislative deadlock. In these elections, terms were up for the senators in Class 1.

== Events of the election ==
The party share of seats remained roughly the same, when including vacancies and appointments, and the Republicans retained a significant majority over the Democrats.

Special elections were held in Indiana and Massachusetts, in the former due to the ascension of Charles Fairbanks to the Vice Presidency and in the latter due to the death of longtime Senator George Hoar.

In Georgia, the legislature failed to elect until shortly after the beginning of the 59th Congress on March 4. In Delaware the legislature deadlocked and did not elect a senator until June 1906.

== Results summary ==
Senate party division, 59th Congress (1905–1907)

- Majority party: Republican (58)
- Minority party: Democratic (32)
- Other parties: (0)
- Total seats: 90

== Shifts in party control post-election ==
Despite legislative deadlocks and the long periods of vacancy in some states, the Republican Party's dominance in the Senate was further solidified in these elections. The party's strong performance in the Senate mirrored President Theodore Roosevelt's landslide victory in the 1904 presidential election. This continuity of Republican control in both the executive and legislative branches contributed to the implementation of Roosevelt's progressive policies, such as trust-busting and railroad regulation, further cementing the party's influence during the early 20th century.

== Change in Senate composition ==
=== Before the elections ===
At the beginning of 1904.

					D_{1}	D_{2}	D_{3}	D_{4}	D_{5}
D_{15}	D_{14}	D_{13}	D_{12}	D_{11}	D_{10}	D_{9}	D_{8}	D_{7}	D_{6}
D_{16}	D_{17}	D_{18}	D_{19}	D_{20}	D_{21}	D_{22}	D_{23}	D_{24}	D_{25}
R_{56} Retired	R_{57} Retired	D_{33} Retired	D_{32} Ran	D_{31} Ran	D_{30} Ran	D_{29} Ran	D_{28} Ran	D_{27} Ran	D_{26}
R_{55} Retired	R_{54} Retired	R_{53} Retired	R_{52} Retired	R_{51} Ran but died	R_{50} Ran	R_{49} Ran	R_{48} Ran	R_{47} Ran	R_{46} Ran
Majority →									R_{46} Ran
R_{36} Ran	R_{37} Ran	R_{38} Ran	R_{39} Ran	R_{40} Ran	R_{41} Ran	R_{42} Ran	R_{43} Ran	R_{44} Ran	R_{45} Ran
R_{35} Ran	R_{34}	R_{33}	R_{32}	R_{31}	R_{30}	R_{29}	R_{28}	R_{27}	R_{26}
R_{16}	R_{17}	R_{18}	R_{19}	R_{20}	R_{21}	R_{22}	R_{23}	R_{24}	R_{25}
R_{15}	R_{14}	R_{13}	R_{12}	R_{11}	R_{10}	R_{9}	R_{8}	R_{7}	R_{6}
					R_{1}	R_{2}	R_{3}	R_{4}	R_{5}

=== Result of the general elections ===
					D_{1}	D_{2}	D_{3}	D_{4}	D_{5}
D_{15}	D_{14}	D_{13}	D_{12}	D_{11}	D_{10}	D_{9}	D_{8}	D_{7}	D_{6}
D_{16}	D_{17}	D_{18}	D_{19}	D_{20}	D_{21}	D_{22}	D_{23}	D_{24}	D_{25}
R_{56} Gain	V_{1} R Loss	V_{2} D Loss	V_{3} D Loss	D_{31} Gain	D_{30} Re-elected	D_{29} Re-elected	D_{28} Re-elected	D_{27} Re-elected	D_{26}
R_{55} Hold	R_{54} Hold	R_{53} Hold	R_{52} Hold	R_{51} Hold	R_{50} Hold	R_{49} Hold	R_{48} Re-elected	R_{47} Re-elected	R_{46} Re-elected
Majority →									R_{46} Re-elected
R_{36} Re-elected	R_{37} Re-elected	R_{38} Re-elected	R_{39} Re-elected	R_{40} Re-elected	R_{41} Re-elected	R_{42} Re-elected	R_{43} Re-elected	R_{44} Re-elected	R_{45} Re-elected
R_{35} Re-elected	R_{34}	R_{33}	R_{32}	R_{31}	R_{30}	R_{29}	R_{28}	R_{27}	R_{26}
R_{16}	R_{17}	R_{18}	R_{19}	R_{20}	R_{21}	R_{22}	R_{23}	R_{24}	R_{25}
R_{15}	R_{14}	R_{13}	R_{12}	R_{11}	R_{10}	R_{9}	R_{8}	R_{7}	R_{6}
					R_{1}	R_{2}	R_{3}	R_{4}	R_{5}

=== Beginning of the next Congress ===
					D_{1}	D_{2}	D_{3}	D_{4}	D_{5}
D_{15}	D_{14}	D_{13}	D_{12}	D_{11}	D_{10}	D_{9}	D_{8}	D_{7}	D_{6}
D_{16}	D_{17}	D_{18}	D_{19}	D_{20}	D_{21}	D_{22}	D_{23}	D_{24}	D_{25}
R_{56}	V_{1}	V_{2}	D_{32} Appointed	D_{31}	D_{30}	D_{29}	D_{28}	D_{27}	D_{26}
R_{55}	R_{54}	R_{53}	R_{52}	R_{51}	R_{50}	R_{49}	R_{48}	R_{47}	R_{46}
Majority →									R_{46}
R_{36}	R_{37}	R_{38}	R_{39}	R_{40}	R_{41}	R_{42}	R_{43}	R_{44}	R_{45}
R_{35}	R_{34}	R_{33}	R_{32}	R_{31}	R_{30}	R_{29}	R_{28}	R_{27}	R_{26}
R_{16}	R_{17}	R_{18}	R_{19}	R_{20}	R_{21}	R_{22}	R_{23}	R_{24}	R_{25}
R_{15}	R_{14}	R_{13}	R_{12}	R_{11}	R_{10}	R_{9}	R_{8}	R_{7}	R_{6}
					R_{1}	R_{2}	R_{3}	R_{4}	R_{5}

Key:

D_{#}	Democratic
R_{#}	Republican
V_{#}	Vacant

== Race summaries ==
=== Elections during the 58th Congress ===
==== Special elections ====
In these elections, the winners were seated during 1904 or in 1905 before March 4; ordered by election date.

State	Incumbent			Results	Candidates
State	Senator	Party	Electoral history	Results	Candidates
Ohio (Class 1)	Mark Hanna	Republican	1897 (appointed); 1898 (special); 1898	Incumbent died February 15, 1904. New senator elected March 2, 1904. Republican hold. Winner was also elected to the next term; see below.	▌ ✓ Charles W. F. Dick (Republican) 174; ▌John Hessin Clarke (Democratic) 25
Pennsylvania (Class 1)	Matthew Quay	Republican	1887; 1893; 1899 (failure to elect); 1899 (appointed; disqualified); 1901 (special)	Incumbent died May 28, 1904. New senator elected January 17, 1905. Republican hold. Winner was also elected to the next term; see below.	▌ ✓ Philander C. Knox (Republican) 100%
Massachusetts (Class 2)	Winthrop M. Crane	Republican	1904 (appointed)	Interim appointee elected January 18, 1905.	▌ ✓ Winthrop M. Crane (Republican); [data missing]

In this election, the winner was seated March 4, 1905.

State	Incumbent			Results	Candidates
State	Senator	Party	Electoral history	Results	Candidates
Indiana (Class 3)	Charles W. Fairbanks	Republican	1897; 1903	Incumbent resigned March 3, 1905, to become U.S. Vice President. New senator elected January 18, 1905 to begin service on the first day of the new Congress. Republican hold.	▌ ✓ James A. Hemenway (Republican) 100%

==== Early elections ====
In these elections, the winners were seated March 4, 1907, in the 60th Congress; ordered by election date.

State	Incumbent			Results	Candidates
State	Senator	Party	Electoral history	Results	Candidates
Mississippi (Class 2)	Anselm J. McLaurin	Democratic	1894 (special); 1900	Incumbent re-elected early January 19, 1904.	▌ ✓ Anselm J. McLaurin (Democratic); Unopposed
Louisiana (Class 2)	Murphy J. Foster	Democratic	1900	Incumbent re-elected early May 18, 1904.	▌ ✓ Murphy J. Foster (Democratic) 148; Unopposed

=== Races leading to the 59th Congress ===
In these general elections, the winners were elected for the term beginning March 4, 1905; ordered by state.

All of the elections involved the Class 1 seats.

State	Incumbent			Results	Candidates
State	Senator	Party	Electoral history	Results	Candidates
California	Thomas R. Bard	Republican	1900	Incumbent lost renomination. New senator elected January 11, 1905. Republican hold.	▌ ✓ Frank Flint (Republican) 111; ▌Theodore Arlington Bell (Democratic) 8
Connecticut	Joseph R. Hawley	Republican	1881; 1887; 1893	Incumbent retired. New senator elected January 17, 1905. Republican hold.	▌ ✓ Morgan Bulkeley (Republican) 228; ▌A. Heaton Robertson (Democratic) 37
Delaware	L. Heisler Ball	Republican	1903 (special)	Incumbent retired. Legislature failed to elect. Republican loss. Seat remained vacant until June 13, 1906.	▌J. Edward Addicks (Union Republican); ▌Willard Saulsbury Jr. (Democratic); ▌Henry A. du Pont (Republican); ▌James H. Hughes (Democratic)
Florida	James Taliaferro	Democratic	1899 (special)	Legislature failed to elect. Democratic loss. Incumbent would be appointed to start the term. Appointee was later elected to finish the term; see below.	[data missing]
Indiana	Albert J. Beveridge	Republican	1899	Incumbent re-elected January 18, 1905.	▌ ✓ Albert J. Beveridge (Republican); Unopposed
Maine	Eugene Hale	Republican	1881; 1887; 1893; 1899	Incumbent re-elected.	First ballot (January 17, 1905): ▌ ✓ Eugene Hale (Republican) 101 H; 24 S; ▌Lindley Murray Staples (Democratic) 22 H; 4 S; ▌Absent 28 H; 3 S
Maryland	Louis E. McComas	Republican	1898	Incumbent lost re-election. New senator elected February 4, 1904. Democratic gain.	▌ ✓ Isidor Rayner (Democratic) 70.49%; ▌Louis E. McComas (Republican) 29.51%
Massachusetts	Henry Cabot Lodge	Republican	1893; 1899	Incumbent re-elected January 18, 1905.	▌ ✓ Henry Cabot Lodge (Republican) 198; ▌William A. Gaston (Democratic) 72
Michigan	Julius C. Burrows	Republican	1899	Incumbent re-elected January 18, 1905.	▌ ✓ Julius C. Burrows (Republican); Unopposed
Minnesota	Moses E. Clapp	Republican	1901	Incumbent re-elected January 18, 1905.	▌ ✓ Moses E. Clapp (Republican); Unopposed
Mississippi	Hernando Money	Democratic	1897 (appointed); 1899	Incumbent re-elected January 19, 1904.	▌ ✓ Hernando Money (Democratic); Unopposed
Missouri	Francis Cockrell	Democratic	1874; 1881; 1887; 1893; 1899	Incumbent lost re-election. Legislature failed to elect. Democratic loss.	▌William Warner (Republican); ▌Francis Cockrell (Democratic); ▌Thomas K. Niedringhaus (Republican)
Montana	Paris Gibson	Democratic	1901 (special)	Incumbent retired. New senator elected January 16, 1905. Republican gain.	▌ ✓ Thomas H. Carter (Republican) 62; ▌W. C. Conrad (Democratic) 28; ▌Martin Dee (Fusion) 6; Scattering 6
Nebraska	Charles H. Dietrich	Republican	1901 (special)	Incumbent retired. New senator elected January 17, 1905. Republican hold.	▌ ✓ Elmer Burkett (Republican) 92.19%; ▌Richard Lee Metcalfe (Democratic) 7.03%; ▌Alfred Sorenson (Republican) 0.78%
Nevada	William M. Stewart	Republican	1887; 1893; 1899	Incumbent retired. New senator elected January 25, 1905. Republican hold.	▌ ✓ George S. Nixon (Republican) 31; ▌John Sparks (Democratic) 25
New Jersey	John Kean	Republican	1899	Incumbent re-elected January 2, 1905.	▌ ✓ John Kean (Republican); Unopposed
New York	Chauncey Depew	Republican	1899	Incumbent re-elected January 18, 1905.	▌ ✓ Chauncey Depew (Republican) 136; ▌Smith M. Weed (Democratic) 57
North Dakota	Porter J. McCumber	Republican	1899	Incumbent re-elected January 18, 1905.	▌ ✓ Porter J. McCumber (Republican); Unopposed
Ohio	Mark Hanna	Republican	1897 (appointed); 1898 (special); 1898	Incumbent re-elected, but died February 15, 1904. New senator elected March 2, 1904. Republican hold. Winner was also elected to finish the term; see above.	▌ ✓ Charles W. F. Dick (Republican) 174; ▌John Hessin Clarke (Democratic) 25
Pennsylvania	Philander C. Knox	Republican	1904 (appointed); 1905 (special)	Incumbent re-elected January 18, 1905.	▌ ✓ Philander C. Knox (Republican) 225; ▌James Knox Polk Hall (Democratic) 25
Rhode Island	Nelson W. Aldrich	Republican	1881 (special); 1886; 1892; 1898	Incumbent re-elected January 18, 1905.	▌ ✓ Nelson W. Aldrich (Republican) 93; ▌George W. Greene (Democratic) 17
Tennessee	William B. Bate	Democratic	1887; 1893; 1899	Incumbent re-elected January 11, 1905.	▌ ✓ William B. Bate (Democratic); ▌Walter P. Brownlow (Republican)
Texas	Charles A. Culberson	Democratic	1899	Incumbent re-elected January 25, 1905.	▌ ✓ Charles A. Culberson (Democratic); Unopposed
Utah	Thomas Kearns	Republican	1901 (special)	Incumbent retired. New senator elected January 18, 1905. Republican hold.	▌ ✓ George Sutherland (Republican) 57; ▌William H. King (Democratic) 6
Vermont	Redfield Proctor	Republican	1891 (appointed); 1892 (special); 1892; 1898	Incumbent re-elected October 18, 1904.	▌ ✓ Redfield Proctor (Republican) 205; ▌John H. Senter (Democratic) 31
Virginia	John W. Daniel	Democratic	1887; 1893; 1899	Incumbent re-elected January 26, 1904.	▌ ✓ John W. Daniel (Democratic); Unopposed
Washington	Addison G. Foster	Republican	1899	Incumbent lost re-election. New senator elected January 27, 1905. Republican hold.	▌ ✓ Samuel H. Piles (Republican) 125; ▌Addison G. Foster (Republican) 2; ▌George Turner (Democratic) 6
West Virginia	Nathan B. Scott	Republican	1899	Incumbent re-elected January 25, 1905.	▌ ✓ Nathan B. Scott (Republican) 82; ▌John T. McGraw (Democratic) 27
Wisconsin	Joseph V. Quarles	Republican	1899	Incumbent lost renomination. New senator elected January 25, 1905. Republican hold.	▌ ✓ Robert M. La Follette (Republican) 82.11%; ▌ Martin L. Lueck (Democratic) 12.20%; ▌ Victor L. Berger (Socialist) 4.07%; ▌ Joseph V. Quarles (Republican) 1.63%
Wyoming	Clarence D. Clark	Republican	1895 (special); 1899	Incumbent re-elected January 25, 1905.	▌ ✓ Clarence D. Clark (Republican); Unopposed

=== Elections during the 59th Congress ===
In these elections, the winners were elected in 1905 after March 4; sorted by election date.

State	Incumbent			Results	Candidates
State	Senator	Party	Electoral history	Results	Candidates
Missouri (Class 1)	Vacant			Legislature had failed to elect. New senator elected March 18, 1905. Republican gain.	▌ ✓ William Warner (Republican) 91; ▌Francis Cockrell (Democratic) 83; ▌Thomas K. Niedringhaus (Republican) 1
Tennessee (Class 1)	William B. Bate	Democratic	1887; 1893; 1899; 1905	Incumbent died March 9, 1905, having just been re-elected. New senator elected March 21, 1905. Democratic hold.	▌ ✓ James B. Frazier (Democratic); ▌Walter P. Brownlow (Republican)
Florida (Class 1)	James Taliaferro	Democratic	1899 (special); 1905 (appointed)	Legislature had failed to elect. Incumbent was appointed to begin the term. Interim appointee elected April 20, 1905.	▌ ✓ James Taliaferro (Democratic); [data missing]
Connecticut (Class 3)	Orville H. Platt	Republican	1879; 1885; 1891; 1897; 1903	Incumbent died April 21, 1905. New senator elected May 10, 1905. Republican hold.	▌ ✓ Frank B. Brandegee (Republican) 227; ▌Henry A. Bishop (Democratic) 34

== Maryland ==
1904 United States Senate election in Maryland
- February 9, 1904

80 members of the Maryland General Assembly
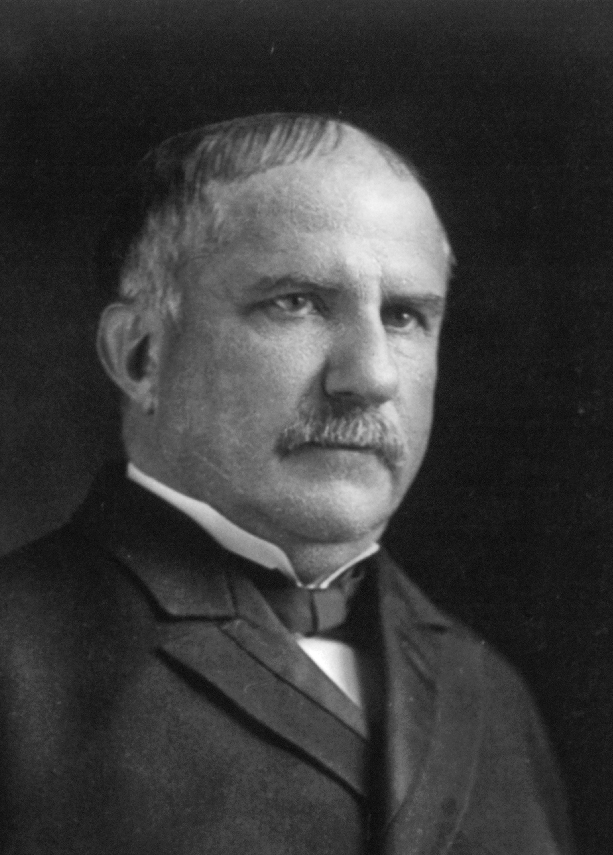

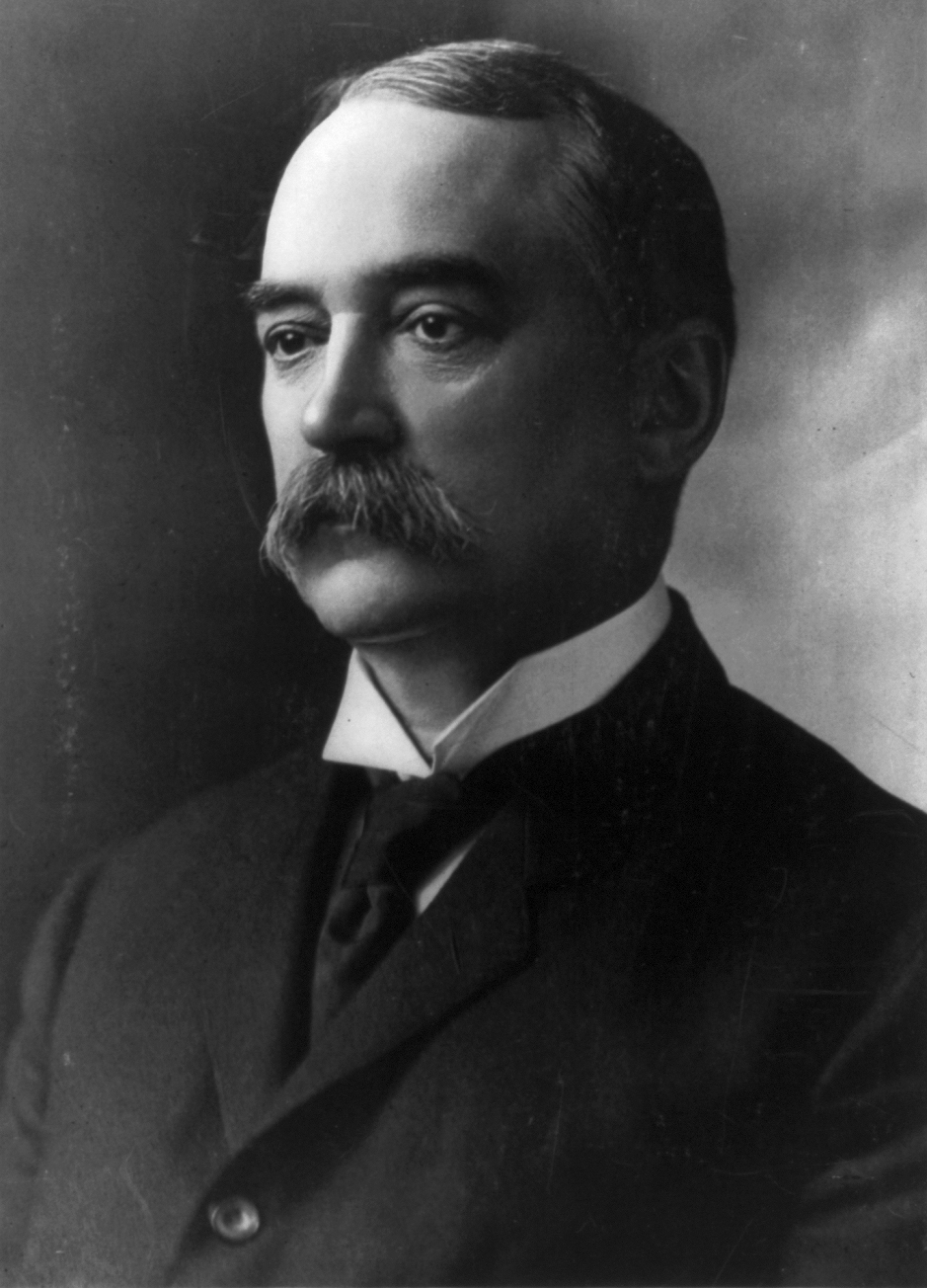
Candidate	Isidor Rayner	Louis E. McComas
Party	Democratic	Republican
Legislative vote	80	36
Percentage	70.49%	29.51

Isidor Rayner defeated incumbent Louis E. McComas by a margin of 40.98%, or 50 votes, for the Class 1 seat.

== New York ==
The 1905 election in New York was held on January 17, 1905, by the New York State Legislature. Republican Chauncey M. Depew had been elected to this seat in 1899, and his term would expire on March 3, 1905. At the state election in November 1904, large Republican majorities were elected for a two-year term (1905–1906) in the State Senate, and for the session of 1905 to the Assembly. The 128th State Legislature met on January 3, 1905, at Albany, New York.

Late in 1904, ex-Governor Frank S. Black tried to be nominated to succeed Depew. Black was supported by Governor Benjamin B. Odell Jr., but after intense fighting behind the scenes, Odell finally dropped Black and accepted Depew's re-election, which had been supported by his fellow Senator Thomas C. Platt and Speaker S. Frederick Nixon. The Republican caucus met on January 16. They re-nominated the incumbent U.S. Senator Chauncey M. Depew unanimously.

The Democratic caucus met also on January 16. They nominated again Smith M. Weed who had been the candidate of the Democratic minority in the U.S. Senate election of 1887.

1905 Democratic caucus for United States Senator result
Candidate	First ballot
✓ Smith M. Weed	42
D. Cady Herrick	14

Chauncey M. Depew was the choice of both the Assembly and the State Senate, and was declared elected.

1905 United States Senator election result
Office	House	Republican		Democrat
State Senate (50 members)	✓ Chauncey M. Depew	36	Smith M. Weed	13
State Assembly (150 members)	✓ Chauncey M. Depew	100	Smith M. Weed	44

Note: The votes were cast on January 17, but both Houses met in a joint session on January 18 to compare nominations, and declare the result.

== Pennsylvania ==
The election in Pennsylvania was held on January 17, 1905. Incumbent Philander C. Knox was elected by the Pennsylvania State Assembly to his first full term in the United States Senate.

Republican Matthew Quay was elected by the Pennsylvania General Assembly to the United States Senate in the previous election in January 1901. He served until his death on May 28, 1904. In June 1904, Republican Philander C. Knox was appointed to serve out the remainder of Quay's term, ending on March 4, 1905, when he began a term in his own right.

The Pennsylvania General Assembly, consisting of the House of Representatives and Senate, convened on January 17, 1905, to elect a Senator to serve the term beginning on March 4, 1905. The results of the vote of both houses combined are as follows:

State Legislature results
Party	Candidate	Votes	%
Republican	Philander C. Knox (incumbent)	222	87.40
Democratic	James K. P. Hall	23	9.06
N/A	Not voting	9	3.54
Totals		254	100.00%

== See also ==
- 1904 United States elections
  - 1904 United States presidential election
  - 1904 United States House of Representatives elections
- 58th United States Congress
- 59th United States Congress
