= Charles H. Parker =

19th century American politician

5th & 21st Mayor of Beloit, Wisconsin
- In office April 1884 – April 1887
- Preceded by: Carlos P. Whitford
- Succeeded by: Erastus G. Smith
- In office April 1861 – April 1862
- Preceded by: John Bannister
- Succeeded by: Roger H. Mills

Member of the Wisconsin State Assembly
- In office January 7, 1878 – January 6, 1879
- Preceded by: Sereno Merrill
- Succeeded by: Richard Burdge
- Constituency: Rock 1st district
- In office January 6, 1868 – January 3, 1870
- Preceded by: Horatio J. Murray
- Succeeded by: John Hammond
- Constituency: Rock 4th district

Personal details
- Born: November 16, 1814 Newton, Massachusetts, U.S.
- Died: March 3, 1890 (aged 75) Beloit, Wisconsin, U.S.
- Resting place: Oakwood Cemetery, Beloit
- Party: Republican; Greenback (1877–1880)
- Spouse: Eleanor Stone (m. 1839–1890)
- Children: Lowell Holden Parker^{(b. 1848; died 1937)}
- Occupation: Machinist

Charles H. Parker (November 16, 1814 – March 3, 1890) was an American cutler, manufacturer, politician, and Wisconsin pioneer. He was the 5th and 21st mayor of Beloit, Wisconsin, serving from 1861 to 1862 and from 1884 to 1887. He also represented Beloit for three terms in the Wisconsin State Assembly (1868, 1869, 1878). For most of his political career he was a Republican, but he was a Greenbacker for his 1878 legislative term.

== Background ==
Parker was born in Newton, Massachusetts, on November 16. 1814, and received a common school education. His father was a sea captain, and died when Charles was a small boy. His family moved to Dedham, Massachusetts, when he was ten years old and to Canton, Massachusetts, when he was sixteen. He moved to Concord, New Hampshire, in 1837, where he was a cutler for some time. He "came west" in the spring of 1848, and first settled at Belvidere, Illinois, where he managed the farm of a Dr. Jonathan Stone near that city. He married Eleanor Stone, Dr. Stone's daughter (like him a native of Massachusetts, and a Universalist).

He took up work as a machinist in a Beloit reaper factory the next year for $1 a day, and would walk back home to his family in Belvidere on Friday evenings, returning to his job on the following Monday morning. In 1850 he permanently moved Eleanor and their family to Beloit. In 1852 he and his partner, brother-in-law Gustavus Stone, went into business together, building all the machinery necessary to their industry. They commenced by first making hoes and then expanding to such implements as grain sickles and blades for mowing machines. Parker would end up the president of the Parker & Stone Reaper Company. (It was while working for Parker and Stone that John Appleby developed his famous Appleby Twine Binder)

== Public office ==
Parker served as an alderman of the city of Beloit most of the time from 1857 into the 1880s, and was mayor in 1861. He repeatedly served as a member of the county board, and was twice elected to Rock County's 4th Assembly district (the City of Beloit, and the Towns of Beloit, Newark and Turtle) as a Republican for 1868 and 1869 (succeeding Horatio Murray). He was succeeded by fellow Republican John Hammond.

In 1876 Parker was once more elected to the Assembly, from Rock County's reapportioned 1st Assembly district (now the city of Beloit, and the Towns of Avon, Beloit, Center, Newark, Magnolia, Plymouth, Spring Valley, and Union), this time as a Greenback; he received 1,079 votes against 972 for Republican William Alcott. (Republican incumbent Sereno Merrill was not a candidate for reelection.) He was chiefly responsible for the formation of an alliance between the Greenback and Democratic members of the Assembly.

In 1878 Parker was the Greenback nominee for the Forty-Sixth Congress for the First Wisconsin District; incumbent Charles G. Williams won 14,629 votes to Parker's 9,949 (Parker was endorsed by the Democrats as well). There was no Greenback candidate for his Assembly seat, which was taken by Republican Richard Burdge.

== Banking and personal life ==
Parker & Stone Reaper went out of business in 1878, and the business eventually was taken over by his son Lowell Holden Parker and a partner, Fred A. Dennett, who ended up moving the factory to Milwaukee in 1881, where it became known as "Milwaukee Harvester" until after its 1902 purchase by International Harvester. Holden sold his interest, and returned to Beloit, where father and son opened the Second National Bank of Beloit, of which Charles remained president until his death on March 14, 1890. (Eleanor would die March 24, 1900, at the age of 81.) L. Holden Parker would succeed his father as president of the bank; and would eventually serve one term (as a Republican) in the Assembly district which then included Beloit.

Wisconsin State Assembly
Preceded by Horatio J. Murray	Member of the Wisconsin State Assembly from the Rock 4th district January 6, 1868 – January 3, 1870	Succeeded by John Hammond
Preceded by Sereno Merrill	Member of the Wisconsin State Assembly from the Rock 1st district January 7, 1878 – January 6, 1879	Succeeded by Richard Burdge
Political offices
Preceded by John Bannister	Mayor of Beloit, Wisconsin; April 1861 – April 1862	Succeeded by Roger H. Mills
Preceded by Carlos P. Whitford	Mayor of Beloit, Wisconsin; April 1884 – April 1887	Succeeded by Erastus G. Smith
