= 1852 Connecticut lieutenant gubernatorial election =

- April 7, 1852
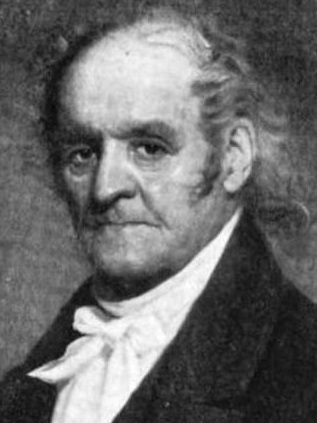

Nominee	Charles H. Pond	Roger H. Mills
Party	Democratic	Whig
Popular vote	31,541	28,639
Percentage	50.10%	45.50%
Lieutenant Governor before election
Green Kendrick
Whig
Elected Lieutenant Governor
Charles H. Pond
Democratic

The 1852 Connecticut lieutenant gubernatorial election was held on April 7, 1852, to elect the lieutenant governor of Connecticut. Former Democratic lieutenant governor Charles H. Pond won the election against Whig nominee and former Secretary of State of Connecticut Roger H. Mills.

== General election ==
On election day, April 2, 1852, former Democratic lieutenant governor Charles H. Pond won the election with 50.10% of the vote, thereby gaining Democratic control over the office of lieutenant governor. Pond was sworn in for his second non-consecutive term on May 7, 1852.

=== Results ===
Connecticut lieutenant gubernatorial election, 1852
Party	Candidate	Votes	%
Democratic	Charles H. Pond	31,541	50.10
Whig	Roger H. Mills	28,639	45.50
	Scattering	2,807	4.40
Total votes		62,987	100.00
Democratic gain from Whig			
