= 1901 United States Senate special election in Pennsylvania =

The 1901 United States Senate special election in Pennsylvania was held on January 15, 1901, after the regularly scheduled legislative election in January—April 1899 failed to elect a Senator. Former Senator Matthew Quay, who had left the Senate for nearly two years because of the political stalemate, was again elected by the Pennsylvania General Assembly to the United States Senate.

== Background ==
Republican Matthew Quay was re-elected by the Pennsylvania General Assembly, consisting of the House of Representatives and the Senate, in the 1893 election. With Sen. Quay's term expiring on March 4, 1899, the General Assembly convened on January 18, 1899, to elect a Senator for the next term. Between January 18 and April 19, 1899, seventy-nine ballots were recorded in an attempt to elect a Senator. Instead, the legislature adjourned sine die without electing a Senator due to a dispute between Sen. Quay's political machine and an anti-Quay faction within the Republican Party, along with Democratic Party opposition.

Sen. Quay's term expired on March 4, 1899. Since a Senator had not been elected for the successive term, the seat was vacated. At the time, Quay was under indictment for misuse of funds. He was acquitted, after which Governor William Stone appointed Quay to the vacated Senate seat (a power the Governor did not legally have until the ratification of the 17th Amendment to the U.S. Constitution in 1913). The Senate refused to recognize Quay's appointment, and the seat remained vacant until a Senator could be officially elected (which would ultimately be Quay himself, after a nearly two-year hiatus). This incident, among others, would later be cited by supporters of the 17th Amendment, which mandated the direct election of U.S. Senators.

== Results ==
The Pennsylvania General Assembly convened on January 15, 1901, for a special election to elect a senator to serve out the remainder of the term that began on March 4, 1899. The results of the vote of both houses combined are as follows:

State legislature results
| Party | Candidate | Votes | % |
|---|---|---|---|
| Republican | Matthew Quay | 130 | 51.18 |
| Democratic | James M. Guffey | 56 | 22.05 |
| Republican | John Dalzell | 34 | 13.39 |
| Republican | Charles E. Smith | 12 | 4.72 |
| Republican | George Franklin Huff | 7 | 2.76 |
| Republican | John Stewart | 3 | 1.18 |
| Socialist | John H. Harris | 1 | 0.39 |
| Republican | William McConway | 1 | 0.39 |
| Republican | Henry C. McCormick | 1 | 0.39 |
| Republican | Marlin Olmsted | 1 | 0.39 |
| Prohibition | Silas C. Swallow | 1 | 0.39 |
| Republican | Charles Tubbs | 1 | 0.39 |
| N/A | Not voting | 6 | 2.36 |
| Totals | | 254 | 100.00% |

== See also ==
- 1900–01 United States Senate elections

| Preceded by 1899 | Pennsylvania U.S. Senate election (Class I); 1901 | Succeeded by 1905 |
