= Senator Robertson =

Senator Robertson may refer to:

== Members of the United States Senate ==
- Absalom Willis Robertson (1887–1971), U.S. Senator from Virginia from 1946 to 1966; also served in the Virginia State Senate
- Edward V. Robertson (1881–1963), U.S. Senator from Wyoming from 1943 to 1949
- Thomas J. Robertson (1823–1897), U.S. Senator from South Carolina from 1868 to 1877

== United States state senate members ==
- David B. Robertson (fl. 1990s–2010s), Michigan State Senate
- George W. Robertson (1838–1906), New York State Senate
- Hezekiah D. Robertson (1826–1870), New York State Senate
- Jerome B. Robertson (1815–1890), Texas State Senate
- John Brownlee Robertson (1809–1892), Connecticut State Senate
- John Robertson (congressman) (1787–1873), Virginia State Senate
- William A. Robertson (1837–1889), Louisiana State Senate
- William H. Robertson (1823–1898), New York State Senate
