= Houses at 2501–2531 Charles Street =

Historic houses in Pennsylvania, United States

- U.S. National Register of Historic Places
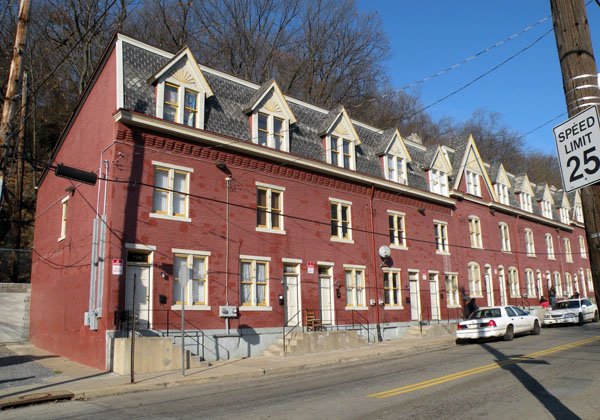

- Location within Pittsburgh Location within Pennsylvania Location within the United States
- Location: 2501–2531 North Charles Street, Pittsburgh, Pennsylvania
- Coordinates: 40°28′1.6″N 80°1′6.73″W
- Built: 1885
- Architect: William A. Stone
- NRHP reference No.: 84003084
- Added to NRHP: March 15, 1984

The houses at 2501–2531 Charles Street, which are located in the Perry South neighborhood of Pittsburgh, Pennsylvania, USA, were built in 1885.

== History and architectural features ==
This row of homes originally included twenty-five nearly identical houses, which were thirteen feet wide and thirty-five feet deep. All but two of the buildings survive. They each have two rooms on the first floor, a parlor and a kitchen, and two bedrooms on the second floor. A third bedroom comprises the third floor behind the mansard roof. The houses rise gradually with the street, stepping up about two feet every fifth house. Every fifth house also has a large decorative gable over the mansard roof.

These row houses were built by William A. Stone, who later became governor of Pennsylvania. In 1887 Stone built a similar set of rowhouses on Brightridge Street. The Charles Street row was added to the National Register of Historic Places on March 15, 1984.
