= Houses at 838–862 Brightridge Street =

Historic houses in Pennsylvania, United States

- U.S. National Register of Historic Places
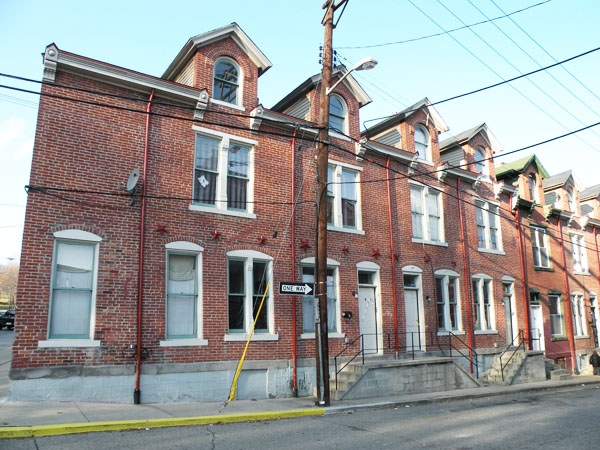

- Location within Pittsburgh Location within Pennsylvania Location within the United States
- Location: 838–862 Brightridge Street, Pittsburgh, Pennsylvania
- Coordinates: 40°27′42.2″N 80°1′7.83″W
- Built: 1887
- Architect: William A. Stone
- NRHP reference No.: 84003081
- Added to NRHP: March 1, 1984

The houses at 838–862 Brightridge Street which are located in the Perry South neighborhood of Pittsburgh, Pennsylvania, USA, were built in 1887 on both sides of what was then called Brighton Place.

== History and architectural features ==
Twelve houses were built on the north side of the street and thirteen were built on the south side. They are of similar size and floor plan to the row houses on Charles Street that were also built by William A. Stone, who later became governor of Pennsylvania. The Brightridge Street row houses were listed on the National Register of Historic Places on March 1, 1984.
