= Allen F. Cooper =

American politician (1862–1917)

Allen Foster Cooper
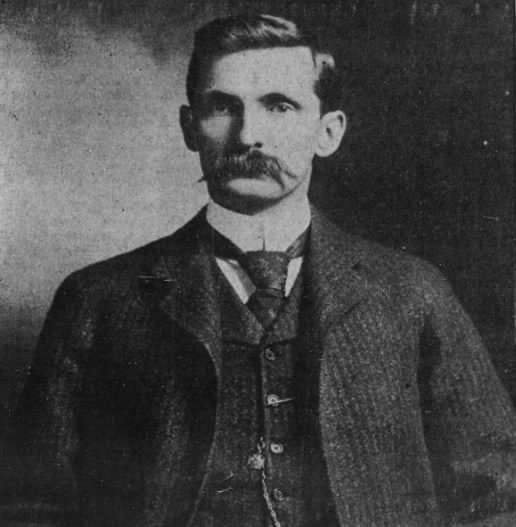
- Myersdale Republican (Myersdale, Pennsylvania), September 25, 1902

Member of the U.S. House of Representatives from Pennsylvania's 23rd district
- In office March 4, 1903 – March 3, 1911
- Preceded by: William H. Graham
- Succeeded by: Thomas S. Crago

Personal details
- Born: June 16, 1862 Franklin Township, Pennsylvania, U.S.
- Died: April 20, 1917 (aged 54)
- Party: Republican
- Education: Mount Union College; University of Michigan Law School

Allen Foster Cooper (June 16, 1862 – April 20, 1917) was a Republican member of the U.S. House of Representatives from Pennsylvania.

Allen Foster Cooper was born in Franklin Township, Fayette County, Pennsylvania. He graduated from the State Normal School in California, Pennsylvania in 1881. He attended Mount Union College in Alliance, Ohio, in 1883. After this he taught for six years in public schools.

Cooper graduated from the law department of the University of Michigan at Ann Arbor, Michigan in 1888. He was admitted to the bar in 1888, and commenced practice in Uniontown, Pennsylvania.

Cooper was elected as a Republican to the Fifty-eighth and to the three succeeding Congresses. After his time in Congress, he resumed business and the practice of law in Uniontown.

U.S. House of Representatives
Preceded by William H. Graham	Member of the U.S. House of Representatives from Pennsylvania's 23rd congressional district 1903–1911	Succeeded by Thomas S. Crago
