= Cornelius Mortimer Treat =

American politician

Cornelius Mortimer Treat (April 25, 1817 – July 28, 1916) was an American teacher, farmer, and politician.

Born in Angelica, New York, Treat moved with his mother to Monroe County, New York in 1820. In 1836, Treat and his mother then moved to New London, Ohio and settled on a farm. During the winter Treat would teach school. In 1847, Treat, his mother and family moved to Rock County, Wisconsin and settled on a farm in the town of Turtle. Treat hauled goods between Janesville, Wisconsin and Belvidere, Illinois; he also leased and ran a hotel in Belvidere, Illinois. He served as town superintendent of schools and as county superintendent of schools. In 1863, Treat served in the Wisconsin State Assembly and was an independent. In 1868, Treat moved to Clinton, Wisconsin and was in the fire insurance business. Treat died at his home in Clinton, Wisconsin.
