= William H. Graham (politician) =

American politician

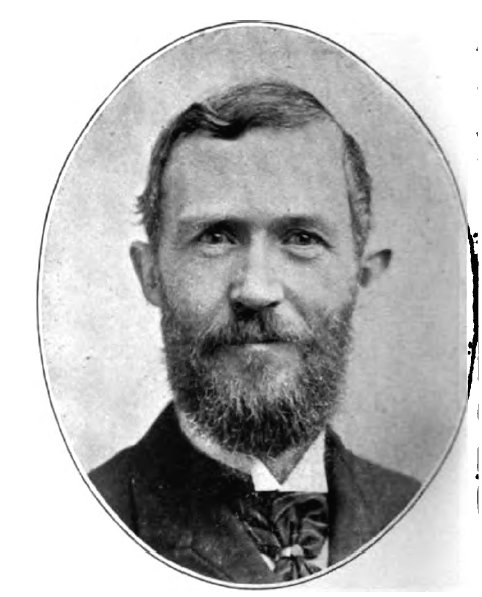

Member of the U.S. House of Representatives from Pennsylvania
- In office March 4, 1905 – March 3, 1911
- Preceded by: George Shiras III
- Succeeded by: Stephen G. Porter
- Constituency: 29th district
- In office November 29, 1898 – March 3, 1903
- Preceded by: William A. Stone
- Succeeded by: Allen Foster Cooper
- Constituency: 23rd district

Member of the Pennsylvania House of Representatives
- In office 1875–1878

Personal details
- Born: August 3, 1844 Allegheny, Pennsylvania, U.S.
- Died: March 2, 1923 (aged 78) Pittsburgh, Pennsylvania, U.S.
- Party: Republican

Military service
- Allegiance: United States
- Branch/service: United States Army
- Battles/wars: American Civil War

William Harrison Graham (August 3, 1844 – March 2, 1923) was a U.S. representative from the Commonwealth of Pennsylvania.

== Biography ==
William H. Graham was born on August 3, 1844, in Allegheny, Pennsylvania (now part of Pittsburgh, Pennsylvania). During the American Civil War, he enlisted on April 5, 1861, in the Second Regiment of the Virginia Infantry of the Union Army.

After a service of two years, the unit was mounted and became the Fifth Regiment of West Virginia Cavalry. He was mustered out on June 14, 1864.

== Post-war life ==
Following his honorable discharge from the military, Graham engaged in the leather business in Allegheny, Pennsylvania. Elected to the Pennsylvania State House of Representatives, he served from 1875 to 1878.

He was then appointed as Recorder of deeds in Allegheny County, Pennsylvania, and served in that capacity from 1882 to 1891. He was also engaged in banking.

Elected as a Republican to the Fifty-fifth Congress to fill the vacancy caused by the resignation of William A. Stone, Graham was reelected to the Fifty-sixth and Fifty-seventh Congresses, but was an unsuccessful candidate for reelection in 1902.

Graham was subsequently elected to the Fifty-ninth, Sixtieth, and Sixty-first Congresses. He served as chairman of the United States House Committee on Ventilation and Acoustics during the Sixtieth Congress, and of the United States House Committee on Expenditures in the Department of Agriculture during the Sixty-first Congress. He was an unsuccessful candidate in the Republican primaries for renomination.

== Later life, death and interment ==
After his time in Congress, Graham served as a member of the Allegheny County Board of Viewers from 1911 to 1923. He died in Pittsburgh in 1923 and was interred in Highwood Cemetery.

U.S. House of Representatives
Preceded by William A. Stone	Member of the U.S. House of Representatives from Pennsylvania's 23rd congressional district 1898–1903	Succeeded by Allen F. Cooper
Preceded by George Shiras III	Member of the U.S. House of Representatives from Pennsylvania's 29th congressional district 1905–1911	Succeeded by Stephen G. Porter
