= George Shiras III =

American politician and photographer (1859–1942)

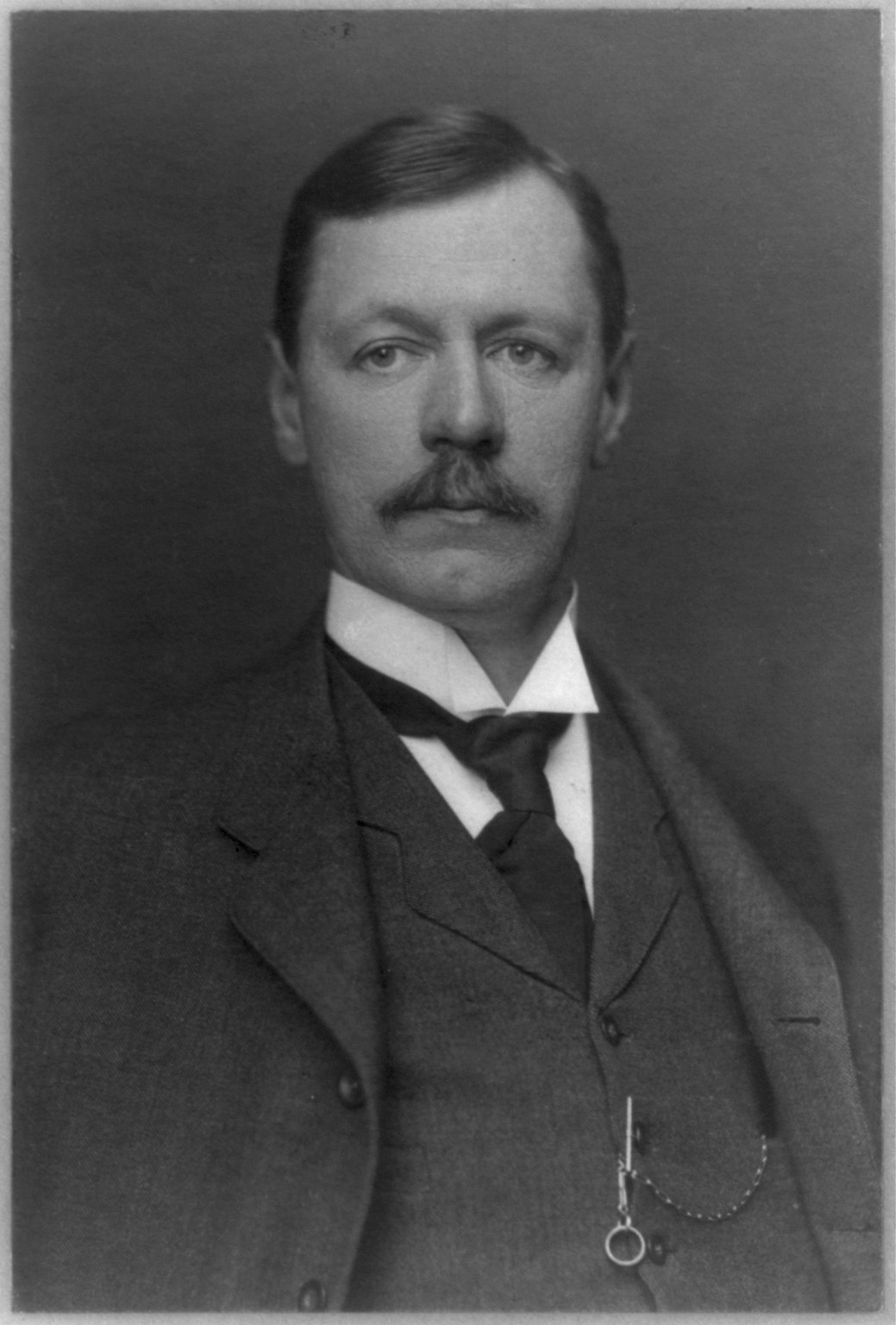
- Shiras in 1904

Member of the U.S. House of Representatives from Pennsylvania's 29th district
- In office March 4, 1903 – March 3, 1905
- Preceded by: district created
- Succeeded by: William Harrison Graham

Personal details
- Born: January 1, 1859 Allegheny, Pennsylvania, U.S.
- Died: March 24, 1942 (aged 83) Marquette, Michigan, U.S.
- Party: Independent Republican
- Parent: George Shiras Jr. (father)
- Education: Cornell University, Yale Law School
- Occupation: photographer, lawyer

George Shiras III (January 1, 1859 – March 24, 1942) was a U.S. representative from the state of Pennsylvania and nature photographer who pioneered the use of nighttime flash photography.

== Biography ==
George Shiras (son of future Supreme Court justice George Shiras Jr.) was born in Allegheny, Pennsylvania. He attended the public schools and Phillips Academy in Andover, Massachusetts. He graduated from Cornell University in Ithaca, New York, in 1881 and from the law department of Yale College in 1883.

He was admitted to the Connecticut and Pennsylvania bars in 1883 and commenced the practice of his profession in Pittsburgh, Pennsylvania.

He served as a member of the Pennsylvania State House of Representatives in 1889 and 1890, but was an unsuccessful candidate for the Republican nomination for Congress in 1890.

Shiras was elected as an Independent Republican to the Fifty-eighth Congress. He did not seek renomination in 1904.

He died in Marquette, Michigan on the March 24, 1942, and was interred at the Park Cemetery.

== Photography ==
Both during and after his time in Congress, Shiras participated in biological research and photography, to the extent that National Geographic has described him as "the father of wildlife photography" for his early use of camera traps and flash photography.

On February 14, 1906, Shiras was elected Associate Member of the Boone and Crockett Club, a conservation organization founded by Theodore Roosevelt in 1887. He was credited with the discovery of a moose subspecies in Yellowstone National Park, which was named Alces alces shirasi, Shiras's Moose.

In 1935, Shiras published Hunting Wild Life with Camera and Flashlight: a Record of Sixty Five years' Visits to the Woods and Waters of North America, a two-volume set of over 960 of his wildlife photographs, including some of the earliest 'flash' photography.

Collections of his papers are held at the National Library of Medicine and the Central Upper Peninsula and Northern Michigan University Archives.

U.S. House of Representatives
Preceded by At-large: Galusha A. Grow, Robert H. Foerderer	Member of the U.S. House of Representatives from Pennsylvania's 29th congressional district 1903–1905	Succeeded by William H. Graham
