= John Bannister (Wisconsin politician) =

19th century American politician

4th Mayor of Beloit, Wisconsin
- In office April 1860 – April 1861
- Preceded by: S. J. Todd
- Succeeded by: Charles H. Parker

Member of the Wisconsin State Assembly
- In office January 6, 1862 – January 5, 1863
- Preceded by: Anson W. Pope
- Succeeded by: C. Mortimer Treat
- Constituency: Rock 4th district
- In office January 6, 1851 – January 5, 1852
- Preceded by: John R. Briggs Jr.
- Succeeded by: John Hackett
- Constituency: Rock 2nd district

Personal details
- Born: September 8, 1808 New York, U.S.
- Died: January 3, 1888 (aged 79) San Diego, California, U.S.
- Resting place: Wellsville Cemetery, Wellsville, Missouri
- Party: Republican; Democratic (before 1854)
- Spouses: Temperance Simmons (m. 1830; died 1876); Sarah (before 1888)
- Children: Drusilla Bannister^{(b. 1832; died 1834)}; Elizabeth Bannister^{(b. 1834)}; Drusilla (Morse)^{(b. 1837; died 1916)}; Virginia Bannister^{(b. 1839; died 1858)}; John Bannister^{(b. 1844; died 1920)}
- Relatives: Henry S. White (nephew)

John Bannister Sr. (September 8, 1808 – January 3, 1888) was an American farmer, politician, and Wisconsin pioneer. He was the 4th mayor of Beloit, Wisconsin, and represented Rock County in the Wisconsin State Assembly during the 1851 and 1862 terms. Originally a Democrat, he became a Republican after that party was established in 1854.

== Biography ==
John Bannister was born in the state of New York, lived for some time in Oneida County, New York, and came to the Wisconsin Territory about 1845, settling in Beloit.

He was first elected to the Wisconsin State Assembly as a Democrat in 1850, representing Rock County's 2nd Assembly district (then comprising the towns of Beloit, Turtle, and Clinton). During that legislative term, he was also one of the founding members of the Wisconsin Agricultural Society.

Bannister became a Republican shortly after that party was created in 1854, and by 1859 was president of the Rock County Republican Club. In that capacity, he hosted Abraham Lincoln to give a speech in Beloit on October 1, 1859, when Lincoln was not yet a candidate for president. Bannister forgot Lincoln's name when introducing him to the crowd.

The next year, Bannister was elected mayor of Beloit, running on the Republican ticket. The following year, after the start of the American Civil War, he won another term in the Assembly, running as a Union Republican candidate in what was then Rock County's 4th Assembly district (the city of Beloit, and the towns of Beloit and Turtle).

== Personal life and family ==
John Bannister married Temperance Simmons in 1830; she was a daughter of Abraham Simmons of Phelps, New York. They had five children, though at least one died in childhood. Their only son, John Jr., served briefly in the 40th Wisconsin Infantry Regiment during the Civil War.

Wisconsin State Assembly
| Preceded by John R. Briggs Jr. | Member of the Wisconsin State Assembly from the Rock 2nd district January 6, 1851 – January 5, 1852 | Succeeded by John Hackett |
| Preceded by Anson W. Pope | Member of the Wisconsin State Assembly from the Rock 4th district January 6, 1862 – January 5, 1863 | Succeeded by C. Mortimer Treat |
Political offices
| Preceded by S. J. Todd | Mayor of Beloit, Wisconsin; April 1860 – April 1861 | Succeeded by Charles H. Parker |
