= George A. Jenks =

American politician

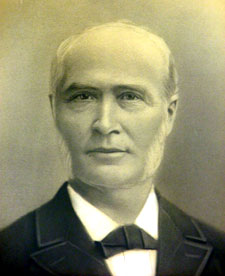

4th Solicitor General of the United States
- In office July 1886 – May 1889
- Appointed by: Grover Cleveland
- Preceded by: John Goode
- Succeeded by: Orlow W. Chapman

Member of the U.S. House of Representatives from Pennsylvania's 25th district
- In office March 4, 1875 – March 3, 1877
- Preceded by: District re-established
- Succeeded by: Harry White

Personal details
- Born: George Augustus Jenks; March 26, 1836 Punxsutawney, Pennsylvania, US
- Died: February 10, 1908 (aged 71) Brookville, Pennsylvania, US
- Education: Jefferson College
- Occupation: U.S. House of Representatives from Pennsylvania's 25th congressional district, United States Solicitor General,

George Augustus Jenks (March 26, 1836 – February 10, 1908) was an American politician from the Commonwealth of Pennsylvania. He served in Congress and as Solicitor General of the United States.

== Early life and education ==
George Jenks was born in Punxsutawney, Pennsylvania, on March 26, 1836. He graduated from Jefferson College (now Washington & Jefferson College) in Canonsburg, Pennsylvania, in 1858. He was a member of Phi Kappa Psi.

== Career ==
Jenks first worked as a lawyer before beginning a career as a judge and politician.

=== Congress ===
Jenks served as a Congressman for Pennsylvania from 1875 to 1877, in the 44th Congress. He served as chairman of the United States House Committee on Invalid Pensions during the Forty-fourth Congress. He was also one of the managers appointed by the House of Representatives in 1876 to conduct the impeachment proceedings against William W. Belknap, ex-Secretary of War.

=== After Congress ===
Following his tenure in Congress, Jenks was nominated by the Democrats for judge of the Supreme Court of Pennsylvania in 1880. He was defeated by Henry Green, of Easton, Pennsylvania. He was later selected as U.S. Assistant Secretary of Interior; a position which he held from 1885 to 1886.

From 1886 to 1889 Jenks served as United States Solicitor General, during President Grover Cleveland’s first term. He was the Democratic nominee for Governor of Pennsylvania in 1898, as well as the Democratic nominee in the 1899 United States Senate election in Pennsylvania, during the Quay deadlock .

== Personal life ==
Jenks married Mary A. Mabon, and they had one daughter, Emma Jenks (1862–1926), who married Benjamin F. Shively.

Jenks's son-in-law (husband of his daughter, Laura) was Benjamin Shively, a U.S. Senator from Indiana.

Jenks died February 10, 1908, at his home in Brookville, Pennsylvania.

== Sources ==
- United States Congress. "George A. Jenks (id: J000091)". Biographical Directory of the United States Congress.
- The Political Graveyard

Party political offices
Preceded by William M. Singerly	Democratic nominee for Governor of Pennsylvania; 1898	Succeeded by Robert E. Pattison
U.S. House of Representatives
Preceded by At-large on a general ticket: Charles Albright, Glenni W. Scofield, Lemuel Todd	Member of the U.S. House of Representatives from Pennsylvania's 25th congressional district 1875–1877	Succeeded by Harry White
Legal offices
Preceded by John Goode	Solicitor General; 1886–1889	Succeeded by Orlow W. Chapman
