= A. Heaton Robertson =

American businessman, judge, lawyer and politician (1850–1924)

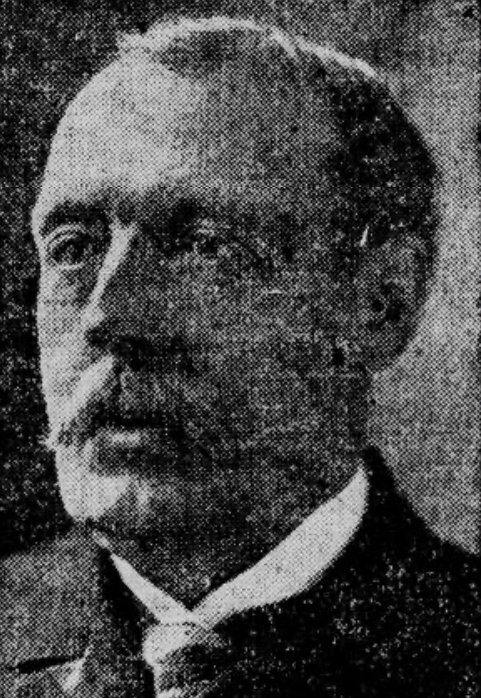
- Robertson in a 1908 publication

Member of the Connecticut House of Representatives
- In office 1880–1882

Member of the Connecticut Senate from the 8th district
- In office 1885–1886

Personal details
- Born: Abram Heaton Robertson; September 24 or September 25, 1850 New Haven, Connecticut, US
- Died: August 6, 1924 (aged 73) Pinehurst, North Carolina, US
- Political party: Democratic
- Relations: John Brownlee Robertson (father)
- Children: 3
- Occupation: Businessman, judge, lawyer, politician

Abram Heaton Robertson (September 24 or 25, 1850 – August 6, 1924) was an American businessman, judge, lawyer, and politician.

== Early life and education ==
Robertson was born on September 24 or 25, 1850, in New Haven, Connecticut, to politician John Brownlee Robertson, and Mabel Maria Heaton. In 1872, he graduated from Yale College, where he was a peer of physicist Edward Bouchet, who possibly worked as an attendant for his father. In 1874, he graduated from Columbia Law School. He received an honorary degree from Trinity College in 1894.

== Career ==
Robertson began practicing law in 1875. As a businessman, he was director of the New York, Ontario and Western Railway, the Harlem River and Port Chester Railroad, and the Southern New England Telephone Company, as well as some banks.

A Democrat, Robertson served in the Connecticut House of Representatives from 1880 to 1882, then in the Connecticut State Senate from the 8th district, from 1885 to 1886. From 1887 to 1895, he served as judge of the New Haven Probate Court. He also unsuccessfully ran in the 1904 Connecticut gubernatorial election, getting 41.5% of the vote and losing to Henry Roberts.

In the 1908 Democratic National Convention, Robertson was unanimously nominated to run on the Democratic ticket in the 1908 Connecticut gubernatorial election. He got 43.5% of the vote and lost to George L. Lilley. Also in 1908, he unsuccessfully ran for the Connecticut House of Representatives, getting one vote.

Robertson also unsuccessfully ran in the 1905 and the 1909 United States Senate election in Connecticut. In the 1909 election, the Assembly chose Morgan Bulkeley instead of him. In his campaigns, he appealed to the working class, calling himself 'Mr. Workingman' in newspaper advertisements.

== Personal life and death ==
Robertson was a member of the University Club of New York, among other clubs. He married Graziella Ridgway; they had three children together. He died on August 6, 1924, aged 73, near Pinehurst, North Carolina, of an illness he contracted while travelling to visit his brother, J. Brownlee Robertson Jr.
