= 1905 United States Senate election in Massachusetts =

- January 1905

270 members of the Massachusetts General Court 136 votes needed to win
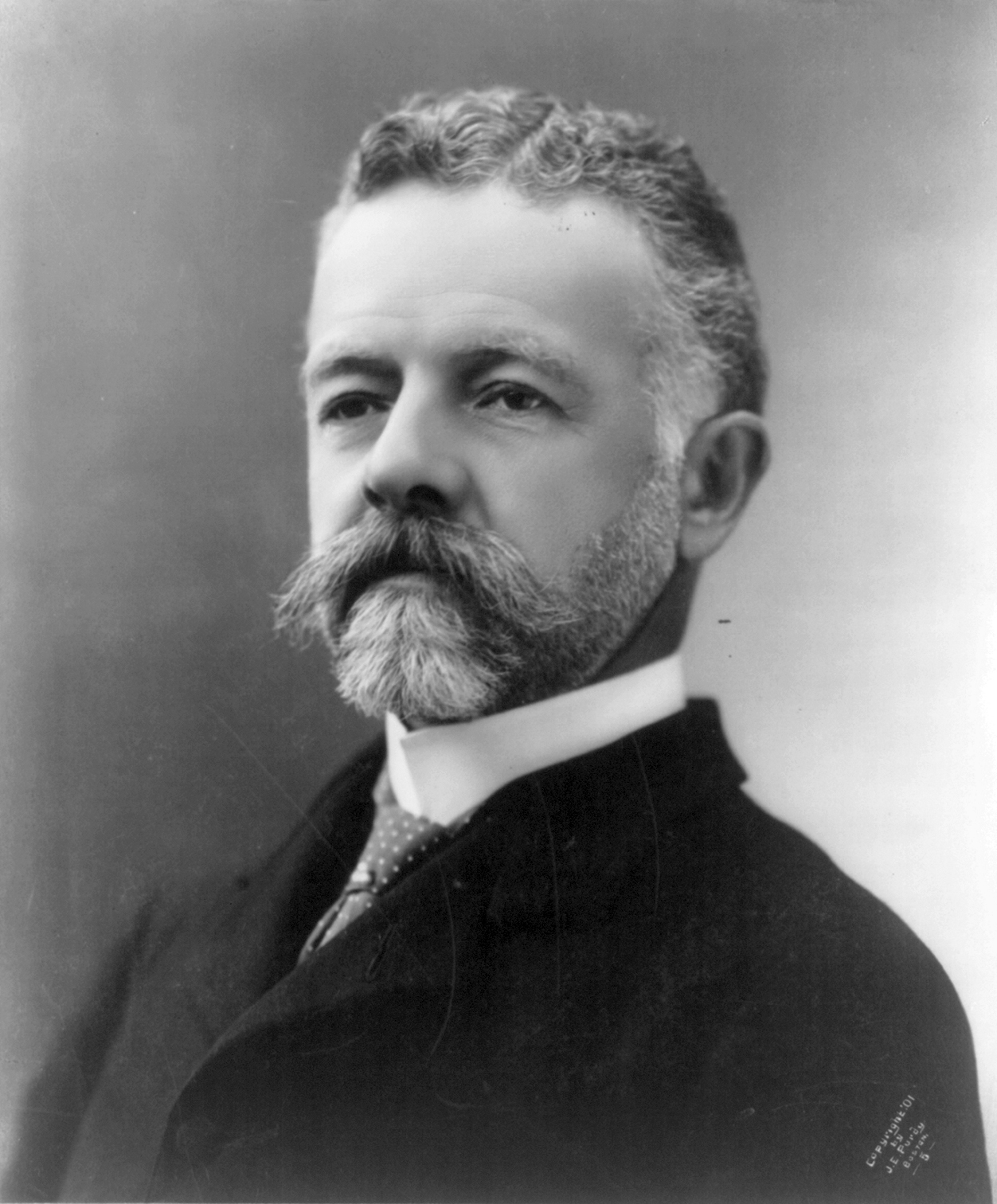

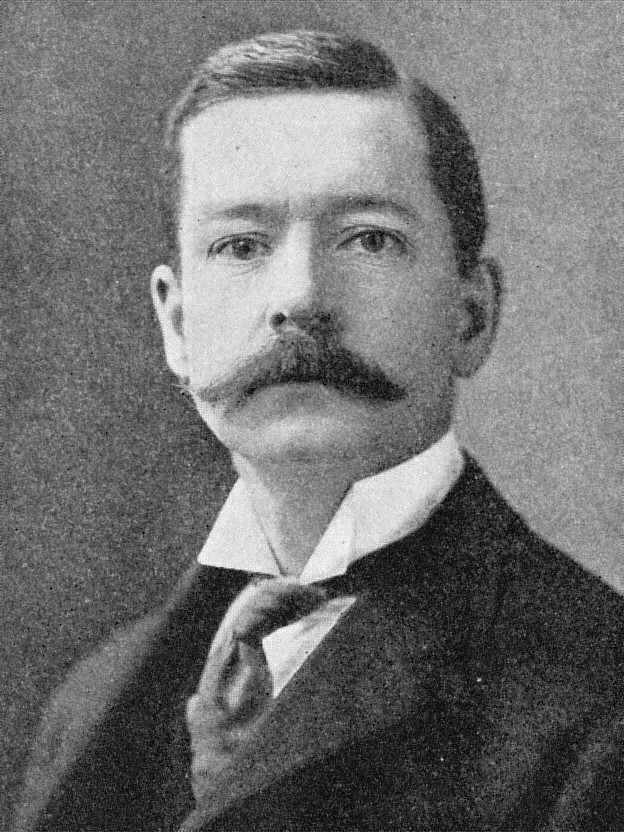
Nominee	Henry Cabot Lodge	William A. Gaston
Party	Republican	Democratic
Electoral vote	198	72
Percentage	73.33%	26.67%
Senator before election
Henry Cabot Lodge
Republican
Elected Senator
Henry Cabot Lodge
Republican

The 1905 United States Senate election in Massachusetts was held during January 1905. Republican incumbent Henry Cabot Lodge won election to a third term.

At the time, Massachusetts elected United States senators by a majority vote of the combined houses of the Massachusetts General Court.

== Background ==
In the 1904 legislative elections, Republicans maintained an overwhelming majority. The Senators-elect included 34 Republicans and just six Democrats, and the Representatives-elect included 164 Republicans and 66 Democrats.

== Nominating caucuses ==
Lodge faced no opposition for the Republican nomination. At the caucus on January 12, his name was placed into nomination by Senate President William F. Dana, and seconding speeches were made by Speaker of the House William F. Frothingham and Representative William Salter.

== Results ==
Lodge was re-elected on a party-line vote.

1905 United States Senate election in Massachusetts
Party	Candidate	Votes	%
Republican	Henry Cabot Lodge (incumbent)	198	73.33%
Democratic	William A. Gaston	72	26.67%
Total votes		270	100.00%
