= John Hammond (Wisconsin politician) =

American politician (1814–1898)

John Hammond (June 14, 1814 – August 31, 1898) was an American politician and farmer. He served in the Wisconsin State Assembly. Hammond was from Turtle, Wisconsin. He died in Clinton, Wisconsin on the night of August 31, 1898, at the age of 84. His obituary stated that he had been an invalid at the time of his death, having been "overheated by the sun" 12 years prior.
