= Turtle, Wisconsin =

Town of Turtle
- Town
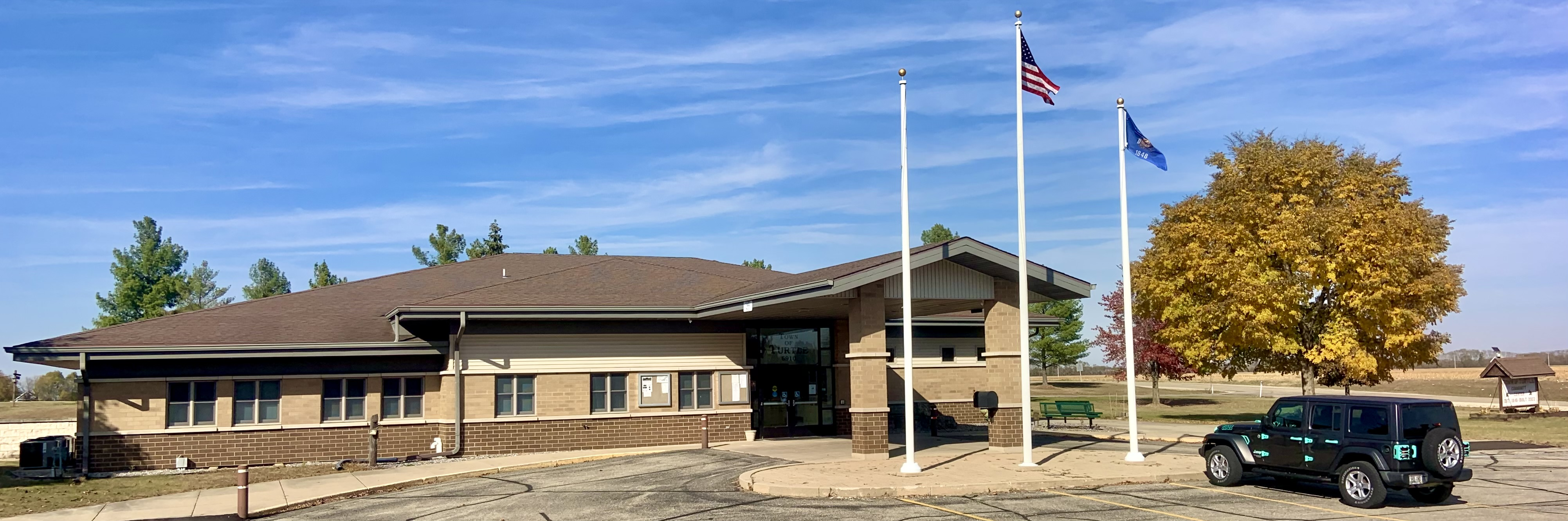
- Town hall

- Location of the Town of Turtle in Rock County and the state of Wisconsin.
- Coordinates: 42°32′21″N 88°58′13″W
- Country: United States
- State: Wisconsin
- County: Rock

Area
  - Total: 29.3 sq mi (76.0 km^{2})
  - Land: 29.3 sq mi (76.0 km^{2})
  - Water: 0 sq mi (0.0 km^{2})
- Elevation: 896 ft (273 m)

Population (2020)
  - Total: 2,393
  - Density: 83/sq mi (32.2/km^{2})
- Time zone: UTC-6 (Central (CST))
  - Summer (DST): UTC-5 (CDT)
- Area code: 608
- FIPS code: 55-81050
- GNIS feature ID: 1584301
- Website: www.townofturtlewi.gov

The Town of Turtle is located in Rock County, Wisconsin, United States. The population was 2,393 at the 2020 census. The city of Beloit borders the town. The unincorporated communities of Foxhollow, Porters, and Shopiere are located in the town. The unincorporated community of Tiffany is also located partially within the town.

== Geography ==
According to the United States Census Bureau, the town has a total area of 29.3 square miles (76.0 km^{2}), all land.

== Demographics ==
As of the census of 2000, there were 2,444 people, 957 households, and 728 families residing in the town. The population density was 83.3 people per square mile (32.2/km^{2}). There were 990 housing units at an average density of 33.8 per square mile (13.0/km^{2}). The racial makeup of the town was 97.26% White, 1.47% African American, 0.33% Native American, 0.25% Asian, 0.45% from other races, and 0.25% from two or more races. Hispanic or Latino of any race were 1.02% of the population.

There were 957 households, out of which 29.0% had children under the age of 18 living with them, 66.0% were married couples living together, 5.7% had a female householder with no husband present, and 23.9% were non-families. 19.9% of all households were made up of individuals, and 10.1% had someone living alone who was 65 years of age or older. The average household size was 2.55 and the average family size was 2.93.

In the town, the population was spread out, with 23.6% under the age of 18, 5.6% from 18 to 24, 25.7% from 25 to 44, 31.7% from 45 to 64, and 13.4% who were 65 years of age or older. The median age was 42 years. For every 100 females, there were 102.8 males. For every 100 females age 18 and over, there were 102.6 males.

The median income for a household in the town was $57,188, and the median income for a family was $63,293. Males had a median income of $41,500 versus $24,286 for females. The per capita income for the town was $24,015. About 1.0% of families and 2.7% of the population were below the poverty line, including 0.6% of those under age 18 and 4.3% of those age 65 or over.

== Transportation ==
The southwest corner of the town of Turtle is served by routes 3 and 5 of Beloit Transit.

== Notable people ==
- Samuel Colley, farmer, Free Soil and later Republican member of the Wisconsin State Assembly, and county sheriff
- Charles H. Everett, Republican member of the State Assembly and the Wisconsin State Senate
- John Hammond, farmer and Republican member of the State Assembly
- Cornelius Mortimer Treat, member of the Wisconsin State Assembly and farmer
