= 1898 Pennsylvania gubernatorial election =

- November 8, 1898
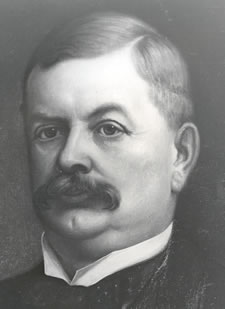

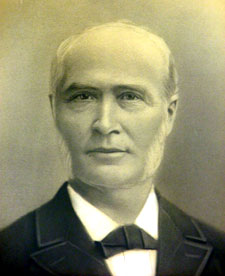

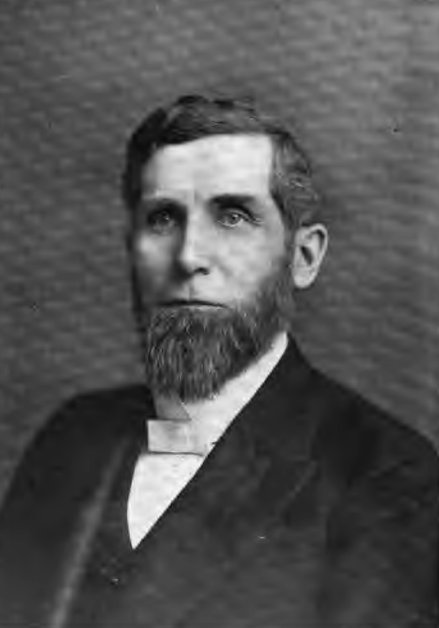
Nominee	William A. Stone	George A. Jenks	Silas C. Swallow
Party	Republican	Democratic	Prohibition
Popular vote	476,206	358,300	132,931
Percentage	49.01%	36.87%	13.68%
- County results Stone: 30–40% 40–50% 50–60% 60–70% Jenks: 40–50% 50–60% 60–70% Swallow: 30–40%
Governor before election
Daniel H. Hastings
Republican
Elected Governor
William A. Stone
Republican

The 1898 Pennsylvania gubernatorial election was held on November 8, 1898. It featured a three-way campaign between major party candidates William Stone and George Jenks, as well as a strong showing by prohibitionist Silas Swallow.

== Candidates ==
=== Prohibition ===
- Silas C. Swallow, minister and Prohibition activist (from Dauphin County)

=== Democratic ===
- George A. Jenks, former United States Solicitor General (from Jefferson County)
- Alexander Hamilton Coffroth, former U.S. Congressman

=== Republican ===
- William A. Stone, U.S. Congressman (from Allegheny County)
- Charles Warren Stone, U.S. Congressman (from Warren County)

== Campaign ==
Entering the election, the Republican machine was strong but its leadership was divided. Although previous governor Daniel Hastings had tried to toe the line between the conservative and progressive wings of the party, he failed to impress either side. Former Auditor General David McMurtrie Gregg was seen as a potential compromise candidate due to his reputation from serving in the American Civil War, but he declined to seek the nomination. Party bosses Matthew Quay, a conservative, and John Wanamaker, a progressive, nominated candidates with the same last name but who were of no relation. In a close race, the conservatives prevailed, but the party had difficulty reuniting after William Stone defeated retired U.S. Army Colonel Charles W. Stone.

Jenks' campaign had difficulty gaining traction from the start, and Stone was able to undercut some of Swallow's support by identifying with the temperance movement. Stone also did well by emphasizing his commitment to law and order, after labor strife had rocked the state during the previous governor's term.

== Results ==
Pennsylvania gubernatorial election, 1898
Party	Candidate	Votes	%
Republican	William A. Stone	476,206	49.01
Democratic	George A. Jenks	358,300	36.87
Prohibition	Silas C. Swallow	132,931	13.68
Socialist Labor	J. Mahlon Barnes	4,278	0.44
N/A	Other	32	0.00
Total votes		971,747	100.00
