= 1893 United States Senate election in Massachusetts =

- January 17, 1893

280 members of the Massachusetts General Court 141 votes needed to win
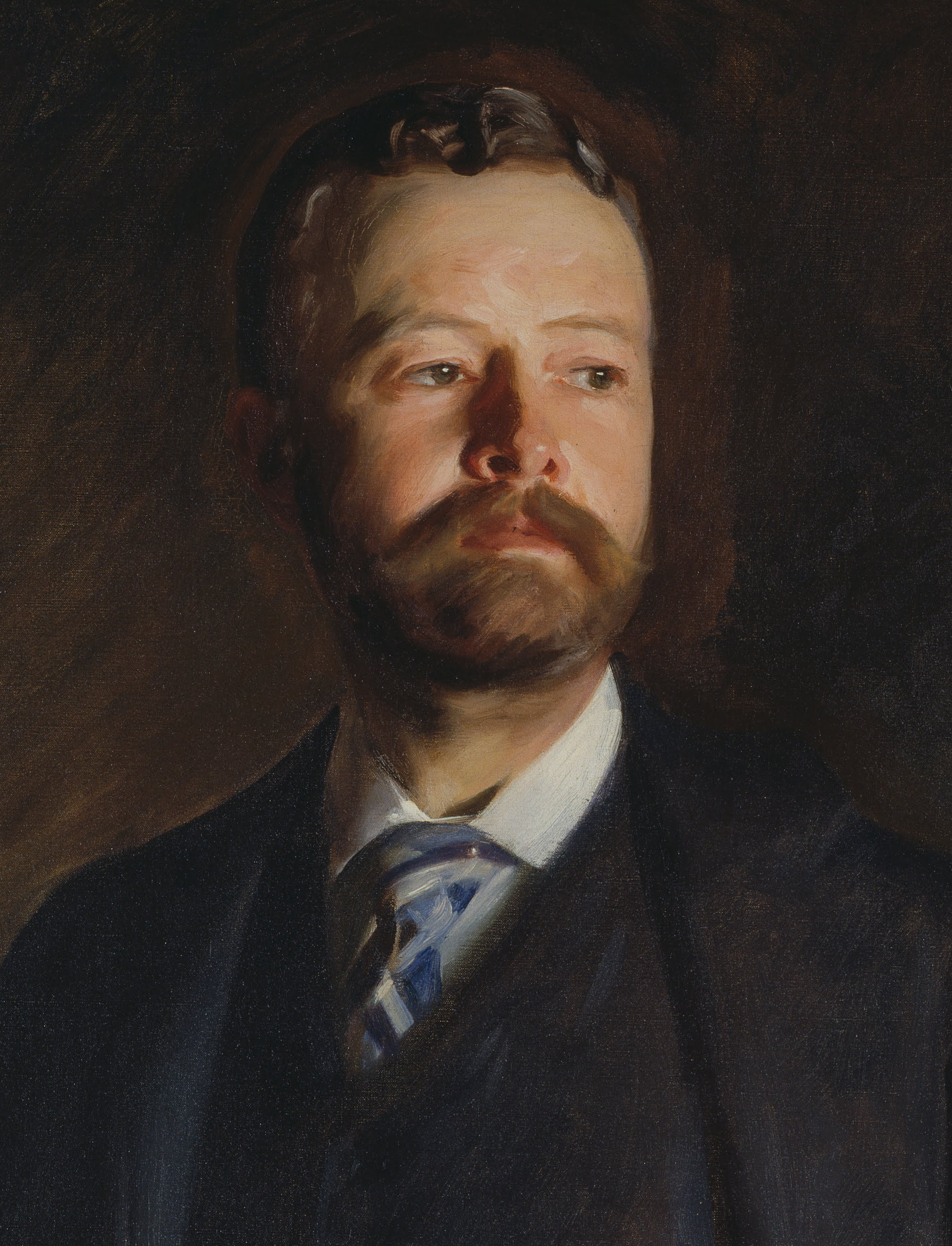

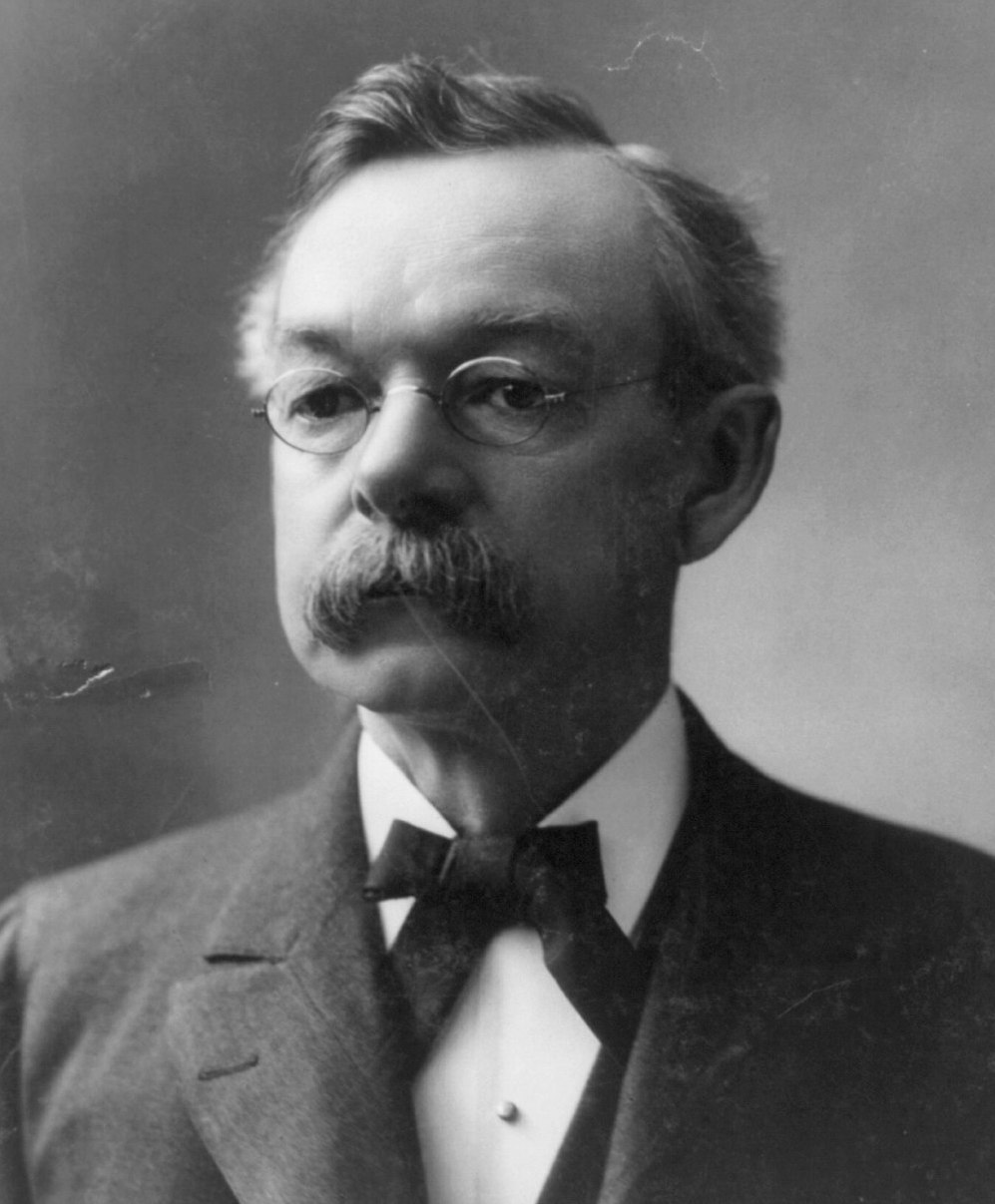
Nominee	Henry Cabot Lodge	Patrick Collins
Party	Republican	Democratic
Electoral vote	190	81
Percentage	67.86%	25.71%
Senator before election
Henry L. Dawes
Republican
Elected Senator
Henry Cabot Lodge
Republican

The 1893 United States Senate election in Massachusetts was held during January 1893. Republican incumbent Henry L. Dawes chose not to seek a fourth term in office, and was replaced by Republican U.S. representative Henry Cabot Lodge.

At the time, Massachusetts elected United States senators by a majority vote of the combined houses of the Massachusetts General Court.

== Background ==
In the 1892 state elections, Republicans won 186 of 280 seats in the legislature.

== Republican nomination ==
=== Candidates ===
- William W. Crapo, U.S. representative from New Bedford
- Henry Cabot Lodge, U.S. representative from Nahant

The primary candidates for the nomination were U.S. representatives Henry Cabot Lodge and William W. Crapo.

=== Caucus ===
On January 4, Republican legislators from both houses met to caucus and determine their nominee. Crapo supporters, led by state senator William M. Butler, attempted to delay the caucus until January 12. A motion to adjourn lost, with 124 votes against to 40 votes in favor. The caucus proceeded to a final ballot, with 94 votes needed for the nomination. Lodge won the ballot easily.

Republican nominating caucus
Party	Candidate	Votes	%
Republican	Henry Cabot Lodge	147	79.03%
Republican	William W. Crapo	30	16.13%
Republican	John Davis Long	5	2.69%
Republican	William Cogswell	2	1.08%
Republican	Frederic T. Greenhalge	2	1.08%
Total votes		186	100.00%

== Results ==
1893 United States Senate election in Massachusetts
Party	Candidate	Votes	%
Republican	Henry Cabot Lodge	190	67.86%
Democratic	Patrick Collins	81	28.93%
None	No vote	9	3.21%
Total votes		280	100.00%
