= Richard Burdge =

American politician

Richard J. Burdge (December 28, 1833 –8 May 1916) was a member of the Wisconsin State Assembly and the Wisconsin State Senate.

== Background ==
Burdge was born on December 28, 1833, in Axbridge, England. Later, he resided in Beloit, Wisconsin.

== Political career ==
Burdge was a member of the Assembly during the 1879 and 1880 sessions. Later, he was a member of the Senate during the 1891 and 1893 sessions, representing the 17th District. Other positions Burdge held include member of the School Board and Mayor of Beloit. He was a Republican.
