= Roger H. Mills =

19th century American politician

20th Secretary of State of Connecticut
- In office June 1849 – June 1850
- Preceded by: John Brownlee Robertson
- Succeeded by: Hiram Weed

6th Mayor of Beloit, Wisconsin
- In office April 1862 – April 1863
- Preceded by: Charles H. Parker
- Succeeded by: Beriah C. Rogers

Member of the Connecticut Senate from the New Hartford district
- In office May 1, 1848 – May 1, 1849

Personal details
- Born: April 18, 1813 New Hartford, Connecticut, U.S.
- Died: November 12, 1881 (aged 68) Beloit, Wisconsin, U.S.
- Resting place: Oakwood Cemetery, Beloit
- Party: Republican; Whig (before 1856)
- Profession: Lawyer

Roger Henry Mills (April 18, 1813 – November 12, 1881) was an American lawyer, politician, and Wisconsin pioneer. He was the 20th Secretary of State of Connecticut and served in the Connecticut House of Representatives and Senate. After moving to Wisconsin, he was elected the 6th mayor of Beloit, Wisconsin.

== Biography ==
Born in New Hartford, Connecticut, son of Roger and Harriet Merrill Mills, Roger Henry Mills went to Yale Law School and was admitted to the Connecticut bar. He practiced law in New Hartford, Connecticut. Mills served in the Connecticut House of Representatives in 1839 and 1840. In 1848, Mills served in the Connecticut State Senate and was a Whig. In 1849, he was elected Secretary of State of Connecticut. He was also probate judge. He later became a Republican. In 1853, Mills moved to Beloit, Wisconsin and continued to practice law. Mills served as mayor of Beloit, Wisconsin. Mills died in Beloit, Wisconsin.

Political offices
Preceded by John B. Robertson	Secretary of the State of Connecticut; 1849–1850	Succeeded by Hiram Weed
Preceded by Charles H. Parker	Mayor of Beloit, Wisconsin; April 1862 – April 1863	Succeeded by Beriah C. Rogers
