= John Brownlee Robertson =

American politician (1809–1892)

John Brownlee Robertson (September 14, 1809 – July 14, 1892) was an American politician.

== Biography ==
Robertson was born on September 14, 1809, in Charleston, South Carolina. He graduated from Yale College in 1829. After graduation, he began the study of medicine with his brother-in-law, Dr. S. H. Dickson, and received the degree of M.D. from the Charleston Medical College in 1832. He had already married in New Haven, in 1830, Mary W., daughter of Abel Denison, and he settled here in business but did not practice his profession. His wife died on February 1, 1835, and in 1838, he married Mabel Maria Heaton. In 1837 and 1838, he was a member of the Common Council, and in 1840 he was sent to the Connecticut General Assembly, but declined a re-nomination in 1842. In 1846, he was a member of the Connecticut Senate, and for the two succeeding years he was secretary of state of Connecticut. He was then made postmaster of New Haven and served until 1853. Until about this date he was engaged in the business of carpet-manufacture. He was also, until his retirement in 1870, secretary of the American Mutual Life Insurance Company. In 1867 and 1868, he served as alderman of the city, and in 1881 and 1882 as mayor of New Haven. At the time of his death, as for many years previous, he was junior warden of Trinity Church. He died on July 14, 1892, aged 83, in New Haven. He is buried in Grove Street Cemetery. His son was politician A. Heaton Robertson.

This article incorporates public domain material from the 1893 Yale Obituary Record.

Political offices
| Preceded by Charles W. Bradley | Secretary of the State of Connecticut; 1847–1849 | Succeeded by Roger H. Mills |
