= 1887 United States Senate election in Pennsylvania =

The 1887 United States Senate election in Pennsylvania was held on January 18, 1887. Matthew Quay was elected by the Pennsylvania General Assembly to the United States Senate.

== Results ==
The Pennsylvania General Assembly, consisting of the House of Representatives and Senate, convened on January 18, 1887, to elect a senator to serve the term beginning on March 4, 1887. The results of the vote of both houses are as follows:

State legislature results
Party	Candidate	Votes	%
Republican	Matthew Quay	165	65.74
Democratic	Simon P. Wolverton	80	31.87
N/A	Not voting	6	2.39
Totals		251	100.00%

== See also ==
- 1886–87 United States Senate elections

Preceded by 1881	Pennsylvania U.S. Senate election (Class I); 1887	Succeeded by 1893
