= Sereno Merrill =

American politician

Sereno Merrill (born September 24, 1816, in Gill, Massachusetts) was an American politician who served as a member of the Wisconsin State Assembly during the 1876 and 1877 sessions. Additionally, he was a member of the Rock County, Wisconsin Board of Supervisors. He was a Republican.
