= 1893 United States Senate election in Pennsylvania =

The 1893 United States Senate election in Pennsylvania was held on January 17, 1893. Incumbent Matthew Quay was re-elected by the Pennsylvania General Assembly to the United States Senate.

== Results ==
The Pennsylvania General Assembly, consisting of the House of Representatives and the Senate, convened on January 17, 1893, to elect a senator to serve the term beginning on March 4, 1893. The results of the vote of both houses combined are as follows:

State legislature results
Party	Candidate	Votes	%
Republican	Matthew Quay (Inc.)	165	64.96
Democratic	George Ross	80	31.50
Republican	John Dalzell	1	0.39
Democratic	William F. Harrity	1	0.39
Democratic	William Mutchler	1	0.39
N/A	Not voting	6	2.36
Totals		254	100.00%

== See also ==
- 1892–93 United States Senate elections

Preceded by 1887	Pennsylvania U.S. Senate election (Class I); 1893	Succeeded by 1899
