= William A. Stone =

American politician (1846–1920)

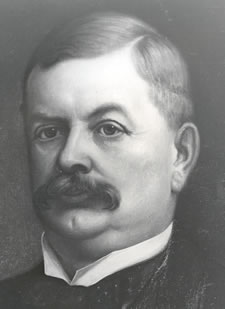

22nd Governor of Pennsylvania
- In office January 17, 1899 – January 20, 1903
- Lieutenant: John P. S. Gobin
- Preceded by: Daniel H. Hastings
- Succeeded by: Samuel W. Pennypacker

Member of the U.S. House of Representatives from Pennsylvania's 23rd district
- In office March 4, 1891 – November 9, 1898
- Preceded by: Thomas McKee Bayne
- Succeeded by: William Harrison Graham

Personal details
- Born: April 18, 1846 Wellsboro, Pennsylvania, U.S.
- Died: March 1, 1920 (aged 73) Pittsburgh, Pennsylvania, U.S.
- Party: Republican
- Spouse(s): Ellen F. Stevens (1870–1878; her death); Elizabeth B. White (1879–1919; her death)
- Children: 4

William Alexis Stone (April 18, 1846 – March 1, 1920) was an American politician who served as the 22nd governor of Pennsylvania, serving from 1899 to 1903.

== Early life and family ==
Stone was born in Wellsboro, Pennsylvania. In 1864, Stone enlisted in the Union Army as a private during the American Civil War, and became a second lieutenant in 1865. He continued his military service after the war in the Pennsylvania National Guard. He attended Mansfield State Normal School and taught while studying law.

The eldest daughter by his first wife married Dr. Percy D. Hickling, a prominent physician in Washington, D.C. Dr. Hickling was on the Committee of President Cleveland's Inaugural Ball. They were both members of the Shakespeare Club of Washington of which Dr. Hickling was also President.

Col. William A. Stone's wife was the youngest daughter of Judge R.C. White, of Wellsboro, Ohio. She was connected with one of the oldest and best of Pennsylvania's families. Benjamin Franklin's daughter married into the Bach family, of which her mother was descended, and her mother was a cousin of Dr. William Carpenter and Dr. Mary Carpenter, of London, who, with the Princess Alice, established a Mission School in India. Elizabeth White Stone was born in Tioga County. She attended school in New York City, where she was graduated at a musical academy. They had 4 children, 3 daughters and 1 son.

== Appointments ==
In 1872, he was appointed as a clerk for the Pennsylvania State House of Representatives. Two years later, he ran for his first political office, becoming district attorney of Tioga County. In 1876, he was appointed district attorney for the U.S. District Court for the Western District of Pennsylvania by President Rutherford B. Hayes. He held that post until 1886 when he violated President Chester A. Arthur's edict for political office-holders not to campaign for political candidates. Stone campaigned for James A. Beaver, and his removal only increased his popularity.

== Congress and Pennsylvania Governorship ==
Stone served four terms in the United States House of Representatives before running for governor in 1898. During his term in office, Pennsylvania's state debt was eliminated, and a new capitol building was commissioned. After serving as governor, Stone joined his son in private law practice in Pittsburgh, Pennsylvania. He also served briefly as prothonotary for the Pennsylvania Supreme Court in 1915. He died on March 1 1920 at 73 years old.

== In Memoriam ==
Stone Hall, a residence hall on Penn State's University Park campus is named for Stone.

U.S. House of Representatives
Preceded by Thomas McKee Bayne	Member of the U.S. House of Representatives from Pennsylvania's 23rd congressional district 1891–1898	Succeeded by William Harrison Graham
Political offices
Preceded by Daniel H. Hastings	Governor of Pennsylvania; 1899–1903	Succeeded by Samuel W. Pennypacker
Party political offices
Preceded by Daniel H. Hastings	Republican nominee for Governor of Pennsylvania; 1898	Succeeded by Samuel W. Pennypacker
