= Platt machine =

- Leader: • Thomas C. Platt • Benjamin B. Odell Jr. • Theodore Roosevelt
- Dissolved: 1903
- Political position: Big tent
- National affiliation: Republican Party

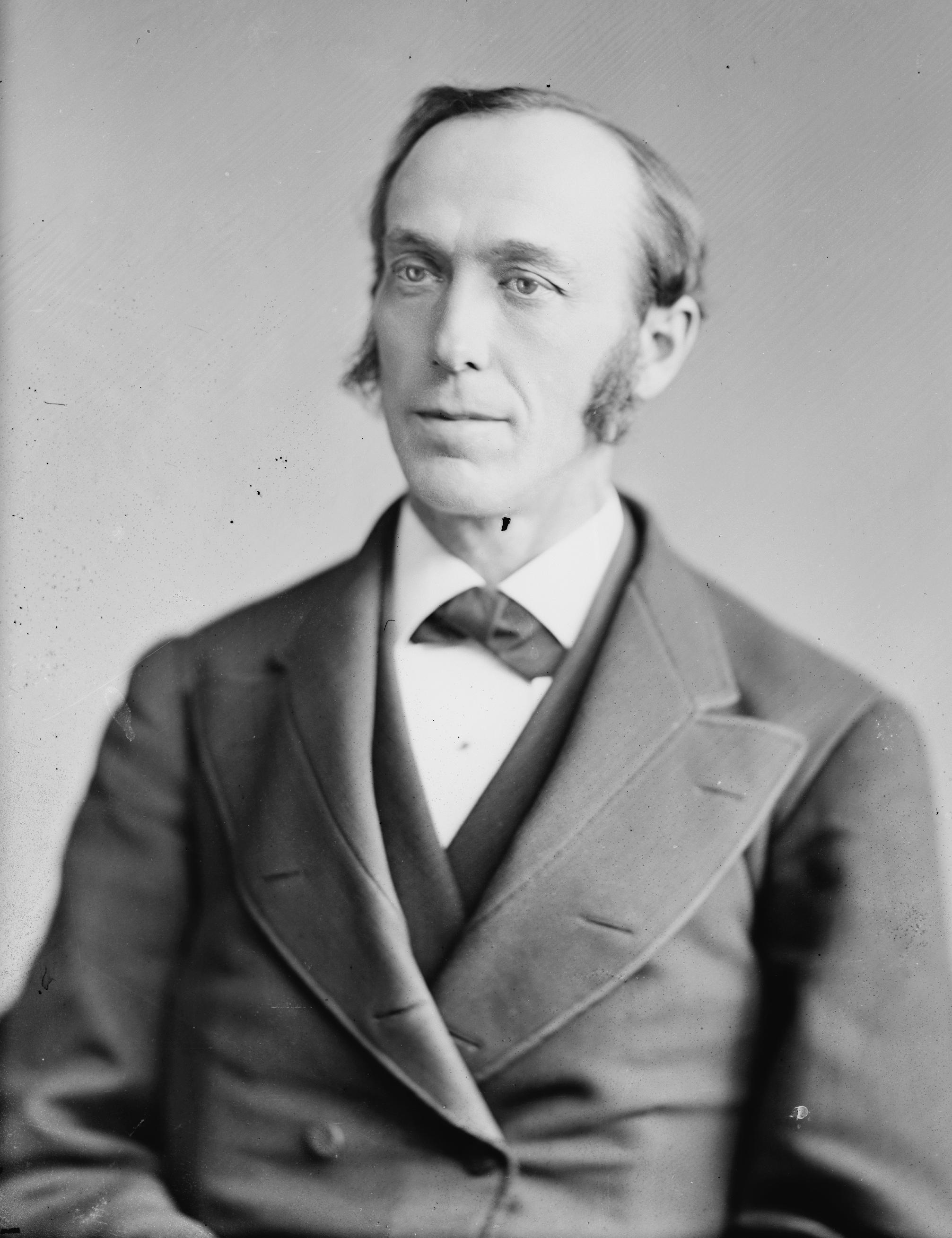
Portrait of Thomas C. "Tom" Platt.

The Platt machine was a United States political organization and coalition of Republican Party members in New York which exerted heavy influence over the state's politics during the Gilded Age. The organization's leadership was maintained by U.S. senator T. C. "Tom" Platt, its "easy boss."

Senator Platt, the machine's leader, was conservative though practical, in contrast to his shrewdly partisan mentor Roscoe Conkling. The machine's priority of party unity over a hardline conservative push resulted in its eventual demise at the hands of intraparty progressive forces led by Benjamin B. Odell Jr., and Theodore Roosevelt. By 1903, the machine was "smashed" at the hands of Odell.

In spite of the general corruption associated with political machines, Sen. Platt was considered to have a largely clean record, never financially profiting from political dealings. However, the machine failed to fully root out bribery practices, and its influence by financial interests, among several factors, would result in assails against machine politics following Platt's death in 1910.

== Background ==
Platt's familiarity with machine politics were shaped in his earlier career, during which he carefully studied the tactics employed by Thurlow Weed, Reuben Fenton, and Roscoe Conkling. Among the details he absorbed pertained to:

- party management
- rewarding loyalists and punishing "traitors"
- the collection of campaign funds
- increasing voter turnout

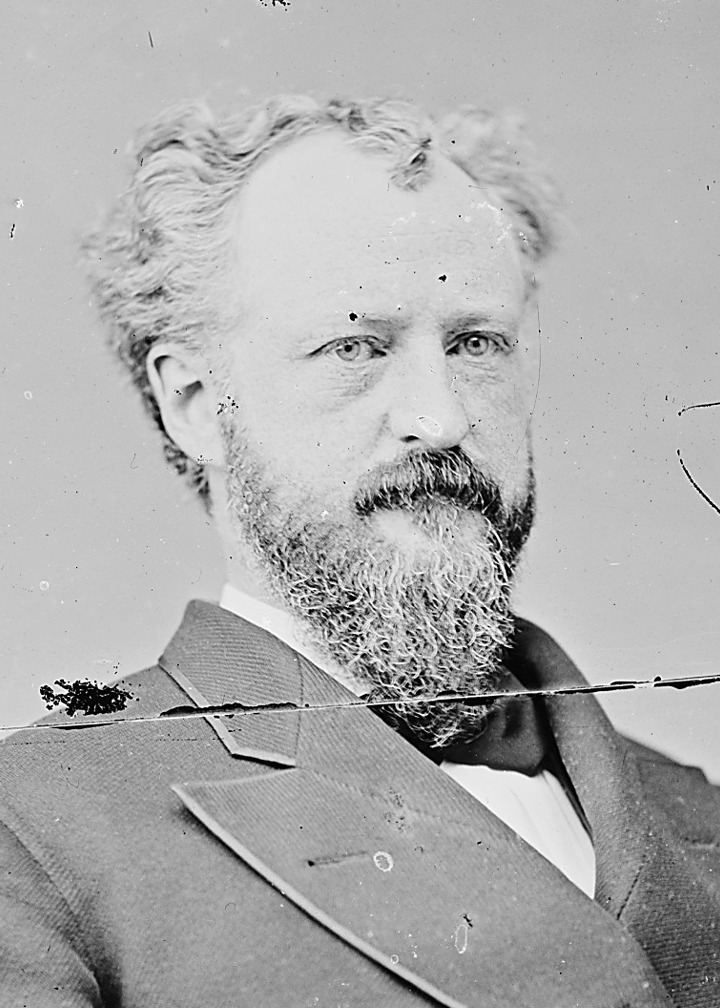
Senator Roscoe Conkling, who propelled Platt's career.

The rise of Platt's political career was largely fueled by Conkling. During the 1870s, Conkling sparred with Fenton over control of the state's Republican Party politics, and Platt consistently aided the former's causes. During each convention, Platt marshaled "Southern Tier" aid that contributed to Conkling's eventual triumph over Fenton. During his second term in the U.S. House of Representatives, Platt led the movement in the 1876 United States presidential election to nominate Conkling for the party ticket. A grateful Conkling subsequently appointed Platt to lead the Republican State Committee.

In the 1880 United States presidential election, Platt aided efforts led by Conkling, John A. Logan, and J. Donald Cameron (leaders of the "Stalwarts," who Platt was among) to nominate former president Ulysses S. Grant for an unprecedented third term. When a maneuver by "Half-Breeds" and the Blaine faction thwarted the Stalwarts to nominate dark horse candidate James A. Garfield, Platt demonstrated support for party unity by campaigning for Garfield. This earned him support from Chauncey M. Depew, who would later exercise an important role associated with the politics of the Platt machine.

Platt was elected to the United States Senate in 1881 to serve alongside Conkling, although this tenure would prove to be brief. Garfield, at the advice of James G. Blaine, alienated "Stalwarts" by nominating Blaine faction leader-turned-"Half-Breed" William H. Robertson to the position of Collector of the Port of New York. Platt proposed to Conkling that both submit their immediate resignations from the U.S. Senate, presuming that their subsequent immediate elections to their Senate seats by the state legislature in the following special elections would demonstrate a rebuke towards Garfield. However, the "Half-Breed" Republicans in the New York legislature thwarted the pair, electing Warner Miller and Elbridge G. Lapham to the seats instead.

Following the failed effort suggested by Platt that resulted in the self-removal of him and Conkling, their friendship shattered. The lack of Conkling's leadership resulted in a disorientation of the New York GOP for a brief period of time, marked by frequent defeats at elections. Platt, in an effort to improve party performance, would in the subsequent several years wrench for leadership. During the process, he threw support in the 1884 United States presidential election to party nominee James G. Blaine, a longtime personal nemesis of Conkling.

== Timeline ==
=== Rise to power, 1890s ===
In 1893, the New York GOP oversaw electoral victories that would continue for the subsequent sixteen years. This fueled Platt's rise to the role of machine boss, exercising tremendous power over the state's government.

=== Compromises with progressives ===
In 1898, Platt appeased the progressive wing of the New York GOP by successfully pushing to elect Roosevelt governor of the state. The two held a harmonious—though uneasy—relationship. During their alliance in order for the maintenance of the Republican coalition, appointment selections, reform measures, and conversation efforts were enacted.

=== Instituted policies ===
Under Platt's leadership, the overseen policy changes included increased regulations of liquor, the consolidation of Greater New York City, and Erie Canal improvements.

=== The machine's decline: assassination of McKinley, usurpation by Odell ===
The increasing power of Roosevelt resulted in a diminishing of Platt's power. In the 1900 United States presidential election, Platt, along with Pennsylvania U.S. senator M. S. "Matt" Quay, proposed a vice presidential nomination of Roosevelt alongside William McKinley to "shelve" him from direct influence of New York politics.

Following the assassination of McKinley, Roosevelt assumed the presidency, proving Platt's devised plan a disastrous unintended consequence.

Odell's ascendancy to the governorship resulted in an increase of his power and a further decline in Platt's influence. Odell subsequently proved to act with independent leanings against Platt's conservatism. By 1904, when Platt was re-elected to another U.S. Senate term, his powerful influence over the machine evaporated.
