= Eugene Hale =

American politician (1836–1918)

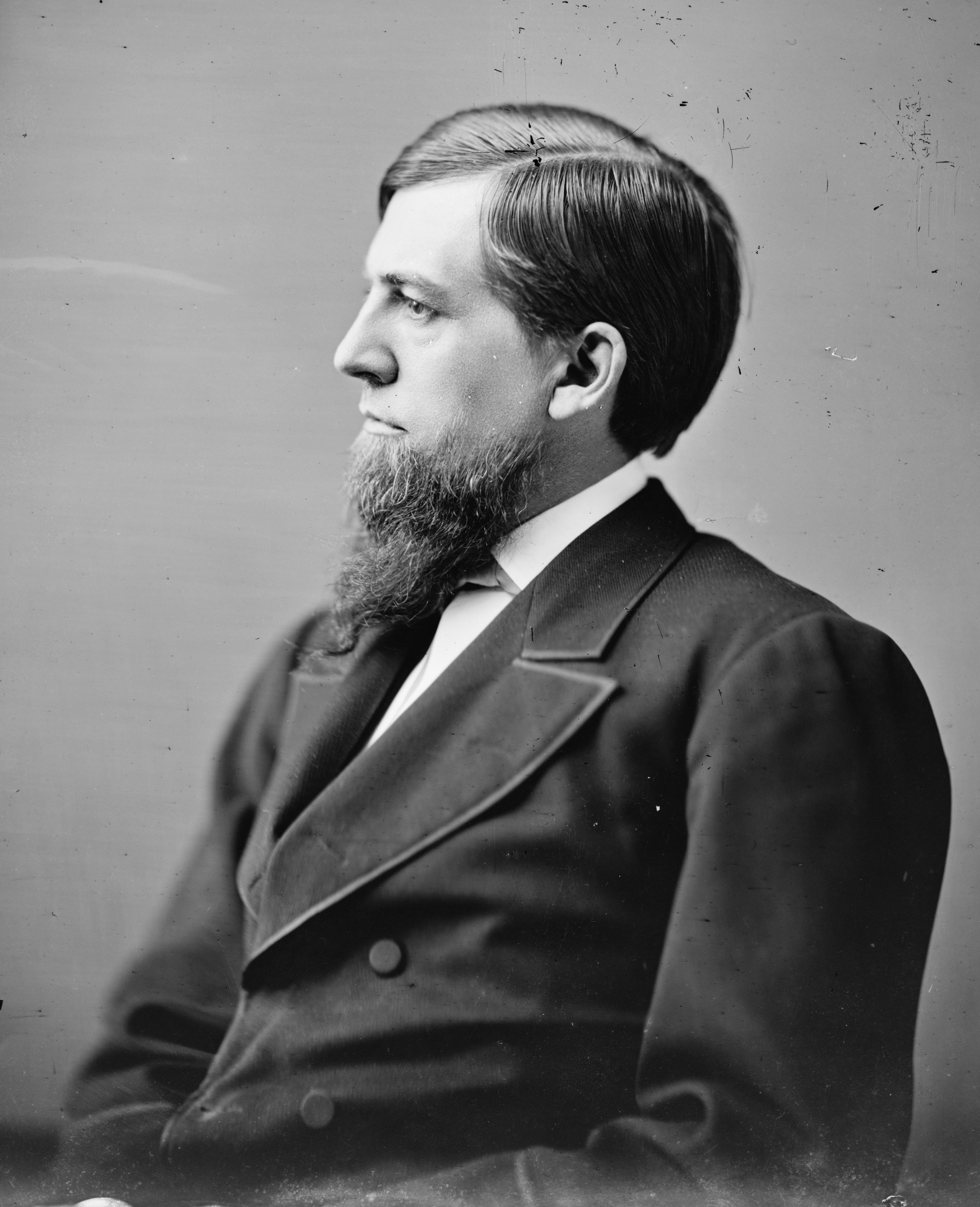
- Portrait of Hale, c. 1865–1880

Chairman of the Senate Republican Conference
- In office December 1908 – March 3, 1911
- Preceded by: William B. Allison
- Succeeded by: Shelby Moore Cullom

United States Senator from Maine
- In office March 4, 1881 – March 3, 1911
- Preceded by: Hannibal Hamlin
- Succeeded by: Charles F. Johnson

Chairman of the House Republican Conference
- In office March 4, 1877 – March 3, 1879
- Speaker: Samuel J. Randall
- Preceded by: George W. McCrary
- Succeeded by: William P. Frye

Member of the U.S. House of Representatives from Maine's 5th district
- In office March 4, 1869 – March 3, 1879
- Preceded by: Frederick A. Pike
- Succeeded by: Thompson H. Murch

Member of the Maine House of Representatives
- In office 1867–1868
- In office 1879–1880

Personal details
- Born: June 9, 1836 Turner, Maine, U.S.
- Died: October 27, 1918 (aged 82) Washington, D.C., U.S.
- Party: Republican
- Spouse: Mary Douglas Chandler (m. 1871)
- Children: 3, including Chandler and Frederick
- Relatives: Zachariah Chandler (father-in-law)
- Occupation: Politician; lawyer

Eugene Hale (June 9, 1836 – October 27, 1918) was an American politician who was a Republican United States Senator from Maine.

== Biography ==
Born in Turner, Maine, he was educated in local schools and at Maine's Hebron Academy. He was admitted to the bar in 1857 and served for nine years as prosecuting attorney for Hancock County, Maine. He was elected to the Maine Legislature 1867–1868, to the U.S. House of Representatives 1869–1879, serving in the 41st and four succeeding Congresses. He was an unsuccessful candidate for reelection in 1878 to the 46th Congress.

Hale was served as a member of the National Monetary Commission. He was also a member of the Delta Kappa Epsilon fraternity (Theta chapter).

=== Blaine faction politics ===
During the 1876 United States presidential election, Hale, along with future senatorial colleague William P. Frye, served as campaign managers for James G. Blaine at the Republican National Convention. Following the election of Republican Rutherford B. Hayes as president following the Compromise of 1877, Blaine, who supported Hayes in the general election, requested the nomination of a New England Republican into a cabinet officer position. At the house of John Sherman, Blaine called for President Hayes to nominate Frye as United States Attorney General. Hayes instead offered to appoint Hale to a cabinet position, countering Blaine's wishes to succeed senator Hannibal Hamlin with Hale.

Hale was a member of the Blaine section, acolytes of James G. Blaine who expressed antipathy towards policies pursued by President Hayes. The faction, a part of the conservative wing of the Republican Party, particularly opposed Hayes' nomination of staunch reformer Carl Schurz to the position of United States Secretary of the Interior.

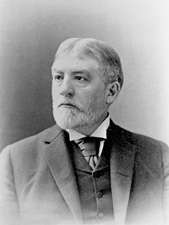
Eugene Hale

Although he declined the post of United States Secretary of the Navy in the Rutherford B. Hayes administration (and had previously declined a Cabinet appointment under Ulysses S. Grant), Senator Hale performed constructive work of the greatest importance in the area of naval appropriations, especially during the early fights for the "new Navy." "I hope," he said in 1884, "that I shall not live many years before I shall see the American Navy what it ought to be, the pet of the American people." Much later in his career, he opposed the building of large numbers of capital ships, which he regarded as less effective in proportion to cost and subject to rapid obsolescence.

In the 1880 United States presidential election, Blaine once again sought the presidency. Hale and Frye once again became his lieutenants in the campaign. The Blaine faction came to blows with the "Stalwart" faction led by Roscoe Conkling, John A. Logan, and Simon Cameron, which advocated the nomination of former president Ulysses S. Grant for a third, non-consecutive presidential term. The irreconcilable bitterness between Conkling and Blaine fueled hostility between the two groups. Hale and Frye were described as "too amateurish and provincial" to sufficiently counterattacks by Conkling. The Blaine faction later formed an alliance with the "Half-Breed" faction to thwart the Stalwarts and nominate Ohio dark horse candidate James A. Garfield, who won the general election against Democratic opponent Winfield Scott Hancock.

In 1881, Hamlin resigned from the United States Senate. Hale, who left Congress following defeat at the hands of the Greenback Party previously in 1878, competed with Frye for the open seat. Due to Frye then having still retained his House seat in contrast to Hale not being office at the time, the latter was given the Senate post. Frye later succeeded Blaine to serve in the Senate, and the two became colleagues in the upper chamber.

Hale received an LL.D. from Bates College in 1882. In 1883, Hale joined Hannibal E. Hamlin, the son of the former vice president, and started the small law firm Hale & Hamlin in Ellsworth, Maine, which is now recognized as Maine's oldest law firm.

=== Senatorial career, later life ===
During the late 1890s, Hale and Senator George F. Hoar of Massachusetts were the most vocal opponents of American intervention into the ongoing insurrection in Cuba. Hale disdained expansionism and jingoism and often challenged claims made by senators on Cuban military victories and Spanish atrocities. He so frequently engaged in verbal jousts with Cuban sympathizers in the Senate that they unfairly accused him of parroting Spanish propaganda and called him "The Senator from Spain."

Hale retired from politics in 1911 and spent the remainder of his life in Ellsworth, Maine, and in Washington, D.C.. In 1914, he suffered a paralytic stroke. In December 1915, newspapers announced that he was "seriously ill of paralysis." He eventually died in Ellsworth in 1918 and is buried in Woodbine Cemetery.

Two ships were named USS Hale for him. He was the father of Frederick Hale, also a U.S. senator from Maine, and of diplomat Chandler Hale.

Gertrude Atherton's novel Senator North (1900) was based on Eugene Hale.

U.S. House of Representatives
Preceded by Frederick A. Pike	Member of the U.S. House of Representatives from Maine's 5th congressional district March 4, 1869 – March 3, 1879	Succeeded by Thompson H. Murch
U.S. Senate
Preceded by Hannibal Hamlin	U.S. senator (Class 1) from Maine; March 4, 1881 – March 3, 1911; Served alongside: William P. Frye	Succeeded by Charles F. Johnson
Honorary titles
Preceded by William B. Allison	Dean of the United States Senate; August 4, 1908 – March 3, 1911	Succeeded by William P. Frye
