= George W. McCrary =

American politician and judge (1835–1890)

George McCrary
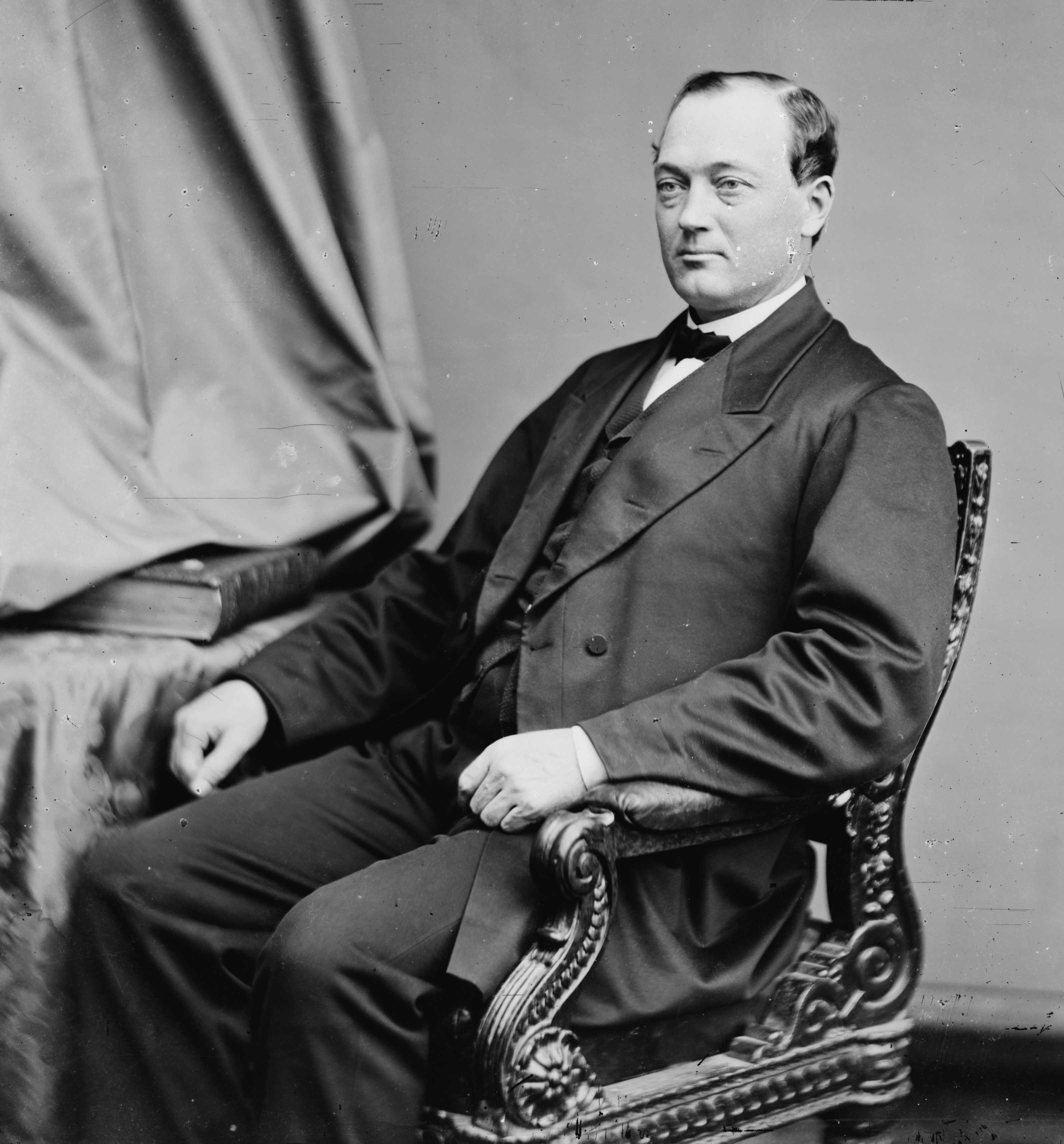
- McCrary, c. 1860–1875

Judge of the United States Circuit Courts for the Eighth Circuit
- In office December 9, 1879 – March 18, 1884
- Appointed by: Rutherford B. Hayes
- Preceded by: John Forrest Dillon
- Succeeded by: David J. Brewer

33rd United States Secretary of War
- In office March 12, 1877 – December 9, 1879
- President: Rutherford B. Hayes
- Preceded by: J. Donald Cameron
- Succeeded by: Alexander Ramsey

Chair of the House Republican Conference
- In office March 4, 1875 – March 3, 1877
- Leader: Michael C. Kerr; Samuel J. Randall
- Preceded by: Horace Maynard
- Succeeded by: Eugene Hale

Member of the U.S. House of Representatives from Iowa's 1st district
- In office March 4, 1869 – March 3, 1877
- Preceded by: James F. Wilson
- Succeeded by: Joseph Champlin Stone

Personal details
- Born: George Washington McCrary; August 29, 1835 Evansville, Indiana, U.S.
- Died: June 23, 1890 (aged 54) St. Joseph, Missouri, U.S.
- Party: Republican

George Washington McCrary (August 29, 1835 – June 23, 1890) was a United States representative from Iowa, the 33rd United States Secretary of War and a United States circuit judge of the United States Circuit Courts for the Eighth Circuit.

== Education and career ==
Born on August 29, 1835, near Evansville, Vanderburg County, Indiana, McCrary moved with his parents in 1836 to the Wisconsin Territory (Iowa Territory from July 4, 1838, State of Iowa from December 28, 1846) who settled in Van Buren County. He attended the public schools, taught in the country schools at age 18, read law at the law firm of future United States Supreme Court Justice Samuel Freeman Miller.

He was admitted to the bar in 1856. He entered private practice in Keokuk, Iowa from 1856 to 1857. He was a member of the Iowa House of Representatives in 1857, resuming private practice in Keokuk from 1858 to 1861. He was a member of the Iowa Senate from 1861 to 1865, again resuming private practice in Keokuk from 1862 to 1869.

== Congressional service ==
In 1868, McCrary successfully sought a U.S. House seat from Iowa's 1st congressional district to succeed Radical Republican James F. Wilson. He was elected as a Republican from the district to the United States House of Representatives of the 41st United States Congress and to the three succeeding Congresses, serving from March 4, 1869, to March 3, 1877. He was Chairman of the Committee on Elections for the 42nd United States Congress and Chairman of the Committee on Railways and Canals for the 43rd United States Congress. He was not a candidate for renomination in 1876.

=== Congressional activity ===
In McCrary's first month in Congress, he received national attention for refusing to support an appropriation for a federal courthouse in Keokuk because the nation was in debt and he could not support such a courthouse in every district. He published A Treatise on the American Law of Elections, in 1875. In the 44th United States Congress, as a member of the United States House Committee on the Judiciary, he was the author of a farsighted (but unsuccessful) bill to reorganize the federal courts to enable reasonable and prompt judicial review. He helped create the Electoral Commission to resolve the outcome of the 1876 Presidential Election, and served on the committee that investigated the Crédit Mobilier scandal.

Maintaining his passion for law, McCrary established an expertise in contested elections and laws pertaining to elections. He published A Treatise on the American Law of Elections in 1875, which later underwent four editions.

During his House years, McCrary allied with the congressional "Half-Breeds," the loosely organized and more moderate wing of the Republican Party (in comparison to the pro-spoils system Stalwarts) which emphasized industrial interests and protective tariffs in addition to supporting civil service reform.

== Secretary of War ==
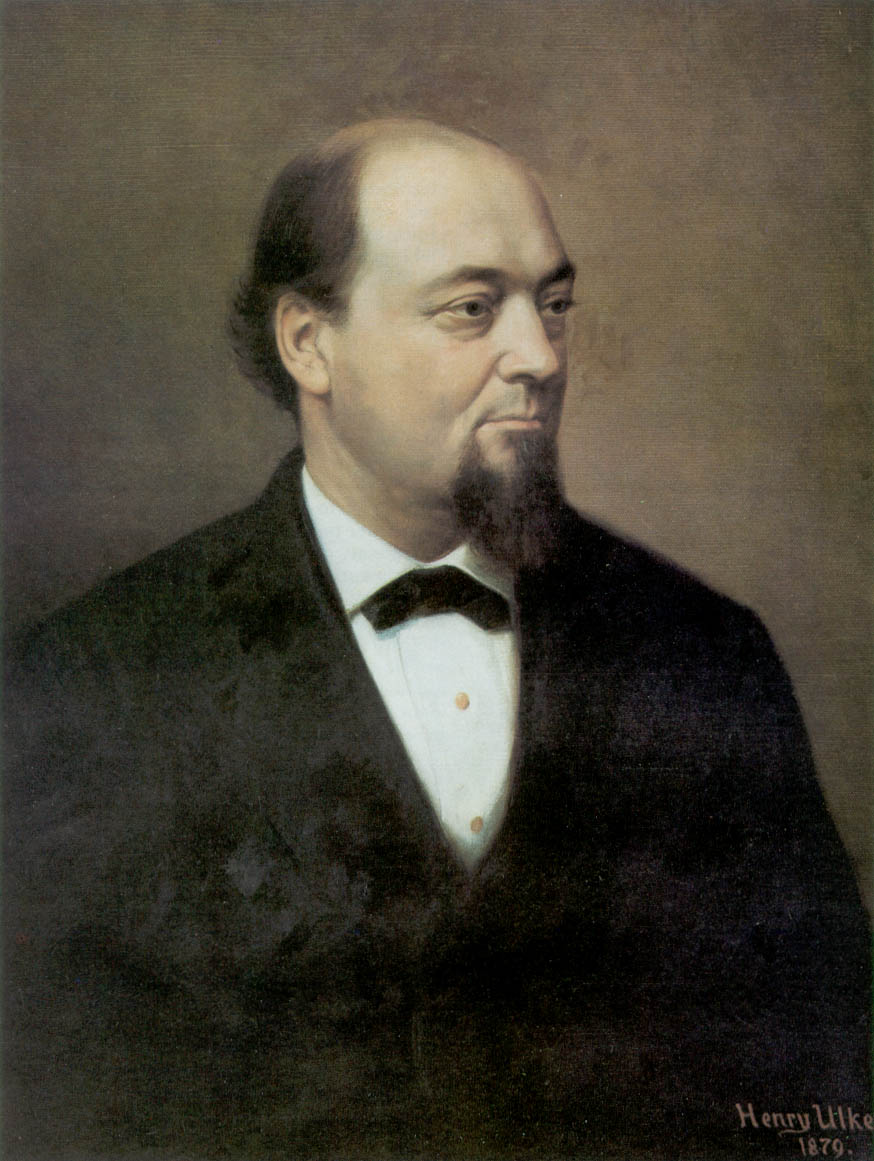
George W. McCrary as Secretary of War.

McCrary was the 33rd United States Secretary of War in the cabinet of President Rutherford B. Hayes from March 12, 1877, to December 11, 1879, when he resigned. As Secretary, McCrary withdrew federal troops from the remaining reconstruction governments in South Carolina and Louisiana, and used federal troops in the 1877 railway strike and in Mexican border disturbances. The greatest military conflicts during his watch occurred in the American West, in battles with certain Native American tribes in Colorado, New Mexico, and elsewhere.

=== Memberships ===
McCrary was elected as a 3rd Class (honorary) member of the Military Order of the Loyal Legion of the United States (MOLLUS). This was probably due to President Hayes' influence as a prominent member of MOLLUS. (Hayes would later serve as MOLLUS commander-in-chief.)

== Federal judicial service ==
McCrary was nominated by President Rutherford B. Hayes on December 1, 1879, to a seat on the United States Circuit Courts for the Eighth Circuit vacated by Judge John Forrest Dillon. He was confirmed by the United States Senate on December 9, 1879, and received his commission the same day. His service terminated on March 18, 1884, due to his resignation, which he attributed to his family's financial need after his many years of public service.

== Later career and death ==
Following his resignation from the federal bench, McCrary resumed private practice in Kansas City, Missouri from 1884 to 1890. He served as general counsel for the Atchison, Topeka and Santa Fe Railroad Company in Kansas City, Missouri from 1884 to 1890. He died on June 23, 1890, in St. Joseph, Missouri, after suffering from a stomach tumor. He was interred in Oakland Cemetery in Keokuk.

== Sources ==
- United States Congress. "George W. McCrary (id: M000379)". Biographical Directory of the United States Congress.
- "McCrary, George Washington - Federal Judicial Center". www.fjc.gov.

U.S. House of Representatives
Preceded by James F. Wilson	Member of the United States House of Representatives from Iowa's 1st congressional district 1869–1877	Succeeded by Joseph Champlin Stone
Party political offices
Preceded by Horace Maynard	Chair of the House Republican Conference; 1875–1877	Succeeded by Eugene Hale
Political offices
Preceded by J. Donald Cameron	United States Secretary of War; 1877–1879	Succeeded by Alexander Ramsey
Legal offices
Preceded by John Forrest Dillon	Judge of the United States Circuit Courts for the Eighth Circuit; 1879–1884	Succeeded by David Josiah Brewer
