= Henry L. Dawes =

American politician (1816–1903)

Henry Laurens Dawes
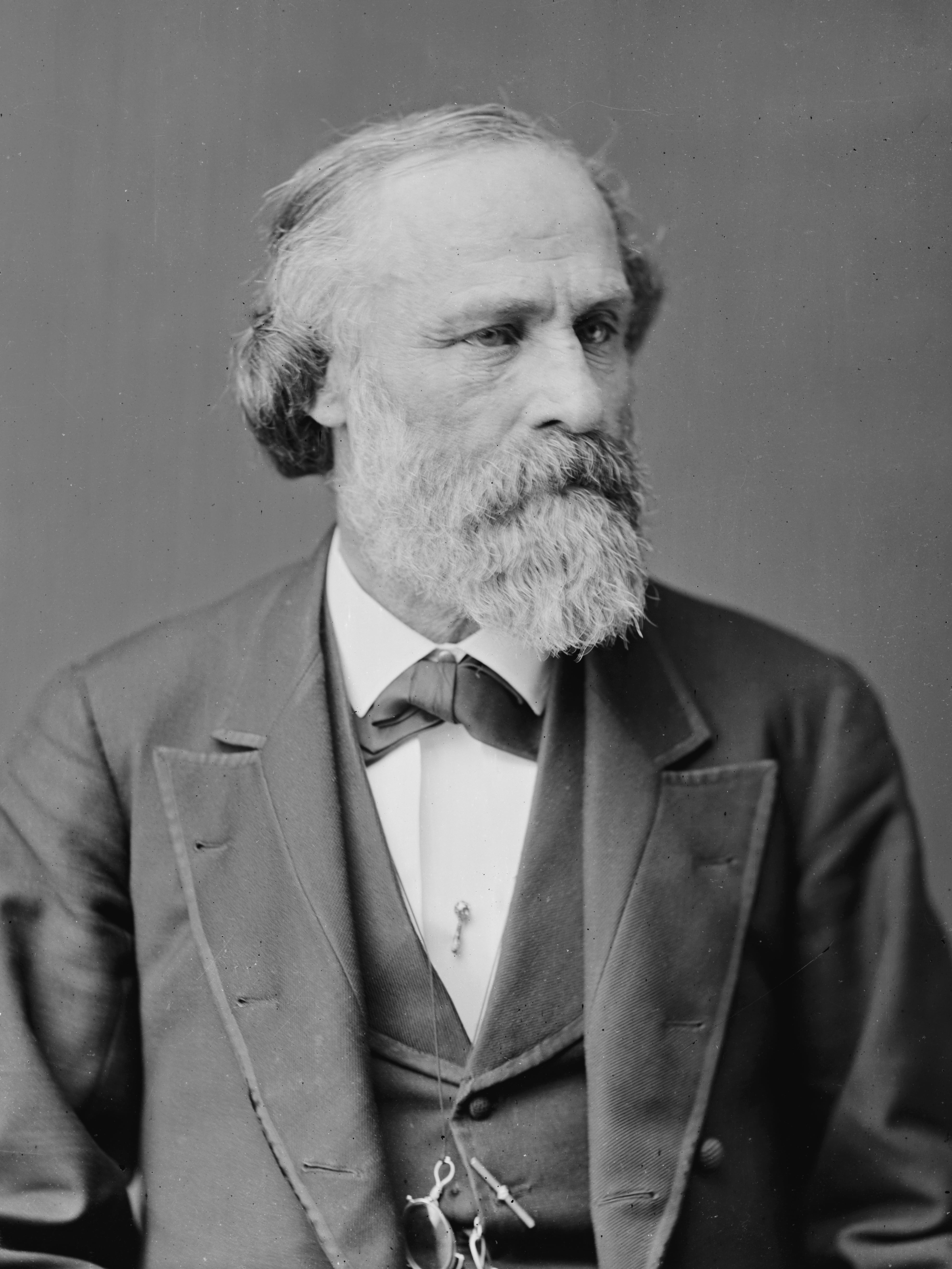
- Dawes c. 1870s

United States Senator from Massachusetts
- In office March 4, 1875 – March 3, 1893
- Preceded by: William B. Washburn
- Succeeded by: Henry Cabot Lodge

Member of the U.S. House of Representatives from Massachusetts
- In office March 4, 1857 – March 4, 1875
- Preceded by: Mark Trafton
- Succeeded by: Chester W. Chapin
- Constituency: 11th district (1857–1863); 10th district (1863–1873); 11th district (1873–1875)

Member of the Massachusetts Senate from the Berkshire district
- In office 1850
- Preceded by: John Z. Goodrich; William A. Phelps
- Succeeded by: Richard P. Brown; Asa G. Welch

Member of the Massachusetts House of Representatives
- In office 1848–1849; 1852

Personal details
- Born: October 30, 1816 Cummington, Massachusetts, US
- Died: February 5, 1903 (aged 86) Pittsfield, Massachusetts, US
- Party: Republican
- Children: 5
- Education: Yale University
- Profession: Lawyer and Doctor
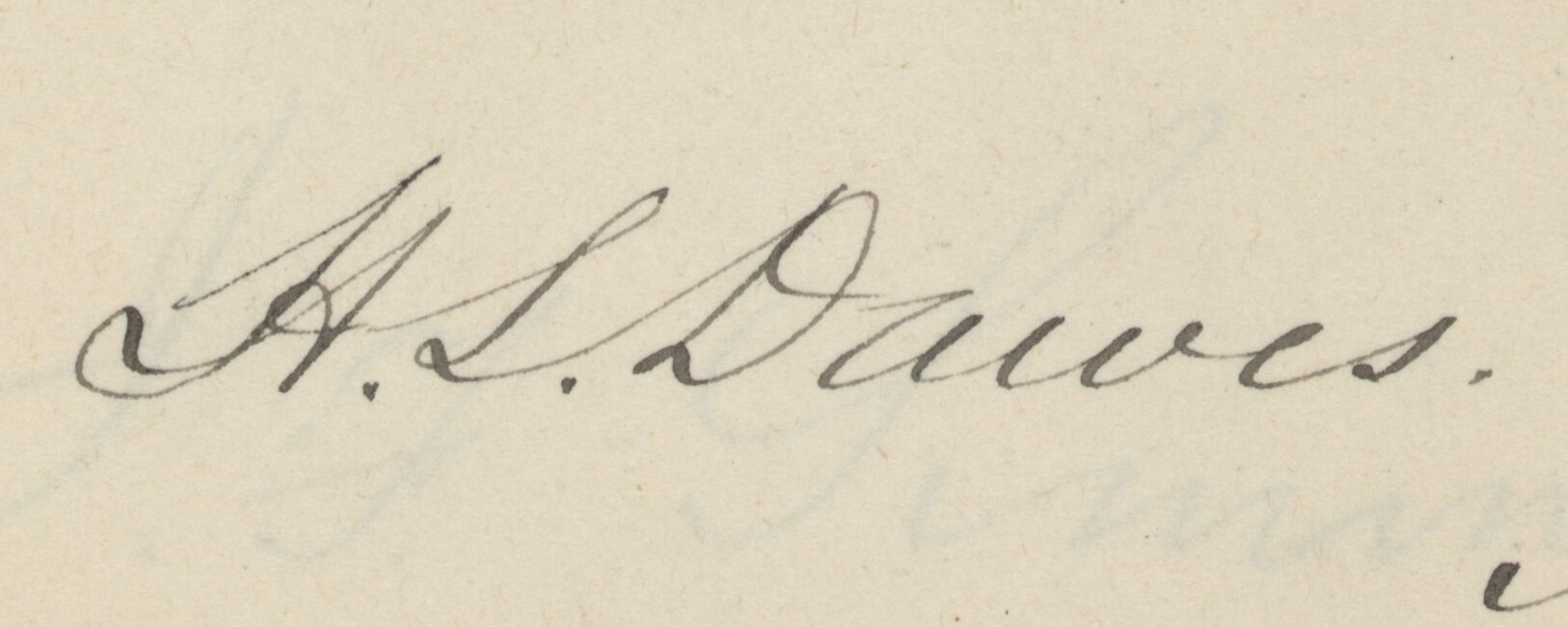
- Signature

Henry Laurens Dawes (October 30, 1816 – February 5, 1903) was an American attorney and politician, a Republican United States senator and United States representative from Massachusetts. He is notable for the Dawes Act (1887), which was intended to stimulate the assimilation of Native Americans by ending the tribal government and control of communal lands. Especially directed at the tribes in Indian Territory, it provided for the allotment of tribal lands to individual households of tribal members, and for their being granted United States citizenship. This also made them subject to state and federal taxes. In addition, extinguishing tribal land claims in this territory later enabled the admission of Oklahoma as a state in 1907.

== Early life ==
Dawes was born in Cummington, Massachusetts, in 1816. After graduating from Yale University in 1839, he taught at Greenfield, Massachusetts, and also edited The Greenfield Gazette.

He studied law with an established firm, and in 1842, was admitted to the bar. He began the practice of law in the village of North Adams, Massachusetts. For a time he edited The North Adams Transcript.

== Political career ==
Dawes joined the Republican Party and was elected to the Massachusetts House of Representatives, serving in 1848–1849 and in 1852. He served in the state Senate in 1850. He was elected as a delegate to the Massachusetts Constitutional Convention of 1853.

From 1853 to 1857 Dawes served as appointed state district attorney for the western district of Massachusetts. He was elected to the United States House of Representatives in 1856, serving multiple terms until 1875. In 1868 he received 2,000 shares of stock in the Crédit Mobilier of America railroad construction company from Representative Oakes Ames, as part of the Union Pacific railway's influence-buying efforts.

In March 1871 Dawes supported federal financing for Ferdinand Vandeveer Hayden's fifth geological survey of the territories, which became a driving force in the creation of Yellowstone National Park. Dawes's son, Chester Dawes, was a member of the survey team. Annie, the first commercial boat on Yellowstone Lake, was purportedly named after his daughter, Anna Dawes. In late 1871 and early 1872, Dawes became an ardent supporter of a bill to create Yellowstone National Park in order to preserve its wilderness and resources.

In 1875 Dawes was chosen by the state legislature (as was the practice at the time) to succeed William B. Washburn as U.S. Senator from Massachusetts. He served multiple terms, until 1893.

During his long period of legislative activity, Dawes served in the House on the committees on elections, ways and means, and appropriations. He took a prominent part in passage of the anti-slavery and Reconstruction measures during and after the Civil War, in tariff legislation, and in the establishment of a fish commission. He also initiated the production of daily weather reports to be provided by the federal government.

In the Senate, Dawes was chairman of the Committee on Indian Affairs. He concentrated on enactment of laws that he believed were for the benefit of the Indians. In the late 19th century, after the Indian Wars, there were widespread fears that the Indians were disappearing and that their tribes would cease to exist. In the West, Indians had been forced onto reservations and were struggling with poor lands and too little area, as well as encroachment by white settlers. In the East, most Indians were landless and were largely believed to have entered or been marginal to majority culture. Well-meaning people such as Dawes believed that the Indians had to assimilate to majority culture to survive, and should take up subsistence farming, still dominant in agriculture.

In 1869 Dawes became a founding member of the Monday Evening Club, a men's literary society in Pittsfield, Massachusetts.

=== Strategist for "Half-Breed" Republicans ===
During the presidency of Rutherford B. Hayes (spanning 1877–81), Dawes was a prominent member of congressional "Half-Breeds" within the Republican Party allied with Hayes' support for civil service reform. Along with fellow Massachusetts senatorial Half-Breed George F. Hoar and Rep. John Davis Long, he became one of the faction's leading strategists.

During the 1880 United States presidential election, the agreed strategy planned was to prevent either former president Ulysses S. Grant, the leader of "Stalwarts," nor Blaine faction leader James G. Blaine of Maine, from obtaining the nomination at the Republican National Convention. Instead, the Half-Breeds would push to nominate faction member George F. Edmunds, a senator from Vermont.

However, Sen. Hoar admonished Half-Breed supporters that Republican delegates should not make their preferences clearly visible to others. Although the Massachusetts delegation did support Edmunds, the Vermont Half-Breed failed to garner enough support, and the faction ultimately formed an alliance with Blaine supporters in successfully nominating James A. Garfield of Ohio.

=== Dawes accepts Blaine into Half-Breed ranks ===
When President Garfield took office, Blaine was made United States Secretary of State for the administration. The Maine Republican's credentials as a Half-Breed were spotty due to his history of antipathy towards civil service reform, though nonetheless were welcomed by Hoar and Dawes as a member of the faction. However, Edmunds, who Half-Breeds supported in 1880, broke from Dawes and Hoar in refusing to accept Blaine as a genuine convert. Indeed, the Vermont senator refused to support Blaine when the latter was nominated by the Republican National Convention in the 1884 presidential election.

=== Support for civil service reform ===
Like all early Half-Breeds who were relatively prominent during the Hayes presidency, Dawes supported civil service reform. During the presidency of James A. Garfield, he wrote two letters at separate occasions in July 1881 on the matter.

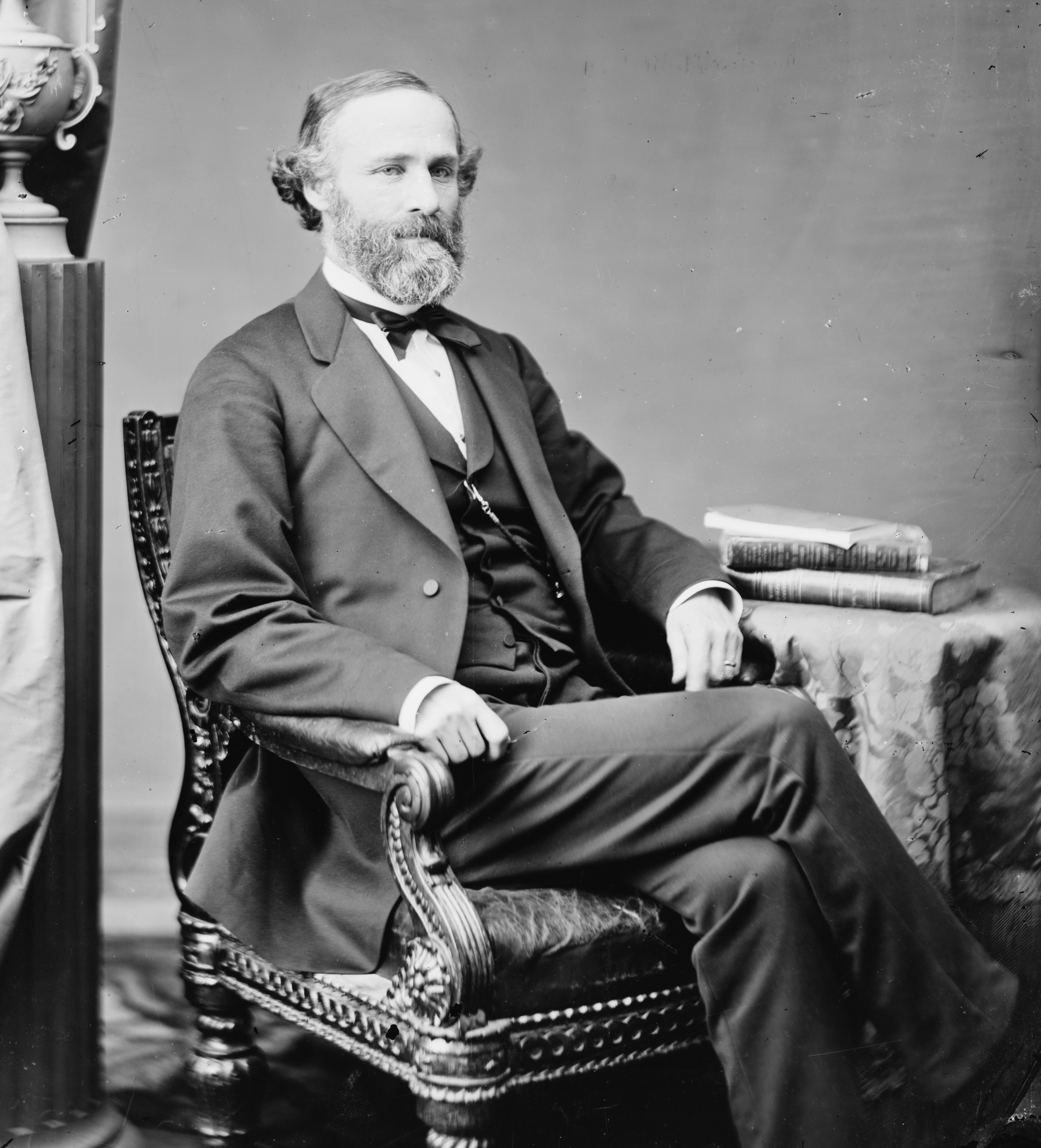
Henry L. Dawes

=== Dawes Act ===
The Dawes Act was intended to assimilate Indians by encouraging them to undertake subsistence farming, then widespread in American society. Enacted in 1887, it was amended in 1891, again in 1898 by the Curtis Act, and again in 1906 by the Burke Act.

The Dawes Commission, set up under an Indian Office appropriation bill in 1893, was created not to administer the Act but to attempt to persuade the tribes excluded from the Act by treaties to agree to the allotment plan. After gaining agreement from representatives of the Five Civilized Tribes in Indian Territory, the commission appointed registrars to register members on rolls prior to allotment of lands. Many tribes have since based membership and citizen qualifications on descent from persons listed as Indians on the Dawes Rolls. (Also listed were freedmen of each tribe, and intermarried whites.)

On leaving the Senate in 1893, Dawes became chairman of the commission to the Five Civilized Tribes, also known as the Dawes Commission, and served for ten years. He negotiated with the tribes for the extinction of the communal title to their land and for the dissolution of the tribal governments. The goal was to make tribal members a constituent part of the United States. In the process Native American tribes lost about 90 million acres (360,000 km^{2}) of treaty land, or about two thirds of their 1887 land base, over the life of the Dawes Act. About 90,000 Indians were made landless. The Act forced Native people onto small tracts of land, distant from their kin relations. The allotment policy depleted the land base and ended hunting as a means of subsistence, creating a crisis for many tribes.

The Coolidge administration studied the effects of the Dawes Act and the current conditions for Indians in what is known as the Meriam Report, completed in 1928. It found that the Dawes Act had been used illegally to deprive Native Americans of their land rights.

== Death ==
Dawes died in Pittsfield, Massachusetts, on February 5, 1903.

== In popular culture ==
Aidan Quinn played Dawes in the film Bury My Heart at Wounded Knee, adapted from Dee Brown's 1970 history of Native Americans, the United States, and the West

U.S. House of Representatives
Preceded by Mark Trafton	Member of the U.S. House of Representatives from Massachusetts's 11th congressional district 1857–1863	District eliminated
Preceded by Charles Delano	Member of the U.S. House of Representatives from Massachusetts's 10th congressional district 1863–1873	Succeeded by Alvah Crocker
New district	Member of the U.S. House of Representatives from Massachusetts's 11th congressional district 1873–1875	Succeeded by Chester W. Chapin
U.S. Senate
Preceded by William B. Washburn	U.S. senator (Class 1) from Massachusetts; 1875–1893; Served alongside: George S. Boutwell and George F. Hoar	Succeeded by Henry Cabot Lodge
