= Blaine faction =

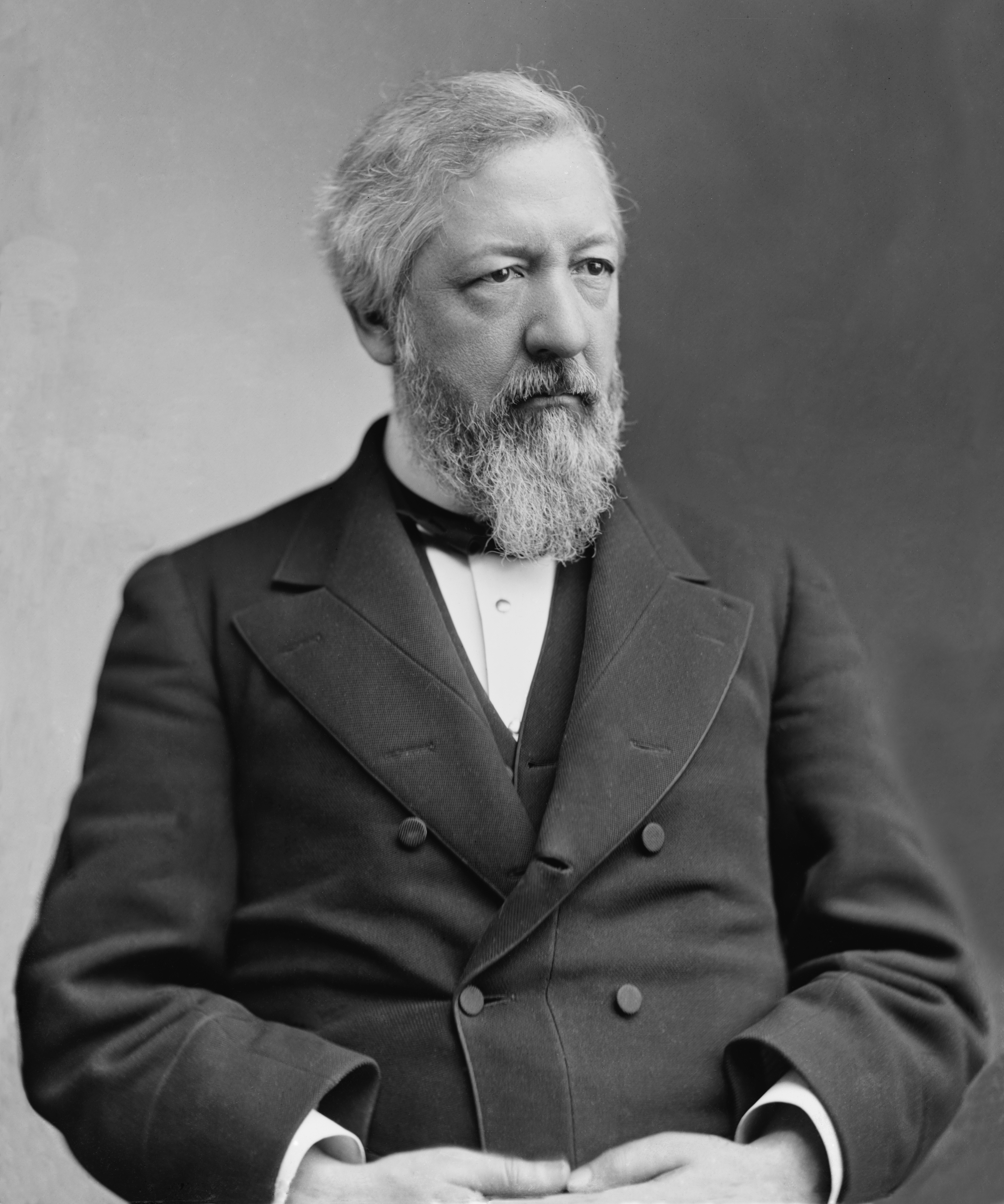
- Leader: James G. Blaine; William P. Frye; Eugene Hale; William H. Robertson; William E. Chandler
- Founded: 1877
- Split from: Stalwart faction of the Republican Party
- Merged into: Half-Breed faction of the Republican Party
- Ideology: Anti-Grantism; Conservative liberalism Classical liberalism Economic nationalism Protectionism; Hard money Pro-spoils system (Note: This was prior to the Garfield assassination; the Blaine faction were not hostile to civil service reform afterwards.)
- National affiliation: Republican Party; Half-Breed faction (1880)

The Blaine faction, also known as the Blaine section, was a political organization of Republicans in the United States during the presidency of Rutherford B. Hayes who coalesced around Maine U.S. senator James G. Blaine. Forming a coalition with the generally more conservative Stalwart wing during the era, they opposed civil service reform, as well as the conciliatory actions of the Hayes administration towards the South. Blaine himself would vote with Stalwarts in opposition to President Hayes' reform efforts, siding with Conkling's faction in December 1877 when voting against the nomination of Theodore Roosevelt Sr., to become New York Collector of Customs.

The faction in the context of the Hayes years is often erroneously attributed as the congressional "Half-Breeds", a moderate wing of the Republican Party which advocated civil service reform. According to Richard E. Welch Jr., Blaine was not a Half-Breed during this time, instead taking part as a dissident member of the Stalwarts. Half-Breeds trusted neither Blaine nor Grant, preferring a "third man" for president in the 1880 United States presidential election who was a loyal advocate of civil service reform. According to Allan Peskin, Blaine never referred to his allies as "Half-Breeds", instead preferring the term "the Blaine Section".

The ambiguity between the Blaine faction and Half-Breeds regarding most of the Hayes presidency years is a revisionist historical inaccuracy that ignores the sharp contrasts between the groups; Blaine sharply came at odds with Hayes after 1877, and a mutual bitter antipathy was held between him and Half-Breed leader John Sherman that lasted for over a decade.

Blaine's chief allies during the presidency of Rutherford B. Hayes were William P. Frye and Eugene Hale, both of whom later served in the United States Senate from Maine as colleagues.

== Characteristics ==
The division and antipathy between the Conkling and Blaine factions was attributed to a personal rivalry between the two political bosses dating since the 1860s. However, their political machines had little differences between them, benefiting from patronage and the practices of the traditional spoils system. While the political organization of Roscoe Conkling emphasized support for "sound money" (also known as "hard money") in their association with New York financial interests, the Blaine organization placed stronger focus on industrial and railroad interests, in addition to their advocacy of the protective tariff.

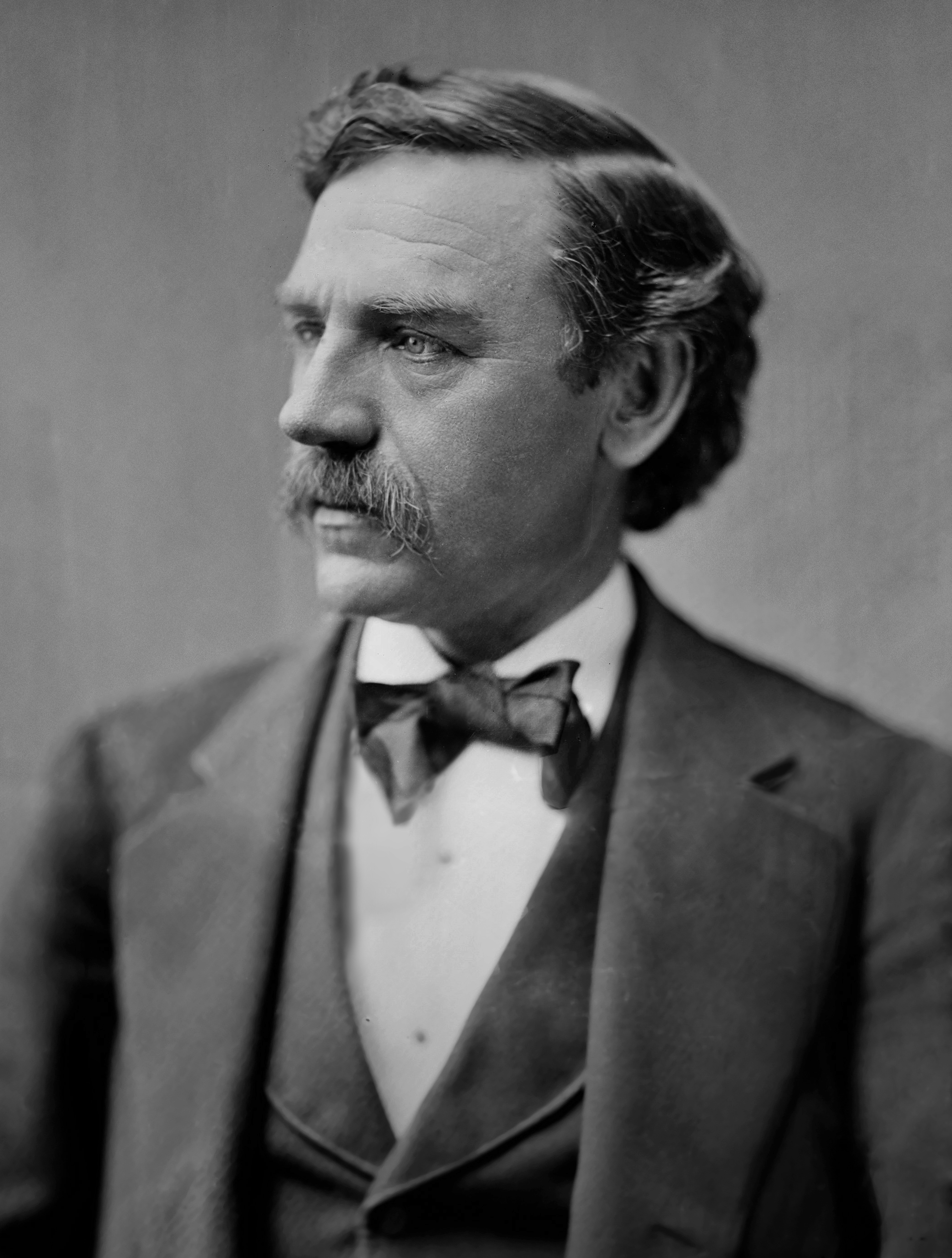
Portrait of William P. Frye.

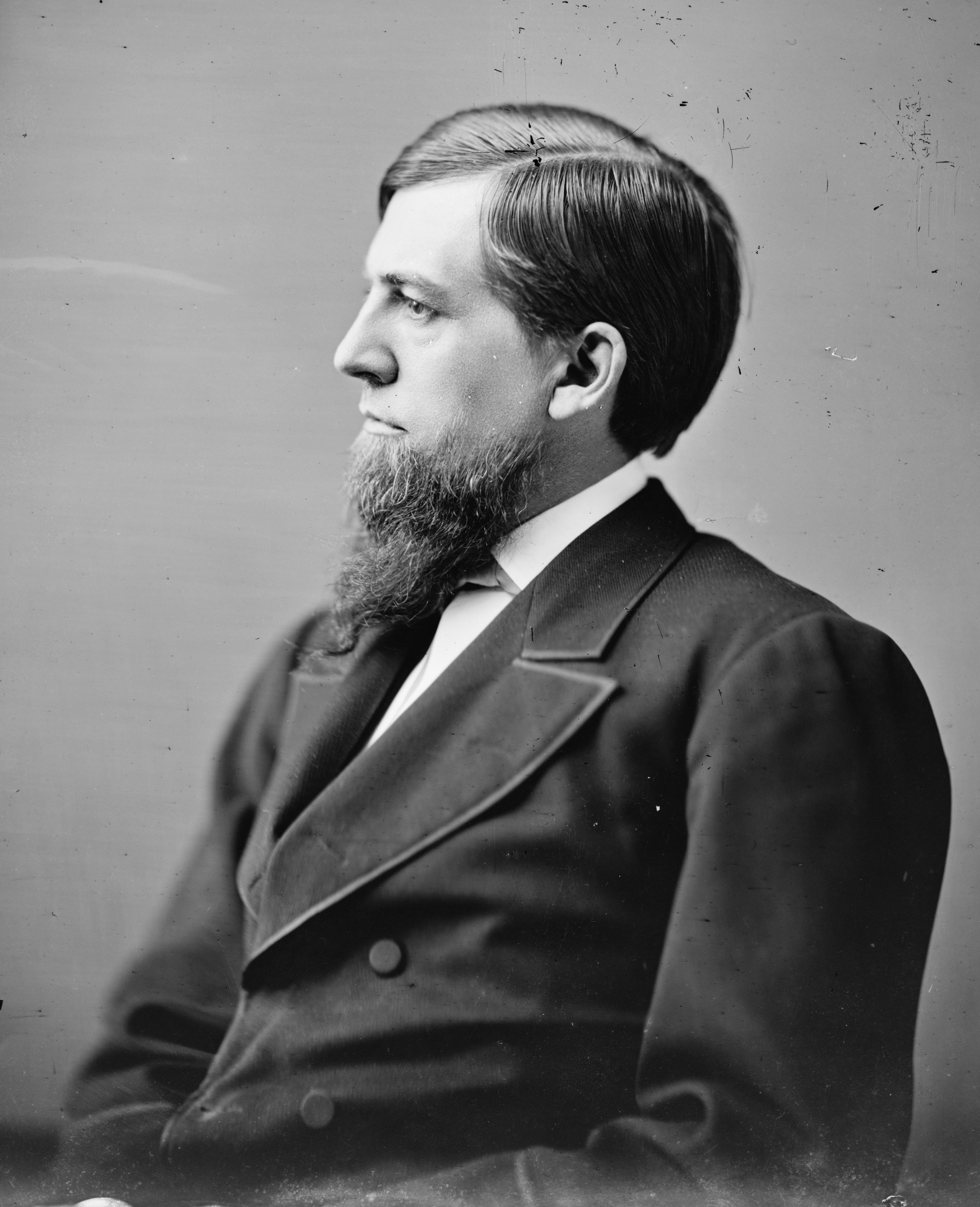
Portrait of Eugene Hale.

== Hayes presidency ==
During the 1876 United States presidential election, Sen. Blaine supported the campaign of Rutherford Hayes against Bourbon Democrat opponent Samuel J. Tilden. Following the Compromise of 1877 and the Hayes administration's withdrawal of troops of the South, Blaine was grieved and distraught over the abandonment of Reconstruction efforts to an extent greater than the anguish expressed by Stalwart leaders Roscoe Conkling, J. Donald Cameron, and Zachariah Chandler.

The Blaine faction frequently sparred with the Hayes administration on occasions. At the residence of fellow U.S. senator John Sherman, Sen. Blaine advocated an appointment by Hayes of William Frye to become Attorney General of the United States. Instead, Hayes offered to grant the position to Eugene Hale, although Blaine intended to succeed Maine Sen. Hannibal Hamlin with Hale. The tension increased when Hayes had appointed staunch reformer Carl Schurz to become United States Secretary of the Interior. Schurz in the 1872 United States presidential election led the Liberal Republican Party revolt against Ulysses S. Grant, who Blaine campaigned on behalf of.

In a temporary victory for Stalwarts on one occasion, Conkling secured the powerful position of Collector of the Port of New York for loyalist and future president Chester A. Arthur. Arthur's tenure was marked with cronyism and corruption, hiring thousands of Republicans on the mere basis of political affiliation. Hayes and Secretary of the Treasury John Sherman, a Half-Breed, subsequently fired Arthur from the post. The decision elicited criticism and distaste by both Stalwarts and the Blaine faction. The rift between the Blaine faction and the Hayes administration subsequently reached a point that effectively sealed any remaining chances for Hayes' potential re-election.

When Hayes nominated reform-friendly allies Edwin A. Merritt and Silas W. Burt to the positions of New York Custom of Collectors and Naval Officer respectively, prominent Half-Breed leaders such as George F. Hoar and Stanley Matthews voted to consent to the president's nominations while Blaine joined Stalwarts such as Conkling and William B. Allison in unsuccessful opposition.

== 1880 Republican National Convention: Conkling and Blaine come to blows ==
In the 1880 United States presidential election, the Republican Party was marred by factionalism, divided into three main groups:

- Stalwarts, headed by Roscoe Conkling, John A. Logan, as well as Simon Cameron and his son J. Donald Cameron
- Half-Breeds, headed by strategists George Frisbie Hoar, Henry L. Dawes and John D. Long of Massachusetts
- the Blaine faction, organized by Frye and Hale

The Stalwarts pushed for a third, non-consecutive term for former president Ulysses S. Grant in their effort to revive the Radical Republicans' Reconstruction program of Thaddeus Stevens and Charles Sumner, while Half-Breeds advocated a nomination of George F. Edmunds. There existed an irreconcilable feud between the Stalwarts and Blaine faction, attributed not to any grievances held by Grant, rather due to the persisting personal enmity between Conkling and Blaine.

According to Ronald F. Banks, Frye and Hale exhibited "amateurish and provincial" tendencies in their quarrels with Conkling, who humiliated Frye in a manner described as "half sneer and half insult." Frye reportedly only displayed "poise and eloquence" when seconding a nomination of Blaine.

Initially, none of the factions achieved their nomination aims. The Blaine faction and Half-Breeds ultimately formed an alliance to thwart the Stalwarts, throwing support to dark horse candidate James A. Garfield of Ohio. The Stalwarts' aims were weakened when pro-Grant New York Republicans were derailed by state senator and leading Blaine supporter William H. Robertson, whose opposition towards the Conkling forces triggered anti-Grant sentiment throughout the convention. A strategic maneuvering by Half-Breeds installed their leader Hoar as chairman of the convention, and Garfield was nominated. In the November general election, Garfield narrowly triumphed over Democratic nominee Winfield Scott Hancock.
