= Civil service reform in the United States =

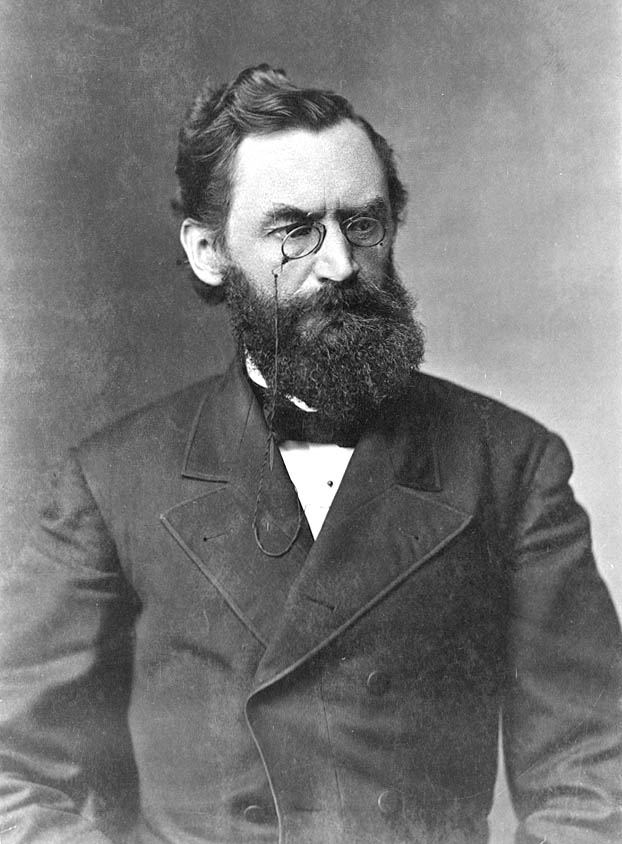
Carl Schurz, founder of the Liberal Republican Party and prominent advocate of civil service reform.

Civil service reform in the United States was a major issue in the late 19th century at the national level, and in the early 20th century at the state level. Proponents denounced the distribution of government offices—the "spoils"—by the winners of elections to their supporters as corrupt and inefficient. They demanded nonpartisan scientific methods and credential be used to select civil servants. The five important civil service reforms were the two Tenure of Office Acts of 1820 and 1867, Pendleton Civil Service Reform Act of 1883, the Hatch Acts (1939 and 1940) and the CSRA of 1978. In addition, President Cleveland's 1888 Executive Order drastically expanded the civil service system.

Early aggressive demands for civil service reform, particularly stemming from Democratic arguments, were associated with white supremacy and opposition towards economic and social gains made by Black people through the spoils system which pro-civil rights Republican "Stalwarts" shrewdly utilized during the Reconstruction and Gilded Age eras. Historian Eric Foner writes that at the time of the Reconstruction era, Black people recognized that the establishing of a civil service system would prevent "the whole colored population" from holding public office.

Among contemporary criticisms of the United States civil service system, some argue that the provisions of the Pendleton Act allowing for arbitrary expansion of civil service protections through the usage of federal executive action result in a subsequently massive bureaucracy that cannot be held to account.

== Spoils system ==
In 1801 President Thomas Jefferson, alarmed that Federalists dominated the civil service and the army, identified the party affiliation of office holders and systematically appointed Democratic-Republicans. Andrew Jackson in 1829 began the systematic rotation of officeholders after four years, replacing them with his partisans in a controversial move. By the 1830s the "spoils system" meant the systematic replacement of officeholders every time the government changed party hands. Winning candidates would dole out government positions to those who had supported his political party prior to the election.

== Reform efforts ==
The first code of civil service reforms was designed to replace patronage appointees with nonpartisan employees qualified because of their skills.

=== Ulysses S. Grant ===
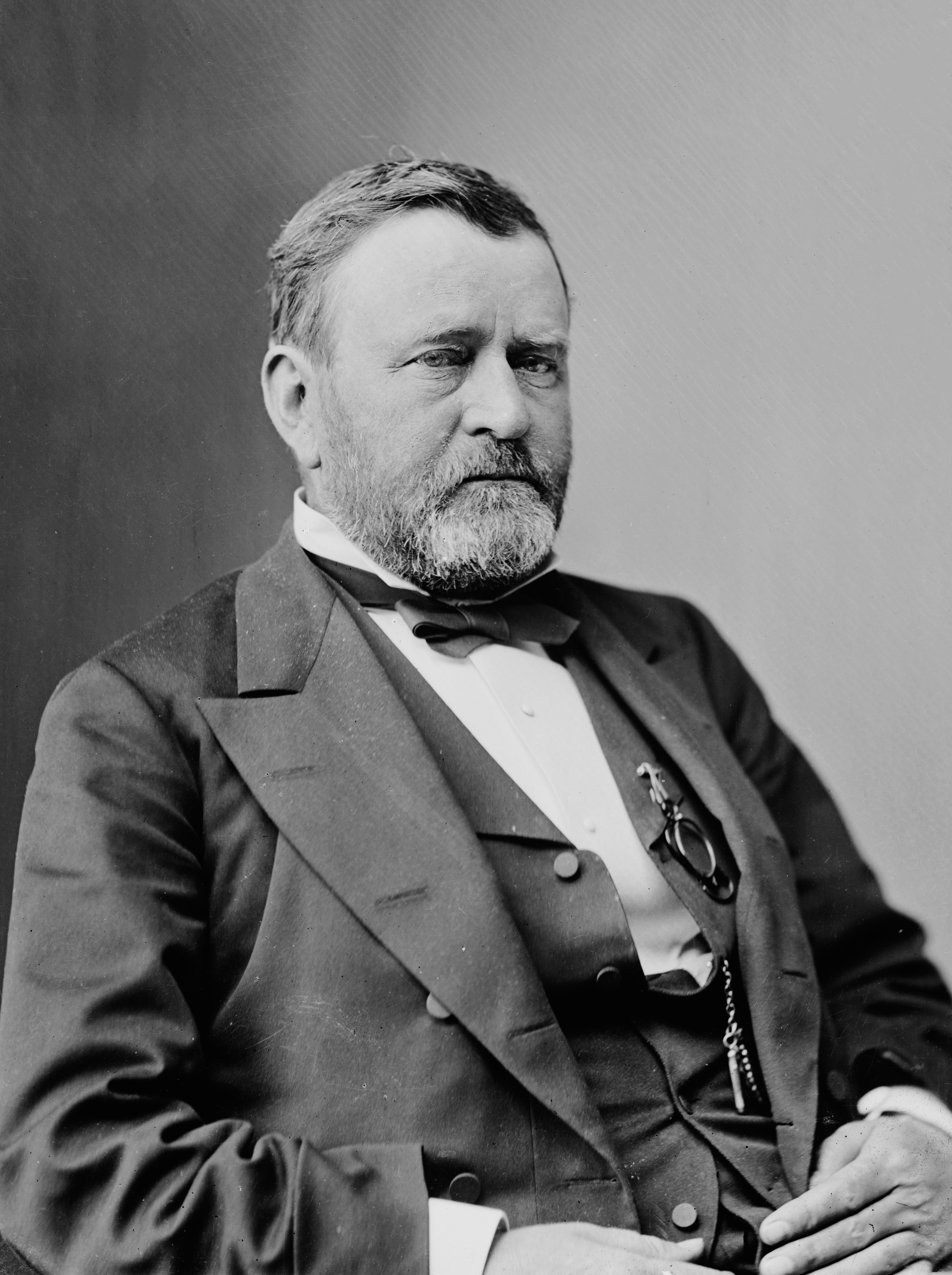
President Ulysses S. Grant

President Ulysses S. Grant (1869–1877) spoke out in favor of civil service reform, and rejected demands in late 1872 by Pennsylvania senator Simon Cameron and governor John Hartranft to suspend the rules and make patronage appointments.

Grant's Civil Service Commission reforms had limited success, as his cabinet implemented a merit system that increased the number of qualified candidates and relied less on congressional patronage. Interior Secretary Columbus Delano, however, exempted his department from competitive examinations, and Congress refused to enact permanent Civil Service reform. Zachariah Chandler, who succeeded Delano, made sweeping reforms in the entire Interior Department; Grant ordered Chandler to fire all corrupt clerks in the Bureau of Indian Affairs. Grant appointed reformers Edwards Pierrepont and Marshall Jewell as Attorney General and Postmaster General, respectively, who supported Bristow's investigations. In 1875, Pierrepont cleaned up corruption among the United States Attorneys and Marshals in the South.

Grant, who did not share the mindset of liberal reformers, faced opposition by the insurgent Liberal Republican Party in the 1872 United States presidential election in spite of his reform efforts within the federal government. The Liberal Republicans, led by Charles Sumner, B. Gratz Brown, and Carl Schurz, nominated Horace Greeley, who would lose the general election to Grant.

=== The Pendleton Act ===
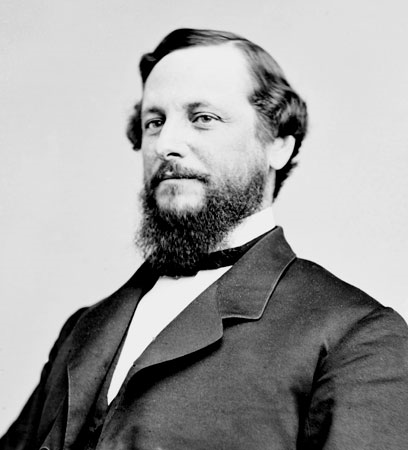
Senator George H. Pendleton of Ohio

The Civil Service Reform Act (called "the Pendleton Act") is an 1883 federal law that created the United States Civil Service Commission. It eventually placed most federal employees on the merit system and marked the end of the so-called "spoils system". Drafted and signed in to law by President Chester A. Arthur, the Pendleton Act served as a response to President James Garfield's assassination by a disappointed office seeker. The Act was passed into law in January 1883; it was sponsored by Democratic senator George H. Pendleton of Ohio. It was drafted by Dorman Bridgman Eaton, a leading reformer who became the first chairman of the U.S. Civil Service Commission. Its most famous commissioner was Theodore Roosevelt (1889–95).

The new law prohibited mandatory campaign contributions, or "assessments", which amounted to 50–75% of party financing in the Gilded Age. Second, the Pendleton Act required entrance exams for aspiring bureaucrats. At first it covered very few jobs but there was a ratchet provision whereby outgoing presidents could lock in their own appointees by converting their jobs to civil service. Political reformers, typified by the Mugwumps demanded an end to the spoils system. After a series of party reversals at the presidential level (in 1884, 1888, 1892, 1896), the result was that most federal jobs were under civil service. One result was more expertise and less politics. An unintended result was the shift of the parties to reliance on funding from business, since they could no longer depend on patronage hopefuls. Mark Hanna found a substitute revenue stream in 1896, by assessing corporations.

=== Mugwumps ===
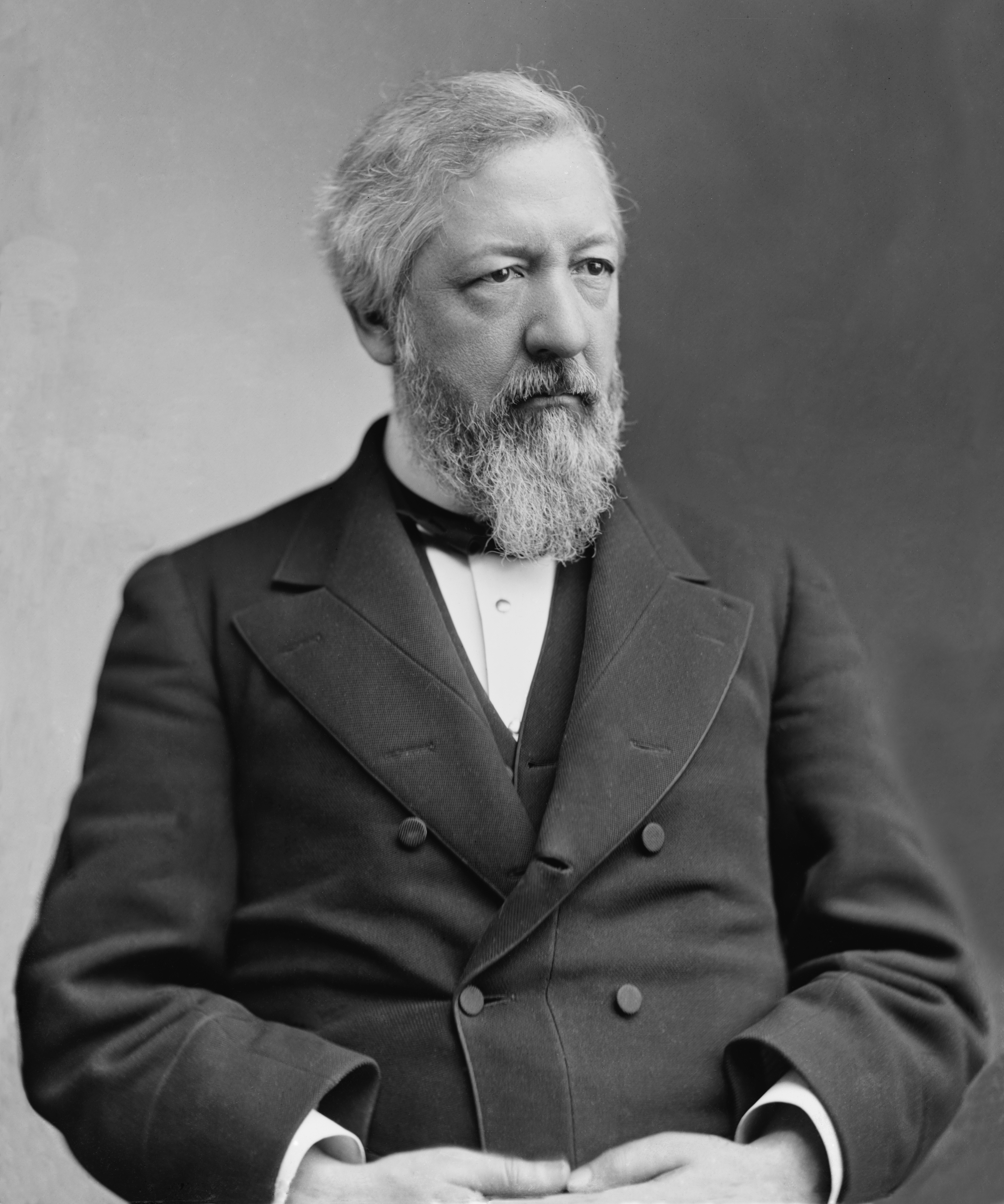
The Mugwumps were Republicans who refused to support Republican presidential candidate James G. Blaine in 1884.

Although the Pendleton Act of 1883 made competency and merit the base qualifications for government positions, its effective implementation was slow. Political affiliation continued to be the basis for appointment to many positions.

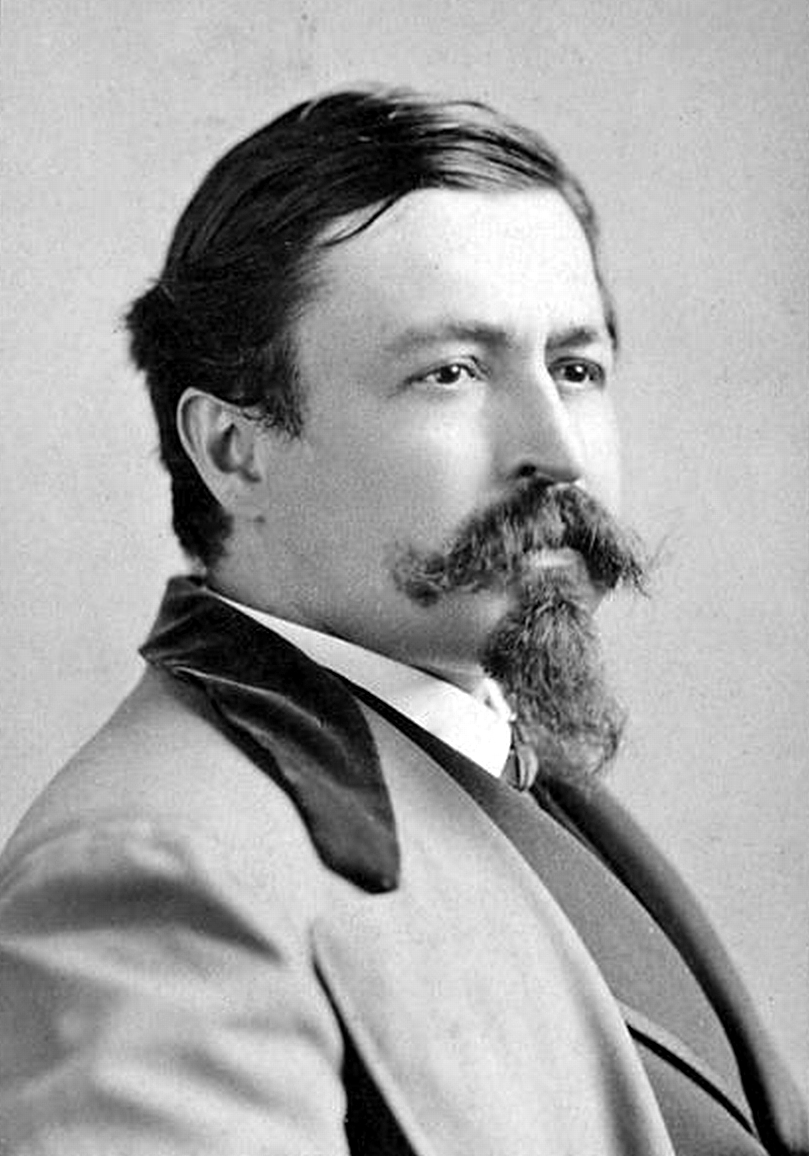
Cartoonist Thomas Nast of Harper's Weekly was a leading Mugwump strongly opposed to Blaine.

In the early 1880s, the issue of political patronage split the Republican Party down the middle for several consecutive sessions of Congress. The party was divided into two warring factions, each with creative names. The side that held the upper hand in numbers and popular support were the Half-Breeds, led by senator James G. Blaine of Maine since 1880. The Half-Breeds supported civil service reform, and often blocked legislation and political appointments put forth by their main congressional opponents, the Stalwarts, led by Roscoe Conkling of New York.

Ironically, in spite of Blaine's status as a convert into the pro-civil service reform Half-Breeds, the Mugwumps rejected his candidacy for president in 1884 primarily due to his corruption. Their ranks were informally joined by Vermont Republican George F. Edmunds, a staunch Half-Breed who never accepted Blaine as an honest convert and opposed the Maine senator's candidacy. During the campaign, Edmunds stated:

It is my deliberate opinion that Senator Blaine acts as the attorney of Jay Gould. Whenever [Allen G. Thurman] and I have settled upon legislation to bring the Pacific Railroad to terms of equity with the government, up has jumped Mr. James G. Blaine musket in hand, from behind the breastworks of Jay Gould’s lobby to fire in our faces.

This division among Republicans may have contributed to the victory in 1884 of Grover Cleveland, the first president elected from the Democratic party since the Civil War. In the period from 1876 to 1892, presidential elections were closely contested at the national level, but the states themselves were mostly dominated by a single party, with Democrats prevailing in the South and the Republicans in the Northeast. Although the defection of the Mugwumps may have helped Cleveland win in New York, one of the few closely contested states, historians attribute Cleveland's victory nationwide to the rising power of urban immigrant voters.

=== Progressive era ===
The 1883 law only applied to federal jobs: not to the state and local jobs that were the main basis for political machines. Ethical degeneration was halted by reform in civil service and municipal reform in the Progressive Era, which led to structural changes in administrative departments and changes in the way the government managed public affairs.

=== Recent civil service reform efforts ===
==== George W. Bush administration efforts ====
The 2001 September 11 attacks gave George W. Bush the political support needed in order to launch civil service reforms in US agencies related to national security. At first these efforts primarily targeted the then-new Department of Homeland Security (DHS), but the Department of Defense (DOD) also received large reform efforts. According to Kellough, Nigro, and Brewer, such attempts included "restrictions on collective bargaining, such as the authority given to departmental secretaries (and, in the case of the DOD, other high-level officials as well) unilaterally to [repeal] negotiated agreements and the limitations imposed on employee rights in adverse actions." However, ultimately the efforts at civil service reform were undone. The DHS announced on 1 October, 2008 that it was abandoning the new civil service system and returning to the previous one.

==== Barack Obama administration efforts ====
Throughout President Barack Obama's Administration, the United States Office of Personnel Management (OPM)'s "overarching focus was to modernize the way OPM supports agencies, current and former federal employees, and their families so that the Federal Workforce better serves the American people."

==== Donald Trump administration efforts ====
President Donald Trump took action on reforming the civil service by signing "a trio of executive orders that reform civil service rules by expediting termination for cause, revamping union contracts and limiting taxpayer-funded union work at agencies" in May 2018. In October 2020, Trump signed another executive order transferring at least 100,000 government jobs from being classified as "competitive service" to "excepted service" (Schedule F appointments), a move which Laurie Garrett, writing for CNN, deemed an undermining of the Pendleton Act.

==== Joe Biden administration efforts ====
In January 2021, President Joe Biden signed an executive order reversing the actions of his predecessor President Trump.

== Bibliography ==
- Fesler, James W. and Donald F. Kettl. The Politics of the Administrative Process, (2nd ed. 1996), textbook.
- Hoogenboom, Ari. Outlawing the Spoils: A History of the Civil Service Reform Movement, 1865–1883 (1961)
- Hoogenboom, Ari. "The Pendleton Act and the Civil Service Reform." American Historical Review 1959. 64: 301–18. in JSTOR.
- Hoogenboom, Ari. "Thomas A. Jenckes and Civil Service Reform." Mississippi Valley Historical Review 1961. 47: 636–58. in JSTOR
- Huddleston, Mark W., and William W. Boyer. The Higher Civil Service in the United States: Quest for Reform (1996),
- Ingraham, Patricia Wallace. The Foundation of Merit: Public Service in American Democracy. 1995.
- Ingraham, Patricia W., and David H. Rosenbloom, eds. The Promise and Paradox of Civil Service Reform, (1992
- Johnson, Ronald N., and Gary D. Libecap. The Federal Civil Service System and the Problem of Bureaucracy: The Economics and Politics of Institutional Change 1994
- Moynihan, Donald P. "Protection Versus Flexibility: the Civil Service Reform Act, Competing Administrative Doctrines, and the Roots of Contemporary Public Management Debate." Journal of Policy History 2004 16(1): 1–33. ISSN 0898-0306 Fulltext: [ 1. Project Muse and Ebsco
- Park, Soo-Young. "Who Is Our Master? Congressional Debates during Civil Service Reforms." PhD dissertation Virginia Polytechnic Inst. and State U. 2005. 218 pp. DAI 2006 67(2): 715-A. DA3208258
- Roark, James L.; Johnson, Michael P.; Furstenburg, Francois; Cline Cohen, Patricia; Hartmann, Susan M.; Stage, Sarah; Igo, Sarah E. The American Promise: a History of the United States, Value Edition, Combined Volume. 8th edition. (Kindle Locations 13795-13835). Bedford/St. Martin's. Kindle Edition. Textbook.
- Shafritz, Jay M. et al. Personnel Management in Government: Politics and Process (2001), textbook
- Skowronek, Stephen. Building a New American State: The Expansion of National Administrative Capacity, 1877–1920 (1982).
- Summers, Mark W. The Plundering Generation: Corruption and the Crisis of the Union, 1849–1861 (1987).
- Van Riper, Paul P. History of the United States Civil Service (1958).
- Weber J., "Leonard Dupee White and Public Administration", Journal of Management History, Volume 2, Number 2, February 1996, pp. 41–64
- White, Leonard D. The Federalists: a Study in Administrative History, 1956.
- White, Leonard D. The Jeffersonians: a Study in Administrative History (1952)
- White, Leonard D. The Jacksonians: a Study in Administrative History online at ACLS e-books (1954)
- White, Leonard D. The Republican Era, 1869–1901 a Study in Administrative History, 1958 online at ACLS e-books
- White, Richard D., Jr. Roosevelt the Reformer: Theodore Roosevelt as Civil Service Commissioner, 1889–1895. (2003). 264 pp.
