= USS Hale =

USS Hale may refer to the following ships of the United States Navy:

- USS Hale (DD-133), a Wickes-class destroyer launched in 1919; transferred to the Royal Navy as HMS Caldwell (I20), 1940; to the Royal Canadian Navy, 1942; scrapped in 1944
- USS Hale (DD-642), a Fletcher-class destroyer launched in 1943; transferred to Colombia as ARC Antioquia (DD-01), 1961; struck in 1973 and scrapped

== See also ==
- USS E. B. Hale (1861)
- USS Nathan Hale (SSBN-623)
- USS Roy O. Hale (DE-336)
