= Half-Breeds (politics) =

Political faction in the United States

- Leader: George Frisbie Hoar; Rutherford B. Hayes; William A. Wheeler; John Sherman; George W. McCrary; Stanley Matthews; Henry L. Dawes; Henry W. Blair; George F. Edmunds; William M. Evarts; John Davis Long; James A. Garfield (Note: This member was a convert into the Half-Breed faction as opposed to being an original member since the Hayes era.); James G. Blaine; Justin Smith Morrill; William E. Chandler; William H. Robertson
- Founded: c. 1877
- Dissolved: c. 1890
- Preceded by: Moderate faction of the Republican Party
- Ideology: Anti-corruption; Anti-Grantism; Classical liberalism; Pro-industry; Protectionism; Pro-civil service reform; Pro-merit system; Anti-spoils system; Radical Liberalism; Reformism
- National affiliation: Republican Party; Blaine faction (1880)

The "Half-Breeds" were a Political faction of the United States Republican Party in the late 19th century. The Half-Breeds were a comparably moderate group, described as liberal, and were the opponents of the Stalwarts, the other main faction of the Republican Party. The main issue that divided the Stalwarts and the Half-Breeds was political patronage. The Stalwarts were in favor of political machines and spoils system-style patronage, while the Half-Breeds, later led by Maine senator James G. Blaine, were in favor of civil service reform and a merit system. The epithet "Half-Breed" was invented in derision by the Stalwarts to denote those whom they perceived as being "only half Republican".

The Blaine faction in the context of the Hayes era is commonly attributed as the congressional Half-Breeds, although this is erroneous. Blaine's political organization during this time formed an informal coalition with the Stalwarts in opposition towards aspects of the Hayes administration.

In spite of the faction's broad advocacy of civil service reform in their decries of corruption, several members were known to have engaged in illicit practices for personal or partisan benefits. Congressman and Senator Henry L. Dawes was revealed as a stockholder for Crédit Mobilier amidst the scandal;

== Background ==
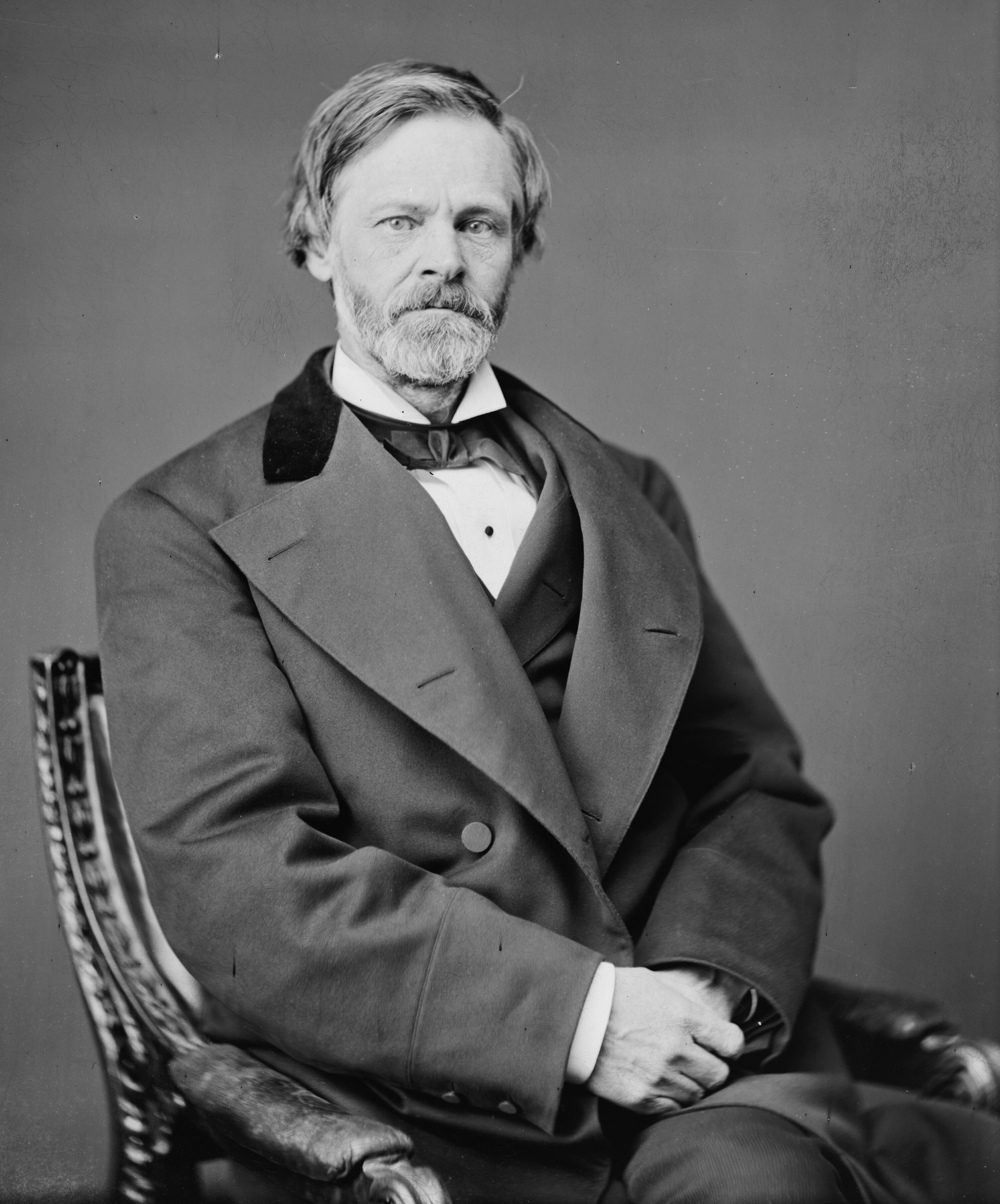
John Sherman, member of the Moderate Republicans who would join the congressional Half-Breeds

During the American Civil War, President Abraham Lincoln's policies pertaining to the Union Army were criticized by Radical Republicans as too lenient against the South. This powerful GOP bloc which included Henry Winter Davis, Benjamin Wade, Thaddeus Stevens, and Charles Sumner continuously criticized Lincoln for failing to advance as efficiently as possible, and the president's more staunch supporters were the Moderate Republicans. (Note: "Moderate" in this specific context refers to the degree of eagerness in war policy without regard to overall political ideology; Lincoln in this sense was "moderate" in terms of leading the Union during the Civil War.)

The "moderate" Republicans Lincoln led were at odds with the Radicals and favored more conciliatory Reconstruction policies. Their ranks would later be joined during the Johnson presidency by some former Radical Republicans who were "reformers," including Sumner, Carl Schurz, Horace Greeley, and Lyman Trumbull.

Republican congressman Thomas A. Jenckes of Rhode Island during the presidency of Ulysses S. Grant introduced legislation pushing for mild civil service reform, which was enacted. Jenckes, who disregarded the plight of Southern blacks facing danger from Democratic white supremacist terrorists such as the Ku Klux Klan, left office before the congressional "Half-Breeds" obtained its reputation as a functioning bloc, though can be viewed as a forerunner to the faction.

== Ideology and leadership ==
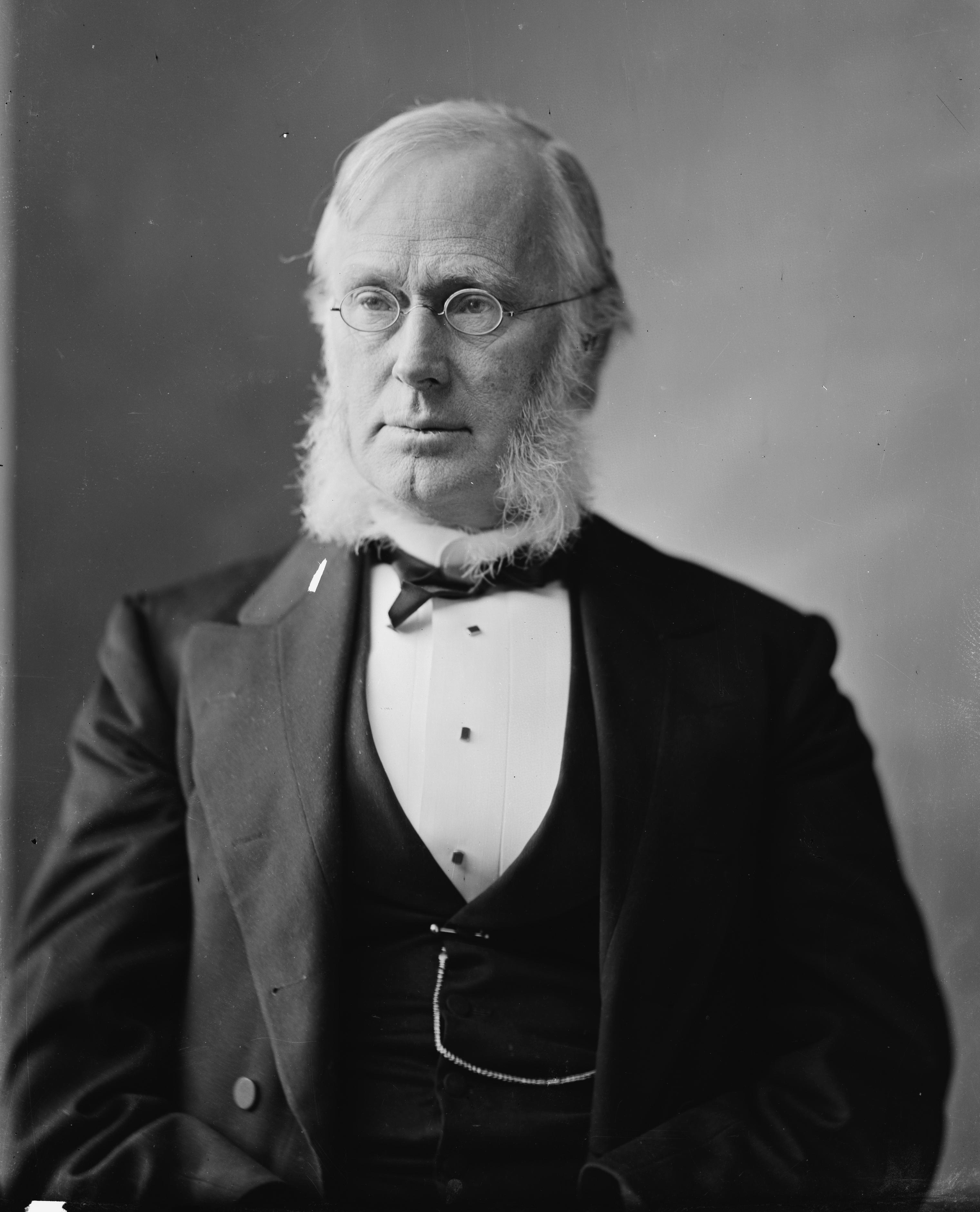
George Frisbie Hoar, leading member of the Half-Breed ranks from Massachusetts

Although the Half-Breeds had no rigid organization as a congressional bloc and were viewed as merely a group of disgruntled Blaine supporters promoting factionalism, their influence proved to be highly significant. They viewed the term attributed negatively to them as either badges of honor or an identifying mark, a parallel to the Democratic Party's embracing of the donkey as their symbol after Jacksonian Democrats were dubbed "jackasses."

When accused of lacking sufficient political loyalty to the Republican Party, Half-Breeds would often accuse Stalwarts of holding excessive allegiance to their associated political machines and patronage. The group's ambitions, aside from moderate civil service reform, included advocating industrial strength, railroad interests, higher protective tariffs, expanding markets abroad, and a business-friendly currency system on the national level.

According to Professor Richard E. Welch Jr., the Half-Breeds were "party regulars" who "damned" bolters, were not uniformly independent in political nature nor advocates of the spoils system, and more intelligent than personal in comparison to the Stalwarts.

James G. Blaine, who led the faction in 1880, was personally opposed to civil service reform and opposed questionable policies pushed by President Hayes. He emerged as one of its main members largely due to sheer contempt for Stalwart Roscoe Conkling, pertaining to a rivalry dating back to the 1860s.

Many sources published in the contemporary era tend to attribute leadership of the Half-Breeds to Blaine and sometimes even suggest that Blaine himself was a supporter of civil service reform, which is misleading and erroneous. Per the writings of Professor Welch:

By the middle of the Hayes's administration certain politicians were already representative of the goals and prejudices of Half-Breed Republicanism. Not James G. Blaine—who at this point represented a particular wing of the Stalwarts and became a Half-Breed only with the campaign of 1880—but men like Hayes, Hoar, George Edmunds, William Wheeler, Stanley Matthews, Henry Blair, William Evarts, George McCrary, Henry Dawes, and John Sherman.

— Welch, p. 91

Viewpoints on civil rights varied among members of the Half-Breed faction. Some such as Hayes, Evarts, McCrary and Wheeler were willing to entirely abandon Reconstruction efforts and surrender the South to the Redeemers, while the more pro-civil rights Hoar and Blair favored an alternative to military Reconstruction in the form of increased public education funding to elevate a large percentage of Southern blacks from illiteracy.

== Timeline ==
=== GOP campaign, 1876 ===
During the 1876 presidential election, the Republican National Convention nominated Rutherford Hayes and William Wheeler to head the party ticket for the general election. Both Hayes and Wheeler sought to peel away Democrat support from the South by voicing conciliatory tones, attempting to draw support from upper-class old Southern Whigs who eventually joined the Democratic Party when the Whig Party collapsed.

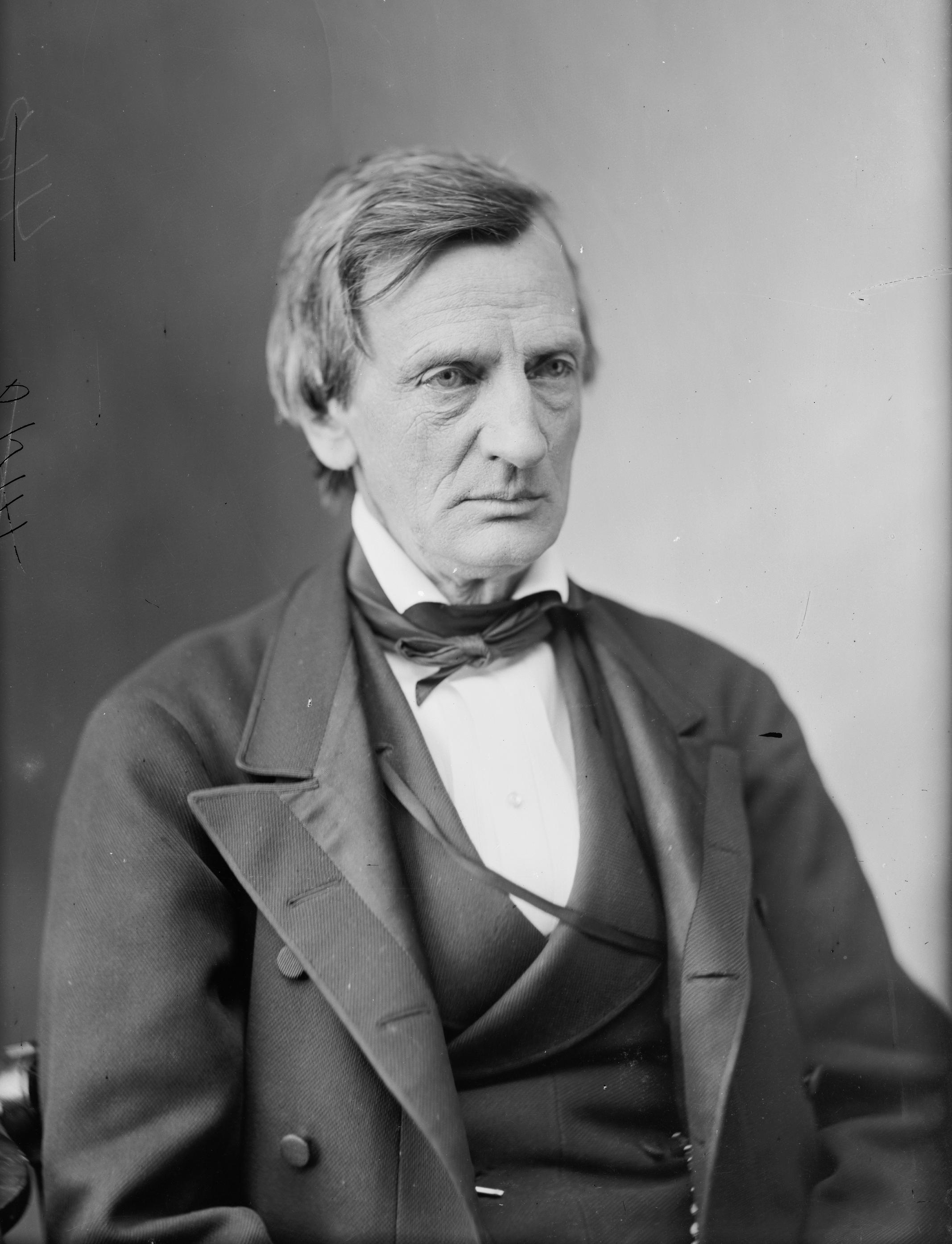
William M. Evarts, a Half-Breed involved in the Compromise of 1877

Frederick Douglass asked at the party convention whether delegates would continue to uphold the constitutional rights of blacks, or if they intended to "get along without the vote of the black man in the South." Hayes and Wheeler chose the latter.

=== Hayes presidency ===
The Compromise of 1877 that resolved the controversies and disputes of the 1876 presidential election gave the White House to Hayes over Bourbon Democrat opponent Samuel J. Tilden. Soon after taking office, Hayes abandoned his past Radical Republicanism and along with Secretary of War George W. McCrary pulled federal troops from the Southern states of South Carolina and Louisiana, all but ensuring a Jim Crow Democrat takeover of the region.

President Hayes also pushed for civil service reform, aligning himself with the Half-Breeds. Seeking to curb the powers of Conkling and the latter's powerful New York political machine, Hayes removed a number of the senator's allies from the state's patronage system.

==== Setback and rebuke ====
The Collector of the Port of New York was a highly prized position, as the port functioned as a center of international trade between the United States and other countries. Hayes vainly attempted to wrest control of appointments to the position from the Conkling machine to no avail, twice failing to appoint a like-minded political figure due to the successful congressional blockade initiated by the Stalwarts.

Soon afterwards, Conkling appointed close ally and future president Chester A. Arthur to the post of Collector. Arthur proved to be corrupt, giving away jobs only on the basis of party affiliation with no regard for competence and qualifications. Hayes then investigated the Customs House, and along with John Sherman (the Secretary of the Treasury) removed Arthur from the position.

==== Blaine supporters temporarily join Stalwarts against Hayes ====
Hayes' decision to remove Arthur from the New York Customs House angered not only Stalwarts but even elicited the criticism of the Blaine faction, who questioned the wisdom of the action and had earlier stood side-by-side with the president. Any remaining hopes of a party renomination for Hayes in the 1880 presidential election depended on support from potential Blaine supporters. With this needed bolstering evaporating, he faced no chance of becoming the Republican nominee for the race. The Blaine organization instead turned to advocate a nomination of their leader, Senator Blaine.

During the Hayes years, Blaine frequently joined Stalwarts in voting against the president's nominees, including Theodore Roosevelt Sr., Edwin Atkins Merritt, and Silas W. Burt. The nomination of Roosevelt Sr. was supported by Democrats and several Half-Breed leaders such as Hoar, but was defeated by the majority of Republicans under the leadership of Conkling.

=== 1880 United States presidential election ===
In the 1880 Republican National Convention, the Stalwart candidate, former president Ulysses S. Grant, was pitted against James G. Blaine for the party nomination. Grant's campaign was led by Stalwart leaders John A. Logan of Illinois, Simon Cameron and his son J. Donald Cameron of Pennsylvania, and Roscoe Conkling of New York, the state with the deepest split between Stalwarts and Half-Breeds. Despite Conkling's attempts at imposing a unit-rule in the Republican National Convention by which a state's votes would be grouped together for only one candidate, a number of Stalwarts went against him by vocalizing their support for Blaine. Half-Breeds and the Blaine faction united to defeat the unit-rule in a vote, and elected Half-Breed George Frisbie Hoar to the position as temporary chairman of the convention. Hoar was later appointed as permanent chairman of the convention.

Both sides knew there was no chance of victory for either candidate, and the Half-Breeds chose James Garfield as a compromise candidate. Garfield won the party's nomination on the thirty-sixth ballot, and subsequently emerged victorious in the general election narrowly.

=== Garfield Administrations, assassination, aftermath ===
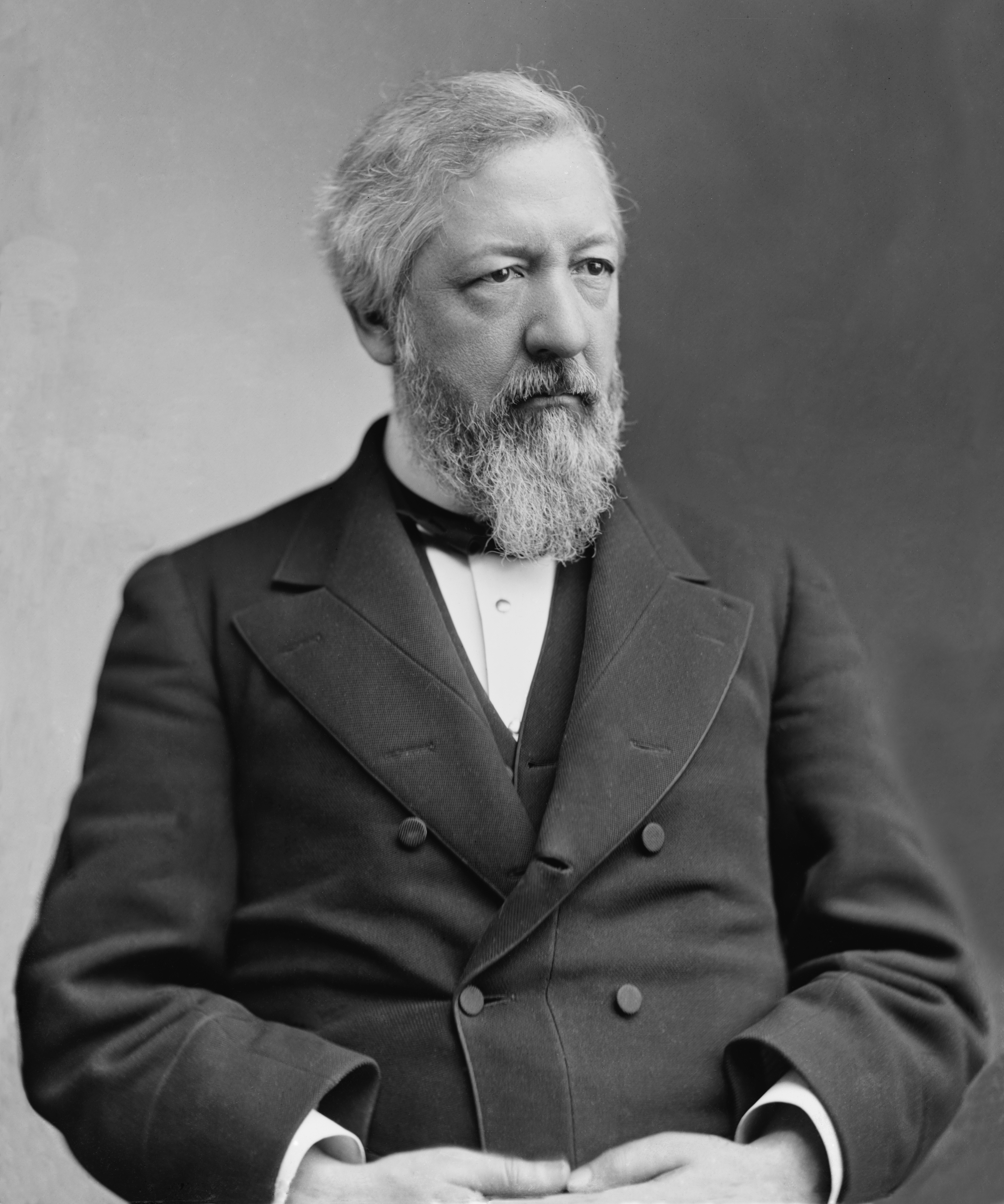
Senator James G. Blaine, a convert into the Half-Breeds

Blaine was chosen as Garfield's Secretary of State, and carried heavy influence over the political appointments Garfield issued for congressional approval. After Garfield was assassinated by Charles J. Guiteau, a self-professed Stalwart, who proclaimed, "I am a Stalwart of the Stalwarts and Arthur will be President," the new Stalwart president Chester A. Arthur surprised those in his own faction by promoting civil service reform and issuing government jobs based on a merit system.

The Half-Breeds put through Congress the Pendleton Civil Service Reform Act (authored by Democrat George H. Pendleton), and Arthur signed the bill into law on January 16, 1883. The act put an end to the spoils system, at least symbolically, placing a significant number of federal employees under the merit system and putting the government on the road to true reform. The act also set up the United States Civil Service Commission, banished political tests, denied jobs to alcoholics and created competitive measures for some federal positions.

All Senate Republicans present voted for the Pendleton Act, in addition to all but seven House Republicans. The primary opposition thus came from Democrats who likely voted against it due to the party's Jacksonian roots. (Note: The spoils system was originally a principle of the Jacksonian Democrats.) The legislation passed both houses of Congress and was signed into law by President Arthur.

The Pendleton Act notably did not elicit enthusiastic support from Half-Breed Blaine, who continued his personal antipathy towards civil service reform.

=== 1884: Mugwumps replace Half-Breeds as role of "reformer" ===
In the 1884 presidential election, President Arthur found insufficient support for his re-election campaign, and faced a formidable challenge from Blaine. Reformers, including future president Theodore Roosevelt, pushed again to nominate Edmunds. However, the Vermont senator had no intention of seeking the presidency, stating to Hoar in a conversation at some point:

If I know myself I have no desire to be president . . . I would say so in a public letter but I suppose the chances of my nomination are so slight that it might seem ridiculous to decline.

— Edmunds in a conversation with Hoar, 1884

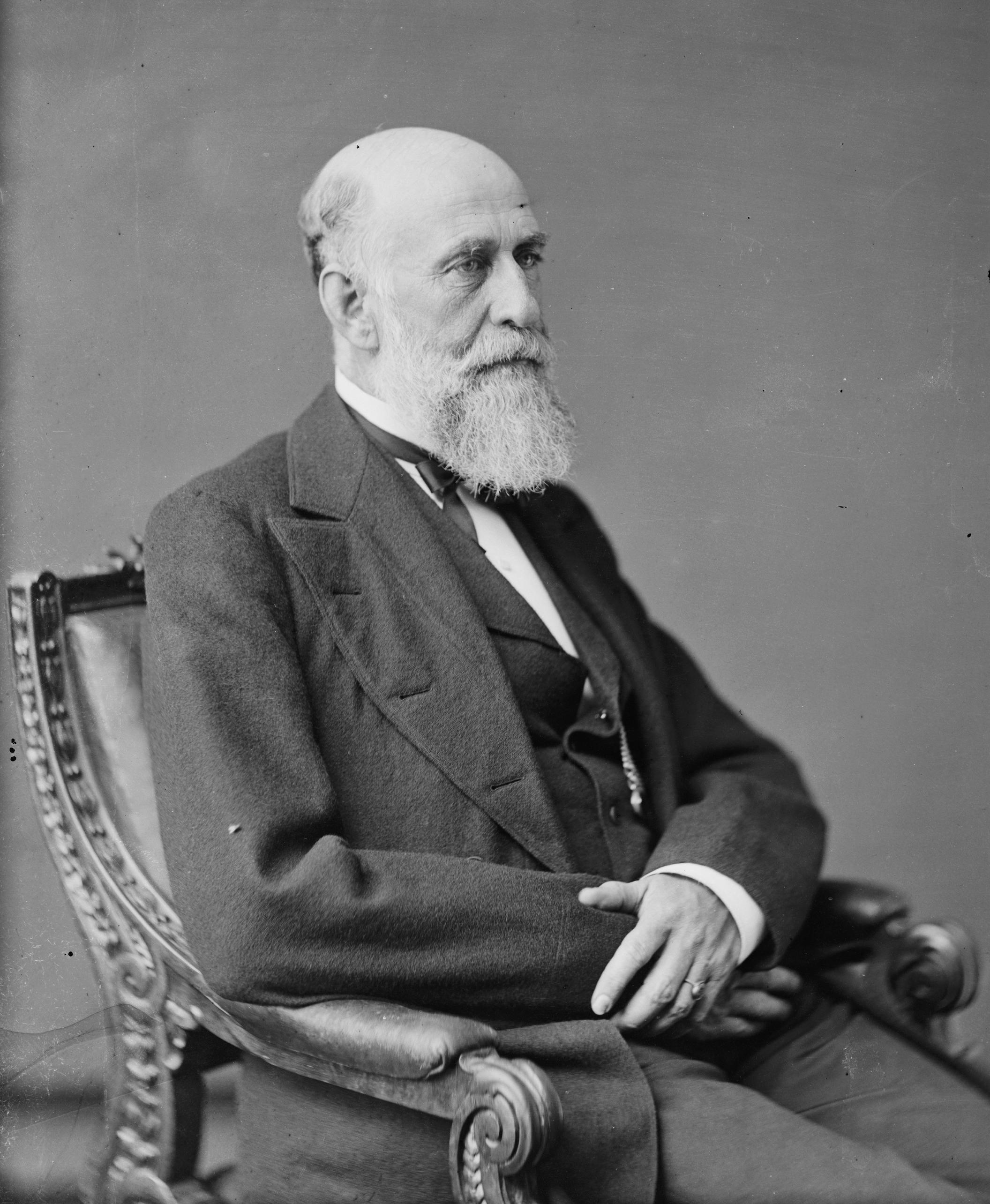
Half-Breed Edmunds refused to support Blaine in 1884.

The Republican National Convention ultimately nominated Half-Breed Blaine and former Stalwart John A. Logan of Illinois to head the party ticket. With both factions appeased, the majority of Republicans on both sides actively organized the GOP campaign.

Due to both Blaine and Logan having a record of favoring the spoils system over civil service reform, "reformers" in the Mugwump faction such as political cartoonist Thomas Nast of Harper's Weekly opposed the party ticket and instead supported the pro-civil service reform Bourbon Democrat nominee, Grover Cleveland. Former Liberal Republican Party figure Lyman Trumbull, known in part for previously voting against convicting Andrew Johnson, denounced the Blaine/Logan ticket and stated that their potential victory would lead to "partisanship, abuses, and corruption." The Mugwumps in effect replaced the role of the Half-Breeds as advocates of reform who broke from party traditions.

Logan's presence on the party ticket helped draw enthusiastic support from black people due to his record of staunchly advocating for civil rights. This included the backing of abolitionist and renowned black leader Frederick Douglass. Most Half-Breeds were skeptical of Logan, though supported the ticket out of party unity; this included Rutherford Hayes, who called the nomination a "blunder and misfortune" though viewed a Democrat victory as a "serious calamity." Half-Breed John Sherman expressed similar sentiment, calling Logan "coarse, suspicious, revengeful" yet voicing support for the GOP ticket.

Not all Half-Breeds supported the ticket; Sen. George F. Edmunds, who believed a true Half-Breed must support civil service reform and thus distrusted Blaine, declined to give the pair any support throughout the campaign. He viewed his Maine colleague as a mere selfish opportunist and refused to support the pair, writing:

It is my deliberate opinion that Senator Blaine acts as the attorney of Jay Gould. Whenever Mr. [Allen G.] Thurman and I have settled upon legislation to bring the Pacific Railroad to terms of equity with the government, up has jumped Mr. James G. Blaine musket in hand, from behind the breastworks of Jay Gould's lobby to fire in our faces.

— Edmunds, 1884

Stalwart leader Conkling, who by this time retired from political life, still maintained his personal disdain for Blaine to such an extent that even Logan's presence on the ticket did not prompt him to campaign for the pair. When asked to bolster Blaine, he bluntly responded:

I do not engage in criminal practice.

— Conkling, 1884

In the general election, the Blaine/Logan ticket lost to Cleveland, particularly failing to carry the state of New York due to Samuel D. Burchard, a Protestant minister associated with Blaine who attacked the Democrats as the party of "rum, Romanism, and rebellion." (Note: Rum was a reference to saloon keepers, "Romanism" meant Catholicism, and "rebellion" referred to the Confederacy.) The remark was seized by Democrats, who riled up Irish Catholics to turn out against the Republicans. Following the results, Grand Army of the Republic leader Mortimer D. Leggett stated:

There would now be no doubt about the result if our ticket had been the other end up.

— Leggett, leader of the G.A.R.

The Half-Breed and Stalwart factions both dissolved towards the end of the 1880s.

== See also ==
- Republican In Name Only, a contemporary designation for Republican Party members deemed insufficiently loyal to the party or insufficiently conservative in their views
