= Stalwarts (politics) =

Faction of the U.S. Republican Party, 1870s–1880s

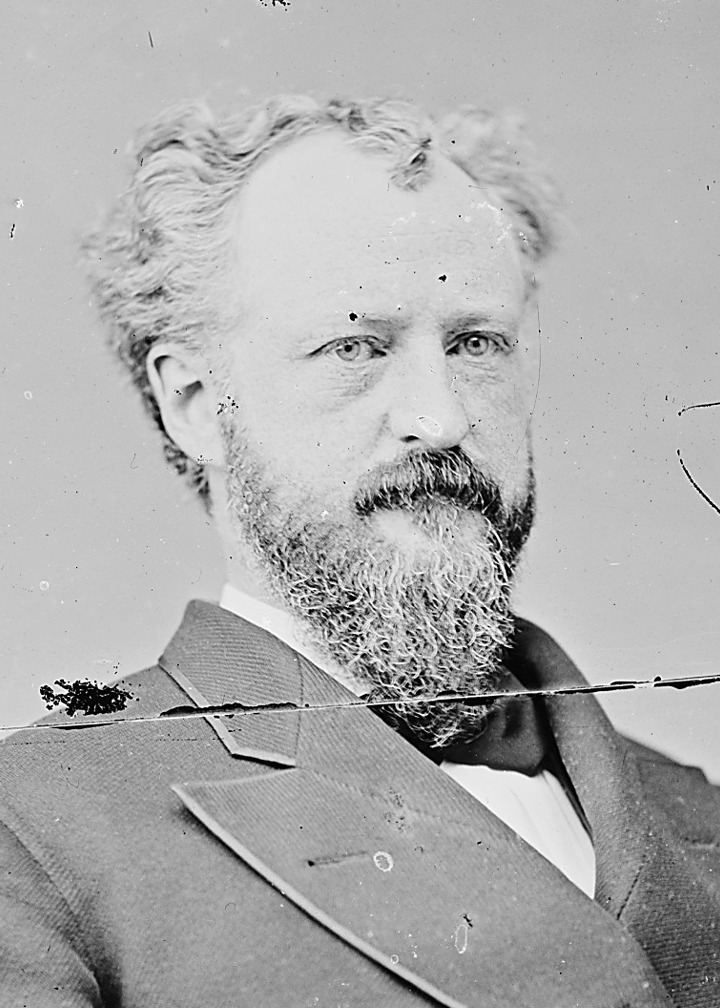
Senator Roscoe Conkling, leader of the Stalwarts

The Stalwarts were a faction of the Republican Party that existed briefly in the United States during Reconstruction and the Gilded Age during the 1870s and 1880s. Led by U.S. senator Roscoe Conkling—also known as "Lord Roscoe"—Stalwarts were sometimes called Conklingites. Other notable Stalwarts included Benjamin Wade, Charles J. Folger, George C. Gorham, Chester A. Arthur, Thomas C. Platt, and Leonidas C. Houk. The faction favored Ulysses S. Grant, the eighteenth president of the United States (1869–1877), running for a third term in the 1880 United States presidential election.

The designation of "Stalwart" to describe the faction was coined by James G. Blaine, who would later lead the rival "Half-Breed" faction during the Garfield administration. Blaine and his political organization formed an informal coalition with the Stalwarts during the presidency of Rutherford B. Hayes, supporting patronage and advocating on behalf of Southern blacks. The Maine Senator also frequently joined Stalwarts in voting against nominations of reformers by President Hayes who received the support of Democrats and staunch Half-Breed Republicans. Blaine applied the term to commend Conkling's faction as devoted loyalists to the Republican Party's principles.

Stalwarts were the traditional "Old Guard" Republicans, who advocated for the civil rights of African-Americans and opposed Rutherford B. Hayes's efforts to enact civil service reform. They were pitted against the "Half-Breeds" (classically liberal moderates) for control of the Republican Party. The most prominent issue between Stalwarts and Half-Breeds was patronage. The Half-Breeds worked to enact moderate civil service reform, and finally helped pass the Pendleton Civil Service Reform Act. This was signed by Arthur, who became President after the assassination of James A. Garfield, a Half-Breed. Stalwarts favored traditional machine politics.

== Background ==
During the American Civil War and afterwards, congressional Radical Republicans feuded with Conservative Republicans who generally opposed efforts by Radical Republicans to rebuild the Southern U.S. under an economically mobile, free-market system and thrived politically on antipathy towards civil rights and black suffrage, and with Moderate Republicans, who were less enthusiastic than Radical Republicans about Black suffrage even though they otherwise embraced civil equality and the expansion of federal authority during the American Civil War.

Over time, the power of the Radical Republicans disintegrated as members became disenchanted with the associated corruption during the presidency of Ulysses S. Grant. Many remaining Radicals, unwavering in their tactic of "waving the bloody shirt" and their defense of black civil rights, formed the Stalwarts, including but not limited to Roscoe Conkling, Frederick T. Frelinghuysen, John A. Logan, Zachariah Chandler, Benjamin Butler, William B. Allison, Benjamin Wade, and Oliver P. Morton.

== Characteristics ==
The remedy of the Stalwarts was drastic enough. Their program was the return to the radicalism of Thaddeus Stevens and Charles Sumner, with no quarter shown to unrepentant rebels or their allies among the Northern Democrats or their new recruits from the muddle-headed, mushy-hearted “liberals” in the Republican fold. Their instrument was the machine, well oiled with patronage, turning out rewards for the regulars and punishments for the recalcitrants, manned by reliable manipulators who knew which side their bread was buttered on and wanted no interference from that “man milliner Curtis” or any other visionary “snivel service” reformers. The candidate must be no goody-goody like “Granny Hayes,” but a strong, red-blooded man who identified patriotism with Republicanism and would stand no nonsense from “traitors” to the country or to the party. That man they found in General Grant—not the generous Grant of Appomattox, but the “tawdry Caesar” of the Enforcement Acts.

— David Saville Muzzey

The Stalwarts were mostly identifiable through their support of the presidency and re-election of Ulysses S. Grant. The 1880 Republican National Convention was the event in which the group participated most prominently. Of the Stalwarts present, most were from former Confederate states, with others being from New York, Illinois, and Pennsylvania, home to some prominent Republican leaders. Deemed as loyalists to the policies pursued under the Grant administration, they stood in favor of hard money, high tariffs, waving the bloody shirt, and Southern Republicanism led by freedmen and carpetbaggers.

Although commonly described as "conservative", Stalwarts were not uniformly bound on ideology aside from their advocacy of spoils system politics and African-American civil rights. Some members, including John A. Logan, broke with the standard Republican Party position on the issue of protective tariffs and favored lower rates.

Stalwarts were more cautious in policy than non-Stalwarts, preferring to avoid controversial policies popular with other Republicans, such as a higher protective tariff. This caution led the Stalwarts to support the nomination of Grant, a popular former president, at the 1880 Republican National Convention.

== Hayes presidency ==
=== Conkling rebukes Hayes in Port Collector fight ===
The Collector of the Port of New York was a significant political position, with the officeholder being able to control a central location of trade between the United States and other nations. New York had for many years hitherto, been managed by the patronage machine of Conkling, with opponents of the New York boss vying for control.

President Hayes attempted to wrest control of the Port from Conkling to no avail, twice picking his own political acolytes to the post only to have the nominations defeated in the Senate by the New York senator, who successfully rallied Republicans to his side. Among Hayes' earlier nominations to the post of New York Collector of Customs was Theodore Roosevelt Sr., the father of future president Theodore Roosevelt. The nomination of Roosevelt Sr. was defeated due to overwhelming Republican opposition in the U.S. Senate. The Stalwarts' opposition towards Roosevelt Sr. was joined by James G. Blaine, while Half-Breeds George F. Hoar and Stanley Matthews voted for the nomination.

Conkling later managed to secure the position of New York Customs House boss for close machine ally and future president Chester A. Arthur.

=== Hayes and Sherman fire Arthur ===
Arthur's tenure was marked with corruption and extensive preference of party loyalties over qualifications. He was known to have turned a blind eye to corruption in the New York Customs House, in addition to hiring thousands of Republicans for government jobs on the mere basis of partisan affiliation.

Following an investigation of the Customs House in 1877, President Hayes and Secretary of the Treasury John Sherman, a Half-Breed, fired Arthur the following year. This decision was criticized even by congressional members of the Blaine faction, who began to distance themselves from Hayes. The Hayes administration subsequently emerged victorious in several intraparty battles, successfully nominating Edwin Atkins Merritt and Silas W. Burt to prominent positions in New York. Although Republican opposition towards Hayes considerably eroded in contrast to the defeat of Roosevelt Sr.'s nomination, the Stalwarts and Blaine faction remained, at this point, informally united in persistent antipathy towards the president's reform advocacy.

== 1880 Republican National Convention ==
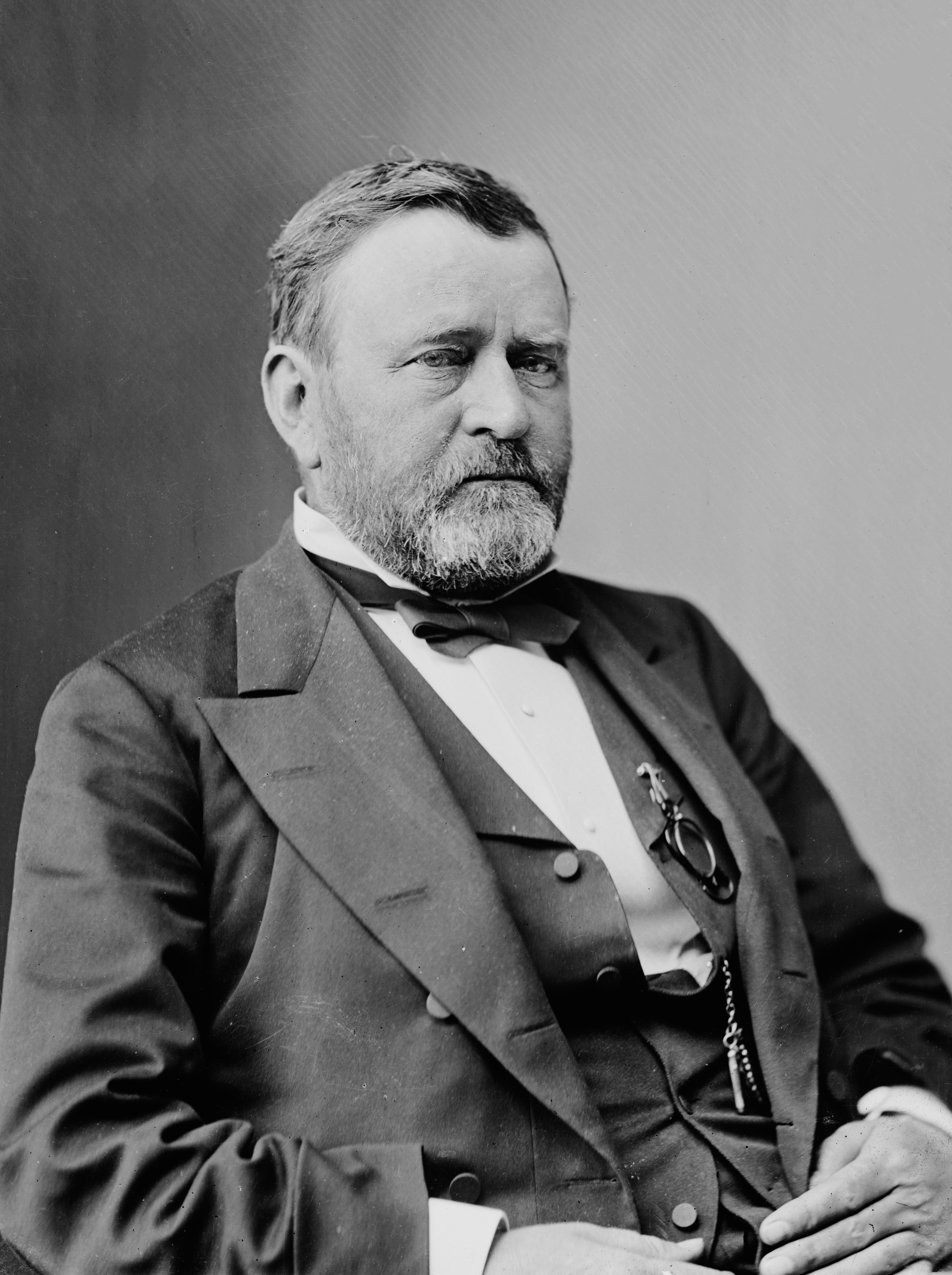
Ulysses S. Grant, who Stalwarts supported in 1880

In 1880, Stalwarts led by Conkling, Logan, and Simon Cameron fiercely advocated nominating former president Ulysses S. Grant for a non-consecutive, third presidential term. The Half-Breeds advocated the nomination of Senator George F. Edmunds of Vermont, while the Blaine faction sought a presidential term for James G. Blaine. Although Grant had previously pushed for some degree of civil service reform as president, he became disenchanted with Hayes' efforts to effectively dismantle the Stalwarts' patronage machines. Conkling, who previously was a close ally to Grant during the latter's presidency, once again became a right-hand man.

The Stalwarts, in a bid for power within their own party in spite of their loss of power due to the rise in popularity of the Democratic Party, stubbornly supported the nomination of Ulysses S. Grant, who, if elected, would be serving a third, non-consecutive term. Bitter factionalism emerged, primarily between the Conkling and Blaine wings of the party. Chief allies of Blaine, William P. Frye and Eugene Hale, proved unable to thoroughly debate the shrewd Conkling, who "humiliated" Frye in a manner deemed "half sneer and half insult."

A stalemate ensued between the Half-Breeds, Blaine faction, and the Stalwarts, so a compromise was struck by the Blaine faction and supporters of John Sherman to nominate James A. Garfield, with Chester A. Arthur, former Collector of the Port of New York, as his running mate, to satisfy the Stalwarts and thereby ensure their support for the general election. For the vice presidential pick, Garfield at first proposed nominating Secretary of the Treasury John Sherman, a staunch Half-Breed, Moderate Republican, and supporter of civil service reform who Stalwarts loathed. In an appeal to party unity for both factions to be somewhat pleased, Conkling ally Chester "Chet" Arthur became Garfield's running mate, to the horror of Half-Breeds who pejoratively dubbed him as Conkling's "creature." The pair narrowly would win the general election in November that year.

== Decline ==
After the Republican victory in November 1880, President Garfield and Conkling fought bitterly and publicly over patronage in Conkling's home state of New York. Garfield, with assistance and advice from Blaine, won the battle, and Conkling and Platt resigned from the Senate, convinced that they would be easily re-elected by the New York legislature. However, Garfield was shot by a self-proclaimed "Stalwart of the Stalwarts", Charles J. Guiteau, on July 2, 1881, and Arthur became President of the United States upon Garfield's death on September 19, 1881. The shock of the assassination broke both Conkling's power and that of the Stalwarts, and Conkling's former protege Arthur helped to create civil service reforms in his term, in part because he felt that he had to follow up on and finish Garfield's work.

The Pendleton Act passed with no Senate Republican opposition. Remaining Senate Stalwarts, including John A. Logan, William B. Allison, J. Donald Cameron, voted for passage. Only seven House Republicans (being Benjamin F. Marsh, James S. Robinson, Robert Smalls, William Robert Moore, Orlando Hubbs, John Robert Thomas, and George Washington Steele) voted against passage of the Pendleton Act.

In the 1884 United States presidential election, Conkling and Platt opposed the Republican Party renomination of their former ally Arthur. The nomination went to James G. Blaine, whom Conkling continued loathing and to whom he refused to lend any support in spite of the vice-presidential selection going to Stalwart John A. Logan. When asked to campaign for the ticket, Conkling remarked: "I don't engage in criminal practice."

In some states such as Wisconsin, the term "stalwart" continued to be used in reference to the conservative element of those states' Republican parties in contrast to the progressive elements, well into the 1930s.

== General sources ==
- Foner, Eric (1988). Reconstruction: America's Unfinished Revolution, 1863–1877. New York: Harper & Row.
- Jones, James Pickett (2001). John A. Logan: Stalwart Republican from Illinois. SIU Press. ISBN 9780809323890. Archived from the original on January 18, 2023.
- Welch, Richard E. Jr. (1971). George Frisbie Hoar and the Half-Breed Republicans. Harvard University Press.
