= 1908–09 United States Senate elections =

- January 14, 1908 – July 6, 1909
- Class 3

31 of the 92 seats in the U.S. Senate 47 seats needed for a majority
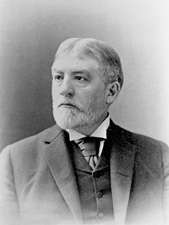

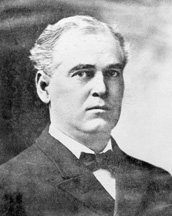
	Majority party	Minority party
Leader	Eugene Hale (Note: as Republican Conference chairman) (retired)	Charles Culberson (Note: as Democratic Conference chairman) (retired)
Party	Republican	Democratic
Leader since	March 4, 1907	March 4, 1903
Leader's seat	Maine	Texas
Seats before	61	31
Seats won	16	13
Seats after	60	32
Seat change	▼1	▲1
Seats up	18	13
- Results of the elections: Democratic gain Democratic hold Republican gain Republican hold
Majority conference chairman before election
William B. Allison
Republican
Elected Majority conference chairman
Eugene Hale
Republican

The 1908–09 United States Senate elections were held on various dates in various states. As these U.S. Senate elections were prior to the ratification of the Seventeenth Amendment in 1913, senators were primarily chosen by state legislatures. Senators were elected over a wide range of time throughout 1906 and 1907, and a seat may have been filled months late or remained vacant due to legislative deadlock. However, some states had already begun direct elections during this time. Oregon pioneered direct election and experimented with different measures over several years until it succeeded in 1907. Soon after, Nebraska followed suit and laid the foundation for other states to adopt measures reflecting the people's will. By 1912, as many as 29 states elected senators either as nominees of their party's primary or in conjunction with a general election.

The 31 Class 3 seats were up for election, as well as various special elections to fill vacancies or confirm appointments. The Republicans lost two seats overall.

In Illinois and Florida, the legislature failed to elect until after the beginning of the 61st Congress on March 4.

== Results summary ==
Senate party division, 61st Congress (1909–1911)

- Majority party: Republican (60 seats)
- Minority party: Democratic (32 seats)
- Other parties: 0
- Total seats: 92

== Change in composition ==
=== Before the elections ===
After the December 10, 1907, elections in Oklahoma and the January 21, 1908, special election in Rhode Island.

				D_{1}	D_{2}	D_{3}	D_{4}	D_{5}	D_{6}
D_{16}	D_{15}	D_{14}	D_{13}	D_{12}	D_{11}	D_{10}	D_{9}	D_{8}	D_{7}
D_{17}	D_{18}	D_{19} Ran	D_{20} Ran	D_{21} Ran	D_{22} Ran	D_{23} Ran	D_{24} Ran	D_{25} Ran	D_{26} Ran
R_{57} Ran	R_{58} Ran	R_{59} Ran	R_{60} Retired	R_{61} Retired	D_{31} Retired	D_{30} Retired	D_{29} Retired	D_{28} Unknown	D_{27} Ran
R_{56} Ran	R_{55} Ran	R_{54} Ran	R_{53} Ran	R_{52} Ran	R_{51} Ran	R_{50} Ran	R_{49} Ran	R_{48} Ran	R_{47} Ran
Majority →									R_{47} Ran
R_{37}	R_{38}	R_{39}	R_{40}	R_{41}	R_{42}	R_{43}	R_{44} Ran	R_{45} Ran	R_{46} Ran
R_{36}	R_{35}	R_{34}	R_{33}	R_{32}	R_{31}	R_{30}	R_{29}	R_{28}	R_{27}
R_{17}	R_{18}	R_{19}	R_{20}	R_{21}	R_{22}	R_{23}	R_{24}	R_{25}	R_{26}
R_{16}	R_{15}	R_{14}	R_{13}	R_{12}	R_{11}	R_{10}	R_{9}	R_{8}	R_{7}
				R_{1}	R_{2}	R_{3}	R_{4}	R_{5}	R_{6}

=== Result of the general elections ===
				D_{1}	D_{2}	D_{3}	D_{4}	D_{5}	D_{6}
D_{16}	D_{15}	D_{14}	D_{13}	D_{12}	D_{11}	D_{10}	D_{9}	D_{8}	D_{7}
D_{17}	D_{18}	D_{19} Re-elected	D_{20} Re-elected	D_{21} Re-elected	D_{22} Re-elected	D_{23} Re-elected	D_{24} Re-elected	D_{25} Re-elected	D_{26} Re-elected
R_{57} Hold	R_{58} Hold	R_{59} Gain	V_{1} R loss	V_{2} D loss	D_{31} Gain	D_{30} Gain	D_{29} Hold	D_{28} Hold	D_{27} Hold
R_{56} Hold	R_{55} Hold	R_{54} Hold	R_{53} Re-elected	R_{52} Re-elected	R_{51} Re-elected	R_{50} Re-elected	R_{49} Re-elected	R_{48} Re-elected	R_{47} Re-elected
Majority due to vacancies→									R_{46} Re-elected
R_{37}	R_{38}	R_{39}	R_{40}	R_{41}	R_{42}	R_{43}	R_{44} Re-elected	R_{45} Re-elected	R_{46} Re-elected
R_{36}	R_{35}	R_{34}	R_{33}	R_{32}	R_{31}	R_{30}	R_{29}	R_{28}	R_{27}
R_{17}	R_{18}	R_{19}	R_{20}	R_{21}	R_{22}	R_{23}	R_{24}	R_{25}	R_{26}
R_{16}	R_{15}	R_{14}	R_{13}	R_{12}	R_{11}	R_{10}	R_{9}	R_{8}	R_{7}
				R_{1}	R_{2}	R_{3}	R_{4}	R_{5}	R_{6}

Key:

D_{#}	Democratic
R_{#}	Republican
V_{#}	Vacant

== Race summaries ==
=== Special elections during the 60th Congress ===
In this election, the winner was seated in 1908 before March 4; ordered by state.

State	Incumbent			Results	Candidates
State	Senator	Party	Electoral history	Results	Candidates
Maryland (Class 3)	William P. Whyte	Democratic	1906 (appointed)	Interim appointee elected January 14, 1908.	▌ ✓ William P. Whyte (Democratic); [data missing]
Rhode Island (Class 2)	Vacant			Legislature had failed to elect. New senator elected January 21, 1908. Republican gain.	▌ ✓ George P. Wetmore (Republican) 68 votes; ▌Robert H. I. Goddard (Democratic) 36 votes; ▌Samuel P. Colt (Republican) 7 votes
South Carolina (Class 3)	Asbury Latimer	Democratic	1903	Incumbent died February 20, 1908. New senator elected March 6, 1908. Democratic hold. Winner did not run for the next term; see below.	▌ ✓ Frank B. Gary (Democratic); [data missing]
Maryland (Class 3)	William P. Whyte	Democratic	1906 (appointed); 1908	Incumbent died March 17, 1908. New senator elected March 24, 1908, having already been elected to the next term; see below. Democratic hold.	▌ ✓ John Walter Smith (Democratic); [data missing]
Vermont (Class 1)	John W. Stewart	Republican	1908 (appointed)	Incumbent retired. New senator elected October 20, 1908. Republican hold.	▌ ✓ Carroll S. Page (Republican) 229 votes; ▌Vernon A. Bullard (Democratic) 39 votes
Iowa (Class 3)	William B. Allison	Republican	1872; 1878; 1884; 1890; 1896; 1902	Incumbent renominated for the next term but died August 4, 1908. New senator elected November 24, 1908. Republican hold. Winner was later elected to the next term; see below.	▌ ✓ Albert B. Cummins (Republican); ▌Claude R. Porter (Democratic)

In this election, the winner was elected three years early, to be seated in the 62nd Congress starting March 4, 1911.

State	Incumbent			Results	Candidates
State	Senator	Party	Electoral history	Results	Candidates
Mississippi (Class 1)	Hernando Money	Democratic	1897 (appointed); 1899; 1904	Incumbent retired. New senator elected early January 21, 1908. Democratic hold.	▌ ✓ John Sharp Williams (Democratic); Unopposed

=== Races leading to the 61st Congress ===
In these regular elections, the winners were elected for the term beginning March 4, 1909; ordered by state.

All of the elections involved the Class 3 seats.

State	Incumbent			Results	Candidates
State	Senator	Party	Electoral history	Results	Candidates
Alabama	Edmund Pettus	Democratic	1903	Incumbent re-elected early January 22, 1907. Winner died July 27, 1907, and new senator elected early August 6.	January 22, 1907: ▌ ✓ Edmund Pettus (Democratic); Unopposed; August 6, 1907: ▌ ✓ Joseph F. Johnston (Democratic); Unopposed
Arkansas	James P. Clarke	Democratic	1903	Incumbent re-elected January 19, 1909.	▌ ✓ James P. Clarke (Democratic) 132; ▌H. H. Myers (Republican) 3
California	George C. Perkins	Republican	1895 (special); 1897; 1903	Incumbent re-elected January 12, 1909.	▌ ✓ George C. Perkins (Republican) 88; ▌ John O. Davis 19
Colorado	Henry M. Teller	Democratic	1885; 1891; 1897; 1903	Incumbent retired. New senator elected January 19, 1909. Democratic hold.	▌ ✓ Charles J. Hughes Jr. (Democratic) 73; ▌Joseph Helm (Republican) 17; ▌James W. McCreery (Republican) 7; ▌Robert W. Bonynge (Republican) 2
Connecticut	Frank B. Brandegee	Republican	1905 (special)	Incumbent re-elected January 19, 1909.	▌ ✓ Frank B. Brandegee (Republican) 201; ▌A. Heaton Robertson (Democratic) 52; ▌E. J. Hill (Republican) 14
Florida	William Milton	Democratic	1908 (appointed)	Interim appointee retired. Legislature failed to elect. Democratic loss. New senator appointed to start the term, and subsequently elected; see below.	[data missing]
Georgia	Alexander S. Clay	Democratic	1896; 1902	Incumbent re-elected July 6, 1909.	▌ ✓ Alexander S. Clay (Democratic); Unopposed
Idaho	Weldon Heyburn	Republican	1903	Incumbent re-elected January 12, 1909.	▌ ✓ Weldon B. Heyburn (Republican) 55; ▌Charles Stockslager (Democratic) 13; ▌W. W. Woods (Democratic) 6
Illinois	Albert J. Hopkins	Republican	1903	Incumbent renominated but couldn't secure the full support of his party. Legislature failed to elect. Republican loss. Seat remained vacant until May 26, 1909; see below.	▌Albert J. Hopkins (Republican); ▌George E. Foss (Republican); ▌William E. Mason (Republican); ▌Lawrence B. Stringer (Democratic); ▌Edward D. Shurtleff (Republican)
Indiana	James A. Hemenway	Republican	1905 (special)	Incumbent lost re-election. New senator elected January 20, 1909. Democratic gain.	▌ ✓ Benjamin F. Shively (Democratic) 82; ▌James H. Hemenway (Note: "James H. Hemenway" in source, probably "James A. Hemenway.") (Republican) 67
Iowa	Albert B. Cummins	Republican	1908	Incumbent re-elected January 19, 1909.	▌ ✓ Albert B. Cummins (Republican) 112; ▌Claude R. Porter (Democratic) 40
Kansas	Chester I. Long	Republican	1903	Incumbent lost renomination. New senator elected January 26, 1909. Republican hold.	▌ ✓ Joseph L. Bristow (Republican) 115; ▌Hugh P. Farrelly (Democratic) 56
Kentucky	James B. McCreary	Democratic	1902	Incumbent lost renomination. New senator elected February 28, 1908. Republican gain.	▌ ✓ William O. Bradley (Republican) 64; ▌J. C. W. Beckham (Democratic) 60; Scattering 3
Louisiana	Samuel D. McEnery	Democratic	1896; 1900 (early)	Incumbent re-elected May 19, 1908.	▌ ✓ Samuel D. McEnery (Democratic); Unopposed
Maryland	William P. Whyte	Democratic	1906 (appointed)	Interim appointee retired or lost election to the next term. New senator elected January 15, 1908. Democratic hold.	▌ ✓ John Walter Smith (Democratic); [data missing]
Missouri	William J. Stone	Democratic	1903	Incumbent re-elected January 20, 1909.	▌ ✓ William J. Stone (Democratic) 91 votes; ▌John C. McKinley (Republican) 84 votes
Nevada	Francis G. Newlands	Democratic	1903	Incumbent re-elected January 26, 1909, ratifying the popular selection made in 1908 state elections.	▌ ✓ Francis G. Newlands (Democratic); Unopposed less 1 vote In state election: ▌Francis G. Newlands (Democratic) 53.34%; ▌P. L. Flanigan (Republican) 38.37%; ▌T. C. Lutz (Socialist) 8.29%
New Hampshire	Jacob H. Gallinger	Republican	1891; 1897; 1903	Incumbent re-elected January 19, 1909.	▌ ✓ Jacob H. Gallinger (Republican) 258; ▌Oliver E. Branch (Democratic) 108
New York	Thomas C. Platt	Republican	1881; 1881 (resigned); 1897; 1903	Incumbent retired. New senator elected January 19, 1909. Republican hold.	▌ ✓ Elihu Root (Republican) 125; ▌Lewis S. Chanler (Democratic) 44
North Carolina	Lee S. Overman	Democratic	1903	Incumbent re-elected January 19, 1909.	▌ ✓ Lee S. Overman (Democratic) 126; ▌Spencer B. Adams (Republican) 34
North Dakota	Henry C. Hansbrough	Republican	1891; 1897; 1903	Incumbent lost renomination. New senator elected January 19, 1909. Republican hold.	▌ ✓ Martin N. Johnson (Republican) 126; ▌J. L. Cashel (Democratic) 14; ▌William E. Purcell (Democratic) 1
Ohio	Joseph B. Foraker	Republican	1896; 1902	Incumbent retired. New senator elected January 12, 1909. Republican hold.	▌ ✓ Theodore E. Burton (Republican) 89; ▌James E. Campbell (Democratic) 58; ▌Judson Harmon (Democratic) 1
Oklahoma	Thomas Gore	Democratic	1907	Incumbent re-elected January 19, 1909.	▌ ✓ Thomas Gore (Democratic) 96; ▌Dennis T. Flynn (Republican) 49
Oregon	Charles W. Fulton	Republican	1903	Incumbent lost re-election. New senator elected January 19, 1909, ratifying the popular selection made in 1908 state elections. Democratic gain.	▌ ✓ George E. Chamberlain (Democratic) 53; ▌Charles W. Fulton (Republican) 19; ▌Henry M. Coke (Republican) 17; ▌Robert S. Bean (Republican) 1 In state election: ▌George E. Chamberlain (Democratic) 46.65%; ▌Henry M. Coke (Republican) 45.30%; ▌J. Cooper (Socialist) 4.68%; ▌I. H. Amos (Prohibition) 3.37%
Pennsylvania	Boies Penrose	Republican	1897; 1903	Incumbent re-elected January 19, 1909.	▌ ✓ Boies Penrose (Republican) 198; ▌George M. Dimeling (Democratic) 42; ▌Edwin S. Stuart (Republican) 2; ▌John O. Sheatz (Republican) 1; ▌William Potter (Democratic) 1
South Carolina	Frank B. Gary	Democratic	1908 (special)	Incumbent retired. New senator elected January 26, 1909. Democratic hold.	▌ ✓ Ellison D. Smith (Democratic); Unopposed
South Dakota	Alfred B. Kittredge	Republican	1901 (appointed); 1903 (special); 1903	Incumbent lost renomination. New senator elected January 19, 1909. Republican hold.	▌ ✓ Coe I. Crawford (Republican) 134; ▌Andrew E. Lee (Democratic) 17
Utah	Reed Smoot	Republican	1903	Incumbent re-elected January 19, 1909.	▌ ✓ Reed Smoot (Republican) 61; ▌William H. King (Democratic) 2
Vermont	William P. Dillingham	Republican	1900 (special); 1902	Incumbent re-elected October 20, 1908.	▌ ✓ William P. Dillingham (Republican) 230; ▌Elisha May (Democratic) 38
Washington	Levi Ankeny	Republican	1903	Incumbent lost renomination. New senator elected January 19, 1909. Republican hold.	▌ ✓ Wesley L. Jones (Republican) 128; ▌George F. Cottrill (Democratic) 6; ▌William Goodyear (Democratic) 1
Wisconsin	Isaac Stephenson	Republican	1907 (special)	Incumbent re-elected January 27, 1909. Legislature failed to certify the result and ordered a new election. Incumbent was finally re-elected March 4, 1909, after many ballots.	▌ ✓ Isaac Stephenson (Republican) 51.22%; ▌Neal Brown (Democratic) 5.69%; ▌John J. Esch (Republican) 5.69%; ▌Henry A. Cooper (Republican) 4.07%; ▌Charles E. Estabrook (Republican) 3.25%; ▌Jacob Rummel (Socialist) 3.25%; ▌John Strange (Republican) 3.25%; others 23.58%

=== Elections during the 61st Congress ===
In these elections, the winners were elected in 1909 after March 4; ordered by date.

State	Incumbent			Results	Candidates
State	Senator	Party	Electoral history	Results	Candidates
Pennsylvania (Class 1)	Philander C. Knox	Republican	1904 (appointed); 1905 (special); 1905	Incumbent resigned March 4, 1909, to become U.S. Secretary of State. New senator elected March 16, 1909. Republican hold.	▌ ✓ George T. Oliver (Republican) 201; ▌Webster Grim (Democratic) 39; ▌Nathaniel Ewing (Republican) 1
Florida (Class 3)	Duncan U. Fletcher	Democratic	1909 (appointed)	Interim appointee elected April 20, 1909.	▌ ✓ Duncan U. Fletcher (Democratic); Unopposed
Illinois (Class 3)	Vacant			Legislature had failed to elect; see above. New senator elected May 26, 1909. Republican gain.	▌ ✓ William Lorimer (Republican) 108; ▌Albert J. Hopkins (Republican) 70; ▌Lawrence B. Stringer (Democratic) 23

== Maryland ==
=== Maryland (special) ===
1908 United States Senate special election in Maryland
- June 8, 1908

80 members of the Maryland General Assembly
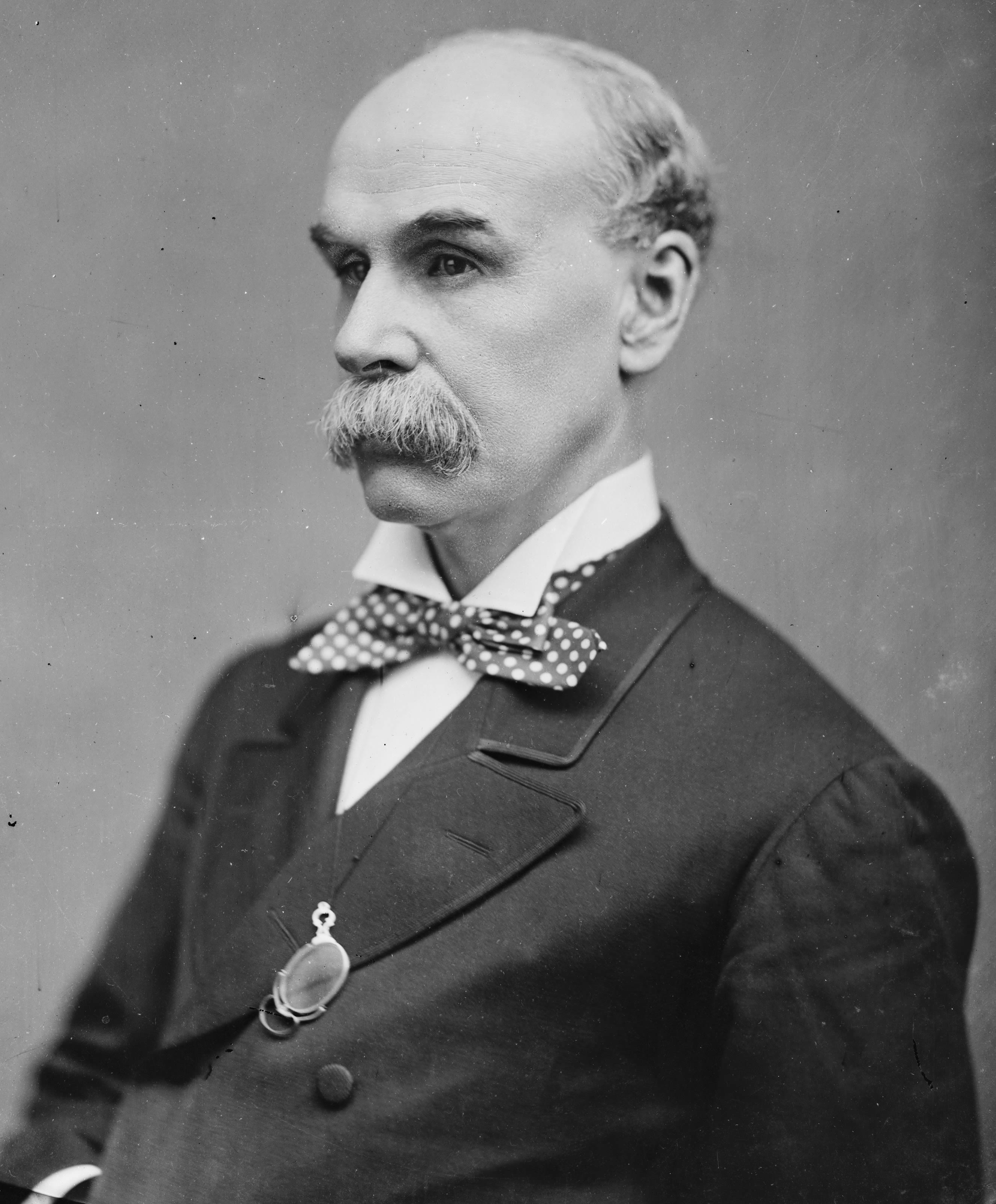
Candidate	William Pinkney Whyte
Party	Democratic
Legislative vote	-
Percentage	-%

William Pinkney Whyte was elected by an unknown margin, for the Class 3 seat.

=== Maryland (regular) ===
1908 United States Senate election in Maryland
- November 3, 1908

80 members of the Maryland General Assembly
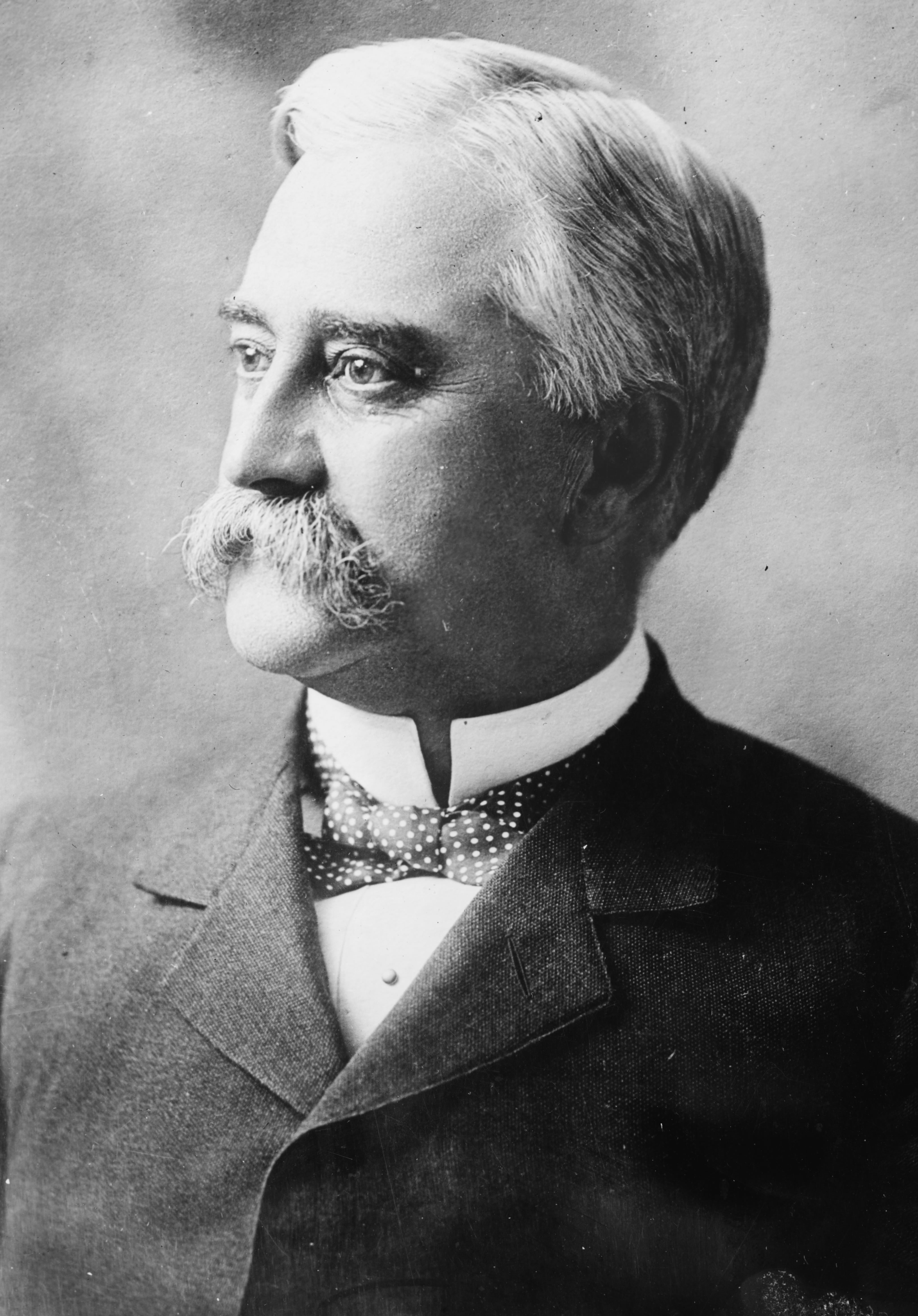
Candidate	John Walter Smith
Party	Democratic
Legislative vote	-
Percentage	-%

William Pinkney Whyte died, and John Walter Smith was elected by an unknown margin, for the Class 3 seat.

== New York ==
The election was held on January 19, 1909, by the New York State Legislature. Republican Thomas C. Platt had been re-elected to this seat in 1903, and his term would expire on March 3, 1909. At the state election in November 1908, 35 Republicans and 16 Democrats were elected for a two-year term (1909–1910) in the state senate; and 99 Republicans and 51 Democrats were elected for the session of 1909 to the Assembly. The 132nd New York State Legislature met from January 5 to April 30, 1909, at Albany, New York.

The Republican caucus met on January 18. State Senator J. Mayhew Wainwright presided. The caucus nominated U.S. Secretary of State Elihu Root unanimously. Root was the choice of President Theodore Roosevelt. President pro tempore of the State Senate John Raines warmly lauded Root's nomination, eulogized the retiring U.S. Senator Platt, and declared war on Governor Charles Evans Hughes's reforms. The Democratic caucus met also on January 18. They nominated ex-Lieutenant Governor Lewis S. Chanler unanimously. Chanler had been elected lieutenant governor in 1906 on the Democratic/Independence League ticket, and had served under Republican governor Hughes. Chanler had just been defeated when running against Hughes for governor in November 1908.

Elihu Root was the choice of both the Assembly and the state senate, and was declared elected.

House	Republican		Democratic	
State Senate (50 members)	✓ Elihu Root	35	Lewis S. Chanler	15
State Assembly (150 members)	✓ Elihu Root	90	Lewis S. Chanler	30

Note: The votes were cast on January 19, but both houses met in a joint session on January 20 to compare nominations and declare the result.

== Pennsylvania ==
=== Pennsylvania (regular) ===
The regularly scheduled general election in Pennsylvania was held on January 19, 1909. Boies Penrose was re-elected by the Pennsylvania General Assembly. This was the last Class III U.S. Senate election to be decided by the Pennsylvania General Assembly before the ratification of the 17th Amendment to the U.S. Constitution, which mandated direct election of U.S. senators.

The Pennsylvania General Assembly, consisting of the House of Representatives and the Senate, convened on January 19, 1909, to elect a senator to fill the term beginning on March 4, 1909. Incumbent Republican Boies Penrose, who was elected in 1897 and re-elected in 1903, was a successful candidate for re-election to another term. The results of the vote of both houses combined are as follows:

State Legislature results
Party	Candidate	Votes	%
Republican	Boies Penrose (incumbent)	198	77.04%
Democratic	George M. Dimeling	42	16.34%
Republican	Edwin S. Stuart	2	0.78%
Republican	John O. Sheatz	1	0.39%
Democratic	William Potter	1	0.39%
N/A	Not voting	13	5.06%
Totals		257	100.00%

=== Pennsylvania (special) ===
A special election was held on March 16, 1909. George T. Oliver was elected by the Pennsylvania General Assembly.

Republican Philander C. Knox was appointed to the Senate in June 1904 after the death of Matthew Quay. Knox was subsequently elected to a full term in the Senate by the Pennsylvania General Assembly, consisting of the House of Representatives and the Senate, in January 1905. Knox served in the U.S. Senate until his resignation on March 4, 1909, to become United States secretary of state in the William Howard Taft administration, leaving the seat vacant until a successor was elected.

Following Knox's resignation, the Pennsylvania General Assembly convened on March 16, 1909, to elect a new senator to fill the vacancy. The results of the vote of both houses combined are as follows:

State Legislature results
Party	Candidate	Votes	%
Republican	George T. Oliver	201	78.21
Democratic	Webster Grim	39	15.18
Republican	Nathaniel Ewing	1	0.39
N/A	Not voting	16	6.23
Totals		257	100.00%

== See also ==
- 1908 United States elections
  - 1908 United States House of Representatives elections
  - 1908 United States presidential election
- 60th United States Congress
- 61st United States Congress
