= 1902–03 United States Senate elections =

- January 15, 1902 – April 22, 1903
- Class 3

30 of the 90 seats in the U.S. Senate 46 seats needed for a majority
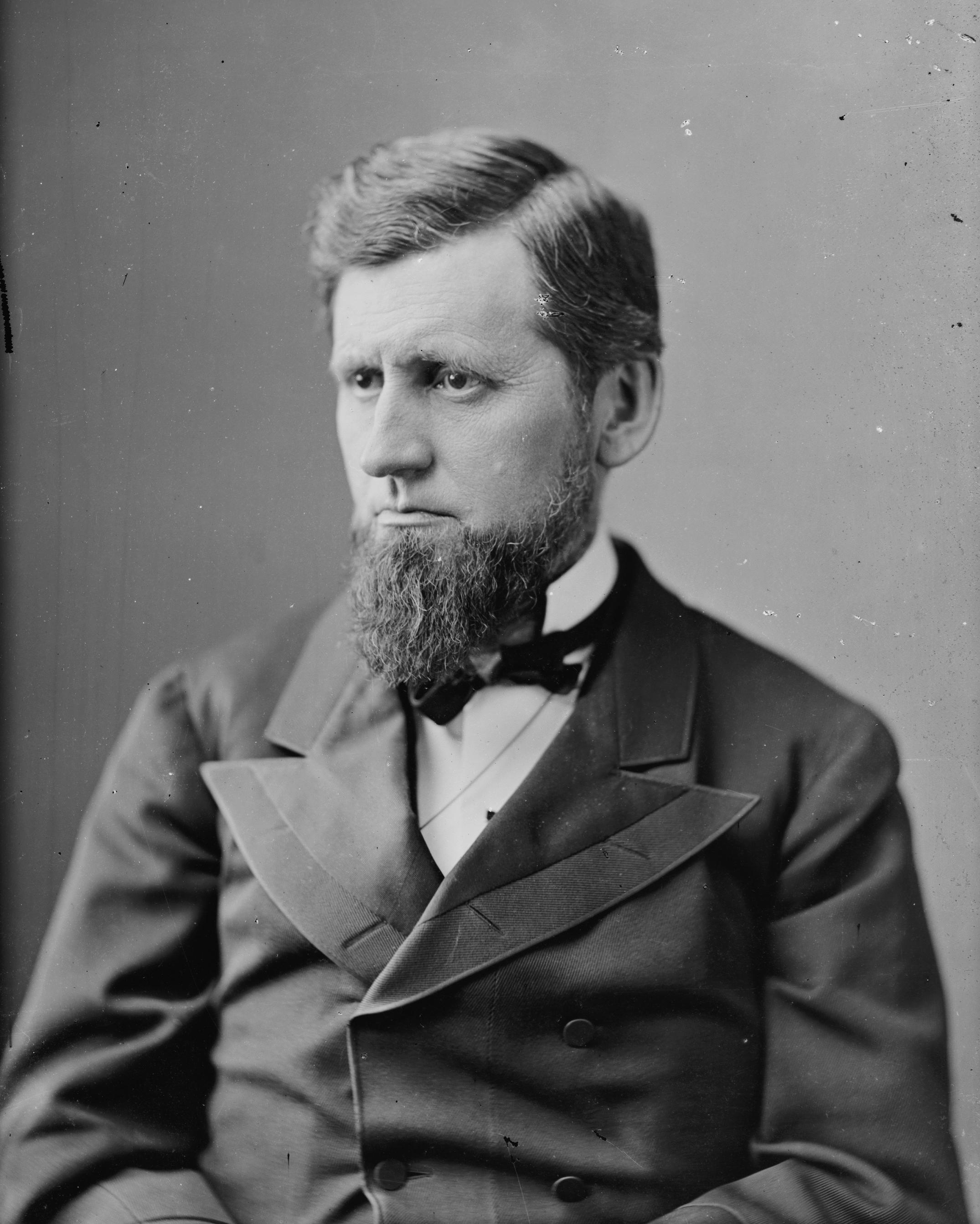

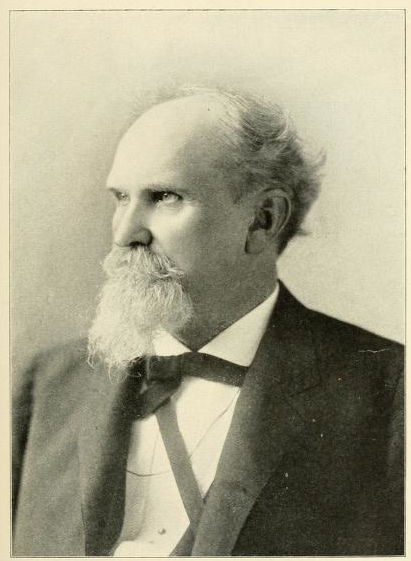
	Majority party	Minority party
Leader	William B. Allison (Note: as Republican Conference Chairman)	James K. Jones (Note: as Democratic Conference Chairman) (retired)
Party	Republican	Democratic
Leader since	March 4, 1897	March 4, 1899
Leader's seat	Iowa	Arkansas
Seats before	55	29
Seats after	57	33
Seat change	▲2	▲4
Seats up	18	8
Races won	18	11
	Third party	Fourth party
Party	Silver Republican	Populist
Seats before	2	2
Seats after	0	0
Seat change	▼2	▼2
Seats up	2	2
Races won	0	0
- Results of the elections: Democratic gain Democratic hold Republican gain Republican hold
Majority conference chairman before election
William B. Allison
Republican
Elected Majority conference chairman
William B. Allison
Republican

The 1902–03 United States Senate elections were held on various dates in various states. As these U.S. Senate elections were prior to the ratification of the Seventeenth Amendment in 1913, senators were chosen by state legislatures. Senators were elected over a wide range of time throughout 1902 and 1903, and a seat may have been filled months late or remained vacant due to legislative deadlock. In these elections, terms were up for the senators in Class 3.

== Events of the election ==
The Democratic Party gained four seats, but the Republicans kept their strong majority. This election marked the end of the two third parties, the Populists and Silver Republicans. Republicans took both Populist seats (Idaho and Kansas) along with one Silver Republican seat in Washington. Democrats took the other Silver Republican seat in Colorado as incumbent Senator Henry Teller was re-elected as a Democrat and flipped four Republican seats in Maryland, Kentucky, North Carolina, and Nevada. Republicans flipped only one Democratic seat (Utah), but also gained both vacant Delaware seats, which had been empty due to legislative deadlock in 1898 and 1900, respectively.

Besides the double-barrel special elections in Delaware, a special election was held in Michigan.

In Florida, the legislature failed to elect until shortly after the beginning of the 58th Congress on March 4.

== Results summary ==
Senate party division, 58th Congress (1903–1905)

- Majority party: Republican (57)
- Minority party: Democratic (33)
- Vacant (0)
- Total seats: 90

== Change in composition ==
=== Before the elections ===
After the January 29, 1902, special election in New Jersey.

					D_{1}	D_{2}	D_{3}	D_{4}	D_{5}
D_{15}	D_{14}	D_{13}	D_{12}	D_{11}	D_{10}	D_{9}	D_{8}	D_{7}	D_{6}
D_{16}	D_{17}	D_{18}	D_{19}	D_{20}	D_{21}	D_{22} Ala. Ran	D_{23} Ark. Ran	D_{24} Fla. Ran	D_{25} Ga. Ran
SR_{1} Colo. Ran	SR_{2} Wash. Ran	P_{1} Kan. Ran	P_{2} Idaho; Retired	V_{2} Del. (sp cl.2)	V_{1} Del. (sp cl.1)	D_{29} Utah; Ran	D_{28} S.C. Retired	D_{27} Mo. Retired	D_{26} La. Ran
R_{55} Wisc. Ran	R_{54} Vt. Ran	R_{53} S.D. Ran	R_{52} Pa. Ran	R_{51} Ore. Retired	R_{50} Ohio; Ran	R_{49} N.D. Ran	R_{48} N.C. Ran	R_{47} N.Y. Ran	R_{46} N.H. Ran
Majority →									R_{46} N.H. Ran
R_{36}	R_{37}	R_{38} Calif. Ran	R_{39} Conn. Ran	R_{40} Ind. Ran	R_{41} Ill. Retired	R_{42} Iowa; Ran	R_{43} Ky. Retired	R_{44} Md. Retired	R_{45} Nev. Retired
R_{35}	R_{34}	R_{33}	R_{32}	R_{31}	R_{30}	R_{29}	R_{28}	R_{27}	R_{26}
R_{16}	R_{17}	R_{18}	R_{19}	R_{20}	R_{21}	R_{22}	R_{23}	R_{24}	R_{25}
R_{15}	R_{14}	R_{13}	R_{12}	R_{11}	R_{10}	R_{9}	R_{8}	R_{7}	R_{6}
					R_{1}	R_{2}	R_{3}	R_{4}	R_{5}

=== Result of the elections ===
					D_{1}	D_{2}	D_{3}	D_{4}	D_{5}
D_{15}	D_{14}	D_{13}	D_{12}	D_{11}	D_{10}	D_{9}	D_{8}	D_{7}	D_{6}
D_{16}	D_{17}	D_{18}	D_{19}	D_{20}	D_{21}	D_{22} Ala. Re-elected	D_{23} Ark. Hold	D_{24} Colo. Gain	D_{25} Ga. Re-elected
R_{56} Wash. Gain	R_{57} Wisc. Re-elected	V_{3} Fla. D Loss	D_{32} S.C. Hold	D_{31} N.C. Gain	D_{30} Nev. Gain	D_{29} Mo. Hold	D_{28} Md. Gain	D_{27} La. Re-elected	D_{26} Ky. Gain
R_{55} Vt. Re-elected	R_{54} Utah; Gain	R_{53} S.D. Elected (Note: Appointee elected)	R_{52} Pa. Re-elected	R_{51} Ore. Hold	R_{50} Ohio; Re-elected	R_{49} N.D. Re-elected	R_{48} N.Y. Re-elected	R_{47} N.H. Re-elected	R_{46} Kan. Gain
Majority →									R_{46} Kan. Gain
R_{36}	R_{37}	R_{38} Calif. Re-elected	R_{39} Conn. Re-elected	R_{40} Del. (sp cl.1); Elected	R_{41} Del. (sp cl.2); Elected	R_{42} Idaho; Gain	R_{43} Ill. Hold	R_{44} Ind. Re-elected	R_{45} Iowa; Re-elected
R_{35}	R_{34}	R_{33}	R_{32}	R_{31}	R_{30}	R_{29}	R_{28}	R_{27}	R_{26}
R_{16}	R_{17}	R_{18}	R_{19}	R_{20}	R_{21}	R_{22}	R_{23}	R_{24}	R_{25}
R_{15}	R_{14}	R_{13}	R_{12}	R_{11}	R_{10}	R_{9}	R_{8}	R_{7}	R_{6}
					R_{1}	R_{2}	R_{3}	R_{4}	R_{5}

=== Beginning of the next Congress ===
					D_{1}	D_{2}	D_{3}	D_{4}	D_{5}
D_{15}	D_{14}	D_{13}	D_{12}	D_{11}	D_{10}	D_{9}	D_{8}	D_{7}	D_{6}
D_{16}	D_{17}	D_{18}	D_{19}	D_{20}	D_{21}	D_{22}	D_{23}	D_{24}	D_{25}
R_{56}	R_{57}	D_{33} Fla. Appointed	D_{32}	D_{31}	D_{30}	D_{29}	D_{28}	D_{27}	D_{26}
R_{55}	R_{54}	R_{53}	R_{52}	R_{51}	R_{50}	R_{49}	R_{48}	R_{47}	R_{46}
Majority →									R_{46}
R_{36}	R_{37}	R_{38}	R_{39}	R_{40}	R_{41}	R_{42}	R_{43}	R_{44}	R_{45}
R_{35}	R_{34}	R_{33}	R_{32}	R_{31}	R_{30}	R_{29}	R_{28}	R_{27}	R_{26}
R_{16}	R_{17}	R_{18}	R_{19}	R_{20}	R_{21}	R_{22}	R_{23}	R_{24}	R_{25}
R_{15}	R_{14}	R_{13}	R_{12}	R_{11}	R_{10}	R_{9}	R_{8}	R_{7}	R_{6}
					R_{1}	R_{2}	R_{3}	R_{4}	R_{5}

Key:

D_{#}	Democratic
P_{#}	Populist
R_{#}	Republican
SR_{#}	Silver Republican
V_{#}	Vacant

== Race summaries ==
=== Elections during the 57th Congress ===
In these elections, the winners were elected and seated during 1902 or in 1903 before March 4.

Elections ordered by date, then state.

State	Incumbent			Results	Candidates
State	Senator	Party	Electoral history	Results	Candidates
Iowa (Class 2)	Jonathan P. Dolliver	Republican	1900 (appointed); 1901 (appointed)	Interim appointee elected January 22, 1902.	▌ ✓ Jonathan P. Dolliver (Republican) 119; ▌John J. Seerley (Democratic) 20
New Jersey (Class 2)	William J. Sewell	Republican	1895; 1901	Incumbent died December 27, 1901. New senator elected January 28, 1902. Republican hold.	▌ ✓ John F. Dryden (Republican) 65; ▌Allan L. McDermott (Democratic) 18
Michigan (Class 2)	Russell A. Alger	Republican	1902 (appointed)	Interim appointee elected January 20, 1903.	▌ ✓ Russell A. Alger (Republican); [data missing]
South Dakota (Class 3)	Alfred B. Kittredge	Republican	1901 (appointed)	Interim appointee elected January 21, 1903. Winner was also elected to the next term; see below.	▌ ✓ Alfred B. Kittredge (Republican) 109; ▌John A. Bowler (Democratic) 13
Delaware (Class 1)	Vacant			Legislature had failed to elect. New senator elected March 2, 1903. Republican gain.	▌ ✓ L. Heisler Ball (Republican); [data missing]
Delaware (Class 2)	Vacant			Legislature had failed to elect. New senator elected March 2, 1903. Republican gain.	▌ ✓ J. Frank Allee (Republican); [data missing]

=== Races leading to the 58th Congress ===
In these regular elections, the winners were elected for the term beginning March 4, 1903; ordered by state.

All of the elections involved the Class 3 seats.

State	Incumbent			Results	Candidates
State	Senator	Party	Electoral history	Results	Candidates
Alabama	Edmund Pettus	Democratic	1897	Incumbent re-elected January 26, 1903.	▌ ✓ Edmund Pettus (Democratic); Unopposed
Arkansas	James K. Jones	Democratic	1885; 1891; 1897	Incumbent lost re-election. New senator re-elected January 20, 1903. Democratic hold.	▌ ✓ James P. Clarke (Democratic); [data missing]
California	George C. Perkins	Republican	1895 (special); 1897	Incumbent re-elected January 13, 1903.	▌ ✓ George C. Perkins (Republican) 91; ▌Franklin K. Lane (Democratic) 17; ▌Eugene Schmitz (Union Labor) 7
Colorado	Henry M. Teller	Silver; Republican	1885; 1891; 1897	Incumbent re-elected January 24, 1903, as a Democrat. Democratic gain.	▌ ✓ Henry M. Teller (Democratic); [data missing]
Connecticut	Orville H. Platt	Republican	1879; 1885; 1891; 1897	Incumbent re-elected January 20, 1903.	▌ ✓ Orville H. Platt (Republican); [data missing]
Florida	Stephen Mallory II	Democratic	1897	Legislature failed to elect. Democratic loss. Incumbent was later appointed to begin the term. Incumbent was later re-elected; see below.	None.
Georgia	Alexander S. Clay	Democratic	1896	Incumbent re-elected November 4, 1902.	▌ ✓ Alexander S. Clay (Democratic) 171; ▌Walter Johnson (Republican) 4
Idaho	Henry Heitfeld	Populist	1897	Incumbent retired. New senator elected January 13, 1903. Republican gain.	▌ ✓ Weldon B. Heyburn (Republican); [data missing]
Illinois	William E. Mason	Republican	1897	Incumbent retired. New senator elected January 20, 1903. Republican hold.	▌ ✓ Albert J. Hopkins (Republican); [data missing]
Indiana	Charles W. Fairbanks	Republican	1897	Incumbent re-elected January 20, 1903.	▌ ✓ Charles W. Fairbanks (Republican) 101; ▌Benjamin F. Shively (Democratic) 44
Iowa	William B. Allison	Republican	1872; 1878; 1884; 1890; 1896	Incumbent re-elected January 22, 1902.	▌ ✓ William B. Allison (Republican) 119; ▌Edward Hankinson Thayer (Democratic) 20
Kansas	William A. Harris	Populist	1897	Incumbent lost re-election. New senator elected January 28, 1903. Republican gain.	▌ ✓ Chester I. Long (Republican) 123; ▌William A. Harris (Populist) 35
Kentucky	William J. Deboe	Republican	1897	Incumbent lost re-election. New senator elected January 21, 1902, after an election on January 14, 1902. Democratic gain.	▌ ✓ James B. McCreary (Democratic) 94; ▌ William J. Deboe (Republican) 30; ▌ William O. Bradley (Republican) 1
Louisiana	Samuel D. McEnery	Democratic	1896	Incumbent re-elected early May 22, 1900.	▌ ✓ Samuel D. McEnery (Democratic); [data missing]
Maryland	George L. Wellington	Republican	1886	Incumbent retired. New senator elected January 15, 1902. Democratic gain.	▌ ✓ Arthur P. Gorman (Democratic); [data missing]
Missouri	George G. Vest	Democratic	1879; 1885; 1891; 1897	Incumbent retired. New senator elected January 20, 1903. Democratic hold.	▌ ✓ William J. Stone (Democratic) 107; ▌Richard C. Kerens (Republican) 66
Nevada	John P. Jones	Republican	1873; 1879; 1885; 1891; 1897	Incumbent retired. New senator elected January 27, 1903. Democratic gain.	▌ ✓ Francis G. Newlands (Democratic) 43; ▌Thomas P. Hawley (Republican) 8
New Hampshire	Jacob H. Gallinger	Republican	1891; 1897	Incumbent re-elected in 1903.	▌ ✓ Jacob H. Gallinger (Republican); Unopposed
New York	Thomas C. Platt	Republican	1881; 1881 (resigned); 1897	Incumbent re-elected January 20, 1903.	▌ ✓ Thomas C. Platt (Republican) 111; ▌John B. Stanchfield (Democratic) 78; ▌Elihu Root (Republican) 3
North Carolina	Jeter C. Pritchard	Republican	1894 (special); 1897	Incumbent lost re-election. New senator elected in 1903. Democratic gain.	▌ ✓ Lee S. Overman (Democratic)
North Dakota	Henry C. Hansbrough	Republican	1891; 1897	Incumbent re-elected January 20, 1903.	▌ ✓ Henry C. Hansbrough (Republican); [data missing]
Ohio	Joseph B. Foraker	Republican	1896	Incumbent re-elected January 15, 1902.	▌ ✓ Joseph B. Foraker (Republican) 87; ▌Charles W. Baker (Democratic) 53
Oregon	Joseph Simon	Republican	1898 (special)	Incumbent retired. New senator elected February 21, 1903. Republican hold.	▌ ✓ Charles W. Fulton (Republican); [data missing]
Pennsylvania	Boies Penrose	Republican	1897	Incumbent re-elected January 20, 1903.	▌ ✓ Boies Penrose (Republican) 194; ▌James M. Guffey (Democratic) 52; ▌Walter F. Leadom (Republican) 1
South Carolina	John L. McLaurin	Democratic	1897 (appointed); 1898 (special)	Incumbent retired. New senator elected January 27, 1903. Democratic hold.	▌ ✓ Asbury Latimer (Democratic); Unopposed
South Dakota	Alfred B. Kittredge	Republican	1901 (appointed); 1903 (special)	Interim appointee elected January 21, 1903. Winner was also elected to finish the current term; see above.	▌ ✓ Alfred B. Kittredge (Republican) 109; ▌John A. Bowler (Democratic) 13
Utah	Joseph L. Rawlins	Democratic	1897	Incumbent lost re-election. New senator elected January 20, 1903. Republican gain.	▌ ✓ Reed Smoot (Republican) 46; ▌Joseph L. Rawlins (Democratic) 10; ▌Heber M. Wells (Republican) 6
Vermont	William P. Dillingham	Republican	1900 (special)	Incumbent re-elected October 14, 1902.	▌ ✓ William P. Dillingham (Republican); [data missing]
Washington	George Turner	Silver; Republican	1897	Incumbent lost re-election as a Democrat. New senator elected January 29, 1903. Republican gain.	▌ ✓ Levi Ankeny (Republican) 99; ▌George Turner (Democratic) 23; ▌Harold Preston (Unknown) 9; ▌John L. Wilson (Republican) 2; ▌Wesley L. Jones (Republican) 1
Wisconsin	John C. Spooner	Republican	1885; 1891 (lost); 1897	Incumbent re-elected January 28, 1903.	▌ ✓ John C. Spooner (Republican) 79.55%; ▌Neal Brown (Democratic) 20.45%

=== Election during the 58th Congress ===
In this election, the winner was elected in 1903 after March 4.

State	Incumbent			Results	Candidates
State	Senator	Party	Electoral history	Results	Candidates
Florida (Class 3)	Stephen Mallory II	Democratic	1897; 1903 (appointed)	Interim appointee re-elected April 22, 1903.	▌ ✓ Stephen Mallory II (Democratic); [data missing]

== Delaware ==
=== Delaware (special, class 1) ===
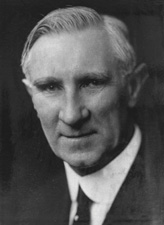
Senator L. Heisler Ball

In the 1898–99 elections, the Delaware legislature had failed to elect a successor to Democratic senator George Gray.

Four years later, Republican congressman L. Heisler Ball was elected in 1903 to finish the term.

He would lose re-election at the 1905 end of the term due to yet another deadlock in the state legislature.

After the advent of popular elections, Ball would return in 1919 for a single full term.

=== Delaware (special, class 2) ===
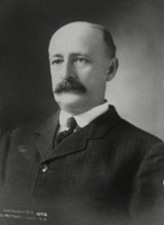
Senator J. Frank Allee

In the 1900/1901 elections, the Delaware legislature had failed to elect a successor to Democratic senator Richard R. Kenney.

Two years later, Republican state senator J. Frank Allee was elected in 1903 to finish the term.

Allee would retire at the end of the term in 1907.

== Florida ==
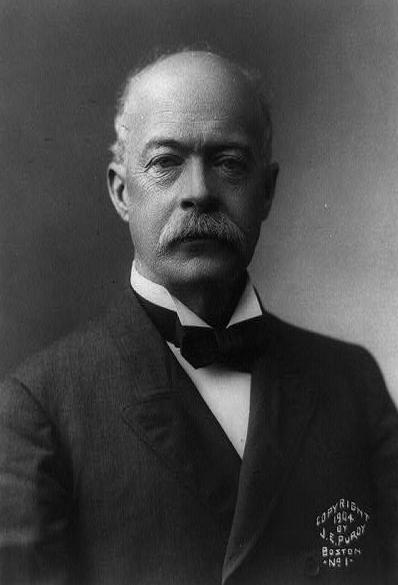
Senator Stephen Mallory II

The Florida legislature failed to elect a senator by the March 4, 1903, beginning of the term. One-term incumbent Democrat Stephen Mallory II was therefore appointed to begin the term, pending the late election.

Democratic incumbent Stephen Mallory II was elected late April 22, 1903, to finish the term.

== Iowa ==
There were two elections due to the death of John H. Gear in 1900.

=== Iowa (regular) ===
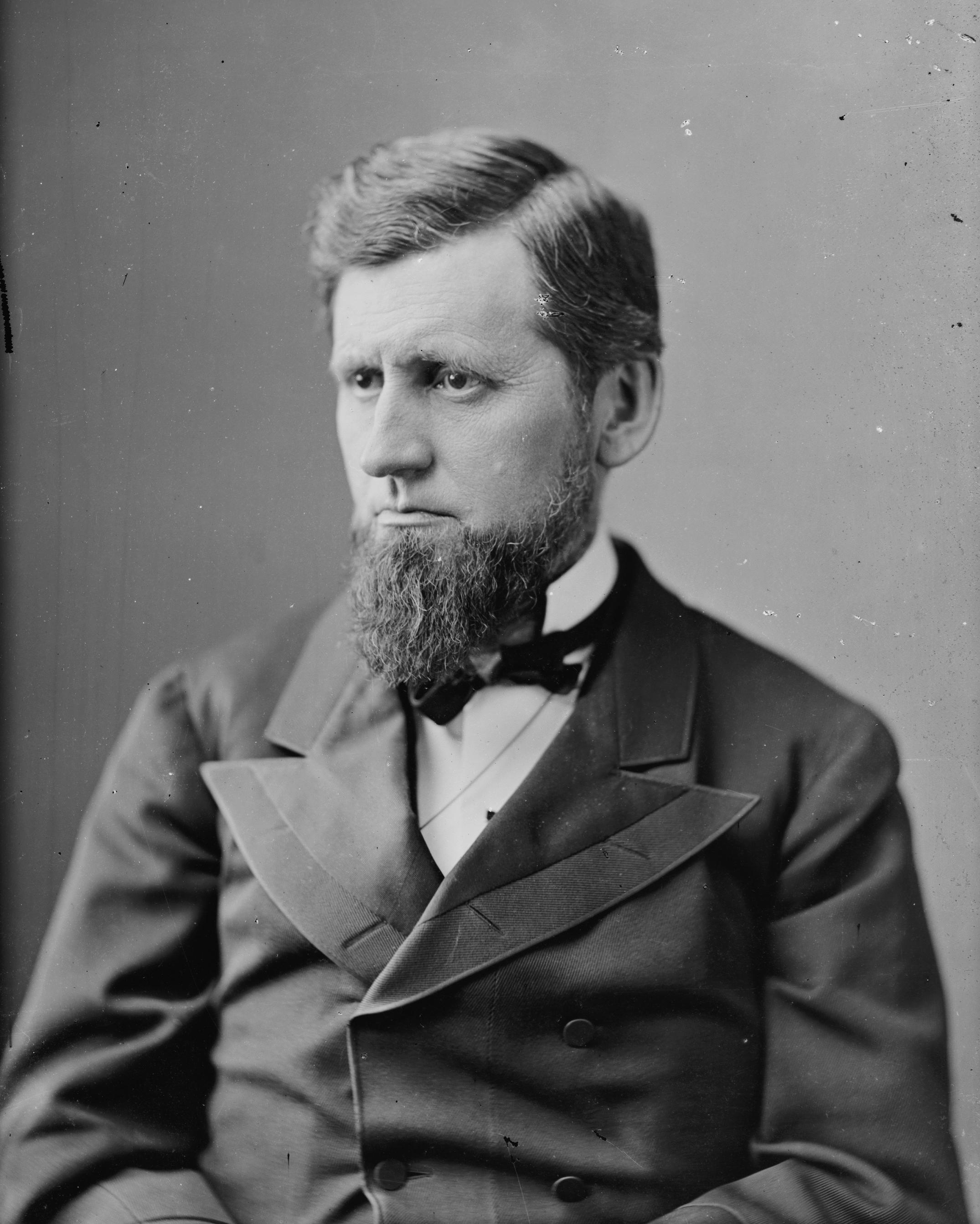
Senator William B. Allison

Five-term William B. Allison was re-elected to a sixth term January 22, 1902. He was Chairman of the Senate Republican Conference, effectively the leader of the Senate.

=== Iowa (special) ===
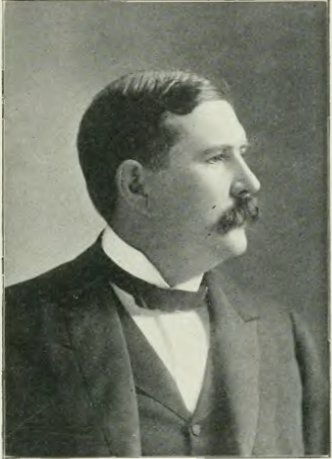
Senator Jonathan P. Dolliver

First-term Republican John H. Gear had died July 14, 1900, and Republican Jonathan P. Dolliver had been appointed August 22, 1900, to finish the term ending in 1901 and to the term beginning thereafter, pending a special election.

Dolliver was elected January 22, 1902, to finish the term that would end in 1907.

== Maryland ==
1902 United States Senate election in Maryland
- November 4, 1902

80 members of the Maryland General Assembly
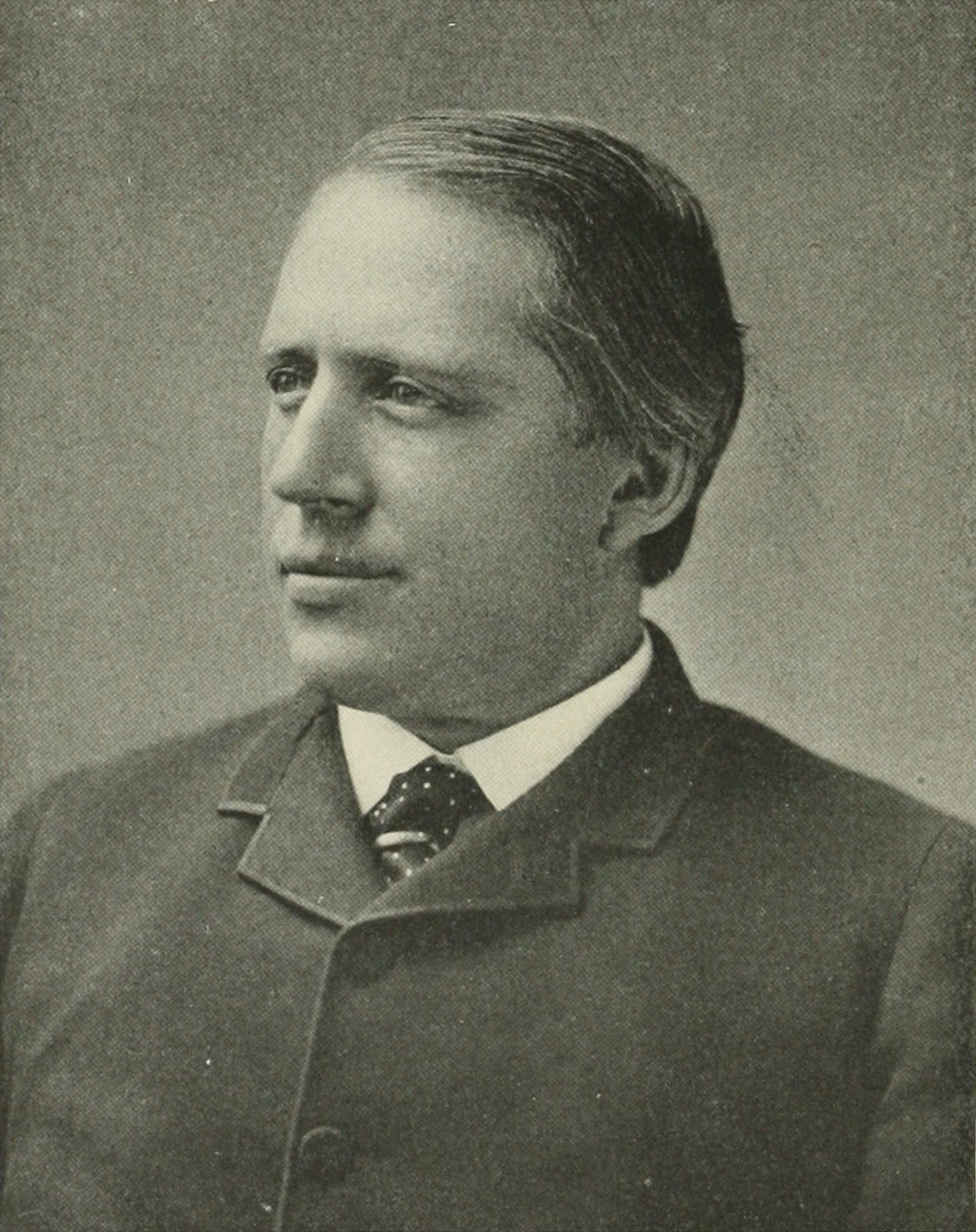
Candidate	Arthur Pue Gorman
Party	Democratic
Legislative vote	-
Percentage	-%

Arthur Pue Gorman was elected by an unknown margin, for the Class 3 seat.

== New York ==
The election in New York was held on January 20, 1903, by the New York State Legislature.

Republican Thomas C. Platt had previously been re-elected to this seat in 1897, and his term would expire on March 3, 1903.

At the State election in November 1902, 28 Republicans and 22 Democrats were elected for a two-year term (1903–1904) in the State Senate; and 89 Republicans and 61 Democrats were elected for the session of 1903 to the Assembly. State Senator Patrick F. Trainor who had been re-elected, died on December 25, 1902, and his successor Peter J. Dooling was elected only after the senatorial election, on January 27. The 126th New York State Legislature met from January 6 to April 23, 1903, at Albany, New York.

The Republican caucus met on January 19. 25 State senators and 84 assemblymen attended, and State Senator William W. Armstrong presided. The caucus re-nominated the incumbent U.S. Senator Thomas C. Platt almost unanimously. A single vote was cast for U.S. Secretary of War Elihu Root by Assemblyman William A. Denison, of Jefferson County. Besides Denison voting against Platt, a small number of anti-Platt men did not attend the caucus. Boss Platt had forced the nomination of Attorney General John C. Davies to the New York Supreme Court in the 5th District, against the local Republican organization's wishes who accused Davies of incompetence. Davies was defeated in a landslide by Democrat Watson M. Rogers although the 5th District was heavily Republican. Thus boss Platt's power began to wane.

1903 Republican caucus for United States Senator result
Candidate	First ballot
√ Thomas C. Platt	108
Elihu Root	1

The Democratic caucus met also on January 19. All 62 State legislators attended, and Assemblyman Charles W. Hinson, of Erie County, presided. They nominated John B. Stanchfield unanimously. Stanchfield had been Mayor of Elmira, and was defeated when running for Governor of New York in 1900 by Republican Benjamin B. Odell Jr.

Thomas C. Platt was the choice of both the Assembly and the State Senate, and was declared elected. Three Republican anti-Platt men, State senators Edgar T. Brackett (28th D.), Elon R. Brown and Nathaniel A. Elsberg (15th D.), voted for Elihu Root.

1903 United States Senator election result
House	Republican		Democratic		Republican	
State Senate (50 members)	√ Thomas C. Platt	25	John B. Stanchfield	21	Elihu Root	3
State Assembly (150 members)	√ Thomas C. Platt	86	John B. Stanchfield	57		

Note: The votes were cast on January 20, but both Houses met in a joint session on January 21 to compare nominations, and declare the result.

== Pennsylvania ==
The election in Pennsylvania was held on January 20, 1903. Boies Penrose was re-elected by the Pennsylvania General Assembly

The Pennsylvania General Assembly, consisting of the House of Representatives and the Senate, convened on January 20, 1903. Incumbent Republican Boies Penrose, who was elected in 1897, was a successful candidate for re-election to another term. The results of the vote of both houses combined are as follows:

State Legislature Results
Party	Candidate	Votes	%
Republican	Boies Penrose (Incumbent)	194	76.38
Democratic	James M. Guffey	52	20.47%
Republican	Walter F. Leadom	1	0.39%
N/A	Not voting	7	2.76%
Totals		254	100.00%

== South Dakota ==
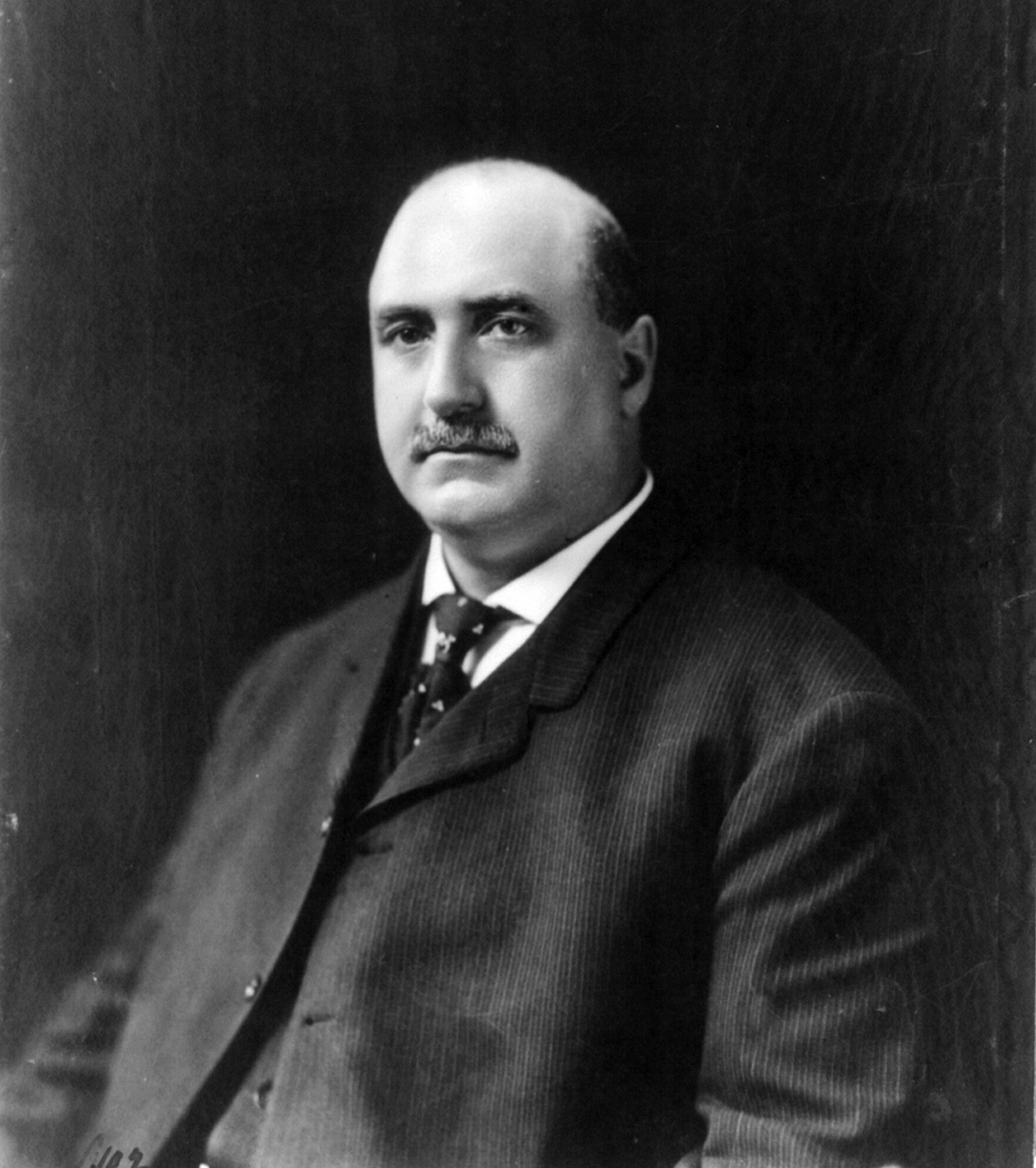
Senator Alfred Kittredge

Two-term Republican James H. Kyle died July 1, 1901, and Republican Alfred Kittredge was appointed July 11, 1901, to continue the term, pending a special election.

=== South Dakota (special) ===
Republican Alfred Kittredge was elected January 20, 1903, to finish the term.

=== South Dakota (regular) ===
Republican Alfred Kittredge was elected January 21, 1903, to the next the term.

== See also ==
- 1902 United States elections
  - 1902 United States House of Representatives elections
  - 1903 United States House of Representatives elections
- 57th United States Congress
- 58th United States Congress
