= 1909 United States Senate election in Pennsylvania =

- January 19, 1909
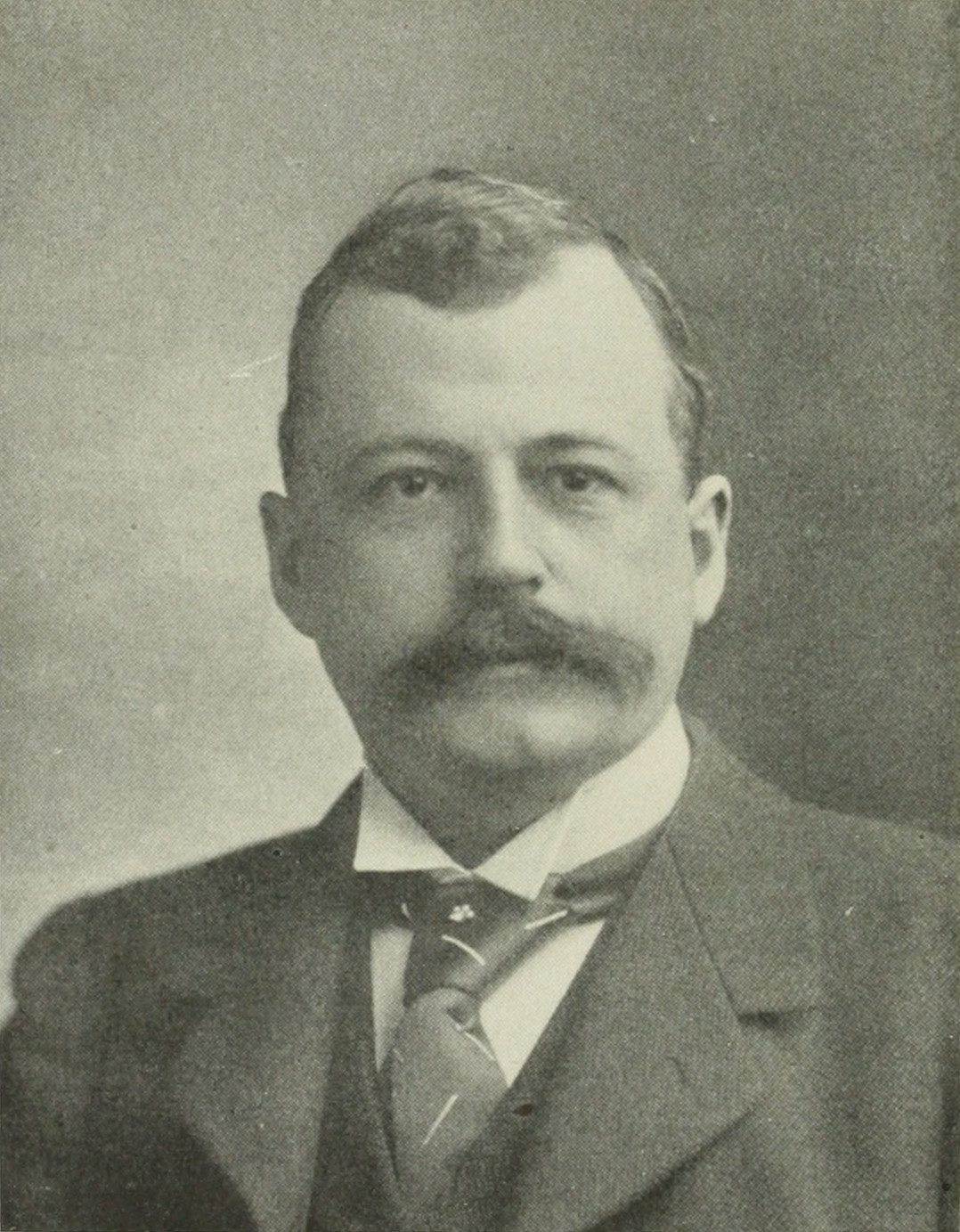

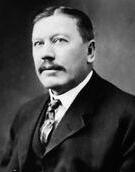
Nominee	Boies Penrose	George M. Dimeling
Party	Republican	Democratic
Electoral vote	198	42
Percentage	77.04%	16.34%
- Senate ballot Penrose Dimeling Stuart Sheatz
Senator before election
Boies Penrose
Republican
Elected Senator
Boies Penrose
Republican

The 1909 United States Senate election in Pennsylvania was held on January 19, 1909. Boies Penrose was re-elected by the Pennsylvania General Assembly to the United States Senate. This was the last Class III U.S. Senate election to be decided by the Pennsylvania General Assembly before the ratification of the 17th Amendment to the U.S. Constitution, which mandated direct election of U.S. Senators.

== Results ==
The Pennsylvania General Assembly, consisting of the House of Representatives and the Senate, convened on January 19, 1909, to elect a Senator to fill the term beginning on March 4, 1909. Incumbent Republican Boies Penrose, who was elected in 1897 and re-elected in 1903, was a successful candidate for re-election to another term. The results of the vote of both houses combined are as follows:

State Legislature Results
Party	Candidate	Votes	%
Republican	Boies Penrose (Inc.)	198	77.04%
Democratic	George M. Dimeling	42	16.34%
Republican	Edwin S. Stuart	2	0.78%
Republican	John O. Sheatz	1	0.39%
Democratic	William Potter	1	0.39%
N/A	Not voting	13	5.06%
Totals		257	100.00%

== See also ==
- 1908 and 1909 United States Senate elections

Preceded by 1903	Pennsylvania U.S. Senate election (Class III); 1909	Succeeded by 1914
