= United States Senate Committee to Establish a University of the United States =

Defunct United States Senate committee

Founded June 2, 1890 as a Select Committee, the Committee to Establish a University of the United States was an initiative of the United States Senate which became a Standing Committee on March 19, 1896. During this time there was also a National University Committee outside of the Senate.

In 1897 the committee tried to pass a bill to create a University of the United States, and three years later it presented a bill to allow the Smithsonian Institution to give out degrees. Neither bill was successful. The committee was disbanded in 1921 as part of a "housecleaning" that got rid of several largely inactive or defunct committees which still officially existed.

== Chairmen of the Select Committee ==
- George F. Edmunds (1890–1891)
- Redfield Proctor (1891–1893)
- Eppa Hunton (1893–1895)
- James Kyle (1895–1897)

== Chairmen of the Standing Committee ==
- George L. Wellington (1897–1901)
- William Joseph Deboe (1901–1903)
- Chester Long (1903–1905)
- James A. Hemenway (1905–1909)
- Simon Guggenheim (1909–1911)
- Joseph F. Johnston (1911–1913)
- William Paul Dillingham (1913–1919)
- John Sharp Williams (1919–1921)
