= Edward Hankinson Thayer =

American politician

Edward Hankinson Thayer (November 27, 1832 – November 7, 1904) was an American politician.

Thayer was a native of Windham, Maine, born on November 27, 1832. He was educated in Orono, and graduated from East Corinth Academy in 1850. Aged eighteen, Thayer moved to Cleveland, Ohio, where he read law, studied medicine, and worked as a journalist.

In 1853, Thayer relocated to Muscatine, Iowa, where he practiced law. He became a county prosecutor in 1855, and was elected a county judge twice, in 1857 and 1859. Thayer attended the Democratic National Convention for the first time in 1860, backing the presidential bid of Stephen A. Douglas. Thayer founded The Muscatine Courier in 1861, lost election to the United States House of Representatives to Hiram Price the following year, then established The Clinton Age in 1868. In 1876, Thayer attended his second Democratic National Convention in support of Samuel J. Tilden, and began serving a two-year term on the Iowa House of Representatives for District 31. During his state legislative tenure, Thayer also served as founding president of the board of trustees for the Iowa State Normal School. In 1884, Thayer attended the Democratic National Convention for a third time. After Grover Cleveland won the presidential nomination and the presidency, Thayer was appointed postmaster of Clinton. He contested the 1902 United States Senate election in Iowa, losing to incumbent William B. Allison.

In early 1904, Thayer moved to San Diego for health reasons. He later returned to Iowa and died in Clinton on November 7, 1904.
