= 1903 United States Senate election in New York =

- January 20, 1903

Majority vote of each house needed to win
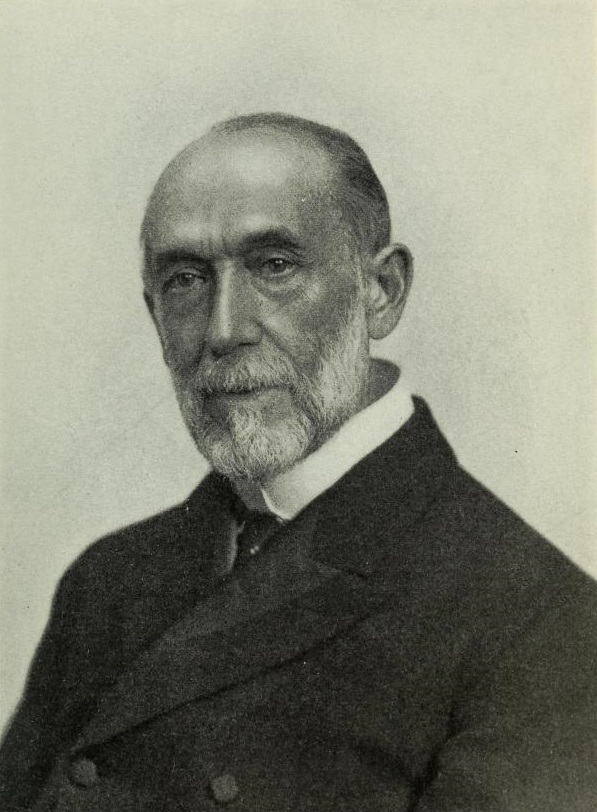

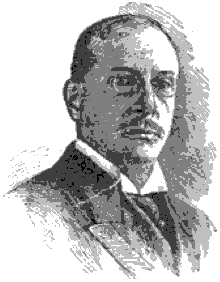

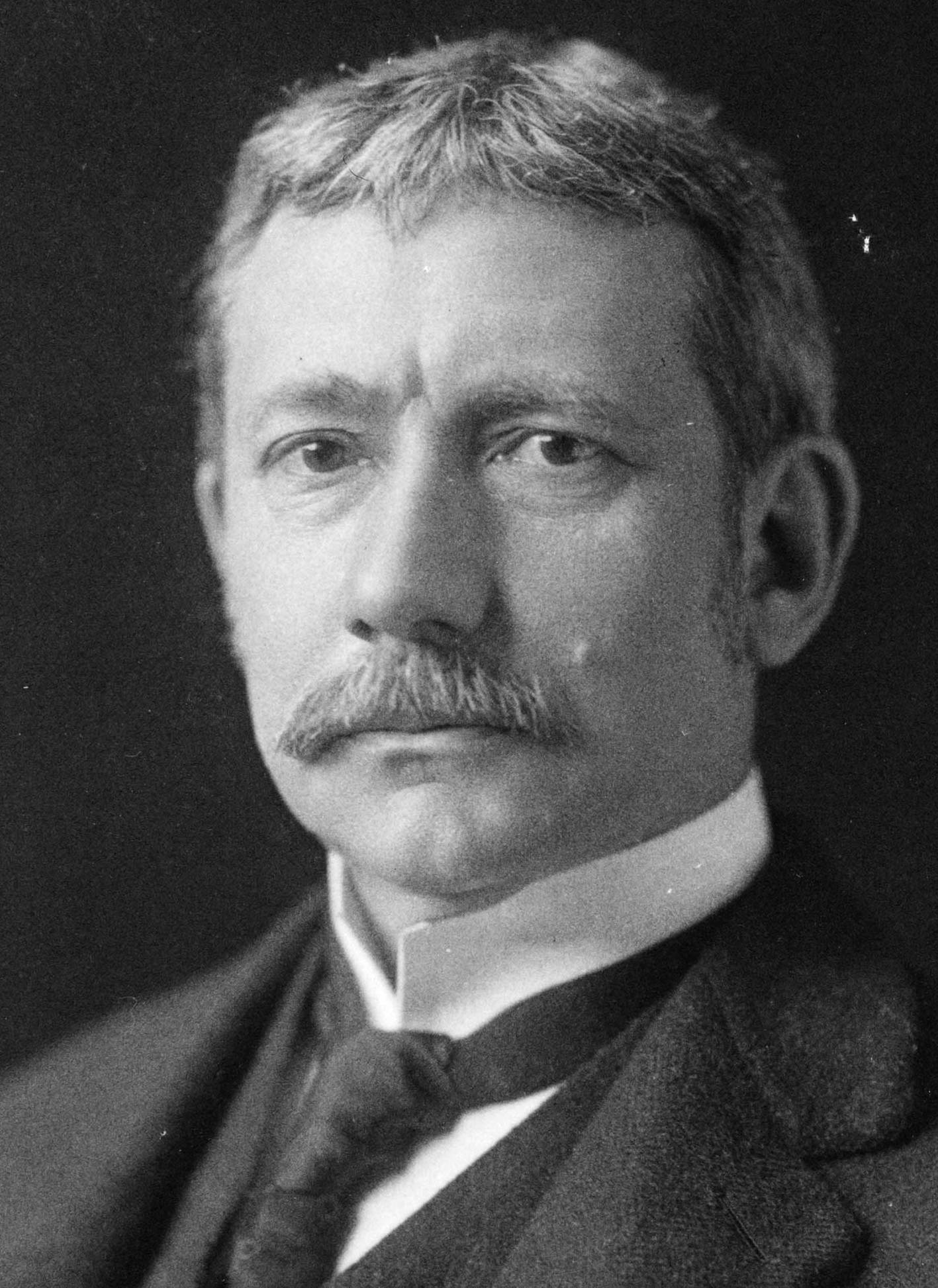
Nominee	Thomas C. Platt	John B. Stanchfield	Elihu Root
Party	Republican	Democratic	Republican
Senate	25	21	3
Percentage	51.02%	42.86%	6.12%
House	86	57	—
Percentage	60.14%	39.86%	—
Senator before election
Thomas C. Platt
Republican
Elected Senator
Thomas C. Platt
Republican

The 1903 United States Senate election in New York was held on January 20, 1903, by the New York State Legislature to elect a U.S. senator (Class 3) to represent the State of New York in the United States Senate.

== Background ==
Republican Thomas C. Platt had been re-elected to this seat in 1897, and his term would expire on March 3, 1903.

At the State election in November 1902, 28 Republicans and 22 Democrats were elected for a two-year term (1903-1904) in the State Senate; and 89 Republicans and 61 Democrats were elected for the session of 1903 to the Assembly. State Senator Patrick F. Trainor who had been re-elected, died on December 25, 1902, and his successor Peter J. Dooling was elected only after the senatorial election, on January 27. The 126th New York State Legislature met from January 6 to April 23, 1903, at Albany, New York.

== Candidates ==
=== Republican caucus ===
The Republican caucus met on January 19. 25 State senators and 84 assemblymen attended, and State Senator William W. Armstrong presided. The caucus re-nominated the incumbent U.S. Senator Thomas C. Platt almost unanimously. A single vote was cast for U.S. Secretary of War Elihu Root by Assemblyman William A. Denison of Jefferson County. Besides Denison voting against Platt, a small number of anti-Platt men did not attend the caucus. Boss Platt had forced the nomination of Attorney General John C. Davies to the New York Supreme Court in the 5th District, against the local Republican organization's wishes who accused Davies of incompetence. Davies was defeated in a landslide by Democrat Watson M. Rogers although the 5th District was heavily Republican. Thus boss Platt's power began to wane.

1903 Republican caucus for United States Senator result
Office	Candidate	First ballot
U.S. Senator (Class 3)	Thomas C. Platt	108
	Elihu Root	1

=== Democratic caucus ===
The Democratic caucus met also on January 19. All 62 State legislators attended, and Assemblyman Charles W. Hinson, of Erie County, presided. They nominated John B. Stanchfield unanimously. Stanchfield had been Mayor of Elmira, and was defeated when running for Governor of New York in 1900 by Republican Benjamin B. Odell Jr.

== Result ==
Thomas C. Platt was the choice of both the Assembly and the State Senate, and was declared elected. Three Republican anti-Platt men, State Senators Edgar T. Brackett (28th D.), Elon R. Brown and Nathaniel A. Elsberg (15th D.), voted for Elihu Root.

1903 United States Senator election result
Office	House	Republican		Democrat		Republican	
U.S. Senator (Class 3)	State Senate (50 members)	Thomas C. Platt	25	John B. Stanchfield	21	Elihu Root	3
	State Assembly (150 members)	Thomas C. Platt	86	John B. Stanchfield	57		

Note: The votes were cast on January 20, but both Houses met in a joint session on January 21 to compare nominations, and declare the result.

== Aftermath ==
Platt remained in the U.S. Senate until March 3, 1909, when he retired. In January 1909, Elihu Root was chosen by the Republicans to succeed Platt.

== See also ==
- United States Senate elections, 1902 and 1903

== Sources ==
- Members of the 58th United States Congress
- PLATT IS RENOMINATED, ONE VOTE AGAINST HIM; ...Devery Protest Against an Utterance of Mr. Stanchfield in Democratic Caucus in NYT on January 20, 1903
- MR. PLATT ELECTED AFTER DENUNCIATION in NYT on January 21, 1903
