= 1902 United States Senate election in Kentucky =

- January 21, 1902
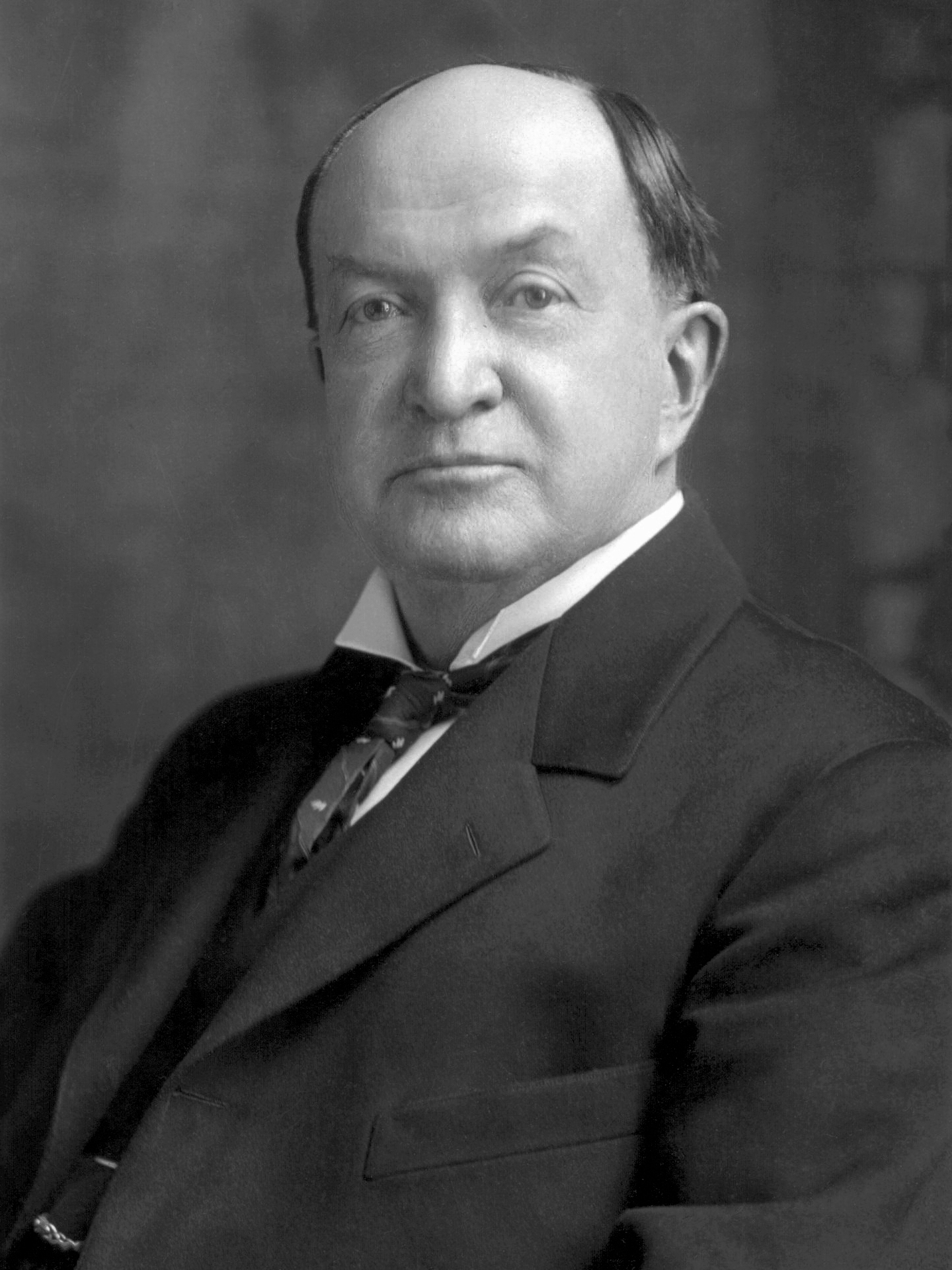

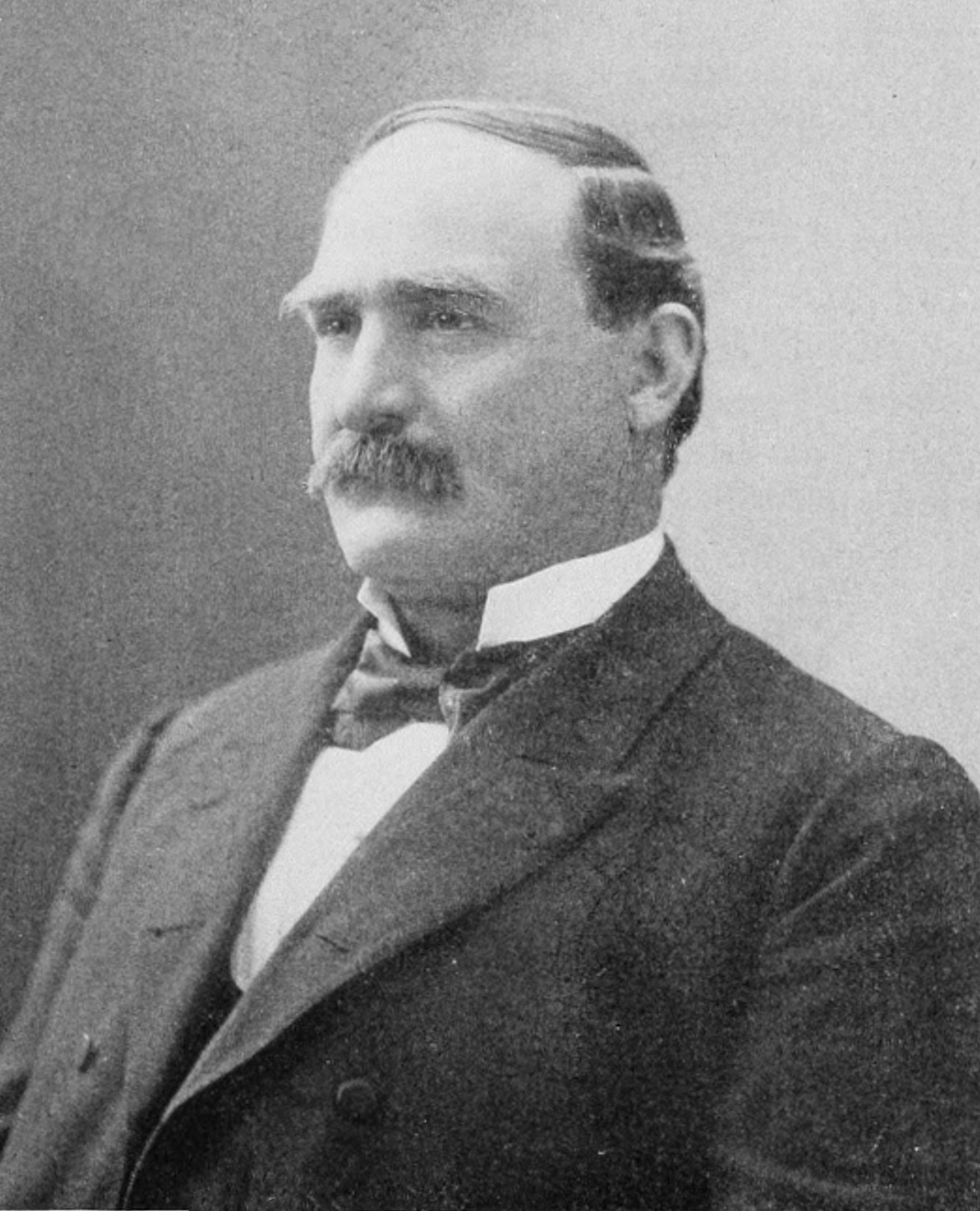
Nominee	James B. McCreary	William J. Deboe
Party	Democratic	Republican
Senate ballot	22 (71.0%)	8 (25.8%)
House ballot	72 (76.6%)	22 (23.4%)
- Blue denotes members voting for McCreary and red denotes those voting for Deboe. Orange denotes one vote for Bradley.
U.S. Senator before election
William J. Deboe
Republican
Elected U.S. Senator
James B. McCreary
Democratic

The 1902 United States Senate election in Kentucky was held on January 21, 1902, after an initial election on January 14, 1902. Democratic candidate James B. McCreary was elected by the Kentucky General Assembly to the United States Senate, defeating incumbent Republican senator William J. Deboe. The election was held twice due to ambiguity in the law setting the election date.

== Democratic nomination ==
The Democratic Party chose to select its candidate by legislative caucus. Former governor and congressman James B. McCreary was nominated on January 9, 1902, defeating judge James E. Cantrill. Congressmen David Highbaugh Smith and Charles K. Wheeler, who had been campaigning for the nomination, withdrew from the contest the afternoon before the caucus was held.

=== Candidates ===
- James E. Cantrill, judge of the Kentucky Court of Appeals and lieutenant governor of Kentucky (1879–1883)
- James B. McCreary, governor of Kentucky (1875–1879) and U.S. representative for Kentucky's 8th congressional district (1885–1897)
- David Highbaugh Smith, U.S. representative for Kentucky's 4th congressional district (1897–1907) (withdrew January 9, 1902)
- Charles K. Wheeler, U.S. representative for Kentucky's 1st congressional district (1897–1903) (withdrew January 9, 1902)

=== Results ===
Caucus vote of Democratic senators

Caucus vote of Democratic representatives
McCreary
Cantrill
Republicans

Democratic caucus results
Candidate	Senate	House	Total	%
James B. McCreary	14	48	62	62.6
James E. Cantrill	11	26	37	37.4
Total votes	25	74	99	100.0

== Republican nominatiom ==
The Republican Party chose to select its candidate by legislative caucus, with incumbent senator William J. Deboe winning the nomination unanimously on January 8, 1902. Governor William O. Bradley and congressman Vincent Boreing, who had been suggested as alternatives, were not put forth as alternative candidates.

=== Candidates ===
- William J. Deboe, U.S. senator (1897–1903)

== Elections ==
=== First election ===
==== Senate ====
1902 United States Senate election in Kentucky (first Senate ballot)
Party	Candidate	Votes	%
Democratic	James B. McCreary	23	65.7
Republican	William J. Deboe (incumbent)	11	31.4
Republican	William O. Bradley	1	2.9
Total votes		35	100.0

==== House of Representatives ====
1902 United States Senate election in Kentucky (first House ballot)
Party	Candidate	Votes	%
Democratic	James B. McCreary	74	75.5
Republican	William J. Deboe (incumbent)	24	24.5
Total votes		98	100.0

=== Second election ===
==== Senate ====
1902 United States Senate election in Kentucky (Senate)
Party	Candidate	Votes	%
Democratic	James B. McCreary	22	71.0
Republican	William J. Deboe (incumbent)	8	25.8
Republican	William O. Bradley	1	3.2
Total votes		31	100.0
Democratic gain from Republican			

==== House of Representatives ====
1902 United States Senate election in Kentucky (House of Representatives)
Party	Candidate	Votes	%
Democratic	James B. McCreary	72	76.6
Republican	William J. Deboe (incumbent)	22	23.4
Total votes		94	100.0
Democratic gain from Republican			

== See also ==
- 1902–03 United States Senate elections

== Sources ==
- "Journal of the Senate of the Commonwealth of Kentucky, 1902". Journals of the Kentucky General Assembly. Frankfort, Kentucky – via HathiTrust.
