= James M. Guffey =

American oil pioneer (1839–1930)

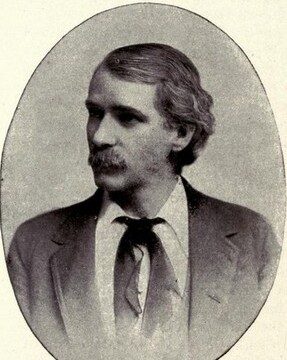

James McClurg Guffey (January 19, 1839, Westmoreland County, Pennsylvania – March 20, 1930, Pittsburgh, Pennsylvania) was an American pioneer in the petroleum industry in Pennsylvania and elsewhere and a longtime Democratic politician in his home state.

== Early life ==
He was born the fifth of six children in Westmoreland County and grew up on the family farm.

At 18, he found work as a clerk for the Louisville and Nashville Railroad in Louisville, Kentucky, before landing a better-paying job with the Adams Southern Express Company in Nashville, Tennessee. In 1872, he returned to his home state to become a salesman in the burgeoning oil industry (see Pennsylvania oil rush), learning the business and starting to work for himself.

== Petroleum industry ==
Guffey made a fortune "amounting to millions as an oil producer". He was involved in developing oil and gas fields in Ohio and West Virginia.

He and John H. Galey established the Guffey and Galey Company in 1880 or 1886. At one time, it was the largest oil producer in the world, outputting 40,000 barrels per day.

The pair arranged the financing needed to drill for oil in the Spindletop oil field. When oil was found on January 10, 1901, it started the Texas oil boom. Guffey had a five-eighths interest in it, Galey one-quarter, and Anthony Francis Lucas one-eighth. Guffey established the J. M. Guffey Petroleum Company in May of that year; the firm bought Galey and Lucas's shares. In 1907, it and other companies merged to form the Gulf Oil Corporation; Guffey sold his seven-fifteens interest for $3 million.

== Politics ==
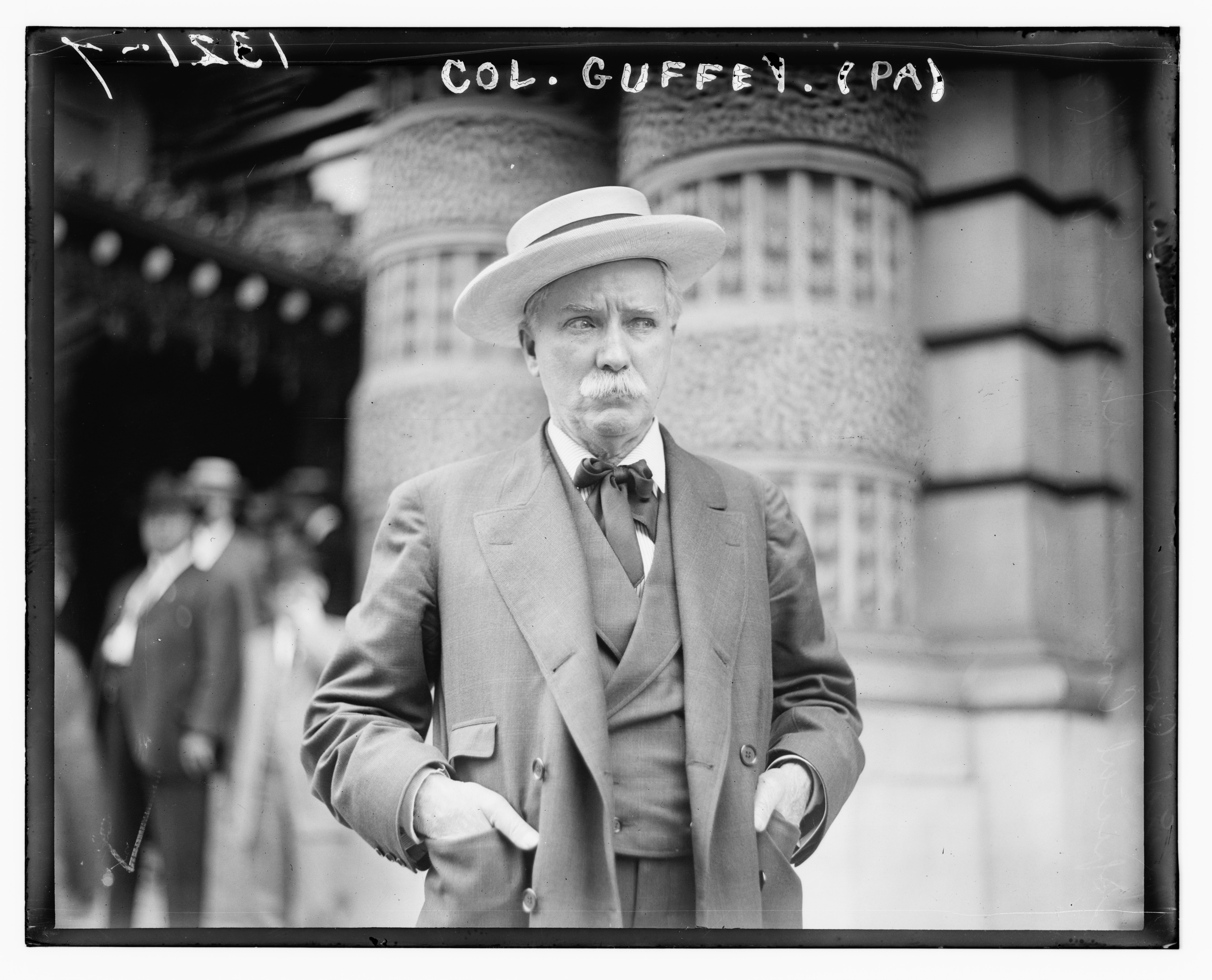

In late August 1897, Guffey was named the Pennsylvania representative to the Democratic National Committee, replacing William F. Harrity. In 1912 he was again elected to the Democratic National Committee following the death of James Kerr.

In the 1901 United States Senate special election in Pennsylvania, he came second to Republican Matthew Quay, with 22% of the vote. In the 1903 Senate election, he lost to Republican Boies Penrose.

== Later life ==
In 1910, his properties were placed in receivership because he did not have the ready cash to cover his liabilities of about $7,00,000, but the receiver stated that Guffey had assets of over $15,000,000.

== Namesake ==
USS J. M. Guffey (ID-1279) was a tanker renamed after him after it was purchased by the Gulf Oil Corporation. It was chartered on behalf of the British Ministry of War Transport for World War I.
