= 1903 United States Senate election in Pennsylvania =

- January 20, 1903
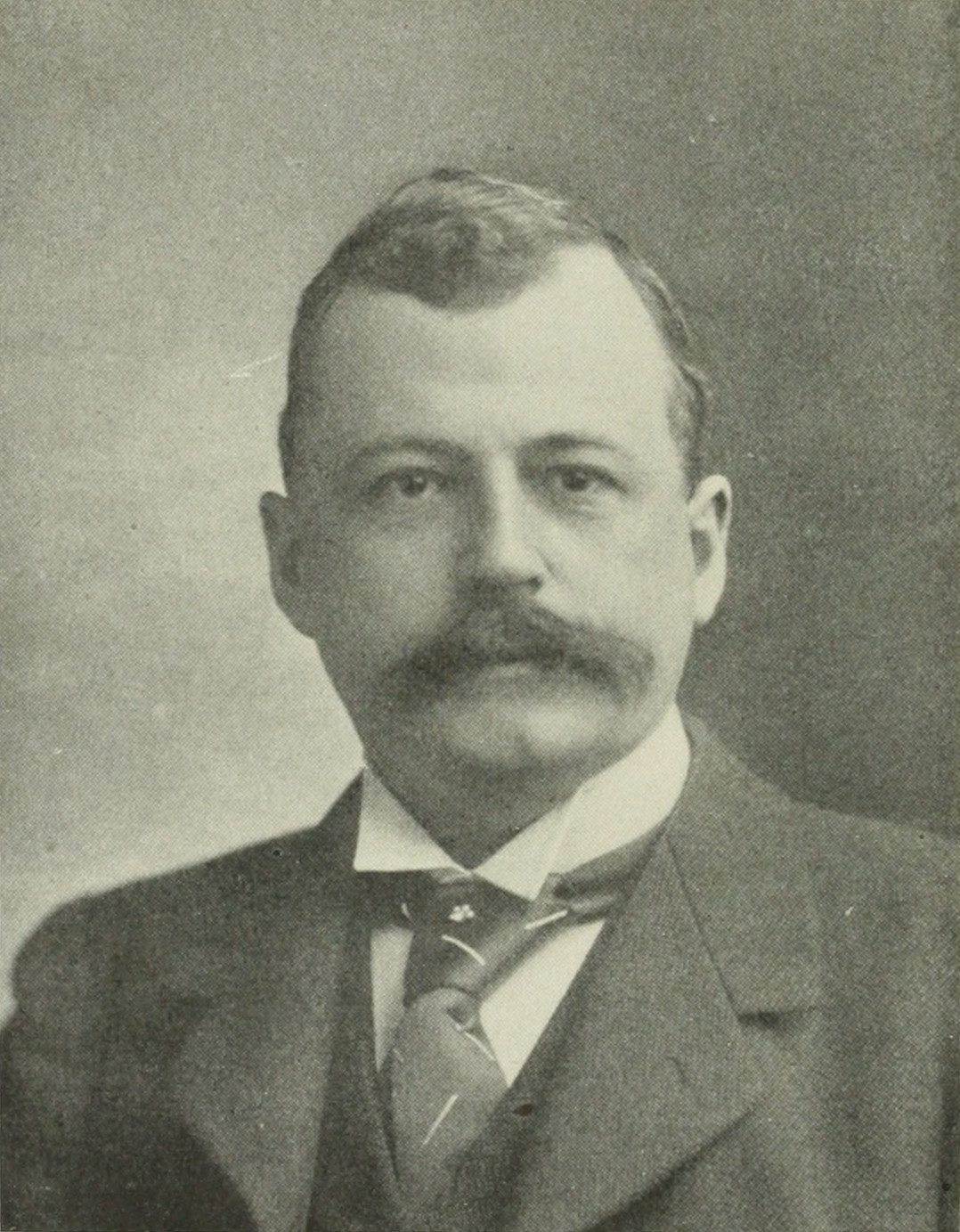

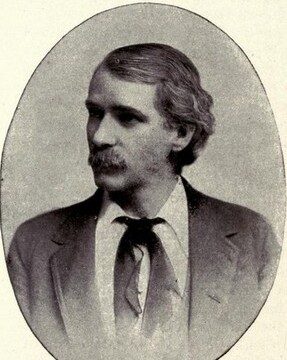
Nominee	Boies Penrose	James M. Guffey
Party	Republican	Democratic
Electoral vote	194	52
Percentage	76.38%	20.47%
Senator before election
Boies Penrose
Republican
Elected Senator
Boies Penrose
Republican

The 1903 United States Senate election in Pennsylvania was held on January 20, 1903. Boies Penrose was re-elected by the Pennsylvania General Assembly to the United States Senate.

== Results ==
The Pennsylvania General Assembly, consisting of the House of Representatives and the Senate, convened on January 20, 1903, to elect a senator to fill the term beginning on March 4, 1903. Incumbent Republican Boies Penrose, who was elected in 1897, was a successful candidate for re-election to another term. The results of the vote of both houses combined are as follows:

State legislature results
Party	Candidate	Votes	%
Republican	Boies Penrose (Inc.)	194	76.38
Democratic	James M. Guffey	52	20.47
Republican	Walter F. Leadom	1	0.39
N/A	Not voting	7	2.76
Totals		254	100.00%

== See also ==
- 1902–03 United States Senate elections

Preceded by 1897	Pennsylvania U.S. Senate election (Class III); 1903	Succeeded by 1909
