= William J. Deboe =

American politician

William J. DeBoe
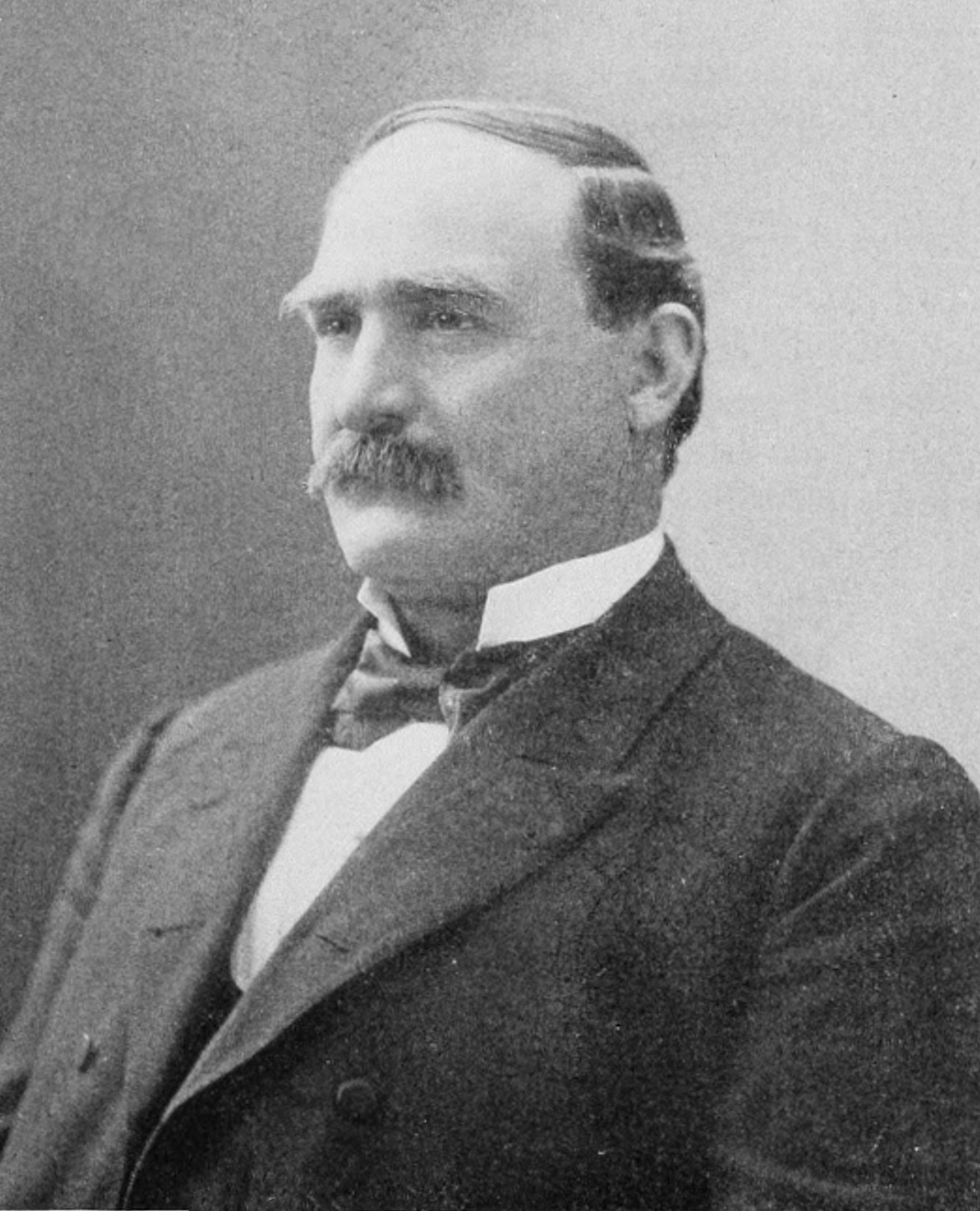
- Deboe, c. 1899

United States Senator from Kentucky
- In office April 29, 1897 – March 3, 1903
- Preceded by: J. C. S. Blackburn
- Succeeded by: James B. McCreary

Member of the Kentucky Senate from the 4th district
- In office January 1, 1894 – April 29, 1897
- Preceded by: J. W. Orr
- Succeeded by: J. H. McConnell

Personal details
- Born: June 30, 1849 Crittenden County, Kentucky
- Died: June 15, 1927 (aged 77) Marion, Kentucky
- Resting place: Maple View Cemetery, Marion, Kentucky
- Party: Republican
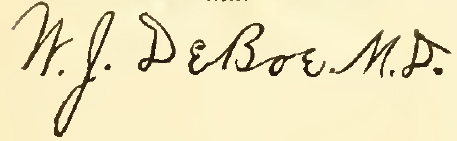
- Signature

William Joseph DeBoe (June 30, 1849 – June 15, 1927) was a U.S. Senator representing Kentucky from 1897 to 1903.

== Early life ==
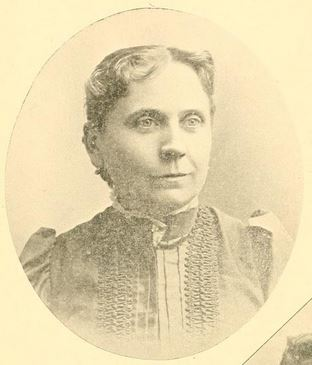
Mrs William Joseph Deboe

Born in Crittenden County, Kentucky, DeBoe attended Ewing College in Ewing, Illinois, studying both law and medicine. He graduated from the University of Louisville School of Medicine and practiced for a few years. He then renewed the study of law and was admitted to the bar in 1889. He practiced law in Marion, Kentucky (Crittenden County).

== Career ==
DeBoe served as superintendent of schools of Crittenden County. He then ran an unsuccessful candidacy for election in 1892 to Congress. He served as a member of the Kentucky State Senate from 1894 to 1897. He was afterward elected as a Republican to the United States Senate and served from April 29, 1897, to March 3, 1903. He was not a candidate for renomination in 1902.

While in the Senate, DeBoe served as chairman to the Committee on Indian Depredations and the Committee to Establish the University of the United States. He was a delegate from Kentucky to the 1912 Republican National Convention. Ten years later he served as the postmaster of Marion, Kentucky from 1923 to 1927. He died in Marion and was interred in Maple View Cemetery in Marion.

== Sources ==
- United States Congress. "William J. Deboe (id: D000182)". Biographical Directory of the United States Congress.
- Political Graveyard

U.S. Senate
| Preceded by Joseph C. S. Blackburn | U.S. senator (Class 3) from Kentucky; 1897–1903; Served alongside: William Lindsay, Joseph C. S. Blackburn | Succeeded by James B. McCreary |
