= 1903 United States Senate election in California =

- January 13, 1903

Majority vote of each house needed to win
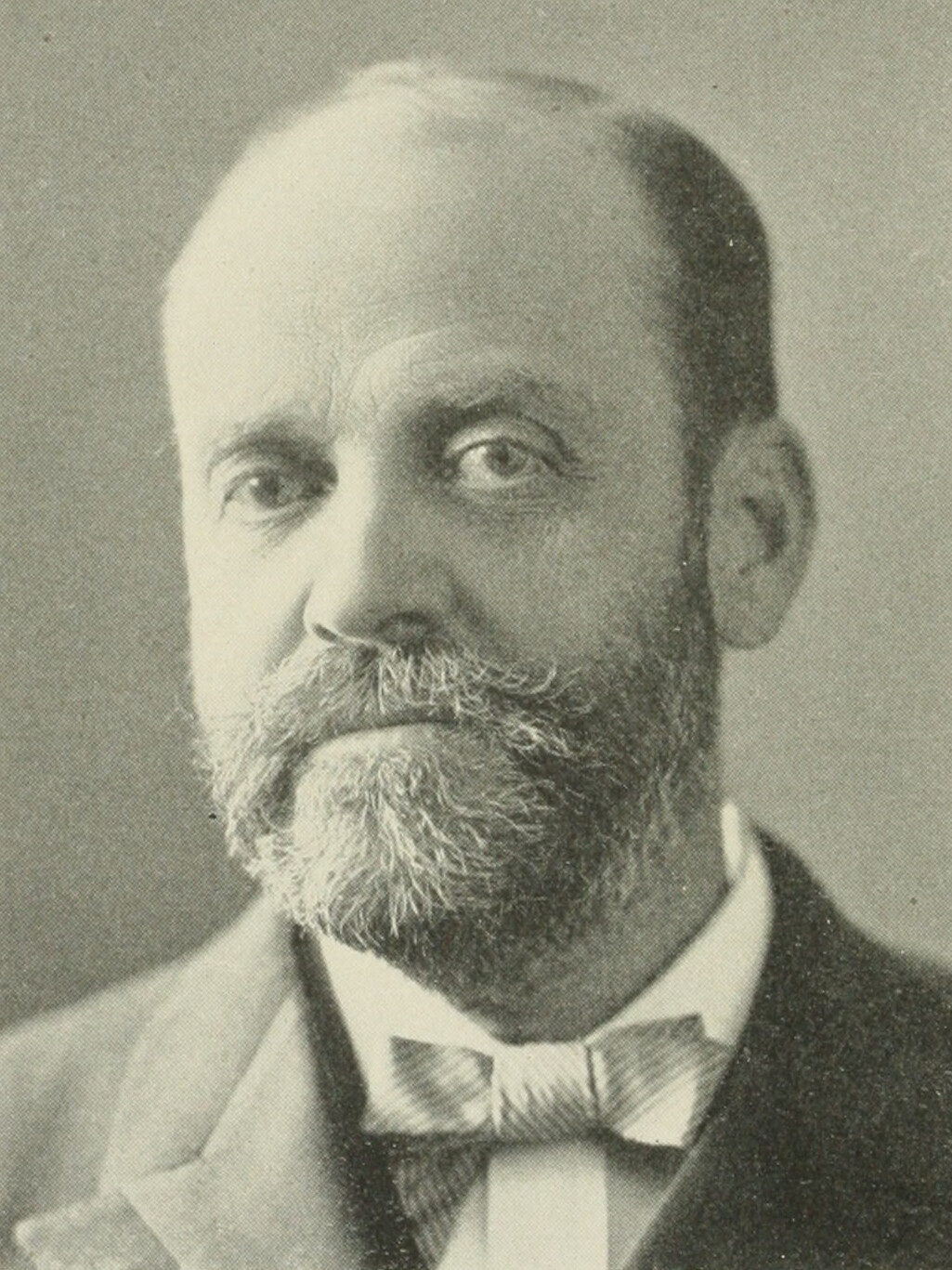

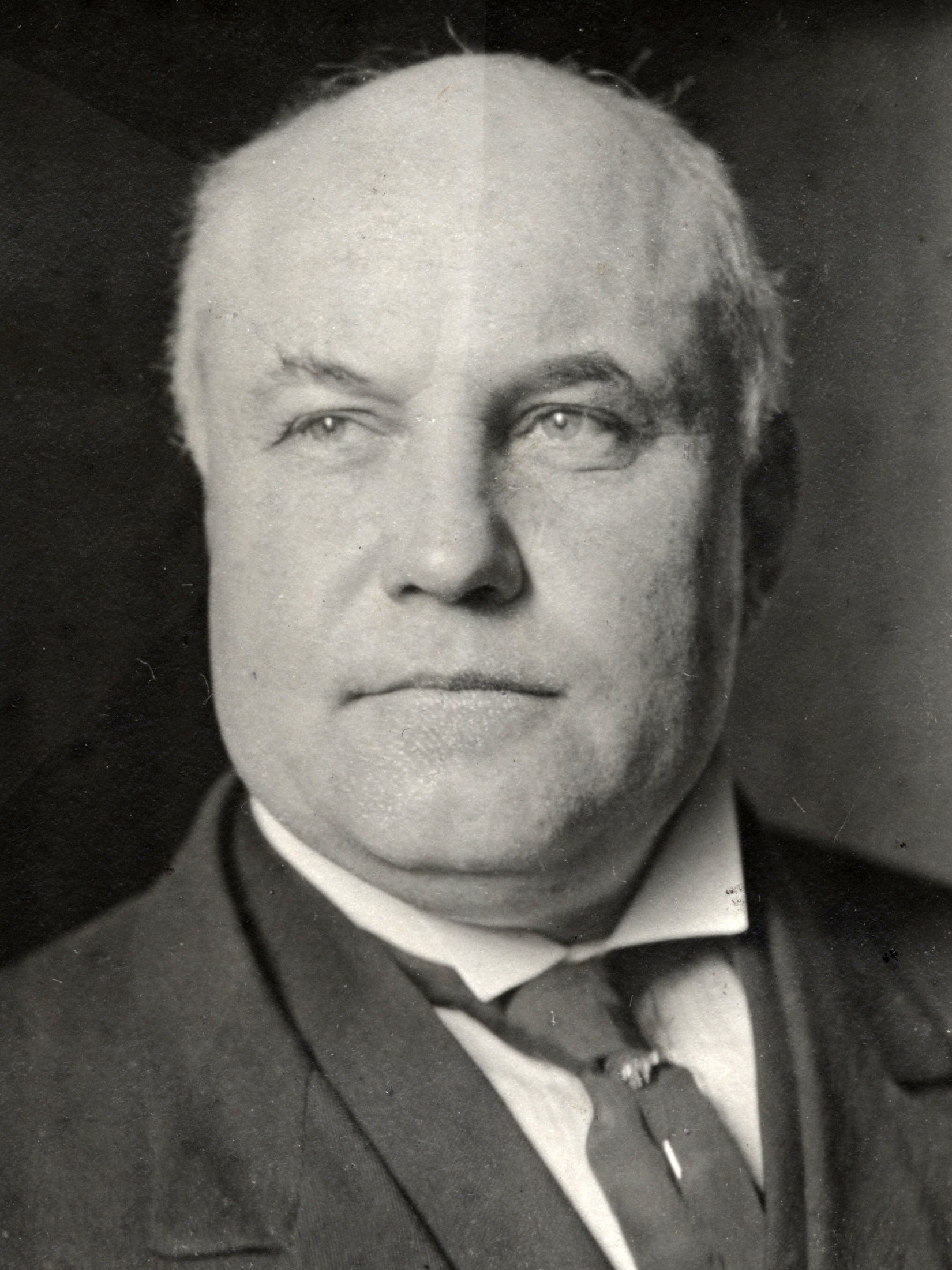

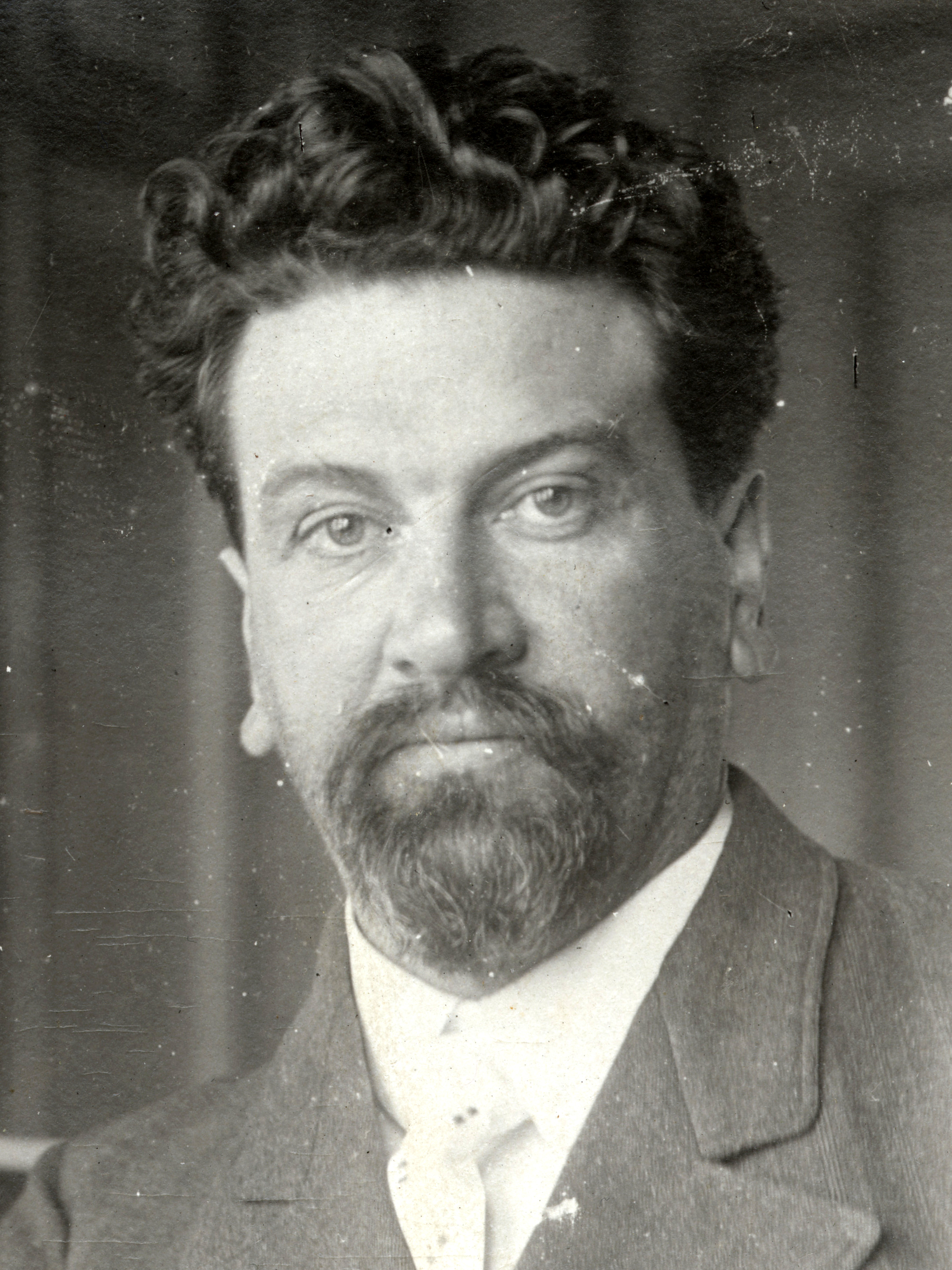
Nominee	George C. Perkins	Franklin K. Lane	Eugene Schmitz
Party	Republican	Democratic	Union Labor
Senate	33	5	1
Percentage	84.62%	12.82%	2.56%
House	58	12	6
Percentage	76.32%	15.79%	7.89%
Senator before election
George C. Perkins
Republican
Elected Senator
George C. Perkins
Republican

The 1903 United States Senate election in California was held on January 13, 1903, by the California State Legislature to elect a U.S. senator (Class 3) to represent the State of California in the United States Senate. Incumbent Republican Senator George Clement Perkins was re-elected to a third term in office, defeating Democratic former San Francisco City Attorney Franklin Knight Lane and Union Labor San Francisco Mayor Eugene Schmitz.

== Results ==
Election in the Senate
Party	Candidate	Votes	%
Republican	George C. Perkins (incumbent)	33	84.62%
Democratic	Franklin Knight Lane	5	12.82%
Union Labor	Eugene Schmitz	1	2.56%
Total votes		39	100.00%

Election in the Assembly
Party	Candidate	Votes	%
Republican	George C. Perkins (incumbent)	58	76.32%
Democratic	Franklin Knight Lane	12	15.79%
Union Labor	Eugene Schmitz	6	7.89%
Total votes		76	100.00%
