= 1897 United States Senate election in California =

- January 12, 1897

Majority vote of each house needed to win
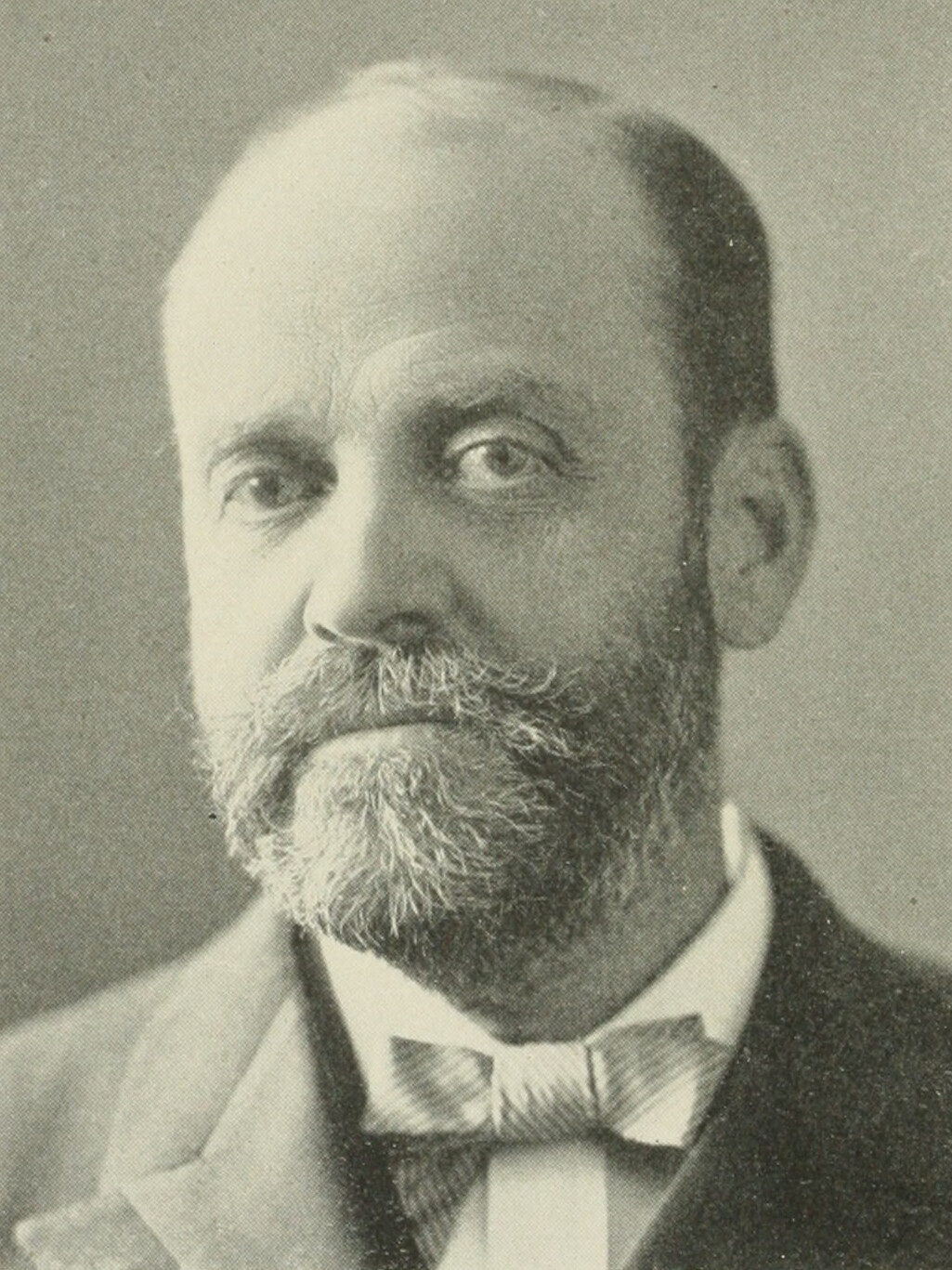

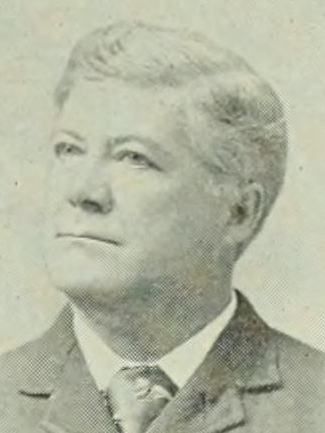

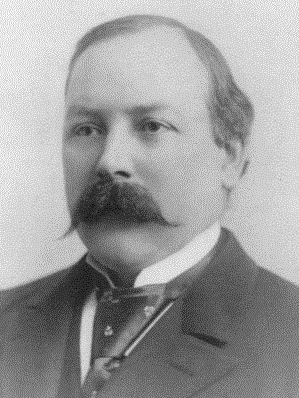

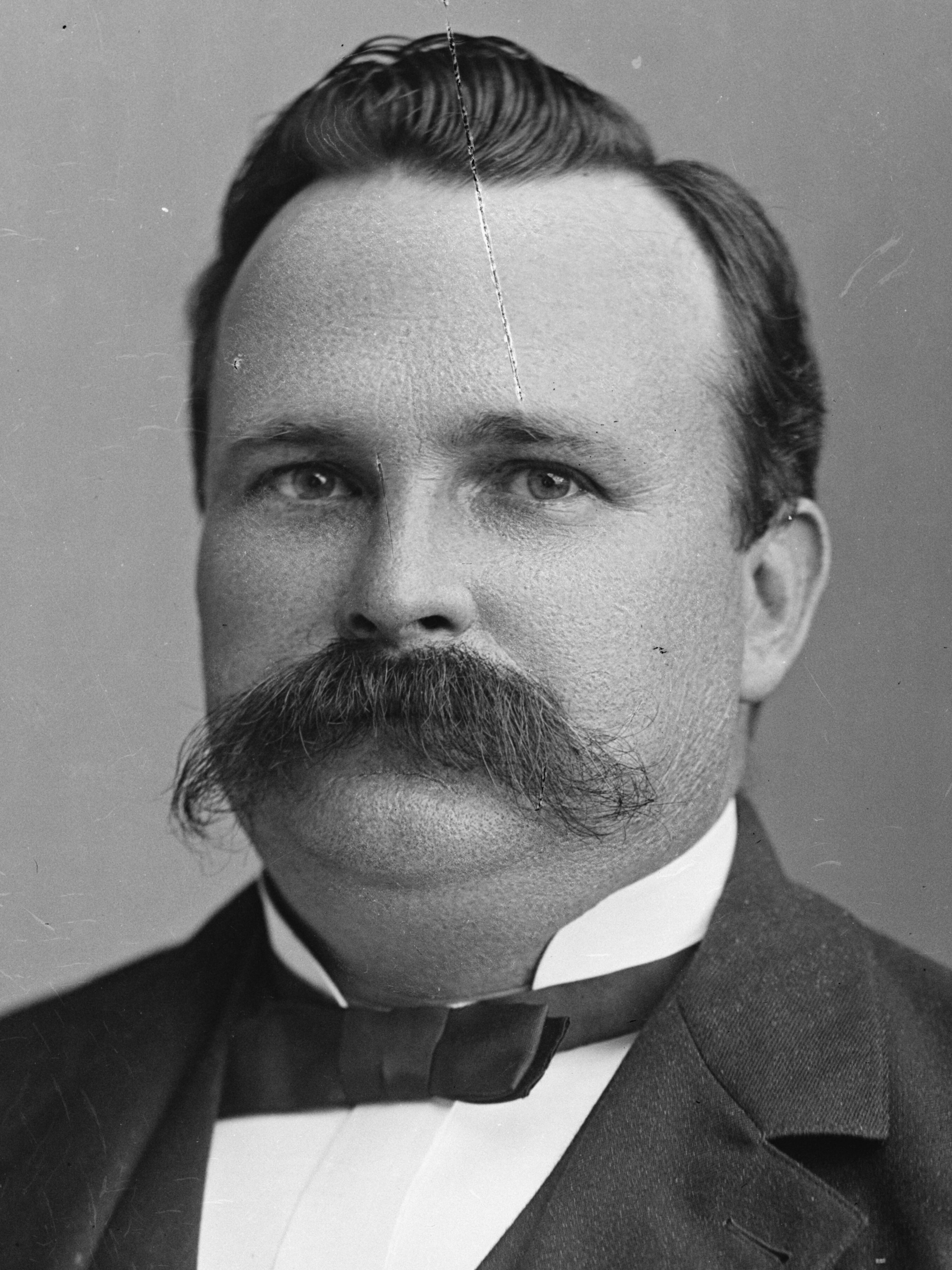

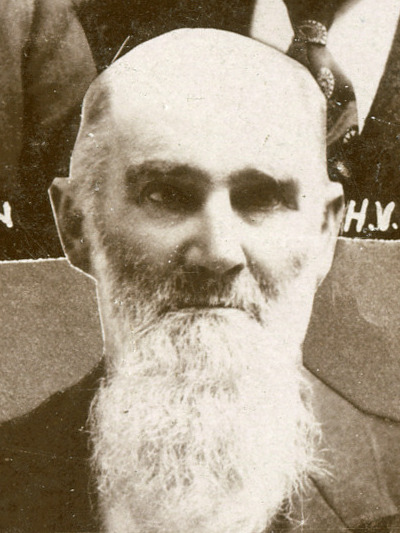
Nominee	George C. Perkins	William W. Foote	John J. Dwyer
Party	Republican	Democratic	Democratic
Senate	27	6	2
Percentage	67.50%	15.00%	5.00%
House	46	3	9
Percentage	58.23%	3.80%	11.39%
Nominee	Thomas V. Cator	James G. Maguire	Benjamin F. Langford
Party	Populist	Democratic	Democratic
Senate	0	0	3
Percentage	0.00%	0.00%	7.50%
House	11	10	0
Percentage	13.92%	12.66%	0.00%
Senator before election
George C. Perkins
Republican
Elected Senator
George C. Perkins
Republican

The 1897 United States Senate election in California was held on January 12, 1897, by the California State Legislature to elect a U.S. senator (Class 3) to represent the State of California in the United States Senate. Incumbent Republican Senator George Clement Perkins was re-elected to a second term in office, defeating several Democratic and Populist challengers.

== Results ==
Election in the Senate
Party	Candidate	Votes	%
Republican	George C. Perkins (incumbent)	27	67.50%
Democratic	William W. Foote	6	15.00%
Democratic	Benjamin F. Langford	3	7.50%
Democratic	John J. Dwyer	2	5.00%
Silver	Charles D. Lane	1	2.50%
Republican	Daniel M. Burns	1	2.50%
Total votes		40	100.00%

Election in the Assembly
Party	Candidate	Votes	%
Republican	George C. Perkins (incumbent)	46	58.23%
Populist	Thomas V. Cator	11	13.92%
Democratic	James G. Maguire	10	12.66%
Democratic	John J. Dwyer	9	11.39%
Democratic	William W. Foote	3	3.80%
Total votes		79	100.00%
