= 1897 United States Senate election in New York =

- January 19, 1897

Majority vote of each house needed to win
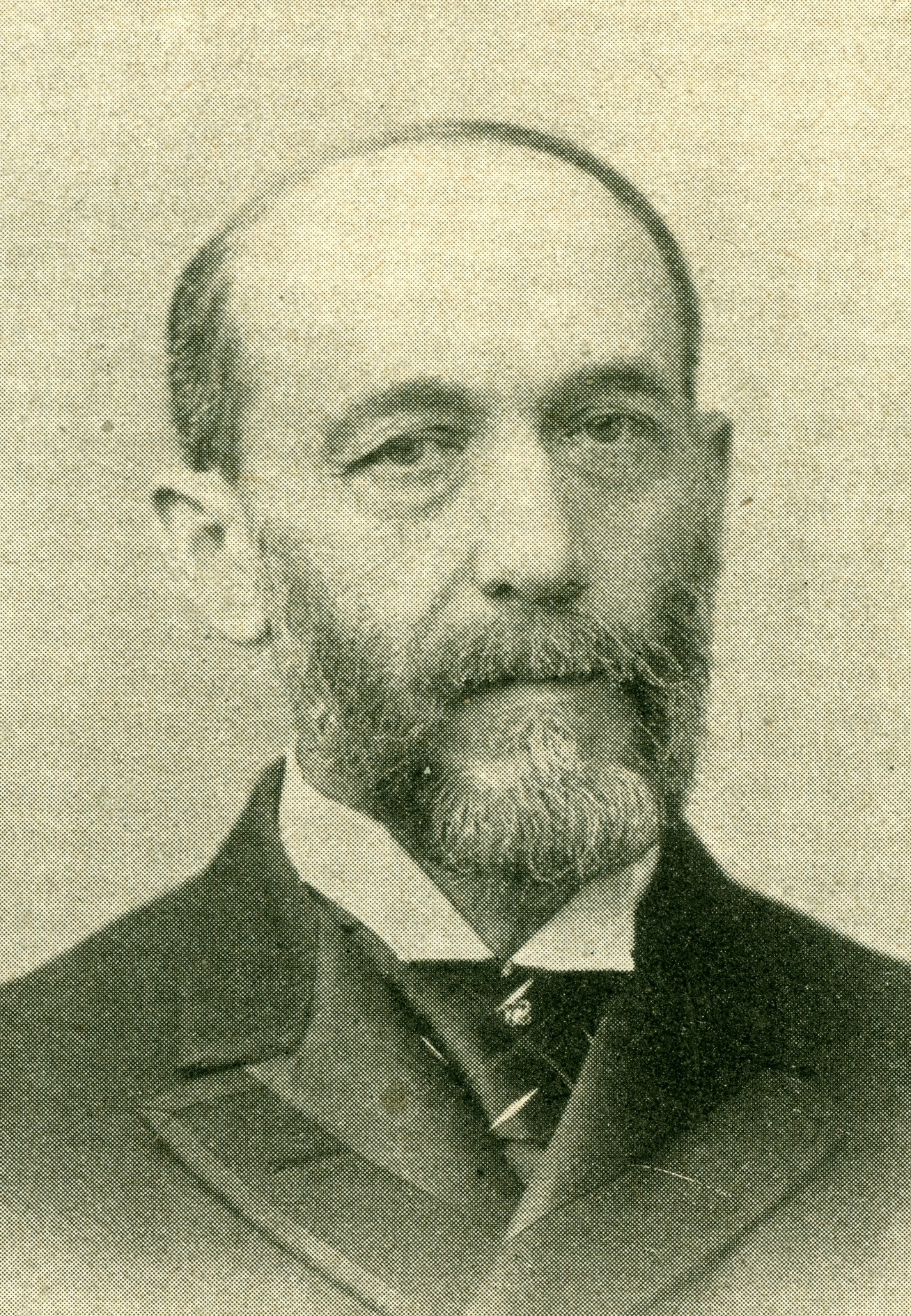

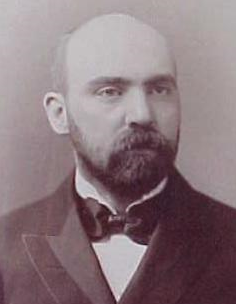
Nominee	Thomas C. Platt	David B. Hill
Party	Republican	Democratic
Senate	35	11
Percentage	72.92%	22.92%
House	112	31
Percentage	77.24%	21.38%
Senator before election
David B. Hill
Democratic
Elected Senator
Thomas C. Platt
Republican

The 1897 United States Senate election in New York was held on January 19, 1897, by the New York State Legislature to elect a U.S. senator (Class 3) to represent the State of New York in the United States Senate.

== Background ==
Democrat David B. Hill had been elected to this seat in 1891 and his term was set to expire on March 3, 1897.

=== Composition of the legislature ===
At the State election in November 1895, 36 Republicans and 14 Democrats were elected for a three-year term (1896–1898) in the state senate. At the State election in November 1896, 114 Republicans and 36 Democrats were elected for the session of 1897 to the Assembly. The 120th New York State Legislature met from January 6 to April 24, 1897, at Albany, New York.

== Candidates ==
=== Republican caucus ===
The Republican caucus met on January 14. 149 State legislators attended, and State Senator Cornelius R. Parsons (43rd D.), Ex-Mayor of Rochester, presided. The caucus nominated the Republican boss Thomas C. Platt, who had been briefly a U.S. Senator in 1881, on the first ballot.

1897 Republican caucus for United States Senator result
Candidate	First ballot
Thomas C. Platt	142
Joseph H. Choate	7

=== Democratic caucus ===
The Democratic caucus met on January 18. 46 State legislators attended, but 5 walked out before the roll was called, after making speeches against Hill. The incumbent U.S. Senator David B. Hill was re-nominated.

1897 Democratic caucus for United States Senator result
Candidate	First ballot
David B. Hill	36
Wilbur F. Porter	3
Robert C. Titus	2

== Result ==
Thomas C. Platt was the choice of both the Assembly and the state senate, and was declared elected. Four anti-Hill Democrats voted for Labor leader Henry George who later the same year ran for Mayor of New York as a "Jefferson Democrat" but died a few days before the election.

1897 United States Senator election result
House	Republican		Democrat			
State Senate (50 members)	Thomas C. Platt	35	David B. Hill	11	Henry George	2
State Assembly (150 members)	Thomas C. Platt	112	David B. Hill	31	Henry George	2

Note: The votes were cast on January 19, but both Houses met in a joint session on January 20 to compare nominations, and declare the result.

== Aftermath ==
Platt was re-elected in 1903, and served two terms, remaining in the U.S. Senate until March 3, 1909.

== See also ==
- United States Senate elections, 1896 and 1897
