= 1897 United States Senate election in Pennsylvania =

- January 20, 1897
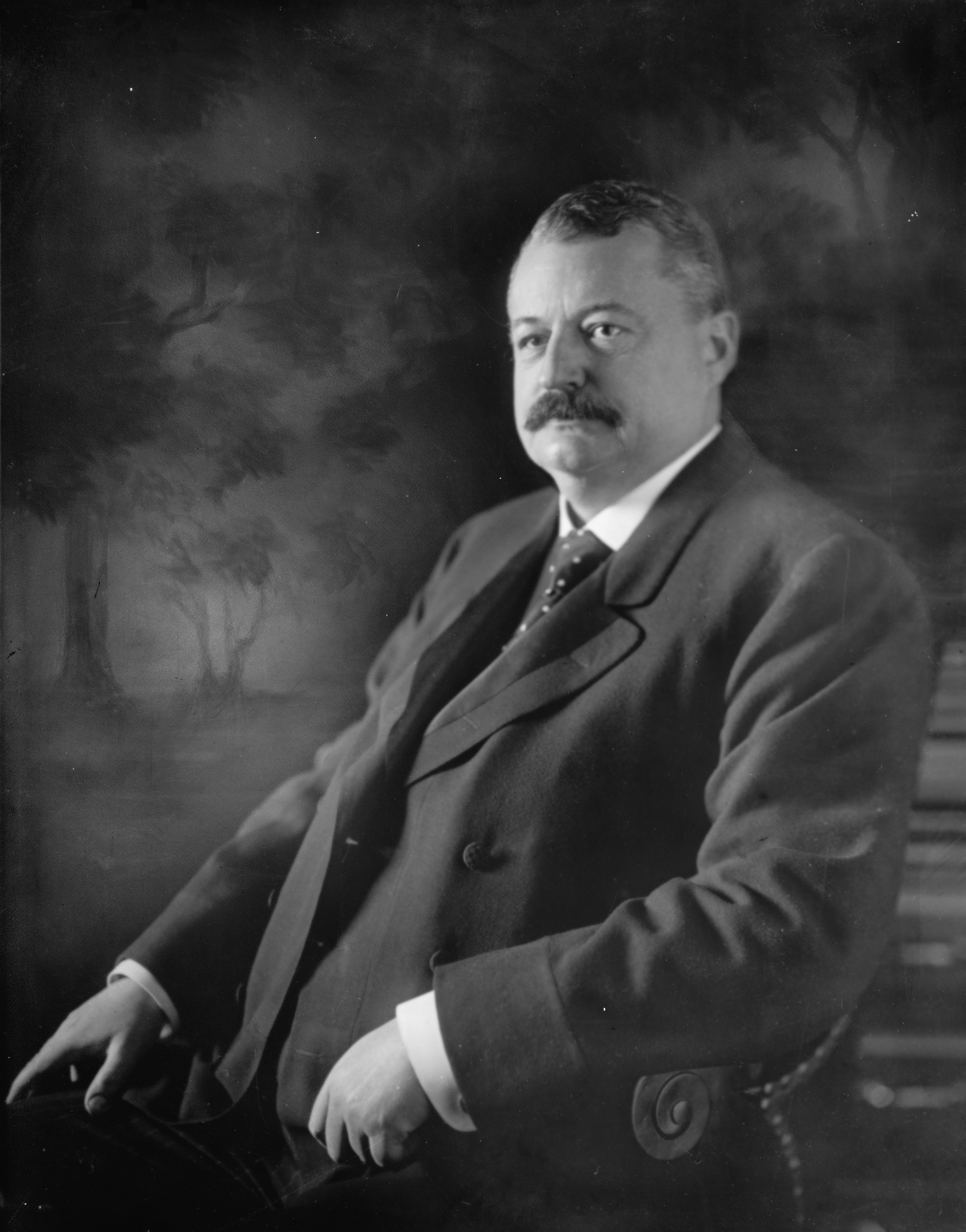

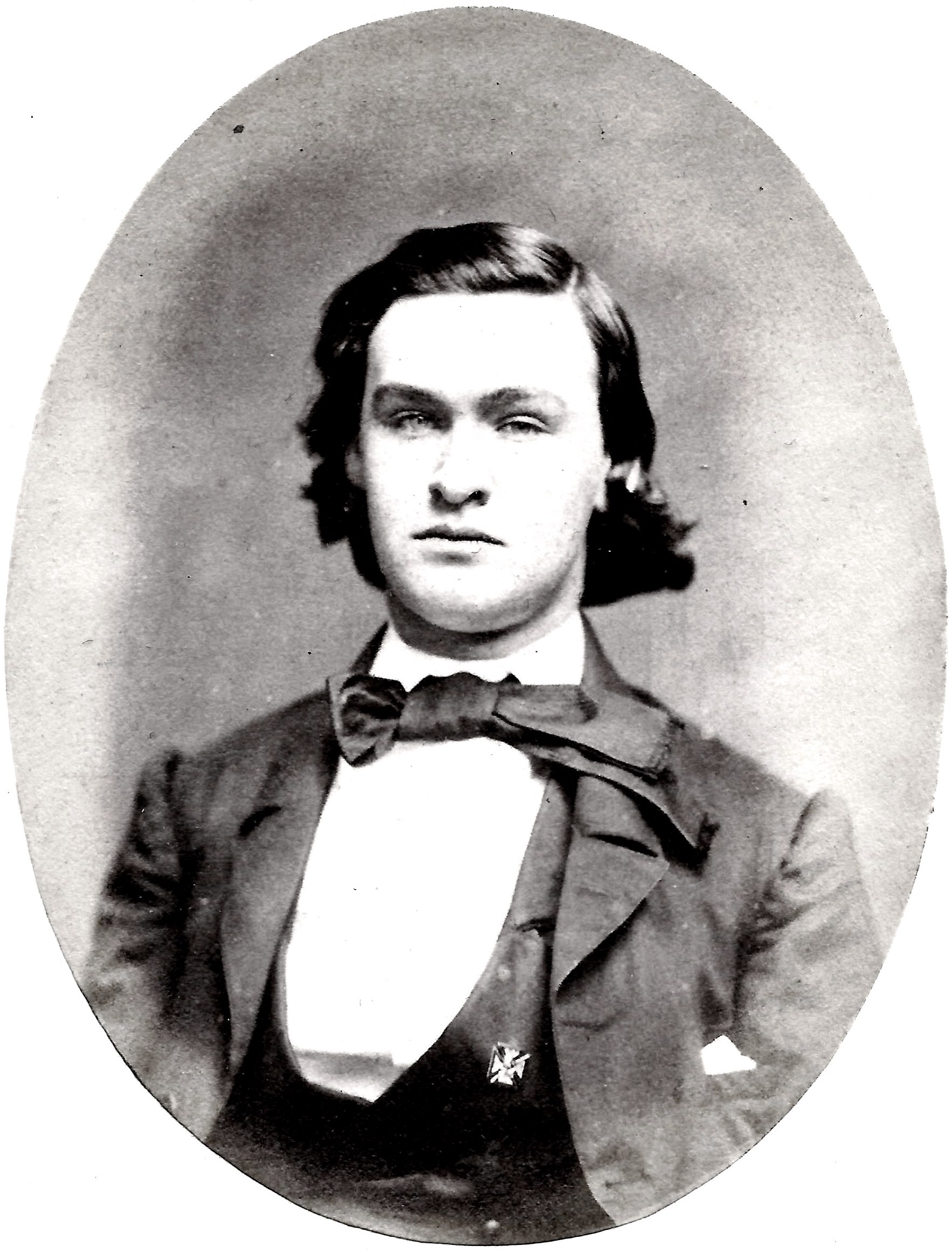
Nominee	Boies Penrose	Chauncey Forward Black
Party	Republican	Democratic
Leg. vote	210	39
Percentage	83.00%	15.42%
U.S. senator before election
J. Donald Cameron
Republican
Elected U.S. Senator
Boies Penrose
Republican

The 1897 United States Senate election in Pennsylvania was held on January 19, 1897. Boies Penrose was elected by the Pennsylvania General Assembly to the United States Senate.

== Results ==
Incumbent Republican J. Donald Cameron, who was elected in an 1877 special election and subsequently re-elected in 1879, 1885 and 1891, was not a candidate for re-election to another term. The Pennsylvania General Assembly, consisting of the House of Representatives and the Senate, convened on January 19, 1897, to elect a new senator to fill the term beginning on March 4, 1897. The results of the vote of both houses combined are as follows:

State legislature results
Party	Candidate	Votes	%
Republican	Boies Penrose	210	83.00
Democratic	Chauncey F. Black	39	15.42
Republican	John Wanamaker	1	0.40
N/A	Not voting	3	1.19
Totals		253	100.00%

== See also ==
- 1896–97 United States Senate elections

Preceded by 1891	Pennsylvania U.S. Senate election (Class III); 1897	Succeeded by 1903
