= Farmers' movement =

Farmers' Movement
- Periods: The Grange (first); Farmers' Alliance (second); Populists (third)
- Prominent members: Oliver Hudson Kelley; William Jennings Bryan; James B. Weaver; Thomas E. Watson; Charles Macune; John Rankin Rogers; Leonidas L. Polk; Marion Butler
- Associated parties: Labor Party; Silver Republican Party; Greenback Party; Silver Party; People's Party
- Founded: 1867
- Dissolved: 1896
- Succeeded by: Progressive movement
- Newspaper: Alliance newspapers
- Ideology: Initial phase: Reformism; Cooperativism; Grassroots democracy Later phase: Agrarianism; Left-wing populism Progressivism; Land reform Monetary reform
- Political position: Left-wing

The farmers' movement was, in American political history, the general name for a movement between 1867 and 1896. In this movement, there were three periods, popularly known as the Grange, Alliance and Populist movements.

== The Grange ==
The Grange, or Order of the Patrons of Husbandry (the latter official name of the national organization, while the former was the name of local chapters, including a supervisory National Grange at Washington), was a secret order founded in 1867 to advance the social needs and combat the economic backwardness of farm life. It was founded by Oliver H. Kelley, at that time an official working in Washington DC for the Department of Agriculture. He had been sent to Virginia to assess Southern agricultural resources and practices. He found them to be generally poor, and became determined to found an organization of farmers for the dissemination of information. As a Government official from the North, he must have received a generally hostile reception, but he was a Mason, and ended by founding his organization on the structure of that order. In addition to farming practices, it was to provide insurance and benevolent aid to members.

Kelley and other leaders promoted the equal status of women. The women formed active auxiliaries.

The Grange grew remarkably during the early years: at its peak, its membership rose to 1.5 million. The causes of its growth were much broader than just the financial crisis of 1873; a high tariff, railway freight rates and other grievances were mingled with agricultural troubles like the fall of wheat prices and the increase of mortgages.

The condition of the farmer seemed desperate. The original objects of the Grange were primarily educational, but these were soon overborne by an anti-middleman, co-operative movement. Grange agents bought everything from farm machinery to women's dresses; hundreds of grain elevators and cotton and tobacco warehouses were bought, and even steamboat lines; mutual insurance companies were formed and joint-stock stores. Nor was co-operation limited to distributive processes; crop reports were circulated, co-operative dairies multiplied, flour mills were operated, and patents were purchased, that the Grange might manufacture farm machinery.

The outcome in some states was ruin, and the name, Grange, became a reproach. Nevertheless, these efforts in co-operation were exceedingly important both for the results obtained and for their wider significance. Nor could politics be excluded, though officially taboo, for economics must be considered by social idealists, and economics everywhere ran into politics. Thus it was with the railway question.

Railways had been extended into frontier states; there were heavy crops in sparsely settled regions where freight-rates were high, so that given the existing distributive system there were over production and waste; there was notorious stock manipulation and discrimination in rates; and the farmers regarded absentee ownership of railways by New York capitalists much as absentee ownership of land has been regarded in Ireland. The Grange officially disclaimed enmity to railways: Though the organization did not attack them, the Grangers, through political farmers clubs and the like, did. In 1867, the Grange began efforts to establish regulation of the railways as common-carriers, by the states. Such laws were known as Granger Laws, and their general principles, endorsed in 1876 by the Supreme Court of the United States, have become an important chapter in the laws of the land.

In a declaration of principles in 1874 Grangers were declared not to be enemies of railroads, and their cause to stand for no communism nor agrarianism. To conservatives, however, cooperation seemed communism, and Grange laws agrarianism; thus, in 1873-1874, the growth of the movement aroused extraordinary interest and much uneasiness. In 1874, the order was reorganized, membership being limited to persons directly interested in the farmers' cause (there had been a millionaire manufacturers Grange on Broadway), and after this there were constant quarrels in the order; moreover, in 1875, the National Grange largely lost control of the state Granges, which discredited the organization by their disastrous co-operation ventures. Thus, by 1876, it had already ceased to be of national political importance.

About 1880, a renaissance began, particularly in the Middle States and New England; this revival was marked by a recurrence to the original social and educational objects. The national Grange and state Granges (in all, or nearly all, of the states) were still active in 1909, especially in the old cultural movement and in such economic movements, notably the improvement of highways as most directly concern the farmers. The initiative and referendum, and other proposals of reform politics in the direction of a democratic advance, also enter in a measure into their propaganda.

== The Alliance ==
The Alliance carried the movement further into economics. The National Farmers Alliance and Industrial Union, formed in 1889, embraced several originally independent organizations (including The Agricultural Wheel) formed from 1873 onwards; it was largely confined to the South and was secret. The National Farmers Alliance, formed in 1880, went back similarly to 1877, was much smaller, Northern and non-secret. The Colored Farmers' National Alliance and Cooperative Union (formed 1888, merged in the above Southern Alliance in 1890) was the second greatest organization. With these three were associated many others, state and national, including an annual, non-partisan, deliberative and advisory Farmers National Congress. The Alliance movement reached its greatest power about 1890, in which year twelve national farmers organizations were represented in conventions in St Louis, and the six leading ones alone probably had a membership of 5,000,000. Membership usually included males or females above 16 years of age. As with the Grange, so in the ends and declarations of the whole later movement, concrete remedial legislation for agricultural or economic ills was mingled with principles of vague radical tendency and with lofty idealism. Thus, the Southern Alliance in 1890 (the chief platforms were the one at Ocala, Florida, and that of 1889 at St Louis, Missouri, in conjunction with the Knights of Labor) declared its principles to be:

(1) To labour for the education of the agricultural classes in the science of economical government in a strictly non-partisan way, and to bring about a more perfect union of such classes. (2) To demand equal rights to all, and special privileges to none. (3) To endorse the motto: In things essential, unity; in all things, charity. (4) To develop a better state, mentally, morally, socially and financially - - - (6) To suppress personal, local, sectional and national prejudices.

For the Southern farmer a chief concrete evil was the crop-lien system, mortgages on their future crops for furnished supplies by which cotton farmers fell into debt to country merchants. In the North, agricultural labor forces opposed a wide range of capitalistic legislation in solidarity with other industries, notably legislation sought by railway owners.

Practically all the great organizations demanded the abolition of national banks, the free coinage of silver, a sufficient issue of government paper money, tariff revision, and a secret ballot (the last was soon realized). Only less commonly demanded were an income tax, taxation of evidence of debt, and government loans on lands. All of these were principles of the two great Alliances (the Northern and the Southern), as were also pure food legislation, abolition of landholding by aliens, reclamation of unused or unearned land grants (to railways, e.g.), and either rigid federal regulation of railways and other means of communication or government ownership thereof. The Southern Alliance put in the forefront a subtreasury scheme according to which cheap loans should be made by government from local sub-treasuries on non-perishable farm products (such as grain and cotton) stored in government warehouses; while the Northern Alliance demanded restriction of the liquor traffic and for (a short time) woman suffrage. Still other issues were a modification of the patent laws (e.g., to prevent the purchase of patents to stifle competition), postal currency exchange, the eight-hour day, inequitable taxation, the single tax on land, trusts, educational qualification for suffrage, direct popular election of federal judges, of senators, and of the president, special-interest lobbying.

== The Populists ==
In 1889-1890, with the rapid growth in membership, the political (non-partisan) movement developed astonishing strength; it captured the Republican stronghold of Kansas, brought the Democratic Party to vassalage in South Carolina, revolutionized legislatures even in conservative states like Massachusetts, and seemed likely completely to dominate the South and West. All its work in the South was accomplished within the old-party organizations, but, in 1890, the demand became strong for an independent third party, for which various consolidations since 1887 had prepared the way. By 1892, a large part of the strength of the farmers organizations, with that of various industrial and radical orders, was united in the People's Party (perhaps more generally known as the Populist Party), which had its beginnings in Kansas in 1890, and received national organization in 1892.

The People's Party emphasized free silver, the income tax, eight-hour day, reclamation of land grants, government ownership of railways, telephones and telegraphs, popular election of federal senators, and the initiative and referendum. In the presidential election of 1892, it cast 1,041,021 votes (in a total of 12,036,089), and elected 22 presidential electors, the first chosen by any third party since 1856. In 1896, the People's Party fused with the Democratic Party in the presidential campaign, and again in 1900. During this period, the greatest part of the People's Party was reabsorbed into the two great parties from which its membership had originally been drawn; in some northern states apparently largely into the Republican ranks, but mainly into the Democratic Party, to which it gave a powerful radical impulse.

== Influence ==
The Farmers' movement was much misunderstood, abused and ridiculed by the societal forces it challenged. However, it accomplished a vast amount of good. The movement—and especially the Grange, for on most important points the latter movements only followed where it had led—contributed the initial impulse and prepared the way for the establishment of traveling and local rural libraries, reading courses, lyceums, farmers institutes (a steadily increasing influence) and rural free mail delivery (inaugurated experimentally in 1896 and adopted as part of the permanent postal system of the country in 1902); for agricultural exhibits and an improved agricultural press; for encouragement to and increased profit from the work of agricultural colleges, the establishment (1885) and great services of the United States Department of Agriculture, -- in short, for an extraordinary lessening of rural isolation and the betterment of the farmers opportunities; for the irrigation of the semi-arid West, adopted as a national policy in 1902, the pure-food laws of 1906, the interstate-commerce law of 1887, the railway-rate laws of 1903 and 1906, even the great Bureau of Commerce-and-Labor law of 1903, and the Anti-trust laws of 1903 and later. The Alliance and Populist movements were bottomed on the idea of "ethical gains through legislation."

In its local manifestations the whole movement was often marked by eccentric ideas, narrow prejudices and weaknesses in economic reasoning. It is not to be forgotten that owing to the movement of the frontier the United States has always been "at once a developed country and a primitive one. The same political questions have been put to a society advanced in some regions and undeveloped in others. ... On specific political questions each economic area has reflected its peculiar interests" (Prof. F.J. Turner). That this idea must not, however, be over-emphasized, is admirably enforced by observing the great mass of farmer radicalism that has, since about 1896, become an accepted Democratic and Republican principle over the whole country. The Farmers movement was the beginning of widespread, effective protest against "the menace of privilege" in the United States.

== See also ==
- American farm discontent
- History of agriculture in the United States
