= Populism in the United States =

Populism in the United States reaches back to the presidency of Andrew Jackson in the 1830s and to the People's Party in the 1890s. It made a resurgence in 2010s–2020s politics, not only in the United States but in democracies around the world. Populism is an approach to politics which views "the people" as being opposed to "the elite" and is often used synonymously with "anti-establishment". As an ideology, populism transcends the typical divisions of left and right and has become more prevalent in the U.S. with a rise in voter apathy toward, and alienation from, the prevailing political system. The definition of populism is a complex one due to its mercurial nature; it has been defined by many different scholars with varying focuses on political, economic, social and cultural features. Populism is often split into two categories in the U.S.: one that emphasizes economics and one that emphasizes culture.

== Overview ==
A division of American populism into two strains has been suggested: one being an economic form of populism opposed to financial elites, and the other being a cultural populism opposed to intellectual elitism. The economic strain is claimed to have a longer history, including the likes of Andrew Jackson and William Jennings Bryan, while cultural populism is recognized as starting in the 1960s with George Wallace. The early 21st-century rise in populism, on both sides of the political spectrum, reportedly stemmed from voter disenchantment with the current governmental system and those running it. Populism is said to play a constitutive role in U.S. political realignments, in which moral boundaries between groups are redrawn and categories of "us" and "them" emerge.

Political scientists have noted that the variety of populism in the early 21st century has somewhat different characteristics than in the past, with a diminished focus on the general population protesting against the elites. Instead, America's populist politicians embrace polarization, seeking a simple governing majority (thus leading to the "tyranny of the majority") that will cater to its base of supporters, but with little interest in appeasing the opposition. Political scientist Benjamin Moffitt argues that 21st century populists such as Donald Trump garner support by radically simplifying the terms of the socioeconomic crises, discussing them in the context of emergency politics, whilst offering a short-term response—appealing to supporters and setting such populists apart from the establishment.

== Populists in American politics ==
=== Andrew Jackson ===
Andrew Jackson was the president from 1829 to 1837 and at the time was called the "People's President". His presidency was characterized by an opposition to institutions, disestablishing the Second Bank of the United States (a central bank), and disregarding the Supreme Court of the United States. Jackson argued that "It is to be regretted that the rich and powerful too often bend the acts of government to their selfish purposes."

=== The People's Party and William Jennings Bryan ===
The People's Party, also known as the Populist Party or simply the Populists, was a left-wing populist and agrarian political party in the United States in the late 19th century. The Populist Party emerged in the early 1890s as an important force in the Southern and Western United States but fell apart after it nominated William Jennings Bryan as the Democratic Party nominee in the 1896 presidential election. A small faction of the party continued to operate into the first decade of the 20th century but never matched the popularity of the party in the early 1890s. The Populist Party's roots lay in the Farmers' Alliance, an agrarian movement that promoted economic action during the Gilded Age, as well as the Greenback Party, an earlier third party that had advocated fiat money. The success of Farmers' Alliance candidates in the 1890 U.S. elections, along with the conservatism of both major parties, encouraged Farmers' Alliance leaders to establish a full-fledged third party before the 1892 U.S. elections. The Ocala Demands laid out the Populist platform: collective bargaining, federal regulation of railroad rates, an expansionary monetary policy, and a Sub-Treasury Plan that required the establishment of federally controlled warehouses to aid farmers. Other Populist-endorsed measures included bimetallism, a graduated income tax, direct election of Senators, a shorter workweek, and the establishment of a postal savings system. These measures were collectively designed to curb the influence of monopolistic corporate and financial interests and empower small businesses, farmers and laborers.

In the 1892 presidential election, the Populist ticket of James B. Weaver and James G. Field won 8.5% of the popular vote and carried four small Western states. Despite the support of labor organizers like Eugene V. Debs and Terence V. Powderly, the party largely failed to win the vote of urban laborers in the Midwest and the Northeast. Over the next four years, the party continued to run state and federal candidates, building up powerful organizations in several Southern and Western states. Before the 1896 presidential election, the Populists became increasingly polarized between "fusionists", who wanted to nominate a joint presidential ticket with the Democratic Party, and "mid-roaders", like Mary Elizabeth Lease, who favored the continuation of the Populists as an independent third party. After the 1896 Democratic National Convention nominated Bryan, a prominent bimetallist, the Populists also nominated Bryan but rejected the Democratic vice-presidential nominee in favor of party leader Thomas E. Watson. In the 1896 election, Bryan swept the South and West but lost to Republican William McKinley by a decisive margin. After the 1896 presidential election, the Populist Party suffered a nationwide collapse. The party nominated presidential candidates in the three presidential elections after 1896 but none came close to matching Weaver's performance in 1892. Former Populists became inactive or joined other parties. Debs became a socialist leader. Bryan dropped any connection to the rump Populist Party.

Historians see the Populists as a reaction to the power of corporate interests in the Gilded Age but debate the degree to which the Populists were anti-modern and nativist. Scholars also continue to debate the magnitude of influence the Populists exerted on later organizations and movements, such as the Progressives of the early 20th century (Progressive Era). Most of the Progressives, such as Theodore Roosevelt, Robert M. La Follette, and Woodrow Wilson, were bitter enemies of the Populists. In American political rhetoric, populist was originally associated with the Populist Party and related left-wing movements; beginning in the 1950s, it began to take on a more generic meaning, describing any anti-establishment movement regardless of its position on the left–right political spectrum. According to Gene Clanton's study of Kansas from 1880s to 1910s, populism and Progressivism in Kansas had similarities but different policies and distinct bases of support. Both opposed corruption and trusts. Populism emerged earlier and came out of the farm community. It was radically egalitarian in favor of the disadvantaged classes; it was weak in the towns and cities except in labor unions. On the other hand, Progressivism was a later movement. It emerged after the 1890s from the urban business and professional communities. Most of its activists had opposed populism. It was elitist and emphasized education and expertise. Its goals were to enhance efficiency, reduce waste, and enlarge the opportunities for upward social mobility; however, some former Populists changed their emphasis after 1900 and supported progressive reforms.

=== Huey Long ===
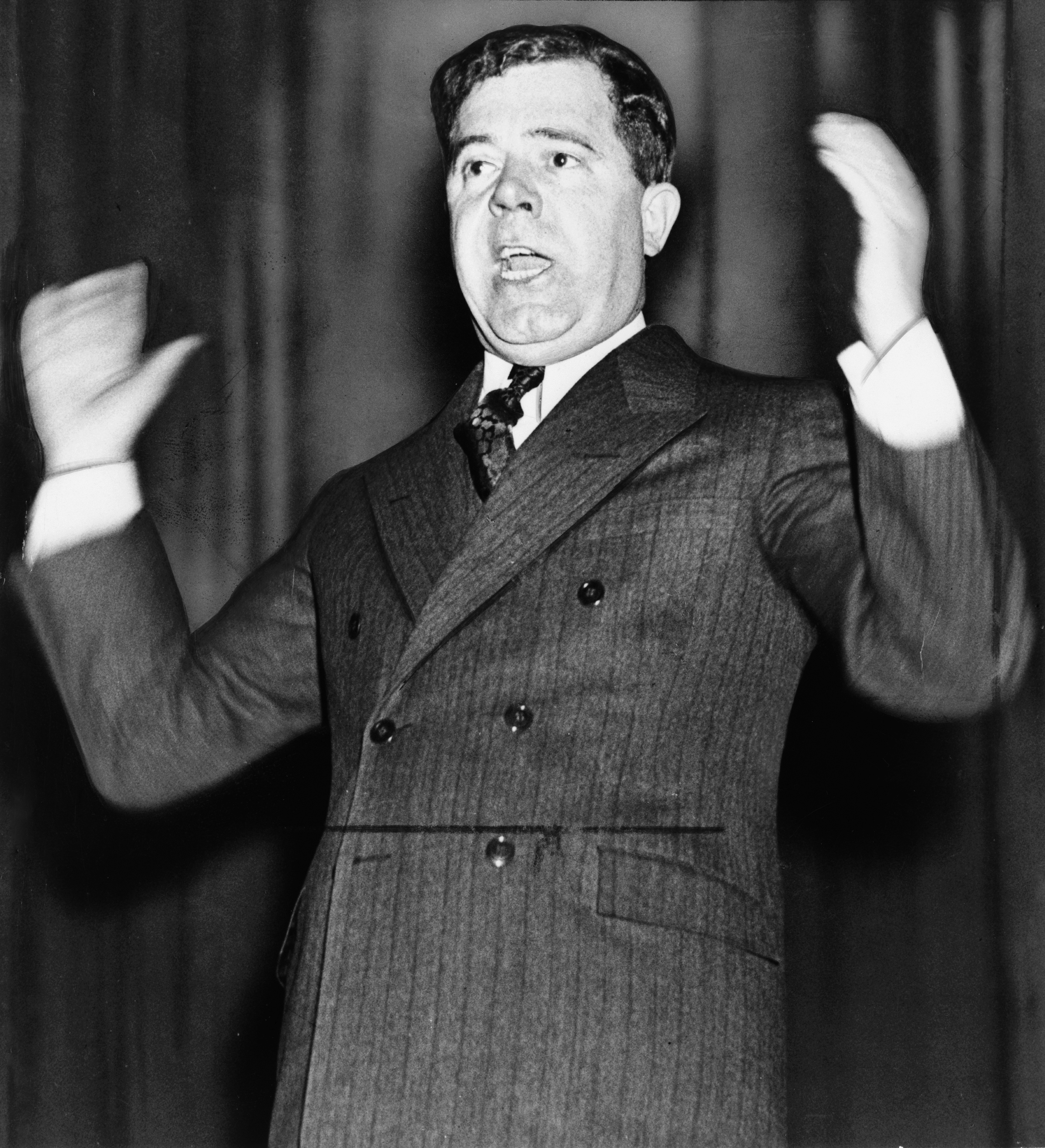
Huey P. Long in 1935

Huey Long was the governor of Louisiana (1928–1932) and a U.S. senator (1932–1935). He has been referred to as a demagogue and a populist, with his slogan being "every man a king". He advocated for wealth redistribution through the Share Our Wealth initiative. After announcing a bid to run in the 1936 presidential election, he was assassinated. The initiative aimed to end the depression by ‘breaking the power of the rich’. This set out by Long, intended to limit the wealth of individuals through taxation whilst providing a ‘homestead’ (financial aid) to people to climb up the economic ladder. No clear plan was made to enforce and institutionalise these proposed changes which led to the plans ultimate fail. Long's charisma and ability in his speeches were the most central part to this movement and a general trend amongst populist figures.

=== George Wallace ===
George Wallace was a governor of Alabama who ran for president four times, seeking the Democratic Party nomination in 1964, 1972, and 1976, as well as being the candidate for the American Independent Party in the 1968 presidential election. In 1972, he was shot five times while campaigning and left paralyzed from the waist down. His main political ambition was to protect segregation, proclaiming, "say segregation now, segregation tomorrow, segregation forever". He also singled out "pointy-headed intellectuals" and "briefcase-toting bureaucrats", leading to his being labeled a populist. His popular and charismatic approach during his rallies and speeches allowed him to capture the voice and support of the white working class in this period. He also assumed the role of the voice of white working-class conservatism in which, we see "the triumph of Wallace-style Conservatism in American Politics." His personal ambitions largely around segregation and anti-elite sentiment oriented his supporters toward a politics of exclusion with regards to who they consider part of "the people" Wallace set out to protect.

=== Ross Perot ===
Ross Perot has been associated with American populism and has been called a "billionaire populist". He ran as a third-party candidate in the 1992 presidential election, gaining 19 million votes. Among his policy proposals was the instalment of e-democracy for direct democratic decision-making. He ran again as a third-party candidate in the 1996 presidential election, gaining 8 million votes.

Donald Trump later considered running for Perot's Reform Party in the 2000 presidential election.

=== Sarah Palin ===
Sarah Palin was the governor of Alaska from 2006 to 2009 and the vice-presidential candidate for the 2008 presidential election. She has been referred to as a cultural populist in the vein of Wallace.

=== Donald Trump ===
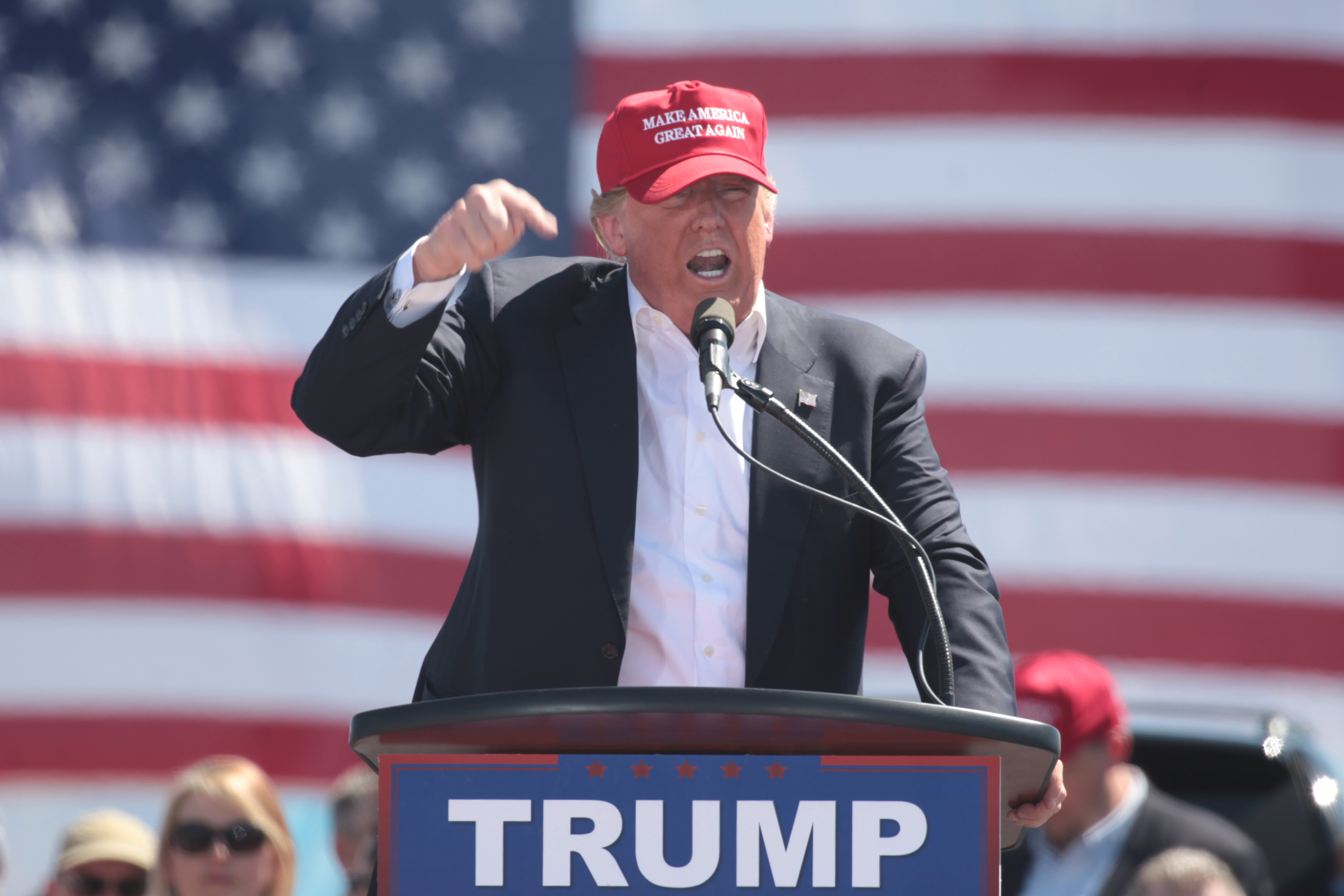
Donald Trump

Donald Trump, president from 2017 to 2021 and since 2025, has been referred to as a populist. His rhetoric presented him as a leader who "alone can fix" the problems of American politics and represent the "forgotten men and women of our country", with echoes of the populism of Jackson's presidency. Trump's modern populism is argued to show the symbiotic relationship between nationalism and populism. Moreover, the rise of Trump's election was argued by some scholars to represent the "tyranny of the majority", whereby Trump's attacks on liberal and progressive politics allowed him to gain enough voters to win, so he did not need to appease the majority of voters or be a president for "every American".

=== Bernie Sanders ===
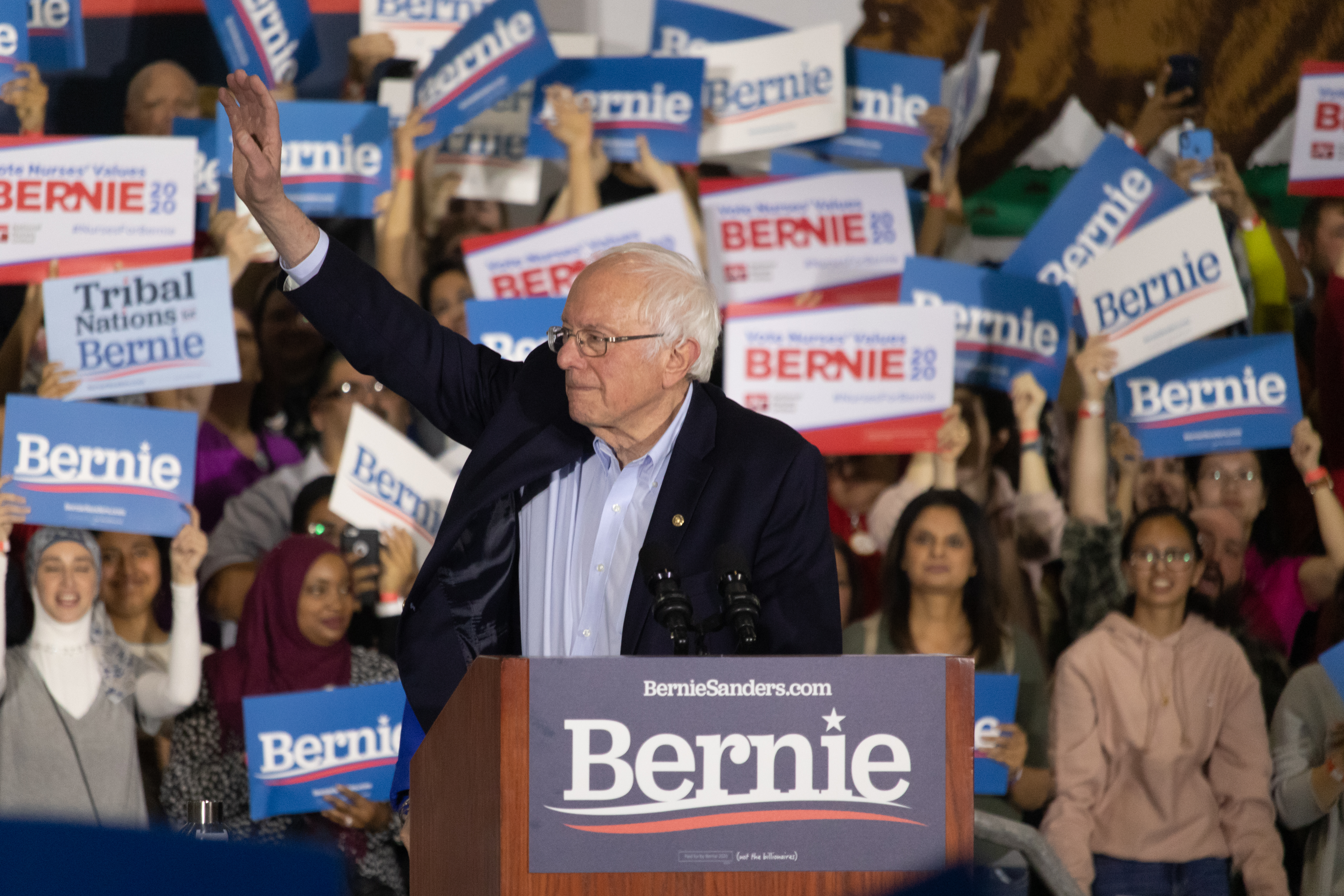
Bernie Sanders, senior United States senator from Vermont and two-time presidential candidate in 2016 and 2020

Bernie Sanders has been called a populist from the opposite side of the political spectrum to Trump, with many differences between the two. Sanders' populism is opposed to political, corporate, and media elites, especially the American financial industry epitomized by Wall Street, as well as the wealthiest one percent. After he did not win the Democratic nomination for president in the 2016 Democratic Party presidential primaries, he was re-elected as an independent senator for his home state Vermont in 2018 and 2024. Other Democratic politicians in Sanders' vein include Elizabeth Warren and Alexandria Ocasio-Cortez.

Sanders ran again in the Democratic nomination for president in the 2020 Democratic Party presidential primaries, suspending his campaign after several significant losses to Joe Biden in that year's Democratic primaries.

== See also ==
- Anti-intellectualism in American Life
- The Paranoid Style in American Politics
- Political culture of the United States
- Working class in the United States
- Pat Buchanan
