= Omaha Platform =

1892 Populist Party political platform

The Omaha Platform was the party program adopted at the formative convention of the Populist (or People's) Party held in Omaha, Nebraska on July 4, 1892.

== Origin ==
The platform preamble was written by Ignatius L. Donnelly. The Omaha platform was seen as "The Second Declaration of Independence," as it called for reestablishing American liberty. The agenda represented the merger of three planks: the agrarian concerns of the Farmers' Alliance with the free-currency monetarism of the Greenback Party while explicitly endorsing the goals of the largely urban Knights of Labor. In the words of Donnelly's preamble, the convention was "assembled on the anniversary of the birthday of the nation, and filled with the spirit of the grand general and chieftain who established our independence, we seek to restore the government of the Republic to the hands of the plain people, with which class it originated."

The Omaha Platform called for a wide range of social reforms, including

- a reduction in the working day,
- a "safe, sound, and flexible" national currency,
- assistance to farmers with the financing of their labours,
- "fair and liberal pensions to ex-Union soldiers and sailors,"
- the direct election of Senators,
- single-terms for Presidents and Vice-Presidents,
- "the legislative system known as the initiative and referendum,"
- "the unperverted Australian of secret ballot system,"
- the nationalization of the railroads, the telegraph, and the telephone systems,
- a postal savings,
- "a graduated income tax," and
- "the free and unlimited coinage of silver."

In referencing the Omaha Platform, Senator George W. Norris of Nebraska suggested the wealth of the "super rich" had to begin flowing "to all the people, from whom it was originally taken."

The Populist, or People's, Party went on to capture 11 seats in the United States House of Representatives, several governors and the state legislatures of Kansas, Nebraska and North Carolina. 1892 Presidential nominee and former Greenbacker James B. Weaver received over a million popular votes, and won four states (Colorado, Kansas, Idaho, and Nevada) and 22 electoral votes. The Party's legislative majorities were thereafter able to elect several United States Senators. Taken as a whole, the electoral accomplishments of the Populist Party represent the high water mark for a United States third party after the Civil War. In 1896, the Populists abandoned the Omaha Platform and endorsed Democratic nominee William Jennings Bryan on the basis of a single-plank free silver platform.

== Goals ==
The first goal of the Omaha Platform was to increase the coinage of silver and gold at a 16:1 ratio. The Omaha Platform suggested a federal loans system so that farmers could get the money they needed. The platform also called for the elimination of private banks. The platform proposed a system of federal storage facilities for the farmers' crops. The objective was to allow the farmers to control the pricing of their products. The Omaha Platform proposed a special taxing system for them so that they would have to pay taxes depending on how much money they made. They also sought for an eight-hour workday and the direct election of senators, as opposed to their being elected by state legislatures. These main goals of the Omaha Platform were all focused on helping rural and working-class Americans. After 1894, Populists emphasized the demand for free coinage of silver rather than other goals, such as state-run railroads.

== Dissolution ==
The platform did not appeal to the more urban areas of the country where wage earners were working industrial jobs. The platform's only clear attempt to appeal to northerners in the east was the clause mentioning pensions to ex-Union soldiers. The Populist Party dissolved before World War II as members were unable to meet in Omaha for the party's semi-centennial celebration, and for the reason that many of the party's values have been accepted by other, more dominant political parties.

== See also ==
- Ocala Demands

== Sources ==
- http://www.losal.org/cms/lib7/CA01000497/Centricity/Domain/340/The_Omha_Platform_-_Summary.pdf
- http://historymatters.gmu.edu/d/5361/
- http://study.com/academy/lesson/the-omaha-platform-of-1892-definition-goals.html
- The World Almanac, 1893 (New York: 1893), 83–85. Reprinted in George Brown Tindall, ed., A Populist Reader, Selections from the Works of American Populist Leaders (New York: Harper & Row, 1966), 90–96.
- National Economist. Publication of the Farmers Alliance. Washington, DC., July 9, 1892.
- People's Party Platform, Omaha Morning World-Herald, 5 July 1892.
- Kazin, Michael (1995). The Populist Persuasion. New York: BasicBooks. p. 43
