= Political interpretations of The Wonderful Wizard of Oz =

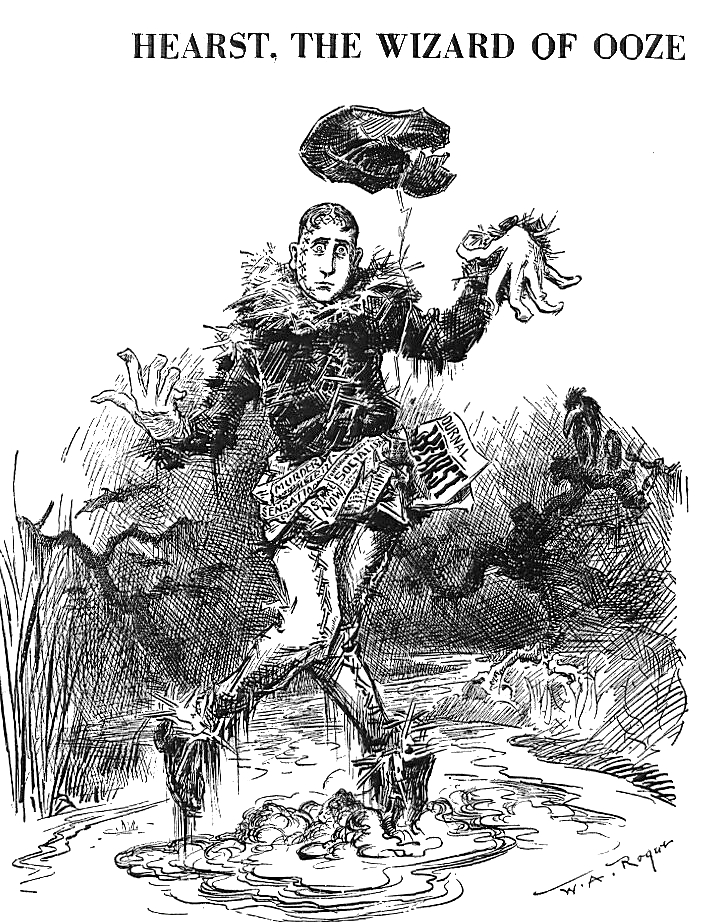
Cartoonist William Allen Rogers in 1906 sees the political uses of Oz: he depicts William Randolph Hearst as Scarecrow stuck in his own Ooze in Harper's Weekly

Political interpretations of The Wonderful Wizard of Oz include treatments of the modern fairy tale (written by L. Frank Baum and first published in 1900) as an allegory or metaphor for the political, economic, and social events of America in the 1890s. Scholars have examined four quite different versions of Oz: the novel of 1900, the Broadway play of 1902, the Hollywood film of 1939, and the numerous follow-up Oz novels written after 1900 by Baum and others.

The political interpretations focus on the first three, and emphasize the close relationship between the visual images and the storyline to the political interests of the day. Biographers report that Baum had been a political activist in the 1890s with a special interest in the money question of gold and silver (bimetallism), and the illustrator William Wallace Denslow was a full-time editorial cartoonist for a major daily newspaper. For the 1902 Broadway production, Baum inserted explicit references to prominent political characters such as then-president Theodore Roosevelt.

== Monetary policy ==
In a 1964 article, educator and historian Henry Littlefield outlined an allegory in the book of the late-19th-century debate regarding monetary policy. According to this view, for instance, the Yellow Brick Road represents the gold standard, and the Silver Shoes (Ruby slippers in the 1939 film version) represent the Silverites' wish to maintain convertibility under a sixteen to one ratio (dancing down the road). Hugh Rockoff suggested the City of Oz earns its name from the abbreviation of ounces "Oz" in which gold and silver are measured.

The thesis achieved considerable popular interest and elaboration by many scholars in history, economics and other fields, but that thesis has been challenged. Certainly the 1902 musical version of Oz, written by Baum, was for an adult audience and had numerous explicit references to contemporary politics, though in these references Baum seems just to have been "playing for laughs". The 1902 stage adaptation mentioned, by name, President Theodore Roosevelt and other political celebrities. For example, the Tin Woodman wonders what he would do if he ran out of oil. "You wouldn't be as badly off as John D. Rockefeller", the Scarecrow responds, "He'd lose six thousand dollars a minute if that happened."

Littlefield's knowledge of the 1890s was thin, and he made numerous errors, but since his article was published, scholars in history, political science, and economics have asserted that the images and characters used by Baum closely resemble political images that were well known in the 1890s, some overlapping with his monetary reform tack. Quentin Taylor, for example, claimed that many of the events and characters of the book resemble the actual political personalities, events and ideas of the 1890s. Dorothy—naïve, young and simple—represents the American people. She is Everyman, led astray and seeking the way back home. Moreover, following the road of gold leads eventually only to the Emerald City, which Taylor sees as symbolic of a fraudulent world built on greenback paper money, a fiat currency that cannot be redeemed in exchange for precious metals. It is ruled by a scheming politician (the Wizard) who uses publicity devices and tricks to fool the people (and even the Good Witches) into believing he is benevolent, wise, and powerful when really he is a selfish, evil humbug. He sends Dorothy into severe danger hoping she will rid him of his enemy the Wicked Witch of the West. He is powerless and, as he admits to Dorothy, "I'm a very bad Wizard".

Hugh Rockoff suggested in 1990 that the novel was an allegory about the demonetization of silver in 1873, whereby "the cyclone that carried Dorothy to the Land of Oz represents the economic and political upheaval, the yellow brick road stands for the gold standard, and the silver shoes Dorothy inherits from the Wicked Witch of the East represents the pro-silver movement. When Dorothy is taken to the Emerald Palace before her audience with the Wizard she is led through seven passages and up three flights of stairs, a subtle reference to the Coinage Act of 1873 which started the class conflict in America."

Ruth Kassinger, in her book Gold: From Greek Myth to Computer Chips, purports that "The Wizard symbolizes bankers who support the gold standard and oppose adding silver to it ...." And the fact that "Only Dorothy's silver slippers can take her home to Kansas," is meant to indicate that just as Dorothy did not realize that she had the silver slippers the whole time, Dorothy, or 'the westerners', did not realize they already had a viable currency of the people.

== Social groups ==
Historian Quentin Taylor sees additional metaphors, including:

- The Scarecrow as a representation of American farmers and their troubles in the late 19th century
- The Tin Man representing the American steel industry's failures to combat increased international competition at the time.
- The Cowardly Lion as a metaphor for the American military's performance in the Spanish–American War.

Taylor also claimed a sort of iconography for the cyclone: it was used in the 1890s as a metaphor for a political revolution that would transform the drab country into a land of color and unlimited prosperity. It was also used by editorial cartoonists of the 1890s to represent political upheaval.

Dorothy would represent the goodness and innocence of human kind.

Literary scholar Brian Attebery claimed Mary Elizabeth Lease, a leading activist for the People's Party (Populist) and proto-feminist, to have been the model for Dorothy.

Others posit that the Tin Man represents the industrial or factory worker, and the Cowardly Lion is a stand-in for William Jennings Bryan or pusillanimous politicians in general.

Other putative allegorical devices of the book include the Wicked Witch of the West as a figure for the actual American West; if this is true, then the Winged Monkeys could represent another western danger: Native Americans. The King of the Winged Monkeys tells Dorothy, "Once we were a free people, living happily in the great forest, flying from tree to tree, eating nuts and fruit and doing just as we pleased without calling anybody master. ... This was many years ago, long before Oz came out of the clouds to rule over this land."

Baum called for total extermination of Native Americans, simultaneously condemning their treatment by white settlers, in two editorials published in his newspaper, The Aberdeen Saturday Pioneer, in 1890 and 1891. Some commenters argue that passages in The Wonderful Wizard of Oz, published almost a decade later, reflect nuance with regard to the plight of Native Americans, containing allegorical references to their treatment. In particular, an incident in which Dorothy and company are accosted by “policemen of the forest” and break a cow's leg and a village church while passing through a strange land “painted in the brightest colors” is suggested to refer to the 1854 Grattan Massacre, precipitated by a missing cow, and the suppression of the Ghost Dance religion respectively. Dorothy responds that they were “lucky in not doing these little people any more harm.”

Baum was also influenced by his mother-in-law, activist Matilda Joslyn Gage, who convinced him to write down his Oz stories. Gage has been cited as one of the inspirations for Dorothy, and biographers have drawn correlations between Baum's Good Witch and Gage's feminist writings.

== Alternative allegory ==
Other writers have used the same evidence to lead to precisely opposite allegorical interpretations.

Apart from intentional symbolism, scholars have speculated on the sources of Baum's ideas and imagery. The "man behind the curtain" could be a reference to automated store window displays of the sort famous at Christmas season in big city department stores; many people watching the fancy clockwork motions of animals and mannequins thought there must be an operator behind the curtain pulling the levers to make them move (Baum was the editor of the trade magazine read by window dressers).

Additional allegories have been developed, without claims that they were originally intended by Baum. The text has been treated as a theosophical allegory. In a 2020 edition of the Rose Croix Journal, an article written by Timothy J. Ryan argues The Wonderful Wizard of Oz is "an allegory of the mystic's journey, using classic alchemical symbols and operations as Dorothy sojourns along the golden path toward reintegration and the discovery of the Philosopher's Stone." L. Frank Baum was a member of the Theosophical Society and a student of Helena Blavatsky, along with his mother-in-law Matilda Joslyn Gage, the famous American suffragist. The paper draws parallels from theosophical teachings and Baum's own life to suggest the Emerald City is an allusion to the Emerald Tablet, and that Dorothy's journey through Oz closely follows the seven stages of alchemy, from calcination to coagulation.

Another direct analogy for "the man behind the curtain" is Mark Hanna, the political strategist behind the national realignment in the Election of 1896.

In 1993, W. Geoffrey Seeley recast the story as an exercise in geo-political treachery, suggesting the supposed "Good Witch Glinda" took advantage of the Witch of the East's sudden and unintentional death. Seizing on an opportunity for all-power, Glinda used the innocent Dorothy to unseat the remaining powers of the land, the Witch of the West and the Wizard of Oz, leaving herself as undisputed master of all four corners of Oz: North, East, West and South (and presumably the Emerald City). She even showed her truest "Machiavellian brilliance" by allowing the story to be entitled after the weakest of her three opponents. Glinda could have told Dorothy that the "silver slippers would easily do the job [of returning Dorothy to her beloved home] but decided that a destabilizing force such as Dorothy might be just the thing to shake up her other rival [The Wizard of Oz]."

Another interpretation that has gained wide traction in recent years is that Baum's book may be an allegory for feminism. Pundits who subscribe to this theory point to several factors that support this theory. For example, all of the characters in The Wizard of Oz that have any tangible power happen to be females. This includes Dorothy, as well as the four witches. The men, they argue, have some type of character flaw, or lack an essential trait, such as a heart, courage or brains. Advocates point out that Baum was a champion of women’s rights, citing his columns in his Aberdeen newspaper to support this view. Baum also served as the first secretary of the Aberdeen Equal Suffrage Association. Moreover, both his wife and mother-in-law had a profound influence on his views concerning women’s rights.

== Bibliography ==
- Barrett, Laura (March 22, 2006). "From Wonderland to Wasteland: The Wonderful Wizard of Oz, The Great Gatsby, and the New American Fairy Tale". Papers on Language and Literature. Southern Illinois University Edwardsville. Archived from the original on March 3, 2008.
- Baum, L. Frank. The Wonderful Wizard of Oz (1900), online edition with black and white illustrations; online version from Gutenberg, without illustrations; online version with color illustrations
- Blythe, Martin (2006). "Oz is China: A Political Fable of Chinese Dragons and White Tigers". Sexual Fables.
- Bernstein, Robin (2011). Racial Innocence: Performing American Childhood from Slavery to Civil Rights. New York University Press. ISBN 978-0-8147-8708-3.
- Clanton, Gene (1991). Populism: The Humane Preference in America, 1890–1900. Twayne Pub. ISBN 0-8057-9744-0.
- Culver, Stuart (1992). "Growing Up in Oz". American Literary History. 4 (4): 607–628. doi:10.1093/alh/4.4.607. JSTOR 489788.
- Dighe, Ranjit. (2002). The Historian’s Wizard of Oz: Reading L. Frank Baum’s Classic as a Political and Monetary Allegory (Westport, Conn.: Praeger) online.
- Erisman, Fred L. (1968). "L. Frank Baum and the Progressive Dilemma". American Quarterly. 20 (3): 616–623. doi:10.2307/2711021. JSTOR 2711021.
- Gessel, Michael; Koupal, Nancy Tystad; Erisman, Fred (2001). "The Politics of Oz: a Symposium". South Dakota History. 31 (2): 146–168. ISSN 0361-8676.
- Gilead, Sarah (March 1991). "Magic Abjured: Closure in Children's Fantasy Fiction". PMLA. 106 (2): 277–293. doi:10.2307/462663. JSTOR 462663. S2CID 163195775.
- Griswold, Jerry (1987). "There's No Place But Home: The Wizard of Oz". The Antioch Review. 45 (4): 462–475. doi:10.2307/4611799. JSTOR 4611799.
- Jahangir, Rumeana (2009-03-17). "Secrets of the Wizard of Oz". BBC News Magazine.
- Jensen, Richard (1971). The Winning of the Midwest: Social and Political Conflict, 1888–1896. Chicago: University of Chicago Press. ISBN 0-226-39825-0. chapter 10
- Karp, Andrew (1998). "Utopian Tension in L. Frank Baum's Oz". Utopian Studies – via Questia.
- Kim, Helen M. (1996). "Strategic Credulity: Oz as Mass Cultural Parable". Cultural Critique (33): 213–233. doi:10.2307/1354392. JSTOR 1354392.
- Leach, William. Land of Desire: Merchants, Power, and the Rise of a New American Culture (1993), pp. 248–260. excerpt and text search
- Leach, William. "The Clown from Syracuse: The Life and Times of L. Frank Baum. " introduction to Leach, ed. The Wonderful Wizard of Oz 1991. pp. 1–34.
- Maceda, María Teresa Gibert. "Margaret Atwood’s Visions and Revisions of 'The Wizard of Oz'." Journal of English Studies 17 (2019): 175–195.
- Nesbet, Anne (2001). "In Borrowed Balloons: The Wizard of Oz and the History of Soviet Aviation". The Slavic and East European Journal. 45 (1). American Association of Teachers of Slavic and East European Languages: 80–95. doi:10.2307/3086411. JSTOR 3086411.
- Riley, Michael O. (1997). Oz and Beyond: The Fantasy World of L. Frank Baum. University of Kansas Press. ISBN 0-7006-0832-X.
- Ritter, Gretchen (1999). Goldbugs and Greenbacks: The Anti-Monopoly Tradition and the Politics of Finance in America. Cambridge University Press. ISBN 0-521-65392-4.
- Rockoff, Hugh (August 1990). "The 'Wizard of Oz' as a Monetary Allegory" (PDF). Journal of Political Economy. 98 (4): 739–760. doi:10.1086/261704. JSTOR 2937766. S2CID 153606670. Archived from the original (PDF) on 2011-11-19.
- Taylor, Quentin P. "Money and politics in the land of Oz" The Independent Review (Winter 2004/05) online, detailed analysis of why it is a parable by a professor of history and political science at Rogers State University,.
- Velde, Francois R. (2002). "Following the Yellow Brick Road: How the United States Adopted the Gold Standard" (PDF). Economic Perspectives. 26 (2). doi:10.2139/ssrn.377760. S2CID 153212796. SSRN 377760.
- Ziaukas, Tim (1998). "100 Years of Oz: Baum's 'Wizard of Oz' as Gilded Age Public Relations". Public Relations Quarterly.
