= Ocala Demands =

19th-century political platform in US

The Ocala Demands was a platform for economic and political reform that was later adopted by the People's Party. In December, 1890, the National Farmers' Alliance and Industrial Union, more commonly known as the Southern Farmers' Alliance, its affiliate the Colored Farmers' Alliance, and the Farmers' Mutual Benefit Association met jointly in the Marion Opera House in Ocala, Florida, where they adopted the Ocala Demands.

== Context in the Farmers' Movement ==
The Ocala convention was part of a trend in the Farmers' movement of moving from its fraternal and mutual benefit roots towards an increasingly political and radical position. Earlier in the year the Farmers' Alliance had successfully backed a number of candidates for state and Federal office, and the convention delegates hoped that future political gains would lead to major economic and political reforms.

=== Background in Florida ===
==== The Grange, and other activities prior to the Farmer's Alliance ====
The Florida Grange established over 100 local lodges by the late 1870s and launched several cooperative efforts, including the Florida Cooperative Stock Company. The local lodges eventually agreed to form a state-level lodge meeting in Monticello, Florida with B. F. Wardlaw serving as the State Master. The Florida Agriculturist was established by The Grange. A variety of campaigns by the Grange occurred with some being successful. One successful campaign started in 1874 against those who were stealing produce and livestock eventually resulted in the Florida legislature prohibiting the sale of cotton from sunset to sunrise. An ambitious campaign launched in 1875 established a cooperative, the Florida Cooperative Stock Company, but it was not successful. The Grange started to decline in the late 1870s, as it did elsewhere in the United States, and the Grange had left Florida by 1880.

A predecessor to the Populist Party was the Independent movement in 1884. This came as a result of several factors. The first was that African Americans in eastern Florida had grown less fond of the Republican Party which most of them were part of because they had been voting for the party for many years but not getting anything out of it. However, African Americans did not want to vote for the Democratic party because it would not let them hold office. A second reason behind its formation was that a small number of white voters who were members of the Republican Party were not happy with the party but didn't want to vote for the Democrats and saw the Independents as a solution. The Independents ended up having a meeting on June 18 in Live Oak. A slate of candidates was selected along with a platform. In the platform it supported improvements to education, creation of a railroad commission, a free ballot, and local option laws. It denounced the Bourbon Democrats (whom they thought were favoring the railroads) along with the Disston Land Sale. After the 1884 elections, the movement faded away but the grievances of many farmers remained.

Another agricultural group that existed prior to the Farmer's Alliance would be a group of localized farmer's unions in northern Florida counties that started forming in March 1887. It would eventually end up becoming a state union during a meeting held in Gainesville on October 11. During the convention there would be 1,700 members of 35 clubs would end up coming.

==== Farmers Alliance ====
Charles Macune, who had founded the National Farmer's Alliance, sent organizers for the Alliance to several states, including Florida, in the spring of 1887. Two organizers arrived in Florida in June and began organizing in Marianna and Citrus County. The Florida Farmer's Alliance was formed in Marianna on October 4 by 65 sub-Alliances which in total had a membership of 2,000. Oswald Wilson, one of the organizers, became its president. The Alliance grew rapidly, reaching 91 chapters in November. It absorbed the farmer's union in January 1888 with 1,700 members. By 1890 it had sub-alliances in all counties except Franklin, Lee, Dade and Monroe counties. Despite attempts to stay apolitical, the alliance become more political as time went on.

== Content ==
The "Demands" adopted by the Ocala convention called for the abolition of national banks; the establishment of sub-treasuries or depositories in every state, which would make low interest direct loans to farmers and property owners; the increase of money in circulation to not less than $50 per capita; the abolishment of futures of all agricultural and mechanical productions; the introduction of free silver; the prohibition of alien ownership of land, the reclamation of all lands held by railroads and other corporations in excess of what was actually used and needed by them, held for actual settlers only; legislation to ensure that one industry would not be built up at the expense of another; removal of the tariff tax on necessities of life; a graduated income tax; the limitation of all national and state revenues to the necessary expenses of the government economically and honestly administered; strict regulation or ownership of the means of public communication and transportation; and an amendment of the United States Constitution providing for the direct election of United States senators.

Originally the convention was going to be held in Jacksonville before the directors of the Florida Farmers' Alliance had learned that Ocala would have more financial incentive. The Florida Alliance was hoping that the convention would be able to be used as a way to persuade people to join their cause.

There would also be the added component of an exposition called the "Semi-Tropical Exposition" that was held to display Florida positively. This exposition was divided into four sections depicting cultural and agricultural products from the western, central and southern parts of Florida along with a department catering to women as well.

== Result ==
In 1892 the Farmers' Alliance founded the People's (or Populist) Party, and the Ocala Demands were incorporated in the party's Omaha Platform. As the focus of the Farmers' Movement shifted into politics, the Farmer's Alliance faded away. Most of the Populist Party's platform would end up reflecting what was stated in the Ocala Demands.

Although the Alliance did manage to merge along northern and southern lines, this did lead to the exclusion of African-Americans who were part of so called "Colored Alliances". Many white supremacists would end up abandoning the movement along with those who were economically conservative as well after the convention.

== Demands ==
1: We demand the abolition of national banks.

2: We demand that the government shall establish sub-treasuries or depositories in the several states, which shall loan money direct to the people at a low rate of interest, not to exceed two per cent per annum, on non-perishable farm products, and also upon real estate, with proper limitations upon the quantity of land and amount of money.

3: We demand that the amount of the circulating medium be speedily increased to not less than $50 per capita.

4: We demand that Congress shall pass such laws as will effectually prevent the dealing in futures of all agricultural and mechanical productions; providing a stringent system of procedure in trials that will secure the prompt conviction, and imposing such penalties as shall secure the most perfect compliance with the law.

5: We condemn the silver bill recently passed by Congress, and demand in lieu thereof the free and unlimited coinage of silver.

6: We demand the passage of laws prohibiting alien ownership of land, and that Congress take prompt action to devise some plan to obtain all lands now owned by aliens and foreign syndicates; and that all lands now held by railroads and other corporations in excess of such as is actually used and needed by them be reclaimed by the government and held for actual settlers only.

7: Believing in the doctrine of equal rights to all and special privileges to none, we demand—

a: That our national legislation shall be so framed in the future as not to build up one industry at the expense of another.

b: We further demand a removal of the existing heavy tariff tax from the necessities of life that the poor of our land must have.

c: We further demand a just and equitable system of graduated tax on incomes.

d: We believe that the money of the country should be kept as much as possible in the hands of the people, and hence we demand that all national and state revenues shall be limited to the necessary expenses of the government economically and honestly administered.

e: We demand the most rigid, honest and just state and national government control and supervision of the means of public communication and transportation, and if this control and supervision does not remove the abuse now existing, we demand the government ownership of such means of communication and transportation.

f: We demand that the Congress of the United States submit an amendment to the Constitution providing for the election of United States senators by direct vote of the people of each state.

== Sources ==
- Proctor, Samuel (January 1950). "The National Farmers' Alliance Convention of 1890 and its "Ocala Demands"". The Florida Historical Quarterly. 28 (3): 161–181. JSTOR 30140577.
- "Farmer's Alliance". Handbook of Texas Online. Texas State Historical Association. 2010-06-12. Archived from the original on September 12, 2010.
- The Rise and Fall of Populism in the South - URL retrieved June 19, 2006
- Stephen Cresswell. "The People's Party". Cresswell's List. Archived from the original on March 25, 2009.
