= American farm discontent =

The latter part of the 19th century was a period of agrarian unrest in the Midwestern United States. From 1865 to 1896, farmer protests led to the formation of organized movements including the Grange, the Populist Party, the Greenbacks, and other alliances. Farmers cited the reasons for their unhappiness as declining prices, decreasing purchasing power, and monopolistic practices of: 1) moneylenders, 2) railroad corporations, and 3) other middlemen. Recent research has led scholars to question the validity of these explanations. Currently there is no scholarly consensus on the causes of agrarian discontent.

== Uncertainty ==
A factor that contributed to the price volatility of farm products was related to supply-demand. Farm output increased as more people settled in the west. Part of this settlement can be attributed to: the influx of immigrants, the Homestead Act, and railroad construction. Productivity also increased with the advent of advances in agricultural machinery. Many prices for products such as cotton, wheat, and corn, fluctuated significantly as productivity increased. Some scholars point to price volatility during this period as a major cause of farmer discontent. There is evidence linking price volatility to protest within states. A major reason for price volatility was globalization; the development of other countries (Australia, Argentina, South Africa, Ukraine, Russia, and India) entering the market as major suppliers of agricultural products. If the United States were to have a bumper harvest, while Argentina or Eastern Europe had a poor harvest, then the commodity prices and incomes in the United States would rise. Similarly, if the United States had a poor year but Argentina had a good harvest, then the prices and incomes would fall in the United States.

Transportation was the main concern for farmers during this time. The commercialization of agriculture was facilitated by railroad transportation. Farmers complained of the high freight rates, but the available evidence contradicts the rationale. Yet real transport costs fell steadily throughout the post bellum era, but there is some evidence that the farmers were not benefitting from the lower rates. Farmers in the west were shipping their produce farther distances to market than those farmers in the east, additionally, the ton-mile rates were often much higher west of Chicago than the rates from Chicago to New York City. The data indicate that mean prices and mean incomes per acre were linked to the distance from New York City. Farmers in high protest states faced high price variability due to the pattern of prices that was influenced by the railroad network that linked the states. Although, there is evidence that the drop in transportation costs caused farmers with suitable soils to diversify their crops in order to take advantage of relative farm gate prices.

This volatility in prices was compounded by a post bellum shift into monocultures. Farmers that once relied on diversified farming found it profitable to produce only one crop for market sale. This was especially apparent in the South as farmers shifted away from diversified corn and cotton portfolios into solely cotton.

== Commercialization ==
Commercialization was a main component behind agrarian unrest. During this time, farmers engaged in the market production as the relative profitability increased. The purchase of agricultural inputs and goods that were formerly home-produced was acquired with credit. Farmers had to sell their produce at market and subsequently were enveloped in the commercial market system. Thus, the farmer was forced into paying for transportation and credit in order to sell his produce at a high enough price so that he could pay for his inputs. The farmer also now had to judge himself by success of being a businessman and not just a farmer. It has also been noted that the farmers were upset at their depreciating status in society. While they were once a majority voice in the United States, they were now a minority due to the continued industrialization and urbanization of the nation.

== Social movements ==
The unrest enabled many movements to appear on the political scene. The largest were the Grange, Greenback, and Populist movements. The Grange movement, which was organized in 1867, focused primarily on regulating railroads, grain elevators, and other middlemen and monopolies that they thought were taking advantage of the farmer. The most active states for the Grange movement were Illinois, Iowa, Minnesota and Wisconsin.

The Greenback movement peaked in the late 1870s; it campaigned for: higher agricultural prices, against the gold standard, and for a general increase in prices. The states with the most Greenback activity, as a form of agrarian unrest, were Illinois, Indiana, Iowa, and Wisconsin. The Populist Party, which was formed in the 1890s, which were most active in Kansas, Nebraska, and the Dakotas, was a short lived party that campaigned on the regulation of businesses, transportation charges, and monetary issues.

== See also ==
- Farmers' movement
- History of agriculture in the United States
