= Populist Party (United States) =

Political party (1892–1909)

People's Party Populist Party
- Abbreviation: Populists
- Leader: James B. Weaver; Thomas E. Watson
- Founded: 1892; 134 years ago
- Dissolved: 1909; 117 years ago
- Merger of: Farmers' Alliance; Greenback Party; Union Labor Party
- Preceded by: Anti-Monopoly Party; Nationalist Clubs; United Labor Party of New York
- Merged into: Democratic Party; Socialist Party of America
- Ideology: Agrarianism; Bimetallism; Cooperativism; Left-wing populism; Radicalism; Progressivism
- Political position: Left-wing

The People's Party, usually known as the Populist Party or simply the Populists, was an agrarian populist political party in the United States in the late 19th century. The Populist Party emerged in the early 1890s as an important force in the Southern and Western United States, but declined rapidly after the 1896 United States presidential election in which most of its natural constituency was absorbed by the Bryan wing of the Democratic Party. A rump faction of the party continued to operate into the first decade of the 20th century, but never matched the popularity of the party in the early 1890s.

The Populist Party's roots lay in the Farmers' Alliance, an agrarian movement that promoted economic action during the Gilded Age, as well as the Greenback Party, an earlier third party that had advocated fiat money. The success of Farmers' Alliance candidates in the 1890 elections, along with the conservatism of both major parties, encouraged Farmers' Alliance leaders to establish a full-fledged third party before the 1892 elections. The Ocala Demands laid out the Populist platform: collective bargaining, federal regulation of railroad rates, an expansionary monetary policy, and a Sub-Treasury Plan that required the establishment of federally controlled warehouses to aid farmers. Other Populist-endorsed measures included bimetallism, a graduated income tax, direct election of Senators, a shorter workweek, and the establishment of a postal savings system. These measures were collectively designed to curb the influence of monopolistic corporate and financial interests and empower small businesses, farmers and laborers.

In the 1892 presidential election, the Populist ticket of James B. Weaver and James G. Field won 8.5% of the popular vote and carried four Western states, becoming the first third party since the end of the American Civil War to win electoral votes. Despite the support of labor organizers such as Eugene V. Debs and Terence V. Powderly, the party largely failed to win the vote of urban laborers in the Midwest and the Northeast. Over the next four years, the party continued to run state and federal candidates, building up powerful organizations in several Southern and Western states. Before the 1896 presidential election, the Populists became increasingly polarized between "fusionists," who wanted to nominate a joint presidential ticket with the Democratic Party, and "mid-roaders," such as Mary Elizabeth Lease, who favored the continuation of the Populists as an independent third party. After the 1896 Democratic National Convention nominated William Jennings Bryan, a prominent bimetallist, the Populists also nominated Bryan but rejected the Democratic vice-presidential nominee in favor of party leader Thomas E. Watson. In the 1896 election, Bryan swept the South and West but lost to Republican William McKinley by a decisive margin.

After the 1896 presidential election, the Populist Party suffered a nationwide collapse. The party nominated presidential candidates in the three presidential elections after 1896, but none came close to matching Weaver's performance in 1892. Former Populists became inactive or joined other parties. Other than Debs and Bryan, few politicians associated with the Populists retained national prominence.

Historians see the Populists as a reaction to the power of corporate interests in the Gilded Age, but they debate the degree to which the Populists were anti-modern and nativist. Scholars also continue to debate the magnitude of influence the Populists exerted on later organizations and movements, such as the progressives of the early 20th century. Most of the Progressives, such as Theodore Roosevelt, Robert La Follette, and Woodrow Wilson, were bitter enemies of the Populists. In American political rhetoric, "populist" was originally associated with the Populist Party and related to left-wing movements, but beginning in the 1950s it began to take on a more generic meaning, describing any anti-establishment movement regardless of its position on the left–right political spectrum.

== Origins ==
=== Third party antecedents ===
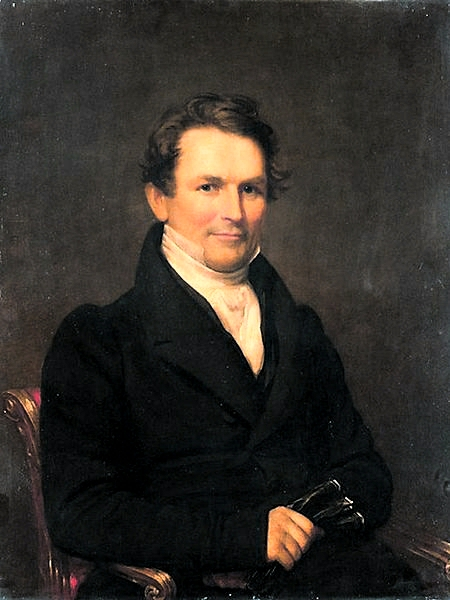
Economist Edward Kellogg was an early advocate of fiat money.

Ideologically, the Populist Party originated in the debate over monetary policy in the aftermath of the American Civil War. In order to fund that war, the U.S. government had left the gold standard by issuing fiat paper currency known as Greenbacks. After the war, the Eastern financial establishment strongly favored a return to the gold standard for both ideological reasons (they believed that money must be backed by gold which, they argued, had intrinsic value) and economic gain (a return to the gold standard would make their government bonds more valuable). Successive presidential administrations favored "hard money" policies that retired the greenbacks, thereby shrinking the amount of currency in circulation. Financial interests also won passage of the Coinage Act of 1873, which barred the coinage of silver, thereby ending a policy of bimetallism. The deflation caused by these policies affected farmers especially strongly, since deflation made it more difficult to pay debts and led to lower prices for agricultural products.

Angered by these developments, some farmers and other groups began calling for the government to permanently adopt fiat currency. These advocates of "soft money" were influenced by economist Edward Kellogg and Alexander Campbell, both of whom advocated for fiat money issued by a central bank. Despite fierce partisan rivalries, the two major parties were both closely allied with business interests and supported largely similar economic policies, including the gold standard. The Democratic Party's 1868 platform endorsed the continued use of greenbacks, but the party embraced hard money policies after the 1868 election.

Though soft money forces were able to win some support in the West, launching a third party proved difficult in the rest of the country. The United States was deeply polarized by the sectional politics of the post-Civil War era; most Northerners remained firmly attached to the Republican Party, while most Southerners identified with the Democratic Party. In the 1870s, advocates of soft money formed the Greenback Party, which called for the continued use of paper money as well as the restoration of bimetallism. Greenback nominee James B. Weaver won over three percent of the vote in the 1880 presidential election, but the Greenback Party was unable to build a durable base of support, and it collapsed in the 1880s. Many former Greenback Party supporters joined the Union Labor Party, but it also failed to win widespread support.

=== Farmers' Alliance ===
Charles W. Macune, one of the leaders of the Farmers' Alliance

A group of farmers formed the Farmers' Alliance in Lampasas, Texas, in 1877, and the organization quickly spread to surrounding counties. The Farmers' Alliance promoted collective economic action by farmers in order to cope with the crop-lien system, which left economic power in the hands of a mercantile elite that furnished goods on credit. The movement became increasingly popular throughout Texas in the mid-1880s, and membership in the organization grew from 10,000 in 1884 to 50,000 at the end of 1885. At the same time, the Farmers' Alliance became increasingly politicized, with members attacking the "money trust" as the source and beneficiary of both the crop lien system and deflation. In the hopes of cementing an alliance with labor groups, the Farmers' Alliance supported the Knights of Labor in the Great Southwest railroad strike of 1886. That same year, a Farmers' Alliance convention issued the Cleburne Demands, a series of resolutions that called for, among other things, collective bargaining, federal regulation of railroad rates, an expansionary monetary policy, and a national banking system administered by the federal government.

President Grover Cleveland's veto of a Texas seed bill in early 1887 outraged many farmers, encouraging the growth of a northern Farmers' Alliance in states like Kansas and Nebraska. That same year, a prolonged drought began in the West, contributing to the bankruptcy of many farmers. In 1887, the Farmers' Alliance merged with the Louisiana Farmers Union and expanded into the South and the Great Plains. In 1889, Charles Macune launched the National Economist, which became the national paper of the Farmers' Alliance.

Macune and other Farmers' Alliance leaders helped organize a December 1889 convention in St. Louis; the convention met with the goal of forming a confederation of the major farm and labor organizations. Though a full merger was not achieved, the Farmers' Alliance and the Knights of Labor jointly endorsed the St. Louis Platform, which included many of the long-standing demands of the Farmers' Alliance. The Platform added a call for Macune's "Sub-Treasury Plan", under which the federal government would establish warehouses in agricultural counties; farmers would be allowed to store their crops in these warehouses and borrow up to 80 percent of the value of their crops. The movement began to expand into the Northeast and the Great Lakes region, while Macune led the establishment of the National Reform Press Association, a network of newspapers sympathetic to the Farmers' Alliance.

== Formation ==
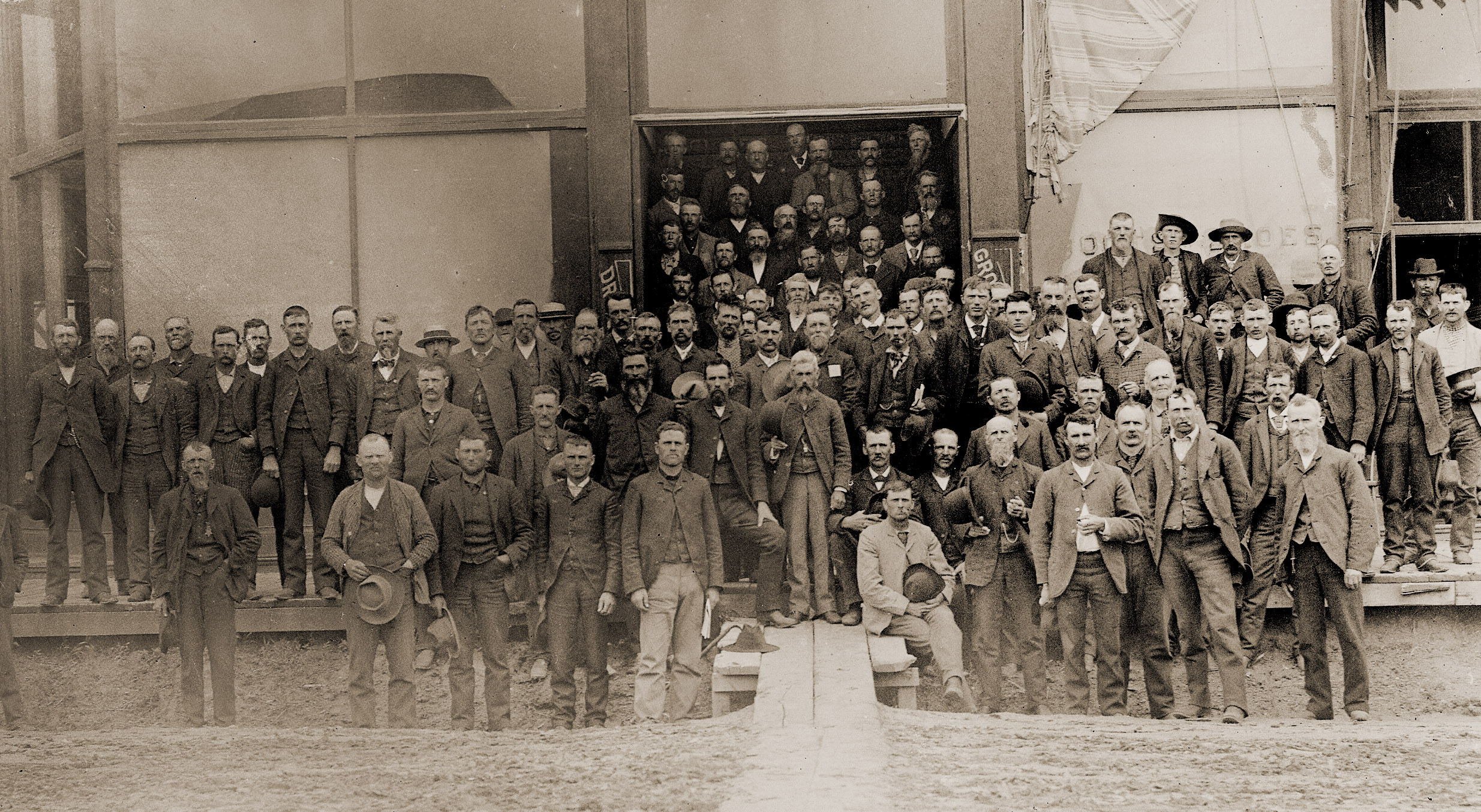
People's Party candidate nominating convention held at Columbus, Nebraska, July 15, 1890

The Farmers' Alliance had initially sought to work within the two-party system, but by 1891 many party leaders had become convinced of the need for a third party that could challenge the conservatism of both major parties. In the 1890 elections, Farmers' Alliance-backed candidates won dozens of races for the U.S. House of Representatives and gained majorities in several state legislatures. Many of these individuals were elected in coalition with Democrats; in Nebraska, the Farmers' Alliance forged an alliance with newly elected Congressman William Jennings Bryan, while in Tennessee, local Farmers' Alliance leader John P. Buchanan was elected governor on the Democratic ticket. As most leading Democrats refused to endorse the Sub-Treasury, many leaders of the Farmers' Alliance remained dissatisfied with both major parties.

In December 1890, a Farmers' Alliance convention re-stated the organization's platform with the Ocala Demands; Farmers' Alliance leaders also agreed to hold another convention in early 1892 to discuss the possibility of establishing a third party if Democrats failed to adopt their policy goals. Among those who favored the establishment of a third party were Farmers' Alliance president Leonidas L. Polk, Georgia newspaper editor Thomas E. Watson, and former Congressman Ignatius L. Donnelly of Minnesota.

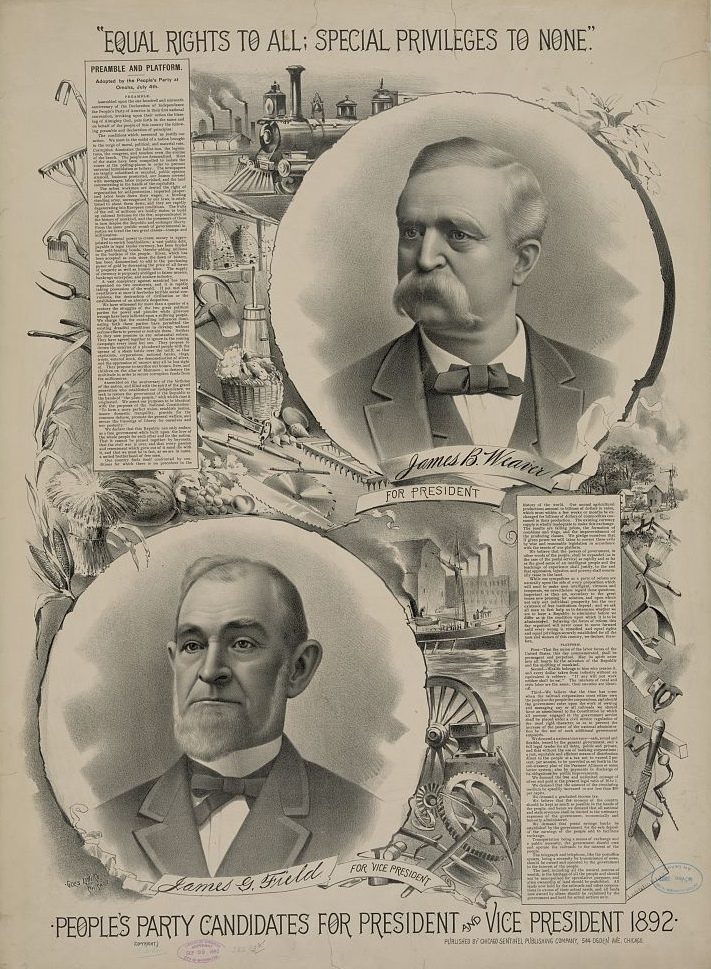
1892 People's Party campaign poster promoting James Weaver for President of the United States

The February 1892 Farmers' Alliance convention was attended by supporters of Edward Bellamy and Henry George, as well as current and former members of the Greenback Party, Prohibition Party, Anti-Monopoly Party, Labor Reform Party, Union Labor Party, United Labor Party, Workingmen Party, and dozens of other minor parties. Delivering the final speech of the convention, Ignatius L. Donnelly, stated, "We meet in the midst of a nation brought to the verge of moral, political, and material ruin. ... We seek to restore the government of the republic to the hands of the 'plain people' with whom it originated. Our doors are open to all points of the compass. ... The interests of rural and urban labor are the same; their enemies are identical." Following Donnelly's speech, delegates agreed to establish the People's Party and hold a presidential nominating convention on July 4 in Omaha, Nebraska. Journalists covering the fledgling party began referring to it as the "Populist Party," and that term quickly became widely popular.

== 1892 election ==
1892 electoral vote results

The initial front-runner for the Populist Party's presidential nomination was Leonidas L. Polk, who had served as the chairman of the party's earlier convention in St. Louis, but he died of an illness weeks before the Populist convention. The party instead turned to former Union General and 1880 Greenback presidential nominee James B. Weaver of Iowa, nominating him on a ticket with former Confederate army officer James G. Field of Virginia. The 1892 Populist National Convention agreed to a party platform known as the Omaha Platform, which proposed the implementation of the Sub-Treasury and other longtime Farmers' Alliance goals. The platform also called for a graduated income tax, direct election of Senators, a shorter workweek, restrictions on immigration to the United States, and public ownership of railroads and communication lines.

The Populists appealed most strongly to voters in the South, the Great Plains, and the Rocky Mountains. In the Rocky Mountains, Populist voters were motivated by support for free silver (bimetallism), opposition to the power of railroads, and clashes with large landowners over water rights. In the South and the Great Plains, Populists had a broad appeal among farmers, but relatively little support in cities and towns. Businessmen and, to a lesser extent, skilled craftsmen were appalled by the perceived radicalism of Populist proposals. Even in rural areas, many voters resisted casting aside their long-standing partisan allegiances. Turner concludes that Populism appealed most strongly to economically distressed farmers who were isolated from urban centers. Linda Slaughter, a prominent women's rights advocate from the Dakota Territory, also participated in the convention, making her the first American woman to vote for a presidential candidate at a national convention.

One of the Populist Party's central goals was to create a coalition between farmers in the South and West and urban laborers in the Midwest and Northeast. In the latter regions, the Populists received the support of union officials like Knights of Labor leader Terrence Powderly and railroad organizer Eugene V. Debs, as well as author Edward Bellamy's Nationalist Clubs. But the Populists lacked compelling campaign planks that appealed specifically to urban laborers, and were largely unable to mobilize support in urban areas. Corporate leaders had largely been successful in preventing labor from organizing politically and economically, and union membership did not rival that of the Farmers' Alliance. Some unions, including the fledgling American Federation of Labor, refused to endorse any political party. Populists were also largely unable to win the support of farmers in the Northeast and the more developed parts of the Midwest.

In the 1892 presidential election, Democratic nominee Grover Cleveland, a strong supporter of the gold standard, defeated incumbent Republican President Benjamin Harrison. Weaver won over one million votes, carried Colorado, Kansas, Idaho, and Nevada, and received electoral votes from Oregon and North Dakota. He was the first third-party candidate since the Civil War to win electoral votes, while Field was the first Southern candidate to win electoral votes since the 1872 election. The Populists performed strongly in the West, but many party leaders were disappointed by the results in parts of the South and the entire Great Lakes Region. Weaver failed to win more than 5% of the vote in any state east of the Mississippi River and north of the Mason–Dixon line.

== Between presidential elections, 1893–1895 ==
Shortly after Cleveland took office, the country fell into a deep recession known as the Panic of 1893. In response, Cleveland and his Democratic allies repealed the Sherman Silver Purchase Act and passed the Wilson–Gorman Tariff Act, which provided for a minor reduction in tariff rates. The Populists denounced the Cleveland administration's continued adherence to the gold standard, and they angrily attacked the administration's decision to purchase gold from a syndicate led by J. P. Morgan. Millions fell into unemployment and poverty, and groups like Coxey's Army organized protest marches in Washington, D.C. Party membership grew in several states; historian Lawrence Goodwyn estimates that in the mid-1890s the party had "a following of anywhere from 25 to 45 percent of the electorate in twenty-odd states." Partly due to the growing popularity of the Populist movement, the Democratic Congress included a provision to re-implement a federal income tax in the 1894 Wilson–Gorman Tariff Act. (Note: The income tax provision was struck down by the Supreme Court in the 1895 case of Pollock v. Farmers' Loan & Trust Co.)

The Populists faced challenges from both the established major parties and the "Silverites", who generally disregarded the Omaha Platform in favor of bimetallism. These Silverites, who formed groups like the Silver Party and the Silver Republican Party, became particularly strong in Western mining states like Nevada and Colorado. In Colorado, Populists elected Davis Hanson Waite as governor, but the party divided over the Waite's refusal to break the Cripple Creek miners' strike of 1894. Silverites were also strong in Nebraska, where Democratic Congressman William Jennings Bryan continued to enjoy the support of many Nebraska Populists. A coalition of Democrats and Populists elected Populist William V. Allen to the Senate.

The 1894 elections were a massive defeat for the Democratic Party throughout the country, and a mixed result for the Populists. Populists performed poorly in the West and Midwest, where Republicans dominated, but won elections in Alabama and other states. In the aftermath, some party leaders, particularly those outside the South, became convinced of the need to fuse with Democrats and adopt bimetallism as the party's key issue. Party chairman Herman Taubeneck declared that the party should abandon the Omaha Platform and "unite the reform forces of the nation" behind bimetallism. Meanwhile, leading Democrats increasingly distanced themselves from Cleveland's gold standard policies in the aftermath of their performance in the 1894 elections.

The Populists became increasingly polarized between moderate "fusionists" like Taubeneck and radical "mid-roaders" (named for their desire to take a middle road between Democrats and Republicans) like Tom Watson. Fusionists believed the perceived radicalism of the Omaha Platform limited the party's appeal, whereas a platform based on free silver would resonate with a wide array of groups. The mid-roaders believed that free silver did not represent serious economic reform, and continued to call for government ownership of railroads, major changes to the financial system, and resistance to the influence of large corporations. One Texas Populist wrote that free silver would "leave undisturbed all the conditions which give rise to the undue concentration of wealth. The so-called silver party may prove a veritable Trojan Horse if we are not careful." In an attempt to get the party to repudiate the Omaha Platform in favor of free silver, Taubeneck called a party convention in December 1894. Rather than repudiating the Omaha Platform, the convention expanded it to include a call for the municipal ownership of public utilities. After 1894, the groundswell of interest in monetary reform could not be ignored.

=== Populist-Republican fusion in North Carolina ===
In 1894–1896, the Populist wave of agrarian unrest swept through the cotton and tobacco regions of the South. The most dramatic impact was in North Carolina, where the poor white farmers who comprised the Populist party formed a working coalition with the Republican Party, then largely controlled by blacks in the low country, and poor whites in the mountain districts. They took control of the state legislature in both 1894 and 1896, and the governorship in 1896. Restrictive rules on voting were repealed. In 1895 the legislature rewarded its black allies with patronage, naming 300 black magistrates in eastern districts, as well as deputy sheriffs and city policemen. They also received some federal patronage from the coalition congressman, and state patronage from the governor.

=== Women and African Americans ===
Due to the prevailing racist attitudes of the late 19th century, any political alliance of Southern blacks and Southern whites was difficult to construct; however, shared economic concerns allowed some transracial coalition building. After 1886, black farmers started organizing local agricultural groups along the lines the Farmers' Alliance advocated, and in 1888 the national Colored Alliance was established.

Some southern Populists, including Watson, openly spoke of the need for poor blacks and poor whites to set aside their racial differences in the name of shared economic interests. The Omaha Platform, appealed 'to reason and not to prejudice'. The motto of the Alliance was: 'Equal rights to all and special privileges to none'. Tom Watson, one of the key founders of the People's Party in the state of Georgia in early 1892, was the first white Southern leader to acknowledge black farmers' aspirations, appealing for justice. He believed that blacks and whites had been conditioned to hate each other, assuming that upon that hatred the keystone of the arch of financial exploitation is rested. Moreover, the Populists followed the Prohibition Party in actively including women in their affairs. But regardless of these appeals, racism did not evade the People's Party. Prominent Populist Party leaders such as Marion Butler at least partially demonstrated a dedication to the cause of white supremacy, and there appears to have been some support for this viewpoint in the party's rank-and-file membership. By around 1900, Watson himself became an outspoken white supremacist.

=== Conspiratorial tendencies ===
Historians continue to debate the degree to which the Populists were bigoted against foreigners and Jews. Members of the anti-Catholic American Protective Association were influential in California's Populist Party organization, and some Populists embraced the anti-Semitic conspiracy theory that the Rothschild family sought to control the United States. Historian Hasia Diner says:

Some Populists believed that Jews made up a class of international financiers whose policies had ruined small family farms, they asserted, owned the banks and promoted the gold standard, the chief sources of their impoverishment. Agrarian radicalism posited the city as antithetical to American values, asserting that Jews were the essence of urban corruption.

== Presidential election of 1896 ==
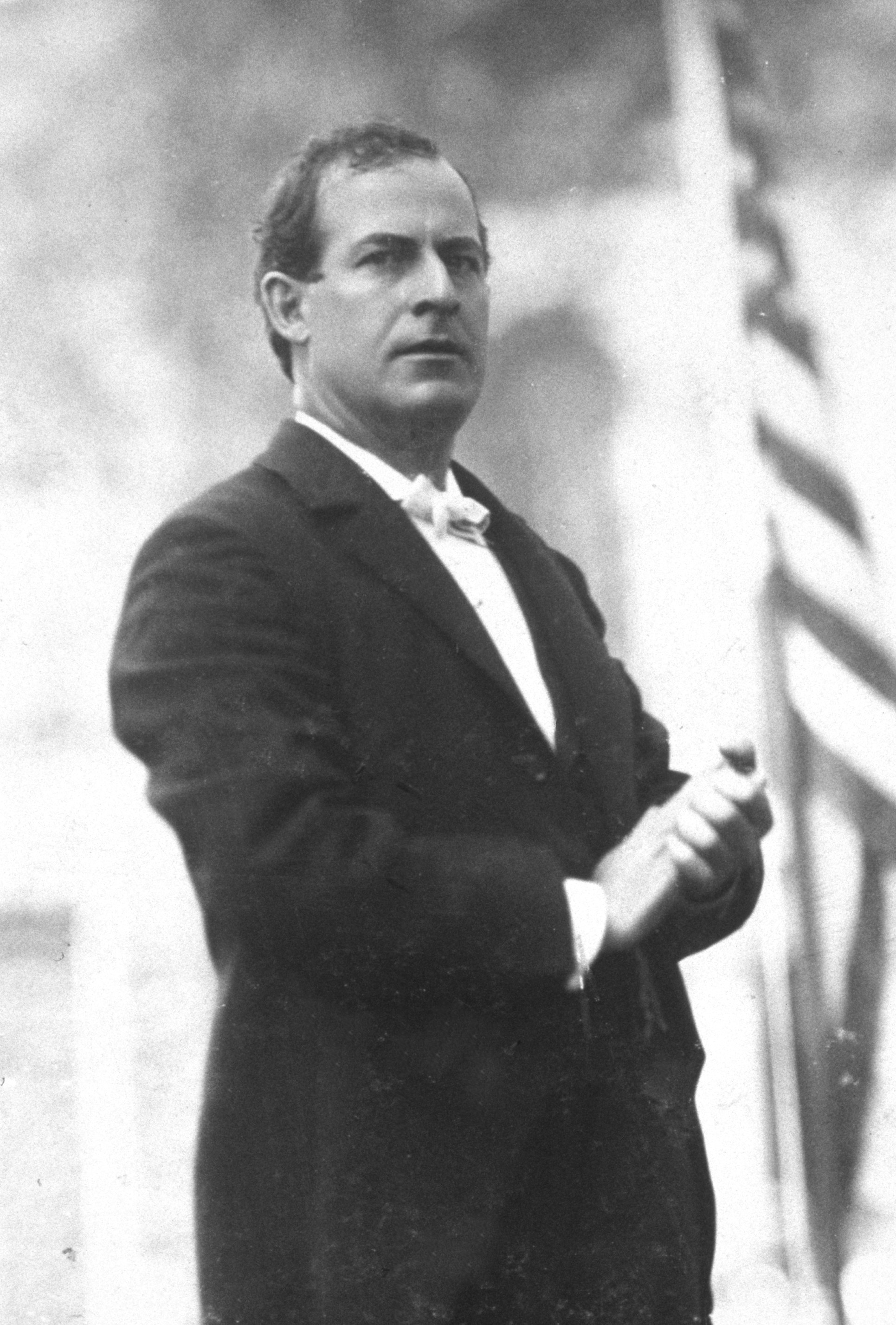
In 1896, the 36-year-old William Jennings Bryan was the chosen candidate resulting from the fusion of the Democrats and the People's Party.

In the lead-up to the 1896 presidential election, mid-roaders, fusionists, and free silver Democrats all maneuvered to put their favored candidates in the best position to win. Mid-roaders sought to ensure that the Populists would hold their national convention before that of the Democratic Party, thereby ensuring that they could not be accused of dividing "reform" forces. Defying those hopes, Taubeneck arranged for the 1896 Populist National Convention to take place one week after the 1896 Democratic National Convention. Mid-roaders mobilized to defeat the fusionists; the Southern Mercury urged readers to nominate convention delegates who would "support the Omaha Platform in its entirety." As most of the party's high-ranking officeholders were fusionists, the mid-roaders faced difficulty in uniting around a candidate.

The 1896 Republican National Convention nominated William McKinley, a long-time Republican leader who was best known for leading the passage of 1890 McKinley Tariff. McKinley initially sought to downplay the gold standard in favor of campaigning on higher tariff rates, but he agreed to fully endorse the gold standard at the insistence of Republican donors and party leaders. Meeting later in the year, the 1896 Democratic National Convention nominated William Jennings Bryan for president after Bryan's Cross of Gold speech galvanized the party behind free silver. For vice president, the party nominated conservative shipping magnate Arthur Sewall.

When the Populist convention met, fusionists proposed that the Populists nominate the Democratic ticket, while mid-roaders organized to defeat fusionist efforts. As Sewall was objectionable to many within the party, the mid-roaders successfully moved a motion to nominate the vice president first. Despite a telegram from Bryan indicating that he would not accept the Populist nomination if the party did not also nominate Sewall, the convention chose Tom Watson as the party's vice presidential nominee. The convention also reaffirmed the major planks of the 1892 platform and added support for initiatives and referendums. When the convention's presidential ballot began, it was still unclear whether Bryan would be nominated for president and whether Bryan would accept the nomination if offered. Mid-roaders put forward their own candidate, obscure newspaper editor S. F. Norton, but Norton was unable to win the support of many delegates. After a long and contentious series of roll call votes, Bryan won the Populist presidential nomination, taking 1042 votes to Norton's 321 votes.

Despite his earlier proclamation, Bryan accepted the Populist nomination. Facing a massive financial and organizational disadvantage, Bryan embarked on a campaign that took him across the country. He largely ignored major cities and the Northeast, instead focusing on the Midwest, which he hoped to win in conjunction with the Great Plains, the Far West, and the South. Watson, ostensibly Bryan's running mate, campaigned on a platform of "Straight Populism" and frequently attacked Sewall as an agent for "the banks and railroads." He delivered several speeches in Texas and the Midwest before returning to his home in Georgia for the remainder of the election.

Ultimately, McKinley won a decisive majority of the electoral vote and became the first presidential candidate to win with a majority of the popular vote since the 1872 presidential election. Bryan swept the old Populist strongholds in the West and South, and added the silverite states in the West, but did poorly in the industrial heartland. His strength was largely based on the traditional Democratic vote, but he lost many German Catholics and members of the middle class. Historians believe his defeat was partly attributable to the tactics Bryan used; he had aggressively "run" for president, while traditional candidates would use "front porch campaigns." The united opposition of nearly all business leaders and most religious leaders also hurt his candidacy, as did his poor showing among Catholic groups who were alienated by Bryan's emphasis on Protestant moral values.

== Collapse ==
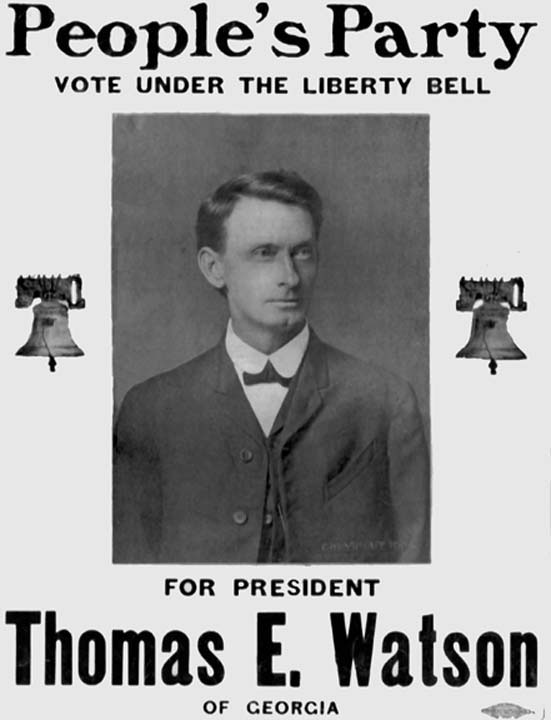
People's Party campaign poster from 1904 touting the candidacy of Thomas E. Watson

The Populist movement never recovered from the failure of 1896, and national fusion with the Democrats proved disastrous to the party. In the Midwest, the Populist Party essentially merged into the Democratic Party before the end of the 1890s. In the South, the National Alliance with the Democrats sapped the Populists' ability to remain independent. Tennessee's Populist Party was demoralized by a diminishing membership, and puzzled and split by the dilemma of whether to fight the state-level enemy (the Democrats) or the national foe (the Republicans and Wall Street). By 1900 the People's Party of Tennessee was a shadow of what it once was. A similar pattern repeated throughout the South, where the Populist Party had previously sought alliances with the Republican Party against the dominant state Democrats, including in Watson's Georgia.

In North Carolina, the state Democratic Party orchestrated a propaganda campaign in newspapers across the state, and created a brutal and violent white supremacy election campaign to defeat the North Carolina Populists and GOP, the Fusionist revolt in North Carolina collapsed in 1898, and white Democrats returned to power. The gravity of the crisis was underscored by the Wilmington massacre in 1898, two days after the election. Knowing they had just retaken control of the state legislature, the Democrats were confident they could not be overcome. They attacked and overcame the Fusionists; mobs roamed the black neighborhoods, shooting, killing, burning buildings, and making a special target of the black newspaper. There were no further insurgencies in any Southern states involving a successful black coalition at the state level. By 1900, the gains of the populist-Republican coalition were reversed, and the Democrats ushered in disfranchisement: practically all blacks lost their vote, and the Populist-Republican alliance fell apart.

In 1900, many Populist voters supported Bryan again (though Marion Butler's home county of Sampson swung heavily to Republican McKinley in a backlash against the state Democratic party), but the weakened party nominated a separate ticket of Wharton Barker and Ignatius L. Donnelly, and disbanded afterward. The prosperity of the first decade of the 1900s helped ensure that the party continued to fade away. Populist activists retired from politics, joined a major party, or followed Debs into the Socialist Party.

In 1904, the party was reorganized, and Watson was its nominee for president in 1904 and 1908, after which the party disbanded again.

In A Preface to Politics, published in 1913, Walter Lippmann wrote, "As I write, a convention of the Populist Party has just taken place. Eight delegates attended the meeting, which was held in a parlor."

== Legacy ==
According to Gene Clanton's study of Kansas, populism and progressivism had a few similarities but different bases of support. Both opposed trusts. Populism emerged earlier and came out of the farm community. It was radically egalitarian in favor. It was weak in the towns and cities except in labor unions. Progressivism, on the other hand, was a later movement. It emerged after the 1890s from the urban business and professional communities. Most of its activists had opposed populism. It was elitist, and emphasized education and expertise. Its goals were to enhance efficiency, reduce waste, and enlarge the opportunities for upward social mobility. However, some former Populists changed their emphasis after 1900 and supported progressive reforms.

=== Debate by historians ===
Since the 1890s, historians have vigorously debated the nature of Populism. Some historians see the populists as forward-looking liberal reformers, others as reactionaries trying to recapture an idyllic and utopian past. For some, they were radicals out to restructure American life, and for others, they were economically hard-pressed agrarians seeking government relief. Much recent scholarship emphasizes Populism's debt to early American republicanism. Clanton (1991) stresses that Populism was "the last significant expression of an old radical tradition that derived from Enlightenment sources that had been filtered through a political tradition that bore the distinct imprint of Jeffersonian, Jacksonian, and Lincolnian democracy." This tradition emphasized human rights over the cash nexus of the Gilded Age's dominant ideology.

Frederick Jackson Turner and a succession of western historians depicted the Populists as responding to the closure of the frontier. Turner wrote:

The Farmers' Alliance and the Populist demand for government ownership of the railroad is a phase of the same effort of the pioneer farmer, on his latest frontier. The proposals have taken increasing proportions in each region of Western Advance. Taken as a whole, Populism is a manifestation of the old pioneer ideals of the native American, with the added element of increasing readiness to utilize the national government to effect its ends.

The most influential scholar of Populism was John Donald Hicks, who emphasized economic pragmatism over ideals, presenting Populism as interest group politics, with have-nots demanding their fair share of America's wealth which was being leeched off by nonproductive speculators. Hicks gave attention to the massive drought that ruined so many Kansas farmers in the 1880s, but also pointed to greed, financial manipulations, deflation in prices caused by the gold standard, high interest rates, mortgage foreclosures, and high railroad rates. Corruption accounted for such outrages and Populists presented popular control of government as the solution, a point that later students of republicanism emphasized. In the 1930s, C. Vann Woodward stressed the southern base, seeing the possibility of a black-and-white coalition of poor against the overbearing rich.

In the 1950s, scholars such as Richard Hofstadter portrayed the Populist movement as an irrational response of backward-looking farmers to the challenges of modernity. Though Hofstadter wrote that the Populists were the "first modern political movement of practical importance in the United States to insist that the federal government had some responsibility for the common weal", he criticized the movement as anti-Semitic, conspiracy-minded, nativist, and grievance-based. According to Hofstadter, the antithesis of anti-modern Populism was the modernizing nature of Progressivism. Hofstadter noted that leading progressives like Theodore Roosevelt, Robert La Follette Sr., George Norris and Woodrow Wilson were vehement enemies of Populism, though Bryan cooperated with them and accepted the Populist nomination in 1896. Reichley (1992) sees the Populist Party primarily as a reaction to the decline of the political hegemony of white Protestant farmers; the share of farmers in the workforce had fallen from about 70% in the early 1830s to about 33% in the 1890s. Reichley argues that, while the Populist Party was founded in reaction to economic hardship, by the mid-1890s it was "reacting not simply against the money power but against the whole world of cities and alien customs and loose living they felt was challenging the agrarian way of life."

Lawrence Goodwyn (1976) and Charles Postel (2007) reject the notion that the Populists were traditionalistic and anti-modern. Rather, they argue, the Populists aggressively sought self-consciously progressive goals. Goodwyn criticizes Hofstadter's reliance on secondary sources to characterize the Populists, working instead with material generated by the Populists themselves. Goodwyn construes Populism as a cultural concept, a radical agrarian "insurgent movement" that championed democratic politics against the exploitative commercial capitalism of the elites. Goodwyn determines that the farmers' cooperatives gave rise to a Populist culture, and their efforts to free farmers from lien merchants revealed to them the political structure of the economy, which propelled them into politics. Goodwyn asserts that the Populist movement overcame astounding odds and brought many non-elites to "participate in significant democratic politics" for the first time. Goodwyn notes that the radically democratic promise of the Populists largely went unfulfilled. As such, Populism represents a "saga of democratic striving," albeit one fated to failure because it was arrayed against the forces of economic modernity.

In contrast to Goodwyn, Postel instead emphasizes the strikingly modernizing impulses of the Populists. The Populists sought diffusion of scientific and technical knowledge, formed highly centralized organizations, launched large-scale incorporated businesses, and pressed for an array of state-centered reforms. Hundreds of thousands of women committed to Populism, seeking a more modern life, education, and employment in schools and offices. A large section of the labor movement looked to Populism for answers, forging a political coalition with farmers that gave impetus to the regulatory state. Progress, however, was also menacing and inhumane, Postel notes. White Populists embraced Social Darwinist notions of racial improvement, Chinese exclusion and separate-but-equal. Postel characterizes Populism as a broad social movement containing "diverse and contradictory elements," leaving an especially mixed legacy in American racial politics.

In The True and Only Heaven: Progress and its Critics (1991), Christopher Lasch interpreted the Populists as radical democrats with moral conservative values such as respect for limits, locality, worksmanship, thrift and community, who believed that economic development should remain subordinate to human-scale institutions and democratic self-government.

=== Influence on later movements ===
Populist voters remained active in the electorate long after 1896, but historians continue to debate which party, if any, absorbed the largest share of them. In a case study of California Populists, historian Michael Magliari found that Populist voters influenced reform movements in California's Democratic Party and Socialist Party, but had a smaller impact on California's Republican Party. In 1990, historian William F. Holmes wrote, "an earlier generation of historians viewed Populism as the initiator of twentieth-century liberalism as manifested in Progressivism, but over the past two decades we have learned that fundamental differences separated the two movements." Most of the leading progressives (except Bryan) fiercely opposed Populism. Theodore Roosevelt, Norris, La Follette, William Allen White and Wilson all strongly opposed Populism.

It is debated whether any Populist ideas made their way into the Democratic Party during the New Deal era. The New Deal farm programs were designed by experts (like Henry A. Wallace) who had nothing to do with Populism; the demand for such programs themselves, however, had been a populist demand. Michael Kazin's The Populist Persuasion (1995) argues that Populism reflected a rhetorical style that manifested itself in spokesmen like Father Charles Coughlin in the 1930s and Governor George Wallace in the 1960s. In Where Did the Party Go? William Jennings Bryan, Hubert Humphrey, and the Jeffersonian Legacy (2006) and Politics on a Human Scale: The American Tradition of Decentralism (2013), Jeff Taylor argues that William Jennings Bryan's liberalism was different from the New Deal liberalism of Franklin D. Roosevelt, Harry S. Truman, John F. Kennedy and Lyndon B. Johnson.

Thomas Frank points out the continuity between Populism and socialism in the USA, as many populists went on to become socialists and members of the Socialist Party of America, including Eugene Debs, a lot of the populist leadership and the newspaper Appeal to Reason. In addition, a "neo-populist" movement persisted in the form of the Nonpartisan League of North Dakota. In general, many of the demands of Populists were eventually realized by later movements, including leaving the gold standard, a secret ballot, women's suffrage, an income tax, an eight-hour workday, and farm programs.

Long after the dissolution of the Populist Party, other third parties, including a People's Party founded in 1971, and a separate People's Party founded in 2017 and a Populist Party founded in 1984, took on similar names. These parties were not directly related to the Populist Party.

=== Populism as a generic term ===
In the United States, the term "populist" originally referred to the Populist Party and related left-wing movements of the late 19th century that wanted to curtail the power of the corporate and financial establishment. Later, the term "populist" began to apply to any anti-establishment movement. The original generic definition of the term, which has held consistently since the emergence of its post-Populist Party genericness, describes a populist as "a believer in the rights, wisdom, or virtues of the common people." In the 21st century, the term once again began to be used. Politicians as diverse as independent left-wing Senator Bernie Sanders of Vermont and Republican President Donald Trump have been labeled populists.

== Electoral history and elected officials ==
=== Presidential tickets ===
Year	Presidential nominee	Home state	Previous positions	Vice presidential nominee	Home state	Previous positions	Votes	Notes
1892	James B. Weaver	Iowa	Member of the U.S. House of Representatives from Iowa's 6th congressional district (1879–1881; 1885–1889); Greenback Party nominee for President of the United States (1880)	James G. Field	Virginia	Attorney General of Virginia (1877–1882)	1,026,595 (8.5%); 22 EV	
1896	William Jennings Bryan	Nebraska	Member of the U.S. House of Representatives from Nebraska's 1st congressional district (1891–1895)	Thomas E. Watson	Georgia	Member of the U.S. House of Representatives from Georgia's 10th congressional district (1891–1893)	222,583 (1.6%); 27 EV	
1900	Wharton Barker	Pennsylvania	Financier, publicist	Ignatius L. Donnelly	Minnesota	Lieutenant Governor of Minnesota (1860–1863); Member of the U.S. House of Representatives from Minnesota's 2nd congressional district (1863–1869); Member of the Minnesota Senate (1875–1879; 1891–1895); Member of the Minnesota House of Representatives (1887–1889; 1897–1899)	50,989 (0.4%); 0 EV	
1904	Thomas E. Watson	Georgia	(see above)	Thomas Tibbles	Nebraska	Journalist	114,070 (0.8%); 0 EV	
1908	Thomas E. Watson	Georgia	(see above)	Samuel Williams	Indiana	Judge	28,862 (0.2%); 0 EV	

=== Seats in Congress ===
Seats in Congress
Election year	House of Representatives		Senate	
Election year	Seats after election	+/–	Seats after election	+/–
1890	8 / 356	New	1 / 88	New
1892	11 / 356	▲3	3 / 88	▲1
1894	9 / 357	▼2	4 / 88	▲1
1896	22 / 357	▲13	5 / 90	▲1
1898	6 / 357	▼16	4 / 90	▼1
1900	5 / 357	▼1	4 / 90	▼1
1902	0 / 357	▼5	0 / 90	▼2

=== Governors ===
- Colorado: Davis Hanson Waite, 1893–1895
- Idaho: Frank Steunenberg, 1897–1901 (fusion of Democrats and Populists)
- Kansas: Lorenzo D. Lewelling, 1893–1895
- Kansas: John W. Leedy, 1897–1899
- Nebraska: Silas A. Holcomb, 1895–1899 (fusion of Democrats and Populists)
- Nebraska: William A. Poynter, 1899–1901 (fusion of Democrats and Populists)
- North Carolina: Daniel Lindsay Russell, 1897–1901 (coalition of Republicans and Populists)
- Oregon: Sylvester Pennoyer, 1887–1895 (fusion of Democrats and Populists)
- Minnesota: John Lind, 1899-1901 (fusion of Democrats and Populists)
- North Dakota: Eli C.D. Shortridge 1893–1895 (fusion of Democrats and Populists)
- South Dakota: Andrew E. Lee, 1897–1901
- Tennessee: John P. Buchanan, 1891–1893 (coalition of Democrats and Populists)
- Washington: John Rogers, 1897–1901 (fusion of Democrats and Populists)
- Montana: Robert Burns Smith, 1897–1901 (fusion of Democrats and Populists)

=== Members of Congress ===
Approximately forty-five members of the party served in the U.S. Congress between 1891 and 1902. These included six United States Senators:

- William A. Peffer and William A. Harris from Kansas
- Marion Butler of North Carolina
- James H. Kyle from South Dakota
- Henry Heitfeld of Idaho
- William V. Allen from Nebraska

The following were Populist members of the U.S. House of Representatives:

52nd United States Congress

- Thomas E. Watson, Georgia's 10th congressional district
- Benjamin Hutchinson Clover, Kansas's 3rd congressional district
- John Grant Otis, Kansas's 4th congressional district
- John Davis, Kansas's 5th congressional district
- William Baker, Kansas's 6th congressional district
- Jerry Simpson, Kansas's 7th congressional district
- Kittel Halvorson, Minnesota's 5th congressional district
- William A. McKeighan, Nebraska's 2nd congressional district
- Omer Madison Kem, Nebraska's 3rd congressional district

53rd United States Congress

- Haldor Boen, Minnesota's 7th congressional district
- Marion Cannon, California's 6th congressional district
- Lafayette Pence, Colorado's 1st congressional district
- John Calhoun Bell, Colorado's 2nd congressional district
- Thomas Jefferson Hudson, Kansas's 3rd congressional district
- John Davis, Kansas' 5th congressional district
- William Baker, Kansas' 6th congressional district
- Jerry Simpson, Kansas' 7th congressional district
- William A. Harris, Kansas Member-at-large
- William A. McKeighan, Nebraska's 5th congressional district
- Omer Madison Kem, Nebraska's 6th congressional district
- Alonzo C. Shuford, North Carolina's 7th congressional district

54th United States Congress

- Albert Taylor Goodwyn, Alabama's 5th congressional district
- Milford W. Howard, Alabama's 7th congressional district
- William Baker, Kansas' 6th congressional district
- Omer Madison Kem, Nebraska's 6th congressional district
- Harry Skinner, North Carolina's 1st congressional district
- William F. Strowd, North Carolina's 4th congressional district
- Charles H. Martin (1848–1931), North Carolina's 6th congressional district
- Alonzo C. Shuford, North Carolina's 7th congressional district

55th United States Congress

- Albert Taylor Goodwyn, Alabama's 5th congressional district
- Charles A. Barlow, California's 6th congressional district
- Curtis H. Castle, California's 7th congressional district
- James Gunn, Idaho's 1st congressional district
- Mason Summers Peters, Kansas's 2nd congressional district
- Edwin Reed Ridgely, Kansas's 3rd congressional district
- William Davis Vincent, Kansas's 5th congressional district
- Nelson B. McCormick, Kansas's 6th congressional district
- Jerry Simpson, Kansas's 7th congressional district
- Jeremiah Dunham Botkin, Kansas Member-at-large
- Samuel Maxwell, Nebraska's 3rd congressional district
- William Ledyard Stark, Nebraska's 4th congressional district
- Roderick Dhu Sutherland, Nebraska's 5th congressional district
- William Laury Greene, Nebraska's 6th congressional district
- Harry Skinner, North Carolina's 1st congressional district
- John E. Fowler, North Carolina's 3rd congressional district
- William F. Strowd, North Carolina's 4th congressional district
- Charles H. Martin, North Carolina's 5th congressional district
- Alonzo C. Shuford, North Carolina's 7th congressional district
- John Edward Kelley, South Dakota's 1st congressional district
- Freeman T. Knowles, South Dakota's 2nd congressional district

56th United States Congress

- William Ledyard Stark, Nebraska's 4th congressional district
- Roderick Dhu Sutherland, Nebraska's 5th congressional district
- William Laury Greene, Nebraska's 6th congressional district
- John W. Atwater, North Carolina's 4th congressional district

57th United States Congress

- Thomas L. Glenn, Idaho's 1st congressional district
- Caldwell Edwards, Montana's 1st congressional district
- William Ledyard Stark, Nebraska's 4th congressional district
- William Neville, Nebraska's 6th congressional district

== See also ==
- Left-wing populism
- List of political parties in the United States
- Political interpretations of The Wonderful Wizard of Oz
- Annie Le Porte Diggs (1853–1916), Populist advocate
- Leonard M. Landsborough, California Populist

== Bibliography ==
=== Secondary sources ===
- Ali, Omar H. (2010). In the Lion's Mouth: Black Populism in the New South, 1886–1900. University Press of Mississippi. ISBN 9781604737806.
- Argersinger, Peter H. (2015) [1982]. Populism and Politics: William Alfred Peffer and the People's Party. University Press of Kentucky. ISBN 9780813162003.
- Beeby, James M. (2008). Revolt of the Tar Heels: The North Carolina Populist Movement, 1890-1901. University Press of Mississippi. ISBN 9781604733242.
- Berman, David R. (2007). Radicalism in the Mountain West, 1890-1920: Socialists, Populists, Miners, and Wobblies. University Press of Colorado. ISBN 9781607320067.
- Brands, H. W. (2010). American Colossus: The Triumph of Capitalism 1865-1900. Doubleday. ISBN 978-0-385-52333-2.
- Clanton, O. Gene (1991). Populism: The Humane Preference in America, 1890-1900. Twayne Publishers. ISBN 9780805797442.
- Durden, Robert F. (2015) [1965]. The Climax of Populism: The Election of 1896. University Press of Kentucky. ISBN 9780813162652.
- Formisano, Ronald P. (2008). For the People: American Populist Movements from the Revolution to the 1850s. University of North Carolina Press. ISBN 9780807831724.
- Goodwyn, Lawrence (1978). The Populist Moment: A Short History of the Agrarian Revolt in America. Oxford University Press. ISBN 9780199736096.
- Hackney, Sheldon, ed. (1971). Populism: the Critical Issues. Little, Brown. ISBN 978-0316336901.
- Hicks, John D. "The Sub-Treasury: A Forgotten Plan for the Relief of Agriculture". Mississippi Valley Historical Review, Vol. 15, No. 3 (Dec., 1928), pp. 355–373. in JSTOR.
- Hicks, John D. The Populist Revolt: A History of the Farmers' Alliance and the People's Party Minneapolis, MN: University of Minnesota Press, 1931.
- Hild, Matthew (2007). Greenbackers, Knights of Labor, and Populists: Farmer-Labor Insurgency in the Late-Nineteenth-Century South. University of Georgia Press. ISBN 9780820328973.
- Hild, Matthew. Arkansas's Gilded Age: The Rise, Decline, and Legacy of Populism and Working-Class Protest (U of Missouri Press, 2018) online review
- Holmes, William F. (1990). "Populism: In Search of Context". Agricultural History. 64 (4): 26–58. JSTOR 3743349.
- Hunt, James L. (2003). Marion Butler and American Populism. University of North Carolina Press. ISBN 9780807862506.
- Jessen, Nathan (2017). Populism and Imperialism: Politics, Culture, and Foreign Policy in the American West, 1890-1900. University Press of Kansas. ISBN 9780700624645.
- Kazin, Michael (1995). The Populist Persuasion. Basic Books. ISBN 978-0465037933.
- Kazin, Michael (2006). A Godly Hero: The Life of William Jennings Bryan. Knopf. ISBN 978-0375411359.
- Knoles, George Harmon. "Populism and Socialism, with Special Reference to the Election of 1892," Pacific Historical Review, vol. 12, no. 3 (Sept. 1943), pp. 295–304. In JSTOR
- Kuzminski, Adrian. Fixing the System: A History of Populism, Ancient & Modern. New York: Continuum Books, 2008.
- Lester, Connie (2006). Up from the Mudsills of Hell: The Farmers' Alliance, Populism, and Progressive Agriculture in Tennessee, 1870–1915. University of Georgia Press. ISBN 978-0820327624.
- Magliari, Michael (1995). "What Happened to the Populist Vote? A California Case Study". Pacific Historical Review. 64 (3): 389–412. doi:10.2307/3641007. JSTOR 3641007.
- McMath, Robert C. Jr. (1993). American Populism: A Social History 1877-1898. Macmillan. ISBN 9780374522643.
- Miller, Worth Robert. "A Centennial Historiography of American Populism." Kansas History 1993 16(1): 54–69. online edition
- Miller, Worth Robert. "Farmers and Third-Party Politics in Late Nineteenth Century America," in Charles W. Calhoun, ed. The Gilded Age: Essays on the Origins of Modern America (1995) online edition
- Nugent, Walter (2013). The Tolerant Populists: Kansas Populism and Nativism (2nd ed.). University of Chicago Press. ISBN 9780226054117.
- Ostler, Jeffrey (1992). "Why the Populist Party Was Strong in Kansas and Nebraska but Weak in Iowa". Western Historical Quarterly. 23 (4): 451–474. doi:10.2307/970302. JSTOR 970302.
- Palmer, Bruce (1980). "Man Over Money": the Southern Populist Critique of American Capitalism. University of North Carolina Press. ISBN 978-0-8078-1427-7.
- Peterson, James. "The Trade Unions and the Populist Party," Science & Society, vol. 8, no. 2 (Spring 1944), pp. 143–160. In JSTOR.
- Pollack, Norman (1976). The Populist Response to Industrial America: Midwestern Populist Thought. Harvard University Press. ISBN 9780674690516.
- Postel, Charles (2007). The Populist Vision. Oxford University Press. ISBN 9780199758463.
- Rogers, William Warren (2001) [1970]. The One-gallused Rebellion: Agrarianism in Alabama, 1865-1896. University of Alabama Press. ISBN 9780817311063.
- Stock, Catherine McNicol (2017) [1996]. Rural Radicals: Righteous Rage in the American Grain (2nd ed.). Cornell University Press. ISBN 9781501714054.
- Turner, James (1980). "Understanding the Populists". The Journal of American History. 67 (2): 354–373. doi:10.2307/1890413. JSTOR 1890413.
- White, Richard (2017). The Republic for Which It Stands: The United States During Reconstruction and the Gilded Age: 1865–1896. New York: Oxford University Press. ISBN 9780190619060.
- Woodward, C. Vann (2016) [1938]. Tom Watson: Agrarian Rebel. Pickle Partner's Publishing. ISBN 9781787202566. online edition Archived 2010-01-21 at the Wayback Machine
- Woodward, C. Vann. "Tom Watson and the Negro in Agrarian Politics," The Journal of Southern History, Vol. 4, No. 1 (Feb., 1938), pp. 14–33 in JSTOR

=== Contemporary accounts ===
- Gompers, Samuel (July 1892). "Organized Labor in the Campaign". The North American Review. 155 (428): 91–97.
- Dolph, Senator Joseph N. (January 1893). "Does the Republican Party Need Reorganization?". The North American Review. 156 (434): 54–61.
- Peffer, Senator William A. (December 1893). "The Mission of the Populist Party". The North American Review. 157 (445): 665–679. Archived from the original on February 16, 2012.
- Lewelling, L. D. (January 1895). "Problems Before the Western Farmer". The North American Review. 160 (458): 16–21.
- Stahl, John M. (September 1896). "Are the Farmers Populists?". The North American Review. 163 (478): 266–276.
- Trent, W. P. (January 1897). "Dominant Forces in Southern Life". The Atlantic Monthly. 79 (471): 42–53.
- Turner, Frederick J. (April 1897). "Dominant Forces in Western Life". The Atlantic Monthly. 79 (474): 433–443.
- Peffer, Senator William A. (January 1898). "The Passing of the People's Party". The North American Review. 166 (494): 12–24.
