= Farmers' Alliance =

Agrarian economic movement in late 19th century America

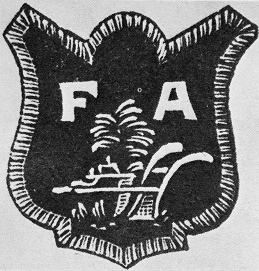
- Badge of the Farmer's Alliance
- Abbreviation: FA
- Members: • National Farmers's Alliance (Northern) • National Farmers' Alliance and Industrial Union (White Southerners) • National Alliance and Cooperative Union (Black Southerners)
- Part of: Farmers' Movement
- Founded: 1877
- Dissolved: 1890s
- Preceded by: The Grange
- Succeeded by: People's Party
- Newspaper: see below
- Ideology: Agrarianism; Left-wing populism Progressivism; Land reform Monetary reform
- Political position: Left-wing

The Farmers' Alliance was an organized agrarian economic movement among American farmers that developed and flourished ca. 1875. The movement included several parallel but independent political organizations: the National Farmers' Alliance and Industrial Union among the white farmers of the South; the National Farmers' Alliance among the white and black farmers of the Midwest and High Plains, where the Granger movement had been strong; and the Colored Farmers' National Alliance and Cooperative Union, consisting of the African American farmers of the South.

One of the goals of the organization was to end the adverse effects of the crop-lien system on farmers in the period following the American Civil War. The alliance also generally supported the government regulation of the transportation industry, establishment of an income tax in order to restrict speculative profits, and the adoption of an inflationary relaxation of the nation's money supply as a means of easing the burden of repayment of loans by debtors. The Farmers' Alliance moved into politics in the early 1890s under the banner of the People's Party, commonly known as the "Populists."

== Background ==
=== Agricultural crisis in the Midwest and Plains ===
First banner of the Southern Farmers' Alliance, organized on a statewide basis in Texas in 1878

The quest to achieve a first transcontinental railroad across the U.S. was delayed somewhat by the American Civil War before being finally completed in May 1869. There followed a rush to complete additional railway lines to open up new frontier areas for economic development, a situation in which the United States government and the great railroad companies of the day maintained a common interest. Rather than directly undertaking railroad construction as a public works project of the federal government, Congress granted cash loans and grants of public land to subsidize construction. Some 129 million acres (52.2 million hectares) of public land was ultimately transferred from public ownership to the privately owned railways as part of this process.

A great part of this massive stockpile of land needed to be converted into cash by the railways to finance their building activities, since railroad construction was a costly undertaking. New settlement had to be attracted to the virgin lands west of the Missouri River, which had been previously regarded by the public as worthless to the needs of agriculture due to insufficiencies of the soil as well as the arid climate. Millions of advertising dollars were spent by the railway companies promoting the agricultural development of the land which they had to sell. This effort was to be rewarded, particularly after the Panic of 1873 left many unemployed and seeking a new start. Settlers began to flood into the Midwest and Northern Great Plains in response to the railway companies' blandishments.

Populations skyrocketed. Kansas grew from a population of just under 365,000 to nearly a million people during the 1870s. The number of inhabitants in Nebraska nearly tripled, rising to nearly half a million. Iowa, Minnesota, and the Dakota Territory showed parallel population gains. New counties, villages, and towns sprang up by the hundreds throughout the region, and a speculative bubble emerged around the buying and selling of farmland and urban lots. Population continued to surge throughout the region well into the 1880s.

Unfortunately for those who chose to attempt to farm new lands in such places as Kansas, Nebraska, the Dakotas, and eastern Colorado, the unusually rainy years of the early 1880s which had buoyed land prices gave way to a protracted drought beginning in the summer of 1887, bringing an end to the giddy, speculative boom. With crops failing, artificially inflated land prices plummeted; eastern capital began to withdraw from the region; banks collapsed, and credit dried up; a decade of hard times followed, marked by the abandonment of entire communities. A sense of deep discontent with the current state of affairs was felt by the farmers who remained.

=== Agricultural crisis in the southeast ===
The agrarian and plantation-based economy of the Southern United States was virtually destroyed by the Civil War. Those who had their fortunes invested in Confederate bonds and currency saw them lost, as did those whose wealth was tied up in the ownership of African American slaves. Great landed estates were broken up or rendered unworkable by the lack of a free labor supply, and the flood of land sold on the market depressed prices and reduced the economic possibilities of those who counted their dollars in acres.

The region faced enormous costs to replace the buildings destroyed in the war and the factories looted. The capacity of the gutted financial market to make loans was grossly insufficient for the needs of the region, exemplified by the 123 counties in Georgia with no banks whatsoever even in 1895. Merchants, finding a sellers' market, extracted extraordinary profits through inflated prices and usurious credit terms.

A new mode of production replaced the slave-based large-scale agriculture of the pre-war years. Now it would be small-scale agrarian enterprise that would proliferate and the emergence of the so-called "share system" or "cropping system," in which non-landowners paid rent for the use of the land they farmed in the form of a fixed percentage of the output generated. This system in theory served the needs of landowners and poor farmers alike, as the sharecroppers would have the incentive to produce more and benefit from increased output while landowners would be provided with a labor source to produce upon the land they held without the necessity of paying cash wages.

In practice, however, a system of virtual slavery emerged, in which poor whites and freed blacks became enmeshed in the usury of merchants and landowners providing essential supplies on credit. A crop-lien system emerged in which future crops would be mortgaged to merchants or landowners (often one and the same) in exchange for credit for current purchases. Written contracts made these loans legally enforceable and those so enmeshed frequently found themselves forced to pay inflated prices at high rates of interest. If the value of the credit exceeded the cash value of the crop, the arrangement was automatically rolled over for another year and a never-ending cycle amounting to a condition of perpetual servitude resulted.

Moreover, this crop-lien system contributed to the establishment of a cotton monoculture, as merchants demanded this easily storable, readily marketable commodity to be produced for the satisfaction of debt. Not accidentally, the requirement by merchants for cotton production made production of adequate food and fodder for sustenance virtually impossible, further deepening the debt of the farmer to his merchant-creditor. A sense of deep discontent with the current state of affairs was felt by the small-holding and tenant farmers of the South.

== Organizational histories ==
=== Northern Alliance ===
The National Farmers' Alliance, commonly known as the "Northern Alliance," was established on March 21, 1877, by a group of members of the Grange movement from New York state. The group sought to organize in order to fight what they deemed the unfair practices of the railroad transportation mill, for the reform of the tax system, and for the legalization of Grange-sponsored insurance companies.

This first organization proved largely ineffectual but does seem to have provided the inspiration for the first effective Alliance group, which was established on April 15, 1880, by newspaper editor Milton George in Chicago. George's paper, Western Rural, gave the new organization public exposure and inspired the establishment of chartered local organizations, beginning in Filley, Nebraska, and soon spreading throughout the American Midwest. Dues were not collected in the earliest phase of Northern Alliance's existence, with editor George financing the group's launch — a fact which spurred growth. Within a month more than 200 locals had been chartered, with claims made that 1,000 local groups had been established by the end of the organization's first year.

The Northern Alliance made its greatest inroads in areas which were stricken by drought in 1881, including the states of Kansas, Nebraska, Iowa, and Minnesota. Growth was slower in states less severely affected, including as Illinois, Wisconsin, and Michigan. Local organizations proved easier to launch than did statewide bodies and in its first years the Alliance was dominated by these local groups, with state-level bodies floundering. The locals did organize themselves at the state level, however, with delegates gathering in founding conventions in Nebraska, Kansas, Iowa, Wisconsin, Illinois, Minnesota and Michigan between January 1881 and the middle of 1882.

The new movement strove to protect farmers from the capitalistic and industrial powers of monopolies (such as railroads) and unsympathetic public officials. The Northern Alliance sought to enact a more equitable tax system on mortgage property, pass income tax law, abolish free travel passes to public officials, and regulate interstate commerce by Congress.

By the time of the organization's 2nd Annual Convention, held early in October 1881, the organization claimed a membership of 24,500. A year hence, at the 3rd Convention of October 1882, some 2,000 locals and a total membership of 100,000 was claimed. This proved to be a high-water mark for the organization, however, as prosperity returned to Midwestern agriculture in 1883 and the 4th Convention was poorly attended and no convention was held at all in 1884. With work to do and money to be made, early enthusiasm in the new radical reform organization fell precipitously. Even National Secretary Milton George lost heart, publishing less and less news of the Farmers' Alliance in his newspaper's pages. State and local organizations became moribund.

A fall of wheat and livestock prices following the harvest of 1884 reinvigorated the Farmers' Alliance and activity again exploded. In 1885 a new Alliance group was established for the Dakota Territory, where wheat reigned supreme, followed by a state organization for Colorado, as interest spread westward. New national principles were composed and mailed out to the entire readership of Western Rural and a 5th Convention was successfully held in November 1886. A system of dues was established, thereby funding and energizing the state organizations.

The program of the organization became steadily more radical in this interval, including demands for government ownership of one or more of the intercontinental railroad lines as well as for unlimited coinage of silver at its historic ratio to gold. Connections began to be forged with the Knights of Labor, the leading industrial trade union organization of the day. Ten state organizations were fully functioning by 1890 and new members flooded into the Farmers' Alliance at the rate of 1,000 per week. Kansas alone boasted 130,000 members, closely followed by Nebraska, the Dakotas, and Minnesota, and the national office optimistically projected 2 million members in the near future.

The idea emerged to put this enthusiastic and growing membership to work to advance the group's goals through a political organization.

=== Southern Alliance ===
Dr. Charles W. Macune, a top leader of the Southern Farmers' Alliance.

The roots of the National Farmers' Alliance and Industrial Union, commonly known as the "Southern Alliance," dated back to approximately 1875, when a group of ranchers in Lampasas County, Texas, organized as a Texas Alliance as a means of cooperating to apprehend horse thieves, round up stray animals, and cooperatively purchase large stores of supplies. This group gradually moved into more extensive action in response to the perceived abuses towards smaller operators engaged in by land speculators and massive cattle operations. The organization grew and was organized on a statewide basis in 1878 but was almost immediately killed when it attempted to enter the political field and was torn asunder by antagonistic factions favoring the Democratic and Greenback parties.

In 1879 the influence of the Northern Alliance made itself felt in Parker County, Texas, when a new group was established there by a former member of the Lampasas County Alliance group. The Northern Alliance's constitution and its precedent of non-partisan activity were closely followed and in short order a dozen local groups had been established upon that model. This Texas group was incorporated in 1880 as the "Farmers' State Alliance" and it subsequently expanded throughout the Central and Northern parts of the state and into the neighboring Indian Territory (today's Oklahoma). By the end of 1885 this growing organization claimed a membership of approximately 50,000, scattered between more than 1200 local groups, known as "Sub-Alliances."

During the early 1880s this Texas Farmers' State Alliance was considered to be a loose part of the Northern Alliance organization. Owing to the lack of dues of the national group in this period, such a relationship was more theoretical than practical. The adoption of a dues system in the middle part of the decade forced the Texas group to closely consider its organizational affiliation.

Charles W. Macune, the son of a Methodist preacher, emerged as the leader of this Texas organization when he was elected chairman of the executive committee of the Texas organization in 1886. Macune immediately stifled an impending split of the organization threatened by a faction inside the Texas Alliance pushing to launch the group as an independent political party. He then united the group around a vision of organizational independence from the Northern Alliance coupled with a program of active expansion. As a first step towards this end, Macune negotiated a merger with the Louisiana Farmers' Union, a group established in 1880 and transformed into a secret society in 1885. The groups were joined under a new name, the National Farmers' Alliance and Cooperative Union of America.

This was one of the first steps in unifying farmers along the American cotton belt. The demands of the Southern Alliance were similar to those of its northern counterpart. They pressed for abolition of national banks and monopolies, free coinage of silver, issuance of paper money (Greenback or Fiat money), loans on land, establishment of sub-treasuries, income tax acts, and revision of tariffs.

In 1889 the National Farmers' Alliance and Cooperative Union united with a large rival organization known as the Agricultural Wheel to form a new group called the National Farmers' and Laborers' Union of America. Negotiations were begun to further unify forces by joining this newly expanded Southern Alliance with its Northern Alliance counterpart. While merger of the two organizations would have created a larger and more powerful organization, unity was stalled over terms of the union, including the composition of the governing bodies, divergent views on non-white membership, and disagreement over program owing to divergence between Southern and Northern farmers' economic interests.

At its December 1889 convention in St. Louis, the National Farmers' and Laborers' Union of America changed its name again, this time to the National Farmers' Alliance and Industrial Union — the name by which it would be known for the rest of its existence.

=== Colored Alliance ===
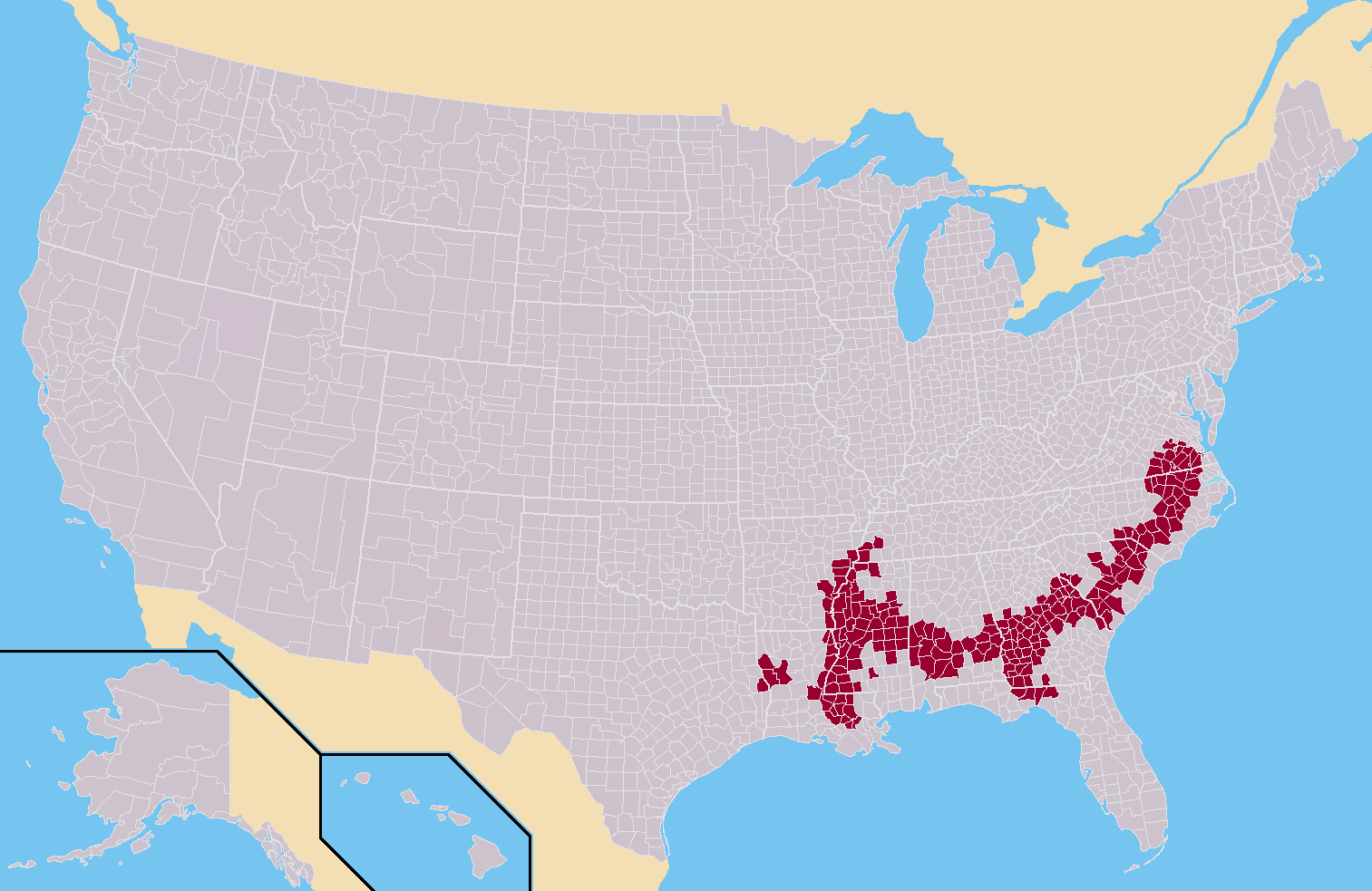
Counties with at least a 40% African-American population in 2000

The Southern Farmers' Alliance was unapologetic about its color bar banning black farmers from membership. The Alliance's National Secretary-Treasurer J.H. Turner, himself the son of a former slave-owner, wrote that in fact the liberated slaves' "worst enemies" had been the Northern carpetbaggers of the Reconstruction era, who "promised each head of family forty acres of land and a mule if only he would vote right."

Moreover, Turner noted, the liberated slaves of the South had been promised "social equality with the whites, and a great many other things which, since he has found out better, he neither needs nor wants." Turner argued that relations between the races were fundamentally benevolent now that black farmers had recognized that "his old master" had "almost invariably" been on hand to provide "the best advice" regarding agricultural problems and had very often been the one to "protect and defend him in his business affairs."

Such a view of the indebted and impoverished black sharecroppers of the South, also typical of Southern whites of the era, did nothing to reassure African-American farmers that their concerns were shared by their European-American counterparts. With their presence from the Southern Farmers' Alliance barred due to racism, African-American farmers were forced to establish an organization of their own.

In December 1886 a group of black farmers organized themselves in Houston County, Texas as the Alliance of Colored Farmers of Texas — forerunner of the Colored Farmers' National Alliance and Cooperative Union, commonly known as the "Colored Farmers' Alliance." A declaration of principles was adopted which identified the new organization as a mutual aid society dedicated to education, improvement of agricultural efficiency, and the raising of funds for collective benefits for "sick or disabled members, or their distressed families." The initial form of the organization was that of a secret society.

In February 1887 the group was chartered under the laws of Texas as the Alliance of Colored Farmers. This was followed by a convention in Lovelady, Texas held on March 14, 1888, at which the group was redefined as national in scope under the name Colored Farmers' National Alliance and Cooperative Union. A national newspaper was launched by the organization called The National Alliance.

The organization rapidly spread across the American South, establishing a presence in every Southern state of the union.

The Colored Farmers' Alliance sponsored cooperative stores at which members could obtain necessary goods at reduced prices, published newspapers which attempted to educate members of the organization as to new farming techniques, and in some places raised money to help support the underfunded segregated black schools of the region.

The Colored Farmers' Alliance's organizational strength peaked in 1891, with some 1.2 million members claimed.

== Opposition ==
The Alliance was opposed by a group called the Knights of Reciprocity, founded in Garden City, Kansas in winter of 1890 by a group of Republicans including Jesse Taylor, D. M. Frost and S. R. Peters. By 1895 the Knights claimed 125,000 members and had lodges in Kansas, Missouri, Iowa, Arkansas, Tennessee, Louisiana, Mississippi, North Carolina, South Carolina and Ohio. Founders included Masons, Oddfellows and Pythians. Its program included trade reciprocity, protection of American industries, just pensions for Union veterans and disenfranchisement of those who accepted or offered a bribe for a vote.

The Knights were adamant in their opposition to what they called the Democratic Union Labor - Farmers Alliance combination in politics. One of their circulars from 1891 reads:

The only way for the farmers to meet the Alliance secret political society is with a secret society the object of which shall not be to nominate men for office, but to assist in educating the people and making them thoroughly acquainted with the wants of all the people and the fallacies of the Alliance "calamity" howlers, who are traveling from State to State, county to county, town to town, township to township, schoolhouse to schoolhouse, not for the good of the people, but for the money they make and in hopes of political promotion. The people should organize at once in opposition to this gigantic scheme.

== Agenda and achievements ==
As a widespread movement consisting of three independent branches and existing for more than two decades, reduction of the Farmers' Alliance to a few universal objectives is problematic. As Southern Alliance leader C.W. Macune noted in 1891, the agenda of the organization was both amorphous and dynamic, a response to local problems and conditions:

No man ... can give a perfect definition of the purposes of the Farmers' Alliance; and he who attempts a definition simply gives his own personal conception of the subject, which may be more or less valuable, according to whether his field of observation and his accuracy of judgment are good or otherwise. In a broad sense, the purposes of the Farmers' Alliance ... cover today a remedy for every evil known to exist and afflict farmers and other producers, and in the future should cover every contingency that may arise, presenting evil to be combatted by means of organization; they are accumulative and ever changing, as the enemy assumes a new guise.

Included among these concerns to greater or lesser extent were the question of exploitative terms of credit, insufficient money supply to sustain the economic needs of society, super-profits extracted by merchants, millers, and other middlemen, systemically unfavorable terms of trade levied upon small-scale agricultural shippers by the railroad industry, negative impacts on land prices caused by speculation.

The accomplishments of the Farmers' Alliance are numerous. For example, many Alliance chapters all set up their own cooperative stores, which bought directly from wholesalers and sold their goods to farmers at a lower rate, at times 20 to 30 percent below the regular retail price. Such stores achieved only limited success, however, since they faced the hostility of wholesale merchants who sometimes retaliated by temporarily lowering their prices in order to drive the Alliance stores out of business.

Additionally, the Farmer's Alliance established its own mills for flour, cottonseed oil, and corn, as well as its own cotton gin. Such facilities allowed debt-laden farmers, who often had little cash to pay third-party mills, to bring their goods to markets at a lower cost.

=== National agenda ===
The limited effects of the local policies of the Alliance did little to address the overall problem of deflation and depressed agricultural prices. By 1886, tensions had begun to form in the movement between the political activists, who promoted a national political agenda, and the political conservatives, who favored no change in national policy but a "strictly business" plan of local economic action. In Texas, the split reached a climax in August 1886 at the statewide convention in Cleburne. The political activists successfully lobbied for passage of a set of political demands that included support of the Knights of Labor and the Great Southwest Railroad Strike of 1886. Other demands include changes in governmental land policy, and railroad regulation. The demands also included a demand for use of silver as legal tender, on the grounds that this would alleviate the contraction in the money supply that led to falling prices and scarcity of credit (see gold standard).

The Alliance wanted to change the way Americans worked by pushing for an eight-hour workday. It did away with national banks so private, local banks could be formed. The Alliance wanted an income tax, the freedom to coin its own money and the freedom to borrow money from the government to buy land. The Alliance also tried to do away with foreign competitors who owned land in America. It wanted to directly elect federal judges and senators. The Alliance gained powerful political strength and controlled elections in states in the South and the West.

In the South, the agenda centered on demands of government control of transportation and communication, in order to break the power of corporate monopolies. From 1890 it also included a demand for a national "Sub-Treasury Plan" calling for the establishment of a network of government-owned warehouses for the storage of non-perishable agricultural commodities, operated at minimal cost to participating farmers. Farmers would then be permitted to draw low interest loans of up to 80% of the value of warehoused goods, payable in U.S. Treasury notes, under the plan. The failure of the Democratic Party to endorse this initiative was instrumental in causing the Farmers' Alliance to become directly involved in partisan politics through an organization largely of its own making, the People's Party.

The Southern Alliance also demanded reforms of currency, land ownership, and income tax policies. Meanwhile, the Northern Alliance stressed the demand for free coinage of large amounts of silver.

Political activists in the movement also made attempts to unite the two Alliance organizations, along with the Knights of Labor and the Colored Farmers' National Alliance and Cooperative Union, into a common movement. The efforts and unification proved futile, however.

=== Transition to the Populist movement ===
As an economic movement, the Alliance had a very limited and short-term success. Cotton brokers who had previously negotiated with individual farmers for ten bales at a time now needed to strike deals with the Alliance men for 1,000 bale sales. This solidarity was usually short-lived, however, and could not withstand the retaliation from the commodities brokers and railroads, who responded by boycotting the Alliance and eventually broke the power of the movement. The Alliance had never fielded its own political candidates. It preferred to work through the established Republican Party in the Midwest and Democratic Party in the South — although these often proved fickle in supporting the agenda of the Alliance.

The Alliance failed as an economic movement, but it is regarded by historians as engendering a "movement culture" among the rural poor. This failure prompted an evolution of the Alliance into a political movement to field its own candidates in national elections. In 1889–1890, the Alliance was reborn as the People's Party (commonly known as the "Populists"), and included both Alliance men and Knights of Labor members from the industrialized Northeast. The Populists, who fielded national candidates in the 1892 election, essentially repeated all the demands of the Alliance in its platform.

== Elected officials ==
- Ezra T. Champlin, member of the Minnesota House of Representatives and its 20th Speaker.
- James Cockrell, member of the Illinois House of Representatives from Marion County (1891–1893)
- Marion Butler, U.S. Senator from North Carolina (1895–1901)
- Hosea H. Moore, member of the Illinois House of Representatives from Wayne County (1891–1893)
- John Rankin Rogers, Governor of Washington (1897–1901)
- Herman Taubeneck, member of the Illinois House of Representatives from Clark County (1891–1893)

== Select newspapers ==
- American Nonconformist, Tabor, Iowa. Edited by Henry Vincent.
- Alliance Vindicator, Texas. Edited by James H. Davis.
- Kansas Farmer, Topeka, Kansas. Edited by William A. Peffer.
- National Alliance, Houston, Texas. —No copies known to have survived.
- National Economist, Washington, D.C. Edited by Charles William Macune.
- Progressive Farmer, Raleigh, North Carolina. Edited by Leonidas LaFayette Polk.
- Southern Mercury, Dallas, Texas. Edited by Harry Tracy.
- Western Rural and Family Farm Paper, Chicago, Illinois. Edited by Milton George.

== See also ==
- Agricultural Wheel
- William Jennings Bryan
