= Crop-lien system =

System and type of sharecropping

The crop-lien system was a credit system that became widely used by cotton farmers in the United States in the South from the 1860s to the 1940s.

== History ==
In the crop-lien system, sharecroppers and tenant farmers, who did not own the land they worked, obtained supplies and food on credit from local merchants. The merchants held a lien on their cotton crop, and the merchants and landowners were the first ones paid from its sale. What was left over went to the farmer. The system ended in the 1940s as many poor farmers moved permanently to cities and towns, where jobs were plentiful because of World War II.

After the American Civil War, farmers in the South had little cash. During the war, British interests had invested in cotton plantations in Egypt and India, resulting in an oversupply of the commodity. Cotton prices dropped below the levels enjoyed in the 1850s. The crop-lien system was a way for farmers, White and Black, to get credit before the planting season by borrowing against the value of anticipated harvests. Local merchants provided food and supplies all year long on credit; when the cotton crop was harvested farmers turned it over to the merchant to pay back their debt. In some cases, the crop did not cover the debt, and the farmer either secretly moved out or started the next year in the red. Additionally, sharecroppers had no mules or tools, but tenant farmers had them and commanded a larger share of the crop. The owner took the rest. At harvest time, the merchant collected his debts from the sale of the crop.

The merchants had to borrow the money to buy supplies and, in turn, charged the farmer interest as well as a higher price for merchandise bought on such credit. The merchant insisted that more cotton (or some other cash crop) be grown (nothing else paid well) and thus came to dictate the crops that a farmer grew.

Many plantations saw the profit local merchants made off their sharecroppers and created their own plantation stores. These operated on the same principle but further concentrated the community wealth.

== See also ==
- Sharecropping, a related system of agriculture that also developed in the post-Civil War South.
- Caspiana Plantation Store, a historical building that once exemplified the use of the crop-lien system between 1906 and 1942.
