= 1884–85 United States Senate elections =

1884–1885 United States Senate elections
- Dates vary by state
- Class 3

27 of the 76 seats in the United States Senate (as well as special elections) 39 seats needed for a majority
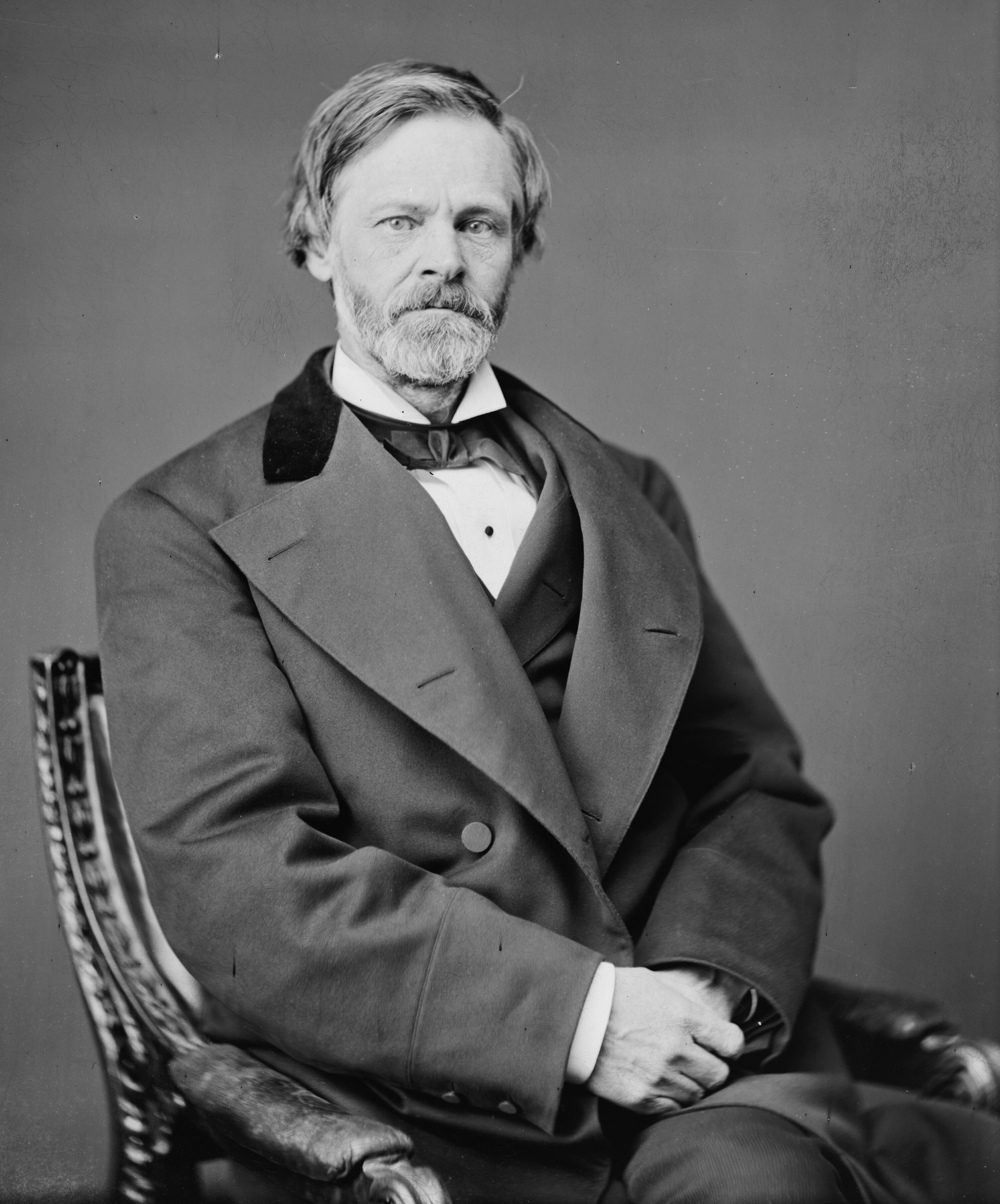

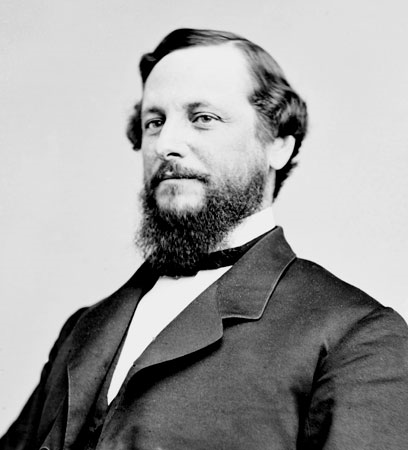

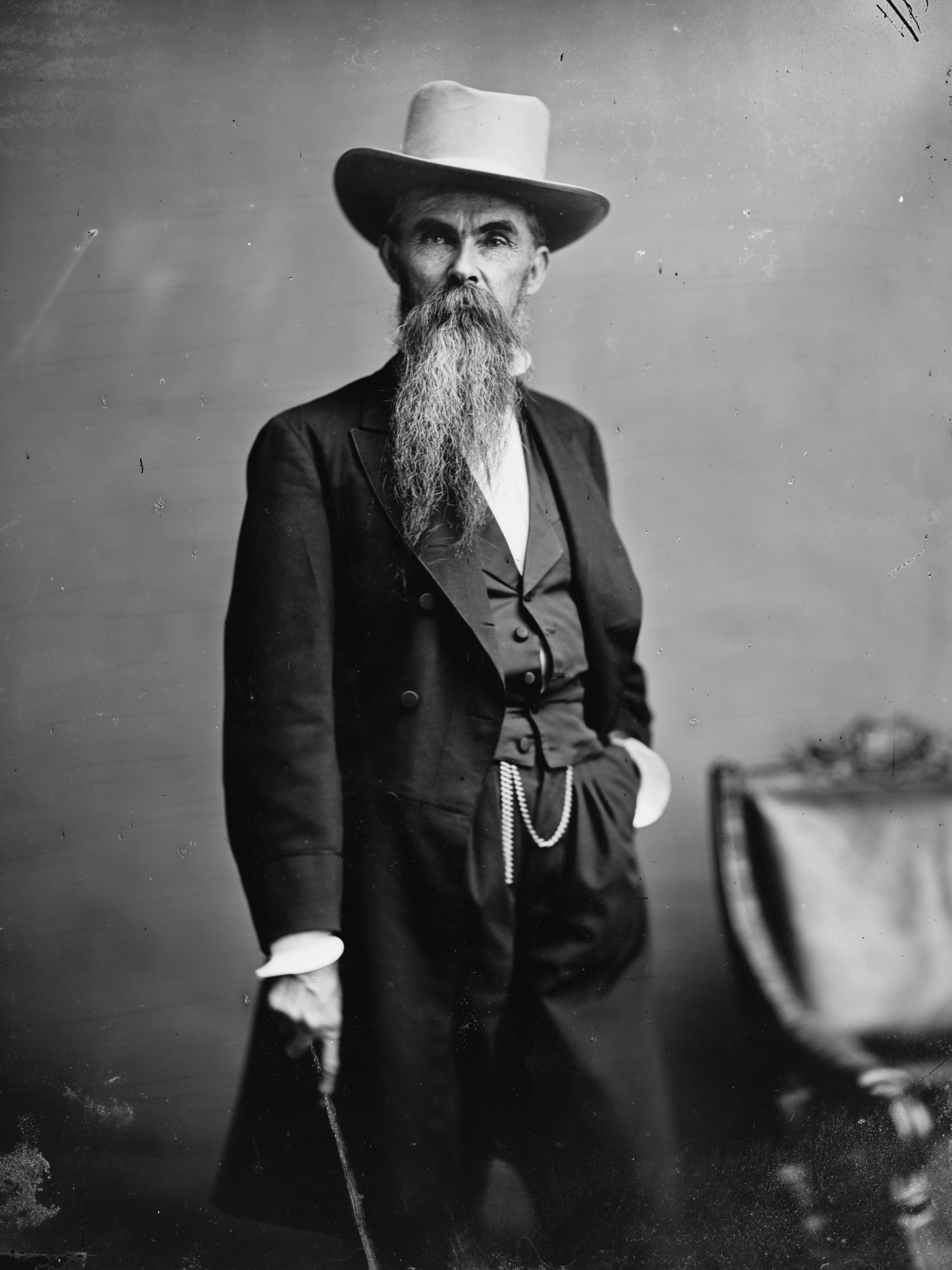
	Majority party	Minority party	Third party
Leader	John Sherman (Note: as Republican Conference Chair)	George H. Pendleton (Note: as Democratic Caucus Chair) (Lost re-election)	William Mahone (Note: as leader of the Readjuster Party)
Party	Republican	Democratic	Readjuster
Leader since	March 4, 1883	March 4, 1881	March 4, 1881
Leader's seat	Ohio	Ohio	Virginia
Seats before	38	36	2
Seats won	10	12	0
Seats after	37	34	2
Seat change	▼1	▼2	Steady
Seats up	11	14	0
- Results of the elections: Republican gain Republican hold Democratic hold Legislature failed to elect
Majority Party before election
Republican
Elected Majority Party
Republican

The 1884–85 United States Senate elections were held on various dates in various states, coinciding with the presidential election of 1884. As these U.S. Senate elections were prior to the ratification of the Seventeenth Amendment in 1913, senators were chosen by state legislatures. Senators were elected over a wide range of time throughout 1884 and 1885, and a seat may have been filled months late or remained vacant due to legislative deadlock. In these elections, terms were up for the senators in Class 3.

With three state legislatures failing to elect their senators in time, both Republicans and Democrats lost seats. Republicans, nevertheless, retained majority control and the Readjusters joined their caucus. By the beginning of the first session, in December 1885, Republicans had won all three vacant seats, increasing their majority.

== Results summary ==
Senate party division, 49th Congress (1885–1887)

- Majority party: Republican (42)
- Minority party: Democratic (34)
- Other parties: (0)
- Total seats: 76

== Change in Senate composition ==
=== Before the elections ===
D_{8}	D_{7}	D_{6}	D_{5}	D_{4}	D_{3}	D_{2}	D_{1}		
D_{9}	D_{10}	D_{11}	D_{12}	D_{13}	D_{14}	D_{15}	D_{16}	D_{17}	D_{18}
D_{28} Ran	D_{27} Ran	D_{26} Ran	D_{25} Ran	D_{24} Ran	D_{23} Ran	D_{22}	D_{21}	D_{20}	D_{19}
D_{29} Ran	D_{30} Ran	D_{31} Ran	D_{32} Ran	D_{33} Unknown	D_{34} Retired	D_{35} Retired	D_{36} Retired	RA_{1}	RA_{2}
Majority, with Readjusters in caucus →									R_{38} Retired
R_{29} Ran	R_{30} Ran	R_{31} Ran	R_{32} Ran	R_{33} Ran	R_{34} Ran	R_{35} Unknown	R_{36} Unknown	R_{37} Retired	R_{38} Retired
R_{28} Ran	R_{27}	R_{26}	R_{25}	R_{24}	R_{23}	R_{22}	R_{21}	R_{20}	R_{19}
R_{9}	R_{10}	R_{11}	R_{12}	R_{13}	R_{14}	R_{15}	R_{16}	R_{17}	R_{18}
R_{8}	R_{7}	R_{6}	R_{5}	R_{4}	R_{3}	R_{2}	R_{1}		

=== After the elections ===
D_{8}	D_{7}	D_{6}	D_{5}	D_{4}	D_{3}	D_{2}	D_{1}		
D_{9}	D_{10}	D_{11}	D_{12}	D_{13}	D_{14}	D_{15}	D_{16}	D_{17}	D_{18}
D_{28} Re-elected	D_{27} Re-elected	D_{26} Re-elected	D_{25} Re-elected	D_{24} Re-elected	D_{23} Re-elected	D_{22}	D_{21}	D_{20}	D_{19}
D_{29} Re-elected	D_{30} Hold	D_{31} Hold	D_{32} Hold	D_{33} Hold	D_{34} Hold	V_{1} D Loss	V_{2} R Loss	V_{3} R Loss	RA_{1}
Majority due to three vacancies ↓									RA_{2}
R_{29} Re-elected	R_{30} Re-elected	R_{31} Re-elected	R_{32} Re-elected	R_{33} Re-elected	R_{34} Hold	R_{35} Hold	R_{36} Hold	R_{37} Gain	RA_{2}
R_{28} Re-elected	R_{27}	R_{26}	R_{25}	R_{24}	R_{23}	R_{22}	R_{21}	R_{20}	R_{19}
R_{9}	R_{10}	R_{11}	R_{12}	R_{13}	R_{14}	R_{15}	R_{16}	R_{17}	R_{18}
R_{8}	R_{7}	R_{6}	R_{5}	R_{4}	R_{3}	R_{2}	R_{1}		

=== Beginning of the first session, December 7, 1885 ===
D_{8}	D_{7}	D_{6}	D_{5}	D_{4}	D_{3}	D_{2}	D_{1}		
D_{9}	D_{10}	D_{11}	D_{12}	D_{13}	D_{14}	D_{15}	D_{16}	D_{17}	D_{18}
D_{28}	D_{27}	D_{26}	D_{25}	D_{24}	D_{23}	D_{22}	D_{21}	D_{20}	D_{19}
D_{29}	D_{30}	D_{31}	D_{32}	D_{33}	D_{34}	RA_{1}	RA_{2}	R_{40} Gain	R_{39} Gain
Majority →									R_{39} Gain
R_{29}	R_{30}	R_{31}	R_{32}	R_{33}	R_{34}	R_{35}	R_{36}	R_{37}	R_{38} Gain
R_{28}	R_{27}	R_{26}	R_{25}	R_{24}	R_{23}	R_{22}	R_{21}	R_{20}	R_{19}
R_{9}	R_{10}	R_{11}	R_{12}	R_{13}	R_{14}	R_{15}	R_{16}	R_{17}	R_{18}
R_{8}	R_{7}	R_{6}	R_{5}	R_{4}	R_{3}	R_{2}	R_{1}		

Key:

D_{#}	Democratic
RA_{#}	Readjuster
R_{#}	Republican
V_{#}	Vacant

== Race summaries ==
=== Special elections during the 48th Congress ===
In this election, the winner was seated in 1885 before March 4.

State	Incumbent			Results	Candidates
State	Senator	Party	Electoral history	Results	Candidates
Rhode Island (Class 2)	William P. Sheffield	Republican	1884 (appointed)	Interim appointee retired when successor elected. New senator elected January 20, 1885. Republican hold.	▌ ✓ Jonathan Chace (Republican) [data missing]

=== Races leading to the 49th Congress ===
In these regular elections, the winners were elected for the term beginning March 4, 1885; ordered by state.

All of the elections involved the Class 3 seats.

State	Incumbent			Results	Candidates
State	Senator	Party	Electoral history	Results	Candidates
Alabama	James L. Pugh	Democratic	1880 (special)	Incumbent re-elected in August 1884.	▌ ✓ James L. Pugh (Democratic) [data missing]
Arkansas	James D. Walker	Democratic	1878	Incumbent retired. New senator elected in 1885. Democratic hold.	▌ ✓ James K. Jones (Democratic) [data missing]
California	James T. Farley	Democratic	1878	Incumbent retired. New senator elected in 1885. Republican gain.	▌ ✓ Leland Stanford (Republican) [data missing]
Colorado	Nathaniel P. Hill	Republican	1879	Incumbent lost renomination. New senator elected in 1885. Republican hold.	▌ ✓ Henry M. Teller (Republican) [data missing]
Connecticut	Orville H. Platt	Republican	1879	Incumbent re-elected in 1885.	▌ ✓ Orville H. Platt (Republican) [data missing]
Florida	Wilkinson Call	Democratic	1879	Incumbent re-elected January 20, 1885.	▌ ✓ Wilkinson Call (Democratic) [data missing]
Georgia	Joseph E. Brown	Democratic	1880 (special)	Incumbent re-elected in 1885.	▌ ✓ Joseph E. Brown (Democratic) [data missing]
Illinois	John A. Logan	Republican	1879	Incumbent retired or lost re-election. Legislature failed to elect. Republican loss. Incumbent was later elected to continue the vacant term; see below.	None.
Indiana	Daniel W. Voorhees	Democratic	1877 (appointed); 1879 (special)	Incumbent re-elected in 1885.	▌ ✓ Daniel W. Voorhees (Democratic) [data missing]
Iowa	William B. Allison	Republican	1872; 1878	Incumbent re-elected January 23, 1884.	▌ ✓ William B. Allison (Republican) 90; ▌Benton J. Hall (Democratic) 48; ▌David M. Clark (Greenback) 10; ▌La Vega G. Kinne (Unknown) 1
Kansas	John J. Ingalls	Republican	1873; 1879	Incumbent re-elected in 1885.	▌ ✓ John J. Ingalls (Republican) [data missing]
Kentucky	John Stuart Williams	Democratic	1878	Incumbent lost re-election. New senator elected February 6, 1884. Democratic hold.	▌ ✓ J. C. S. Blackburn (Democratic) 100; ▌ John Bennett (Republican) 9
Louisiana	Benjamin F. Jonas	Democratic	1879	Incumbent lost re-election. New senator elected in 1884 or 1885. Democratic hold.	▌ ✓ James B. Eustis (Democratic) [data missing]
Maryland	James Black Groome	Democratic	1878–79	Incumbent retired or lost re-election. New senator elected in 1884. Democratic hold.	▌ ✓ Ephraim K. Wilson II (Democratic) [data missing]
Missouri	George G. Vest	Democratic	1879	Incumbent re-elected in 1885.	▌ ✓ George G. Vest (Democratic) [data missing]
Nevada	John P. Jones	Republican	1873; 1879	Incumbent re-elected in 1885.	▌ ✓ John P. Jones (Republican) [data missing]
New Hampshire	Henry W. Blair	Republican	1879	Legislature failed to elect. Republican loss. Incumbent was later appointed, then elected, to continue the vacant term; see below.	[data missing]
New York	Elbridge G. Lapham	Republican	1881 (special)	Incumbent retired. New senator elected January 20, 1885. Republican hold.	▌ ✓ William M. Evarts (Republican) 92; ▌Edward Cooper (Democratic) 65
North Carolina	Zebulon Vance	Democratic	1879	Incumbent re-elected in 1884.	▌ ✓ Zebulon Vance (Democratic)
Ohio	George H. Pendleton	Democratic	1878–79	Incumbent lost renomination. New senator elected January 15, 1884. Democratic hold.	▌ ✓ Henry B. Payne (Democratic) [data missing]
Oregon	James H. Slater	Democratic	1878–79	Incumbent retired. Legislature failed to elect. Democratic loss.	[data missing]
Pennsylvania	J. Donald Cameron	Republican	1877 (special); 1879	Incumbent re-elected January 20, 1885.	▌ ✓ J. Donald Cameron (Republican) 64.94%; ▌William A. Wallace (Democratic) 27.49%; Others; see below
South Carolina	Wade Hampton III	Democratic	1878	Incumbent re-elected in 1884.	▌ ✓ Wade Hampton III (Democratic) [data missing]
Vermont	Justin S. Morrill	Republican	1866; 1872; 1878	Incumbent re-elected in 1884.	▌ ✓ Justin S. Morrill (Republican) [data missing]
Wisconsin	Angus Cameron	Republican	1881	Incumbent retired. New senator elected January 27, 1885. Republican hold.	▌ ✓ John C. Spooner (Republican) 61.29%; ▌ Edward S. Bragg (Democratic) 38.71%

=== Elections during the 49th Congress ===
In these elections, the winners were elected in 1885 after March 4, sorted by election date.

State	Incumbent			Results	Candidates
State	Senator	Party	Electoral history	Results	Candidates
Delaware (Class 1)	Thomas F. Bayard	Democratic	1869; 1875; 1881	Incumbent resigned March 6, 1885, to become U.S. Secretary of State. New senator elected March 18, 1885. Democratic hold.	▌ ✓ George Gray (Democratic) [data missing]
Arkansas (Class 2)	Augustus Garland	Democratic	1876; 1883	Incumbent resigned March 6, 1885, to become U.S. Attorney General. New senator elected March 20, 1885. Democratic hold.	▌ ✓ James H. Berry (Democratic) [data missing]
Illinois (Class 3)	Vacant			Legislature had failed to elect. New senator elected May 19, 1885. Republican gain.	▌ ✓ John A. Logan (Republican) 50.49%; ▌Lambert Tree (Democratic) 47.06%; ▌John C. Black (Democratic) 0.98%; ▌John R. Hoxie (Democratic) 0.49%; ▌William Ralls Morrison (Democratic) 0.49%; ▌Charles J. Schofield (Democratic) 0.49%
New Hampshire (Class 3)	Henry W. Blair	Republican	1879; 1885 (appointed)	Interim appointee elected June 17, 1885.	▌ ✓ Henry W. Blair (Republican) [data missing]
Oregon (Class 3)	Vacant			Legislature had failed to elect. New senator elected November 18, 1885. Republican gain.	▌ ✓ John H. Mitchell (Republican) [data missing]

== Complete list of races ==
=== Maryland ===
1884 United States Senate election in Maryland
- January 1884

80 members of the Maryland General Assembly
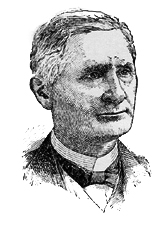
Candidate	Ephraim King Wilson II
Party	Democratic
Legislative vote	-
Percentage	-%	%

Ephraim King Wilson II was elected by an unknown margin of votes, for the Class 3 seat.

=== New York ===
The New York election was held January 20, 1885, by the New York State Legislature.

Republican Elbridge G. Lapham had been elected to this seat in a special election in 1881 to succeed Roscoe Conkling who had resigned. Lapham's term would expire on March 3, 1885.

At the State election in November 1883, 19 Republicans and 13 Democrats were elected for a two-year term (1884–1885) in the State Senate. At the State election in November 1884, 73 Republicans and 55 Democrats were elected for the session of 1885 to the Assembly. The 108th New York State Legislature met from January 6 to May 22, 1885, at Albany, New York.

The caucus of Republican State legislators met on January 19, President pro tempore of the State Senate Dennis McCarthy presided. 19 State senators and 73 assemblymen attended. The Evarts faction required the nomination to be made by viva voce vote, which was opposed by the Morton faction, but was carried by a vote of 64 to 28. The caucus nominated Ex-U.S. Secretary of State William M. Evarts on the first ballot.

1885 Republican caucus nominee
Candidate	First ballot
William M. Evarts	61
Levi P. Morton	28
Chauncey M. Depew	3

The Democratic caucus nominated Ex-Mayor of New York Edward Cooper.

William M. Evarts was the choice of both the Assembly and the State Senate, and was declared elected.

1885 United States Senator election result
House	Republican		Democratic	
State Senate (32 members)	William M. Evarts	19	Edward Cooper	13
State Assembly (128 members)	William M. Evarts	73	Edward Cooper	52

Note: The votes were cast on January 20, but both Houses met in a Joint session of the United States Congress on January 21 to compare nominations, and declare the result.

=== Ohio ===
In 1884, the Democrats held a majority in the Ohio legislature. In a caucus meeting to determine the party's choice for United States Senator, many Democratic legislators looked to replace the incumbent Senator, Democrat George H. Pendleton, because they disagreed with his advocacy of civil service reform and low tariffs. Some of Pendleton's opponents, led by Oliver Payne, promoted Henry B. Payne for the Senate seat, recalling his opposition to both of those positions during his time in the House. After a secret ballot by the Democratic caucus, Henry B. Payne received 46 out of 80 votes. Because Oliver was a trustee and treasurer of the Standard Oil company, many of the Pendleton supporters immediately alleged that $100,000 from the oil trust had been used to bribe Democratic legislators, and claimed that an open ballot would not have favored Payne.

When the full legislature met, Henry B. Payne was elected with 78 votes out of 120. The Democratic legislature initially refused to investigate their members' alleged corruption, but when Republicans regained the majority in the next session, the legislature looked into the allegations and forwarded the results to the federal Senate. The evidence gathered was voluminous, but the Senate declined to expel Payne, who proclaimed his innocence. While there was never enough evidence for definitive proof of bribery, biographer Dewayne Burke wrote that the "circumstantial evidence seems to convict Payne" of the charge.

=== Pennsylvania ===
The Pennsylvania election was held January 20, 1885. The Pennsylvania General Assembly convened January 20, 1885. Incumbent Republican J. Donald Cameron, who was elected in an 1877 special election and re-elected in 1879, was a successful candidate for re-election to another term. The results of the vote of both houses combined are as follows:

State legislature results
Party	Candidate	Votes	%
Republican	J. Donald Cameron (Inc.)	163	64.94
Democratic	William A. Wallace	69	27.49
Republican	A. W. Acheson	1	0.40
Republican	Charles N. Brumm	1	0.40
Republican	George Shiras Jr.	1	0.40
N/A	Not voting	14	5.58
Totals		251	100.00%

== See also ==
- 1884 United States elections
  - 1884 United States presidential election
  - 1884 United States House of Representatives elections
- 48th United States Congress
- 49th United States Congress
