= 1891 United States Senate election in Pennsylvania =

- January 20, 1891
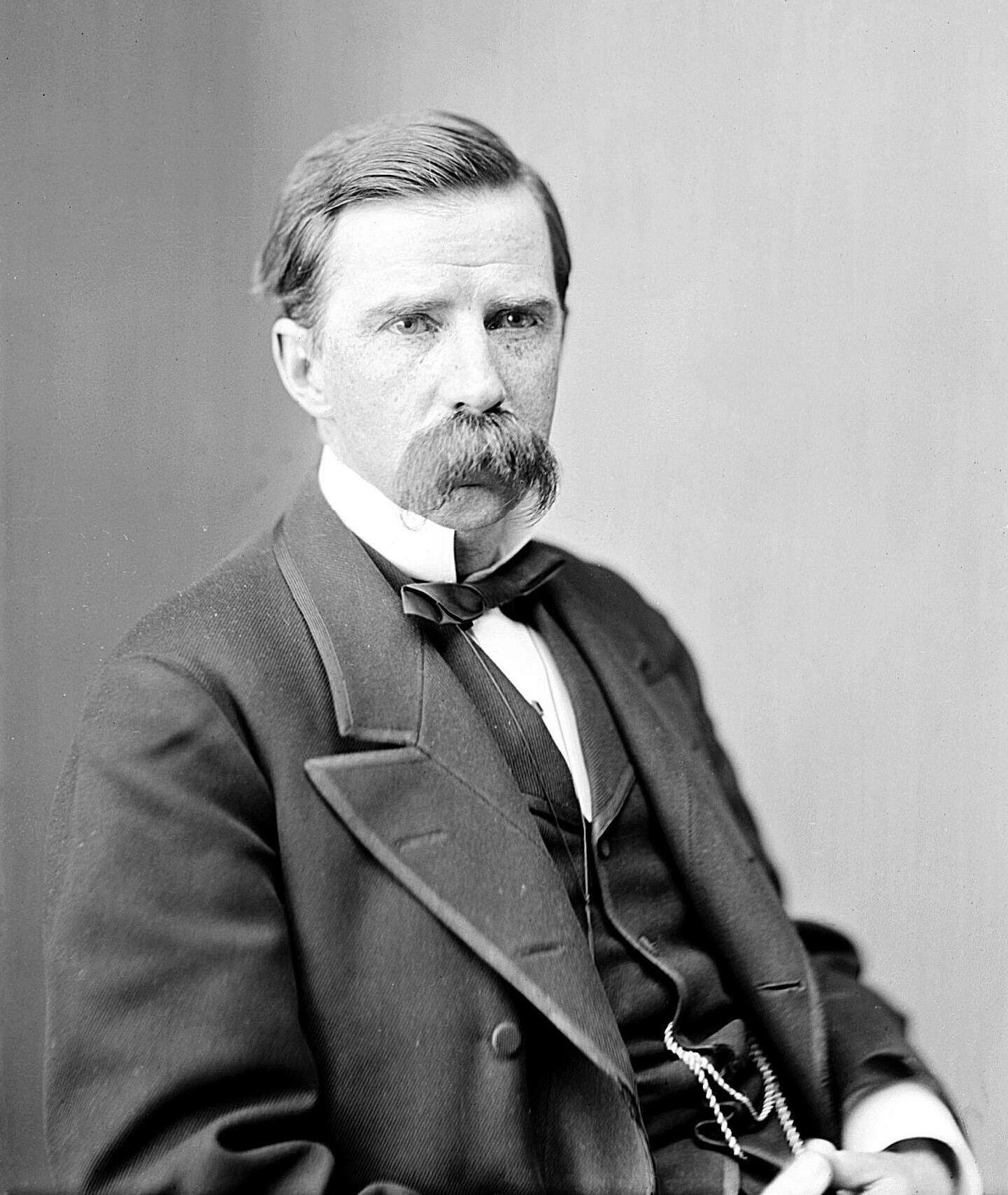

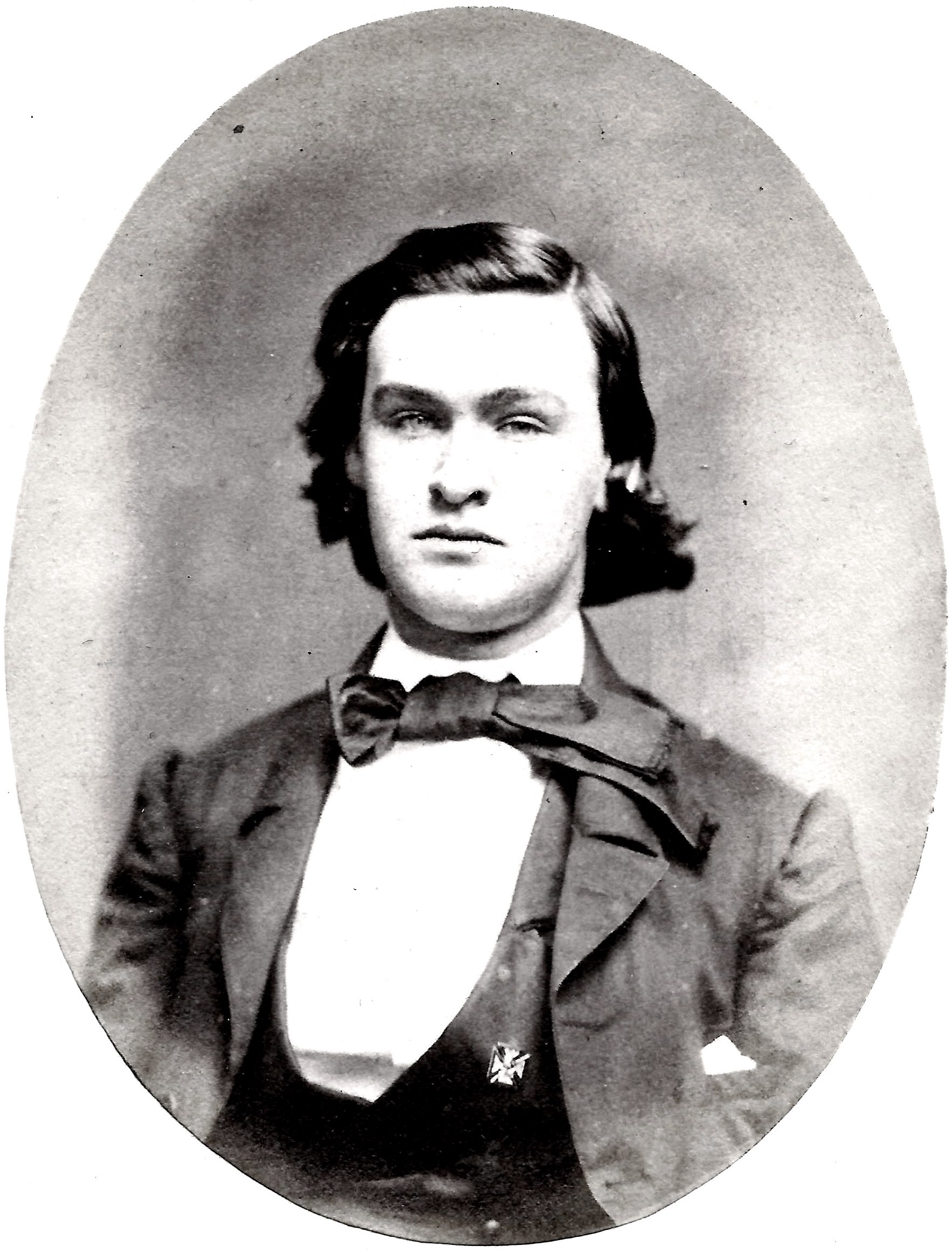
Nominee	J. Donald Cameron	Chauncey Forward Black
Party	Republican	Democratic
Leg. vote	144	94
Percentage	56.69%	37.01%
U.S. senator before election
J. Donald Cameron
Republican
Elected U.S. Senator
J. Donald Cameron
Republican

The 1891 United States Senate election in Pennsylvania was held on January 20, 1891. J. Donald Cameron was re-elected by the Pennsylvania General Assembly to the United States Senate.

== Results ==
The Pennsylvania General Assembly, consisting of the House of Representatives and the Senate, convened on January 20, 1891, to elect a senator to fill the term beginning on March 4, 1891. Incumbent Republican J. Donald Cameron, who was elected in an 1877 special election and re-elected in 1879 and 1885, was a successful candidate for re-election to another term. The results of the vote of both houses combined are as follows:

State legislature results
Party	Candidate	Votes	%
Republican	J. Donald Cameron (Inc.)	144	56.69
Democratic	Chauncey F. Black	94	37.01
Republican	Austin L. Taggart	7	2.76
Republican	Theodore L. Flood	3	1.18
Democratic	J. C. Sibley	1	0.39
Republican	Harry White	1	0.39
N/A	Not voting	4	1.57
Totals		254	100.00%

== See also ==
- 1890–91 United States Senate elections

Preceded by 1885	Pennsylvania U.S. Senate election (Class III); 1891	Succeeded by 1897
