= 1885 United States Senate election in Pennsylvania =

- January 20, 1885
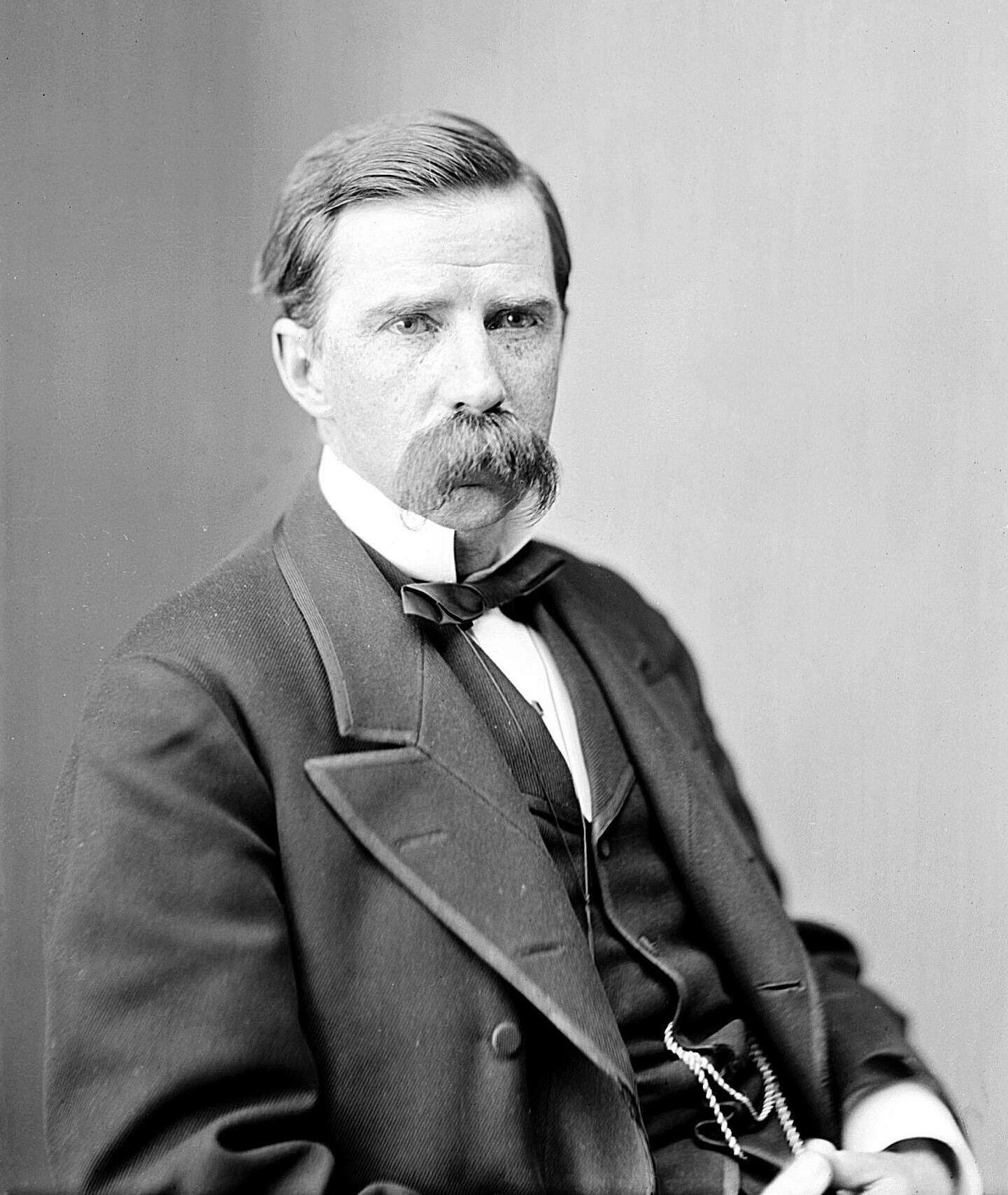

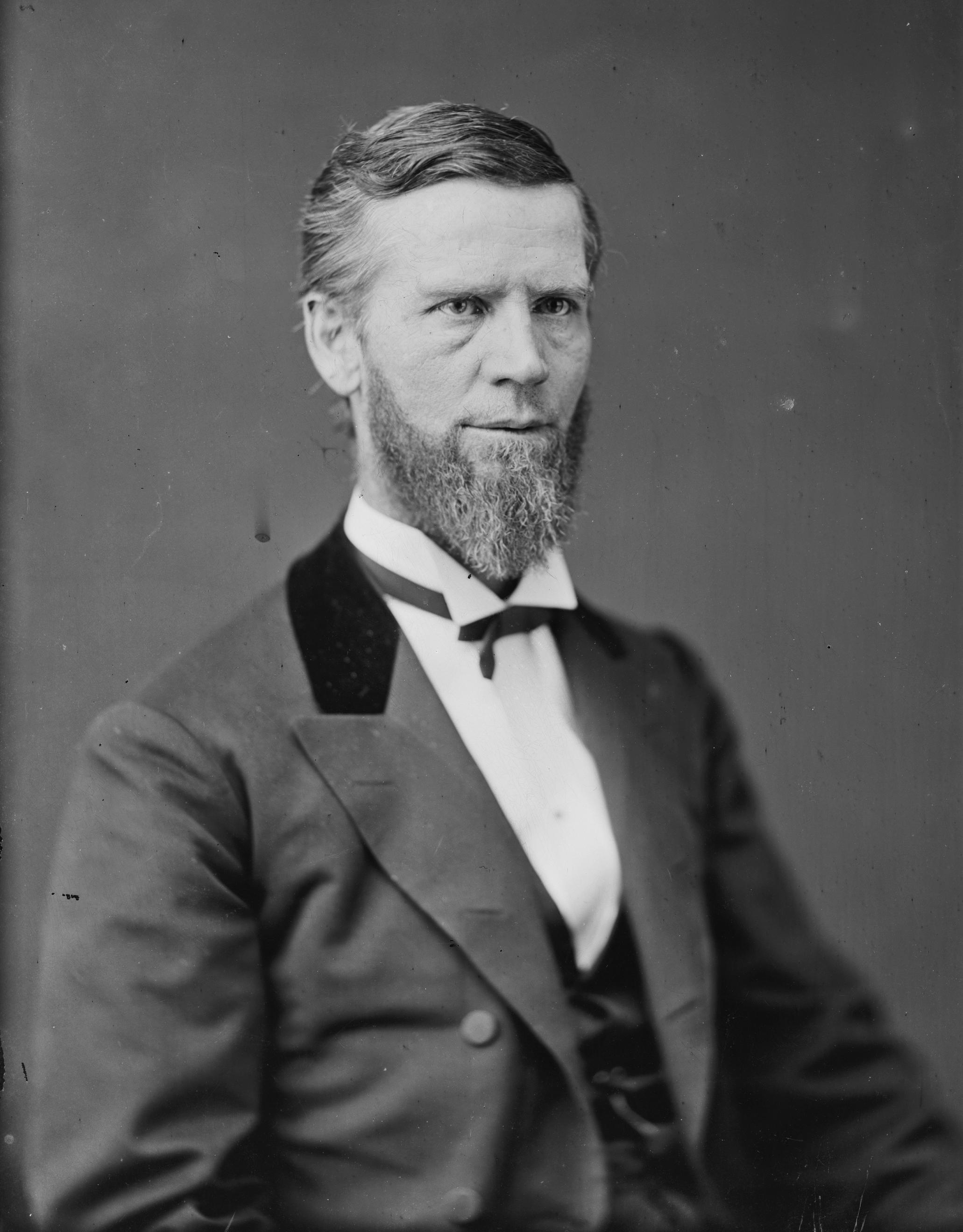
Nominee	J. Donald Cameron	William A. Wallace
Party	Republican	Democratic
Leg. vote	163	69
Percentage	64.94%	27.49%
U.S. senator before election
J. Donald Cameron
Republican
Elected U.S. Senator
J. Donald Cameron
Republican

The 1885 United States Senate election in Pennsylvania was held on January 20, 1885. J. Donald Cameron was re-elected by the Pennsylvania General Assembly to the United States Senate.

== Results ==
The Pennsylvania General Assembly, consisting of the House of Representatives and the Senate, convened on January 20, 1885, to elect a Senator to fill the term beginning on March 4, 1885. Incumbent Republican J. Donald Cameron, who was elected in an 1877 special election and re-elected in 1879, was a successful candidate for re-election to another term. The results of the vote of both houses combined are as follows:

State legislature results
Party	Candidate	Votes	%
Republican	J. Donald Cameron (Inc.)	163	64.94
Democratic	William A. Wallace	69	27.49
Republican	A. W. Acheson	1	0.40
Republican	Charles N. Brumm	1	0.40
Republican	George Shiras Jr.	1	0.40
N/A	Not voting	14	5.58
Totals		251	100.00%

== See also ==
- 1884–85 United States Senate elections

Preceded by 1879	Pennsylvania U.S. Senate election (Class III); 1885	Succeeded by 1891
