= 1878–79 United States Senate elections =

- Dates vary by state (And other dates for special elections)
- Class 3

26 of the 76 seats in the United States Senate (with special elections) 39 seats needed for a majority
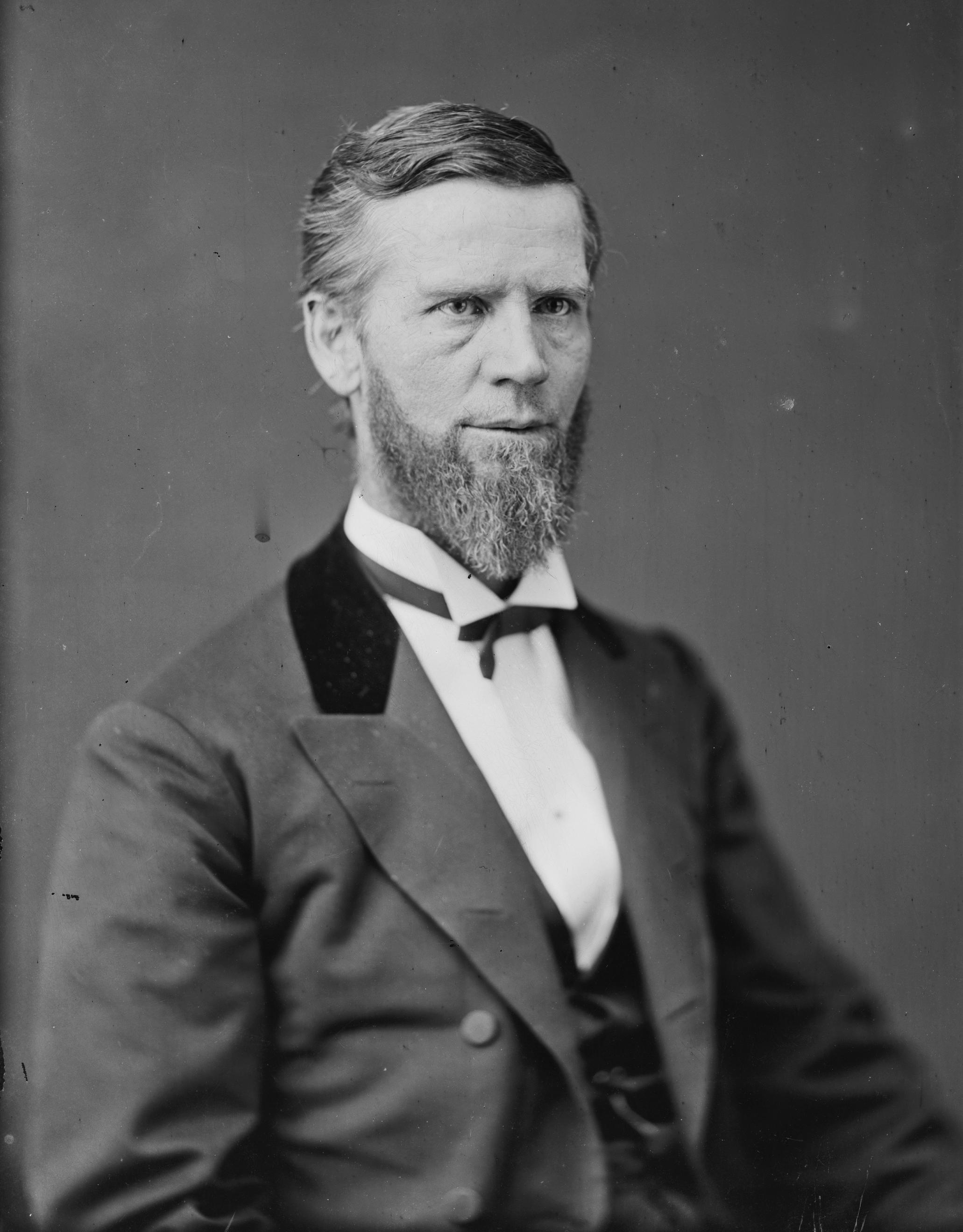

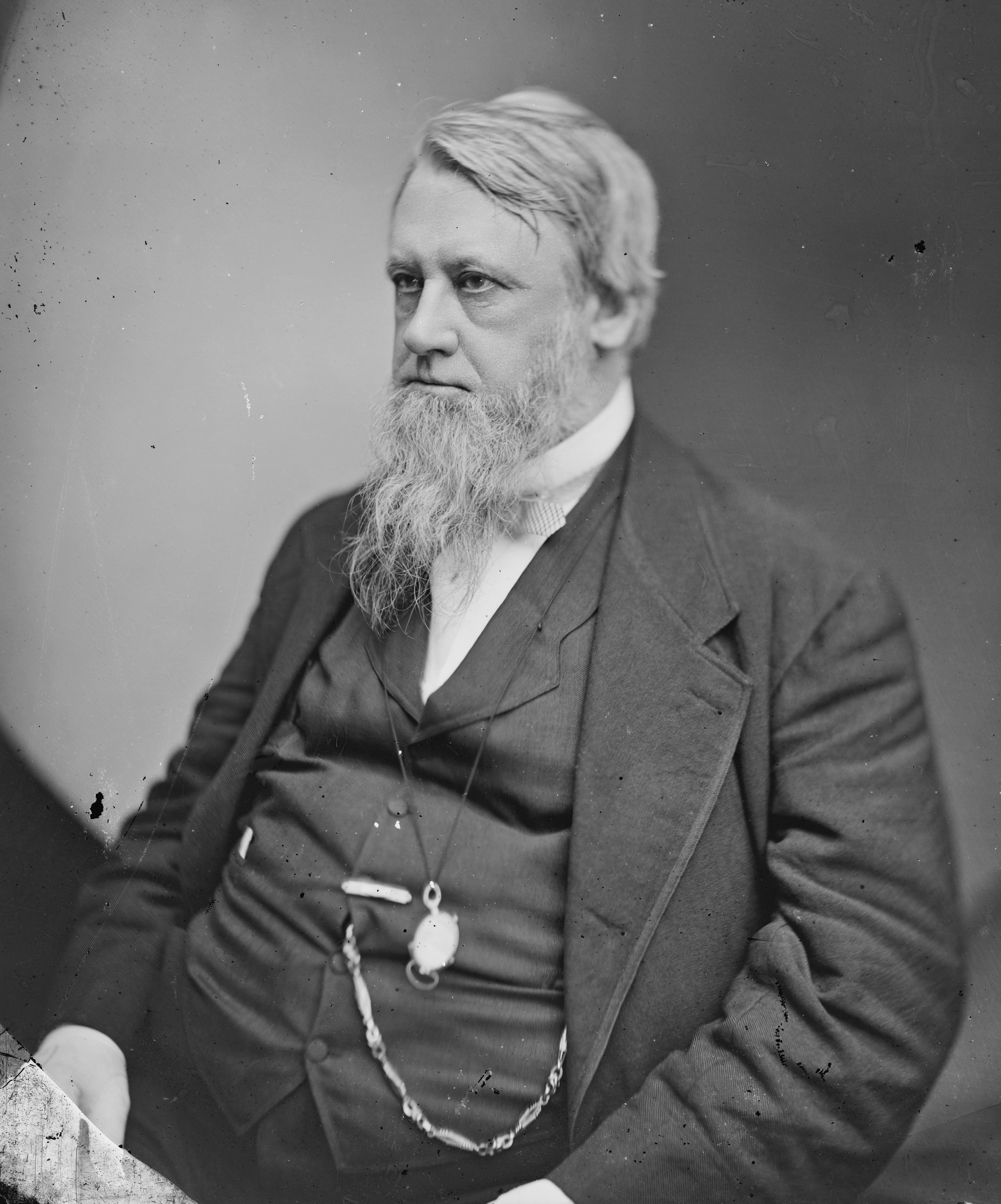
	Majority party	Minority party
Leader	William A. Wallace (Note: as Democratic Caucus Chair)	Henry B. Anthony (Note: as Republican Conference Chair)
Party	Democratic	Republican
Leader since	March 4, 1877	March 4, 1863
Leader's seat	Pennsylvania	Rhode Island
Seats before	36	38
Seats won	14	10
Seats after	42	31
Seat change	▲6	▼7
Seats up	8	17
	Third party	Fourth party
Party	Anti-Monopoly	Independent
Seats before	1	1
Seats won	0	0
Seats after	1	1
Seat change	Steady	Steady
Seats up	0	0
- Results of the elections: Democratic gain Democratic hold Republican gain Republican hold Legislature failed to elect
Majority Party before election
Republican
Elected Majority Party
Democratic

The 1878–79 United States Senate elections were held on various dates in various states. As these U.S. Senate elections were prior to the ratification of the Seventeenth Amendment in 1913, senators were chosen by state legislatures. Senators were elected over a wide range of time throughout 1878 and 1879, and a seat may have been filled months late or remained vacant due to legislative deadlock. In these elections, terms were up for the senators in Class 3.

The Democratic Party recaptured control of the Senate for the first time since before the Civil War.

== Results summary ==
Senate party division, 46th Congress (1879–1881)

- Majority party: Democratic (42)
- Minority party: Republican (31)
- Other parties: Independent (1), Anti-Monopoly (1)
- Total seats: 76

== Change in composition ==
=== Before the elections ===
D_{8}	D_{7}	D_{6}	D_{5}	D_{4}	D_{3}	D_{2}	D_{1}		
D_{9}	D_{10}	D_{11}	D_{12}	D_{13}	D_{14}	D_{15}	D_{16}	D_{17}	D_{18}
D_{28}	D_{27}	D_{26}	D_{25}	D_{24}	D_{23}	D_{22}	D_{21}	D_{20}	D_{19}
D_{29} Ran	D_{30} Ran	D_{31} Ran	D_{32} Ran	D_{33} Unknown	D_{34} Unknown	D_{35} Retired	D_{36} Retired	AM_{1}	I_{1}
Plurality →									R_{38} Retired
R_{29} Unknown	R_{30} Unknown	R_{31} Retired	R_{32} Retired	R_{33} Retired	R_{34} Retired	R_{35} Retired	R_{36} Retired	R_{37} Retired	R_{38} Retired
R_{28} Ran	R_{27} Ran	R_{26} Ran	R_{25} Ran	R_{24} Ran	R_{23} Ran	R_{22} Ran	R_{21}	R_{20}	R_{19}
R_{9}	R_{10}	R_{11}	R_{12}	R_{13}	R_{14}	R_{15}	R_{16}	R_{17}	R_{18}
R_{8}	R_{7}	R_{6}	R_{5}	R_{4}	R_{3}	R_{2}	R_{1}		

=== After the elections ===
D_{8}	D_{7}	D_{6}	D_{5}	D_{4}	D_{3}	D_{2}	D_{1}		
D_{9}	D_{10}	D_{11}	D_{12}	D_{13}	D_{14}	D_{15}	D_{16}	D_{17}	D_{18}
D_{28}	D_{27}	D_{26}	D_{25}	D_{24}	D_{23}	D_{22}	D_{21}	D_{20}	D_{19}
D_{29} Re-elected	D_{30} Re-elected	D_{31} Hold	D_{32} Hold	D_{33} Hold	D_{34} Hold	D_{35} Hold	D_{36} Gain	D_{37} Gain	D_{38} Gain
Majority →									D_{39} Gain
R_{29} Hold	R_{30} Hold	R_{31} Gain	V_{1} R loss	AM_{1}	I_{1}	D_{42} Gain	D_{41} Gain	D_{40} Gain	D_{39} Gain
R_{28} Hold	R_{27} Re-elected	R_{26} Re-elected	R_{25} Re-elected	R_{24} Re-elected	R_{23} Re-elected	R_{22} Re-elected	R_{21}	R_{20}	R_{19}
R_{9}	R_{10}	R_{11}	R_{12}	R_{13}	R_{14}	R_{15}	R_{16}	R_{17}	R_{18}
R_{8}	R_{7}	R_{6}	R_{5}	R_{4}	R_{3}	R_{2}	R_{1}		

Key

AM_{#}	Anti-Monopoly Party
D_{#}	Democratic
I_{#}	Independent
R_{#}	Republican
V_{#}	Vacant

== Race summaries ==
=== Special elections during the 45th Congress ===
In these elections, the winners were seated in 1879 before March 4; ordered by election date.

State	Incumbent			Results	Candidates
State	Senator	Party	Electoral history	Results	Candidates
Missouri (Class 3)	David H. Armstrong	Democratic	1877 (appointed)	Interim appointee retired when successor elected. New senator elected January 27, 1879. Democratic hold. Winner did not run for the next term; see below.	▌ ✓ James Shields (Democratic); [data missing]
Indiana (Class 3)	Daniel W. Voorhees	Democratic	1877 (appointed)	Interim appointee elected January 31, 1879. Winner was also elected to the next term; see below.	▌ ✓ Daniel W. Voorhees (Democratic); [data missing]
Michigan (Class 1)	Isaac P. Christiancy	Republican	1874	Incumbent resigned February 10, 1879, due to ill health. New senator elected February 22, 1879. Republican hold.	▌ ✓ Zachariah Chandler (Republican); [data missing]

=== Races leading to the 46th Congress ===
In these regular elections, the winners were elected for the term beginning March 4, 1885; ordered by state.

All of the elections involved the Class 3 seats.

State	Incumbent			Results	Candidates
State	Senator	Party	Electoral history	Results	Candidates
Alabama	George E. Spencer	Republican	1868 (special); 1872	Incumbent retired. New senator elected in August 1878. Democratic gain.	▌ ✓ George S. Houston (Democratic); [data missing]
Arkansas	Stephen W. Dorsey	Republican	1872–73	Incumbent retired. New senator elected in 1878. Democratic gain.	▌ ✓ James D. Walker (Democratic); [data missing]
California	Aaron A. Sargent	Republican	1872–73	Incumbent retired. New senator elected in 1878. Democratic gain.	▌ ✓ James T. Farley (Democratic) 28; ▌Morris Estee (Republican) 12
Colorado	Jerome B. Chaffee	Republican	1876	Incumbent retired. New senator elected in 1879. Republican hold.	▌ ✓ Nathaniel P. Hill (Republican); [data missing]
Connecticut	William Barnum	Democratic	1876 (special)	Incumbent retired or lost re-election. New senator elected in 1879. Republican gain.	▌ ✓ Orville H. Platt (Republican); [data missing]
Florida	Simon B. Conover	Republican	1872–73	Incumbent retired. New senator elected January 21, 1879. Democratic gain.	▌ ✓ Wilkinson Call (Democratic); [data missing]
Georgia	John B. Gordon	Democratic	1873	Incumbent re-elected in 1879.	▌ ✓ John B. Gordon (Democratic); [data missing]
Illinois	Richard J. Oglesby	Republican	1873	Incumbent retired. New senator elected Jan 22, 1879. Republican hold.	▌ ✓ John A. Logan (Republican) 51.46%; ▌John C. Black (Democratic) 41.75%; ▌Alexander Campbell (Greenback) 4.85%; ▌John McAuliffe (Independent) 1.94%
Indiana	Daniel W. Voorhees	Democratic	1877 (appointed); 1879 (special)	Incumbent re-elected in 1879.	▌ ✓ Daniel W. Voorhees (Democratic); [data missing]
Iowa	William B. Allison	Republican	1872	Incumbent re-elected January 23, 1878.	▌ ✓ William B. Allison (Republican) 104; ▌Daniel F. Miller (Republican) 35; ▌E. N. Gates (Unknown) 3
Kansas	John J. Ingalls	Republican	1873	Incumbent re-elected in 1879.	▌ ✓ John J. Ingalls (Republican); [data missing]
Kentucky	Thomas C. McCreery	Democratic	1871	Incumbent retired. New senator elected January 17, 1878. Democratic hold.	▌ ✓ John Stuart Williams (Democratic) 126; ▌ Robert Boyd (Republican) 11
Louisiana	James B. Eustis	Democratic	1876 (special)	Incumbent lost re-election. New senator elected in 1879. Democratic hold.	▌ ✓ Benjamin F. Jonas (Democratic); [data missing]
Maryland	George R. Dennis	Democratic	1872–73	Incumbent retired. New senator elected January 19, 1878. Democratic hold.	▌ ✓ James Black Groome (Democratic) 78.5%; ▌Lewis H. Steiner (Republican) 18.28%; ▌John M. Robinson (Democratic) 2.15%; ▌James A. Garey (Unknown) 1.08%
Missouri	James Shields	Democratic	1849 (Ill.); 1849 (Ill.–election voided); 1849 (Ill.–special); 1855 (Ill.–lost); 1858 (Minn.); 1859 (Minn.–lost); 1879 (Mo.–special)	Incumbent retired. New senator elected in 1879. Democratic hold.	▌ ✓ George G. Vest (Democratic); [data missing]
Nevada	John P. Jones	Republican	1873	Incumbent re-elected in 1879.	▌ ✓ John P. Jones (Republican); [data missing]
New Hampshire	Bainbridge Wadleigh	Republican	1872	Incumbent retired or lost re-election. Legislature failed to elect. Republican loss.	[data missing]
New York	Roscoe Conkling	Republican	1867; 1873	Incumbent re-elected January 22, 1879.	▌ ✓ Roscoe Conkling (Republican); ▌William Dorsheimer (Democratic); ▌Peter Cooper (Greenback)
North Carolina	Augustus Merrimon	Democratic	1872	Incumbent lost re-election. New senator elected in 1879. Democratic hold.	▌ ✓ Zebulon Vance (Democratic); ▌Augustus Merrimon (Democratic)
Ohio	Stanley Matthews	Republican	1877 (special)	Incumbent retired. New senator elected in 1878 or 1879. Democratic gain.	▌ ✓ George H. Pendleton (Democratic); [data missing]
Oregon	John H. Mitchell	Republican	1872	Incumbent retired. New senator elected in 1878 or 1879. Democratic gain.	▌ ✓ James H. Slater (Democratic); ▌John H. Mitchell (Republican); [data missing]
Pennsylvania	J. Donald Cameron	Republican	1877 (special)	Incumbent re-elected January 20, 1879.	▌ ✓ J. Donald Cameron (Republican) 53.78%; ▌Hiester Clymer (Democratic) 36.65%; ▌Daniel Agnew (Greenback) 6.37%; ▌Edward McPherson (Republican) 1.20%; ▌Russell Thayer (Republican) 0.40%; ▌Galusha A. Grow (Republican) 0.40%
South Carolina	John J. Patterson	Republican	1872–73	Incumbent retired or lost re-election. New senator elected in 1878. Democratic gain.	▌ ✓ Wade Hampton III (Democratic); [data missing]
Vermont	Justin S. Morrill	Republican	1866; 1872	Incumbent re-elected in 1878.	▌ ✓ Justin S. Morrill (Republican); [data missing]
Wisconsin	Timothy O. Howe	Republican	1861; 1866; 1872	Incumbent lost re-nomination. New senator elected January 22, 1879. Republican hold.	▌ ✓ Matthew H. Carpenter (Republican) 67.20%; ▌Edward George Ryan (Democratic) 22.40%; ▌Gabriel Bouck (Democratic) 10.40%

=== Elections during the 46th Congress ===
In this election, the winner was elected in 1879 after March 4.

State	Incumbent			Results	Candidates
State	Senator	Party	Electoral history	Results	Candidates
New Hampshire (Class 3)	Charles H. Bell	Republican	1879 (appointed)	Legislature had failed to elect; see above. Interim appointee retired when successor elected. New senator elected June 17, 1879. Republican hold.	▌ ✓ Henry W. Blair (Republican); [data missing]

== Maryland ==
1878 United States Senate election in Maryland
- January 19, 1878

80 members of the Maryland General Assembly
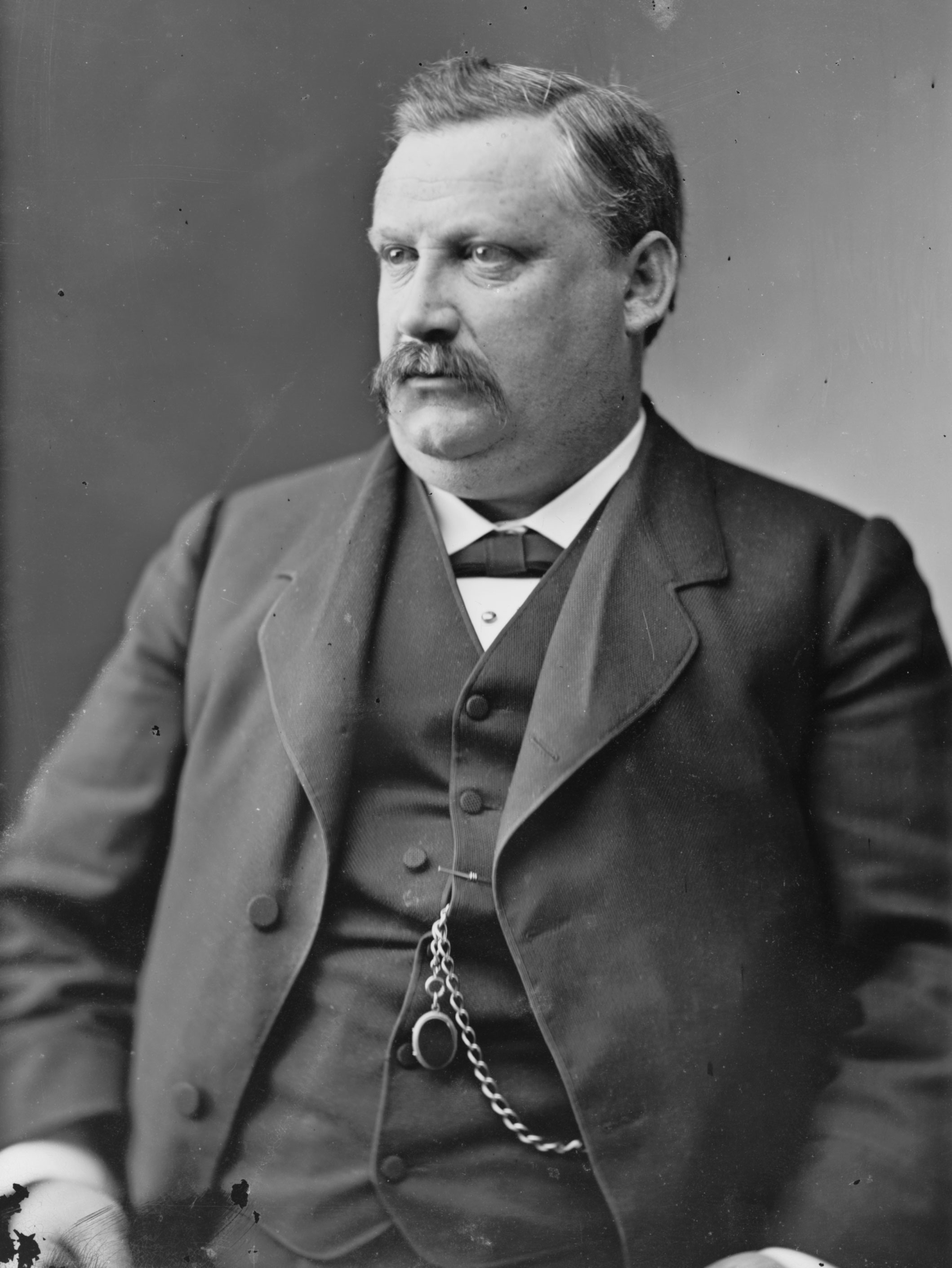

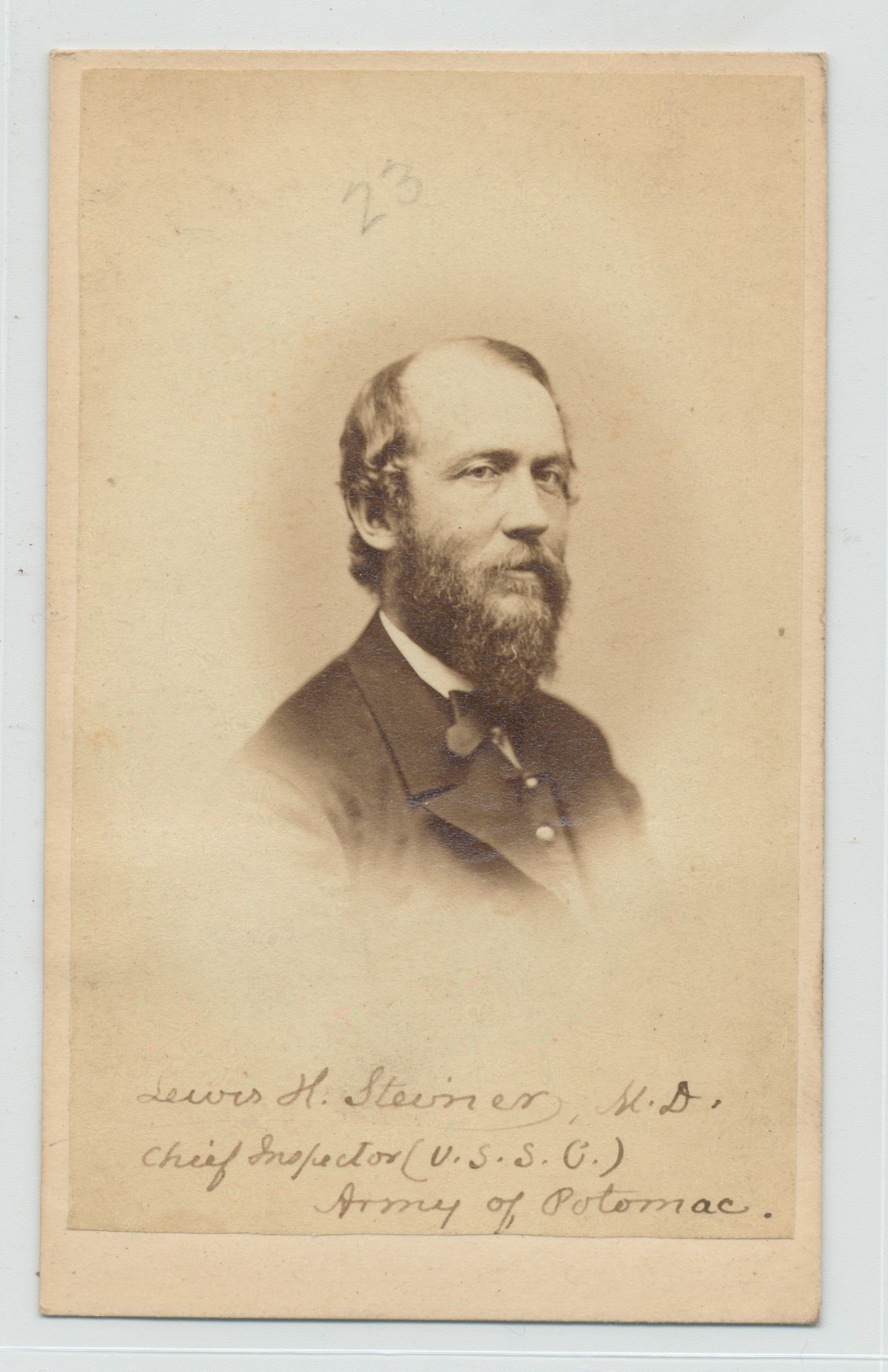
Candidate	James Black Groome	Lewis Henry Steiner
Party	Democratic	Republican
Legislative vote	73	17
Percentage	78.50%	18.28%

James Black Groome was elected by a margin of 60.22%, or 56 votes, for the Class 3 seat.

== New York ==
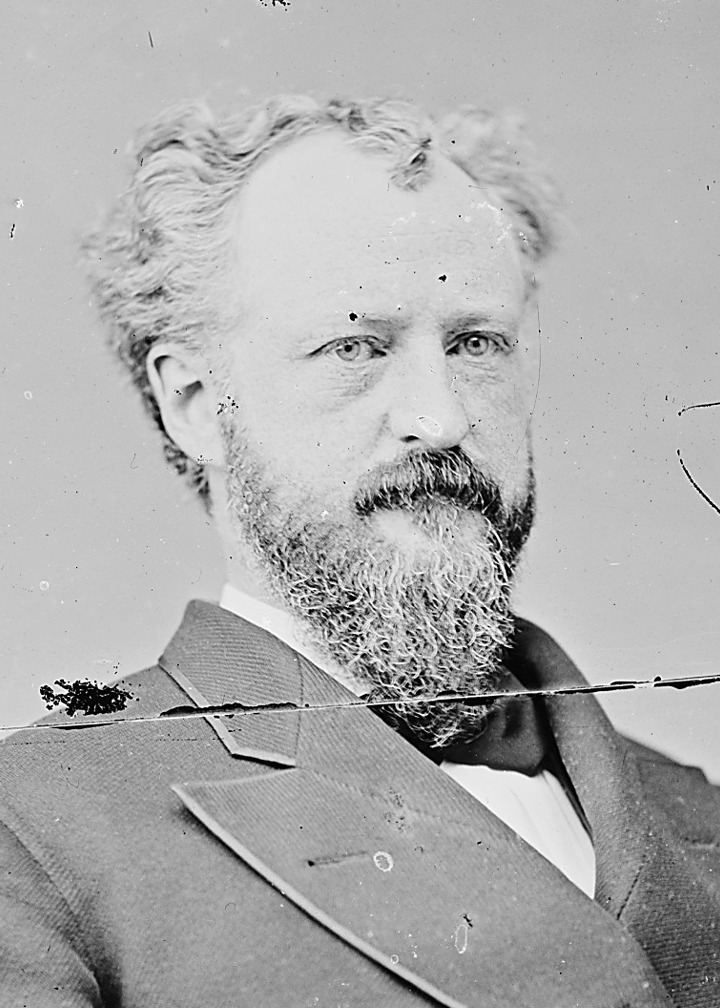
Senator Roscoe Conkling

In New York, the election was held on January 21, 1879, by the New York State Legislature. Republican Roscoe Conkling had been re-elected in January 1873 to this seat, and his term would expire on March 3, 1879. At the State election in November 1877, 19 Republicans and 13 Democrats were elected for a two-year term (1878–1879) in the State Senate. At the State election in November 1878, 97 Republicans, 28 Democrats and 3 Greenbackers were elected for the session of 1879 to the Assembly, and Republican Thomas Murphy was elected to fill the vacancy in the State Senate caused by the death of Democrat John Morrissey. The 102nd New York State Legislature met from January 7 to May 22, 1879, at Albany, New York.

The caucus of Republican State legislators met on January 20, Temporary President of the State Senate William H. Robertson presided. Present were all Republican legislators except State Senator Louis S. Goebel (6th D.) and Assemblyman James W. Wadsworth. They re-nominated the incumbent U.S. Senator Conkling unanimously. The caucus of the Democratic State legislators met also on January 20. State Senator Thomas C. E. Ecclesine (8th D.) offered to adopt a prostest against the senatorial election proceedings, claiming that the senatorial and assembly districts were incorrectly apportioned and thus the State Legislature did not represent the wish of the people of the State. The protest was substituted by a resolution to appoint a committee which would elaborate an address on the apportionment at a later date. Ecclesine then marched out, and the remaining legislators nominated Lieutenant Governor William Dorsheimer for the U.S. Senate.

1879 Democratic caucus for United States Senator result
Candidate	First ballot	Second ballot
William Dorsheimer	11	18
James F. Starbuck	8	8
DeWitt C. West	8	6
Elijah Ward	2	

The two Greenback assemblymen John Banfield (Chemung Co.) and George E. Williams (Oswego Co.) voted for 87-year-old Peter Cooper, a New York City inventor, industrialist and philanthropist who had run for U.S. president in 1876 on the Greenback ticket.

Roscoe Conkling was the choice of both the Assembly and the State Senate, and was declared elected.

1879 United States Senator election result
	Republican		Democrat		Greenback	
State Senate (32 members)	Roscoe Conkling	20	William Dorsheimer	12		
State Assembly (128 members)	Roscoe Conkling	95	William Dorsheimer	23	Peter Cooper	2

Note: The votes were cast on January 21, but both Houses met in a joint session on January 22 to compare nominations, and declare the result.

== Pennsylvania ==
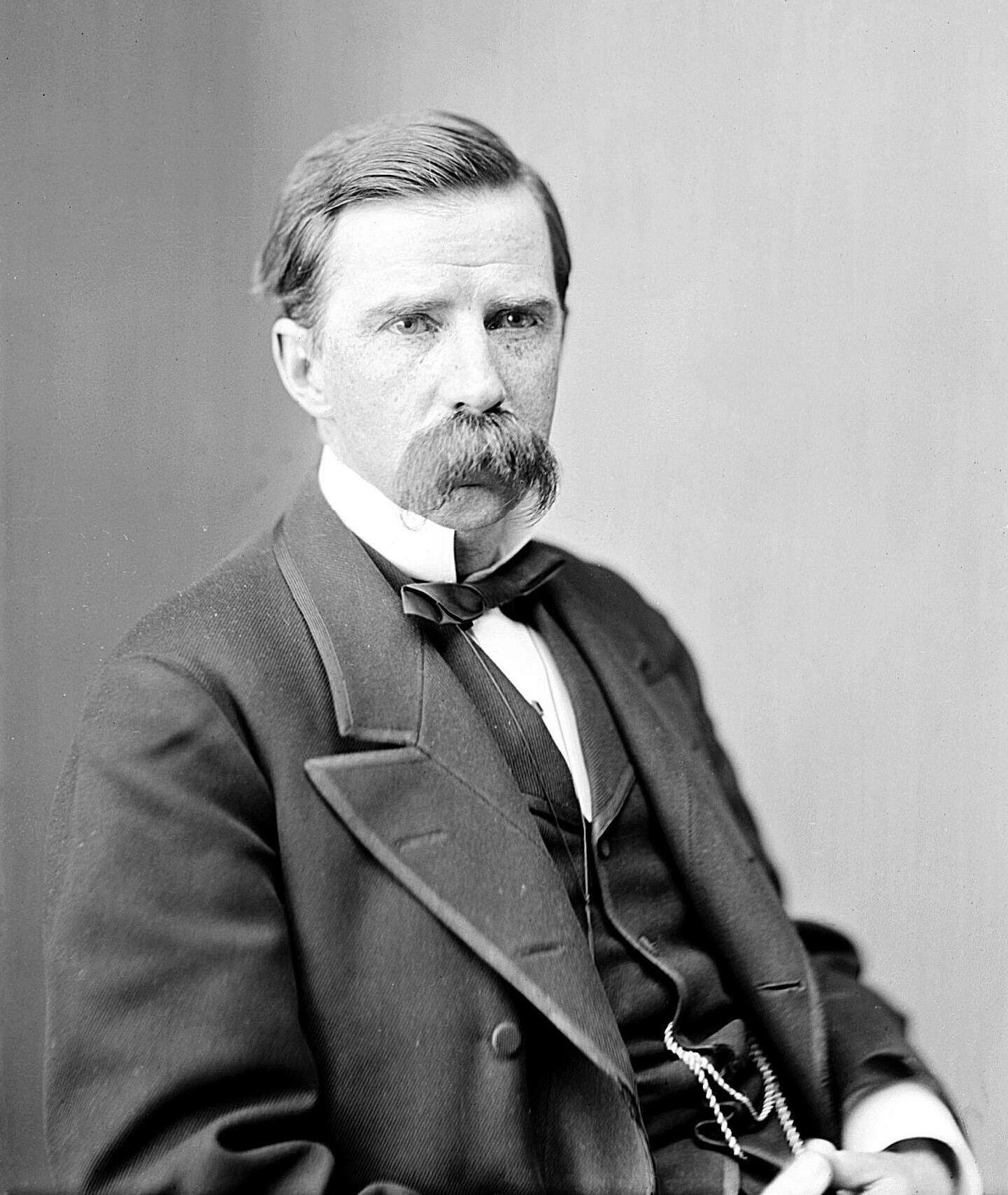
Senator J. Donald Cameron

In Pennsylvania, the election was held January 20, 1879. J. Donald Cameron was re-elected by the Pennsylvania General Assembly to the United States Senate.

After Sen. Simon Cameron resigned from office, his son J. Donald Cameron was elected by the General Assembly, consisting of the House of Representatives and the Senate, in 1877 to serve the remainder of the unexpired term, which was to expire on March 4, 1879. The Pennsylvania General Assembly convened on January 20, 1879, to elect a Senator to serve the term beginning on March 4, 1879. The results of the vote of both houses combined are as follows:

State Legislature Results
Party	Candidate	Votes	%
Republican	J. Donald Cameron (Inc.)	135	53.78
Democratic	Hiester Clymer	92	36.65
Greenback	Daniel Agnew	16	6.37
Republican	Edward McPherson	3	1.20
Republican	Russell Thayer	1	0.40
Republican	Galusha A. Grow	1	0.40
N/A	Not voting	3	1.20
Totals		251	100.00%

== See also ==
- 1878 United States elections
  - 1878–79 United States House of Representatives elections
- 45th United States Congress
- 46th United States Congress
