= 1885 United States Senate election in Wisconsin =

- January 28, 1885
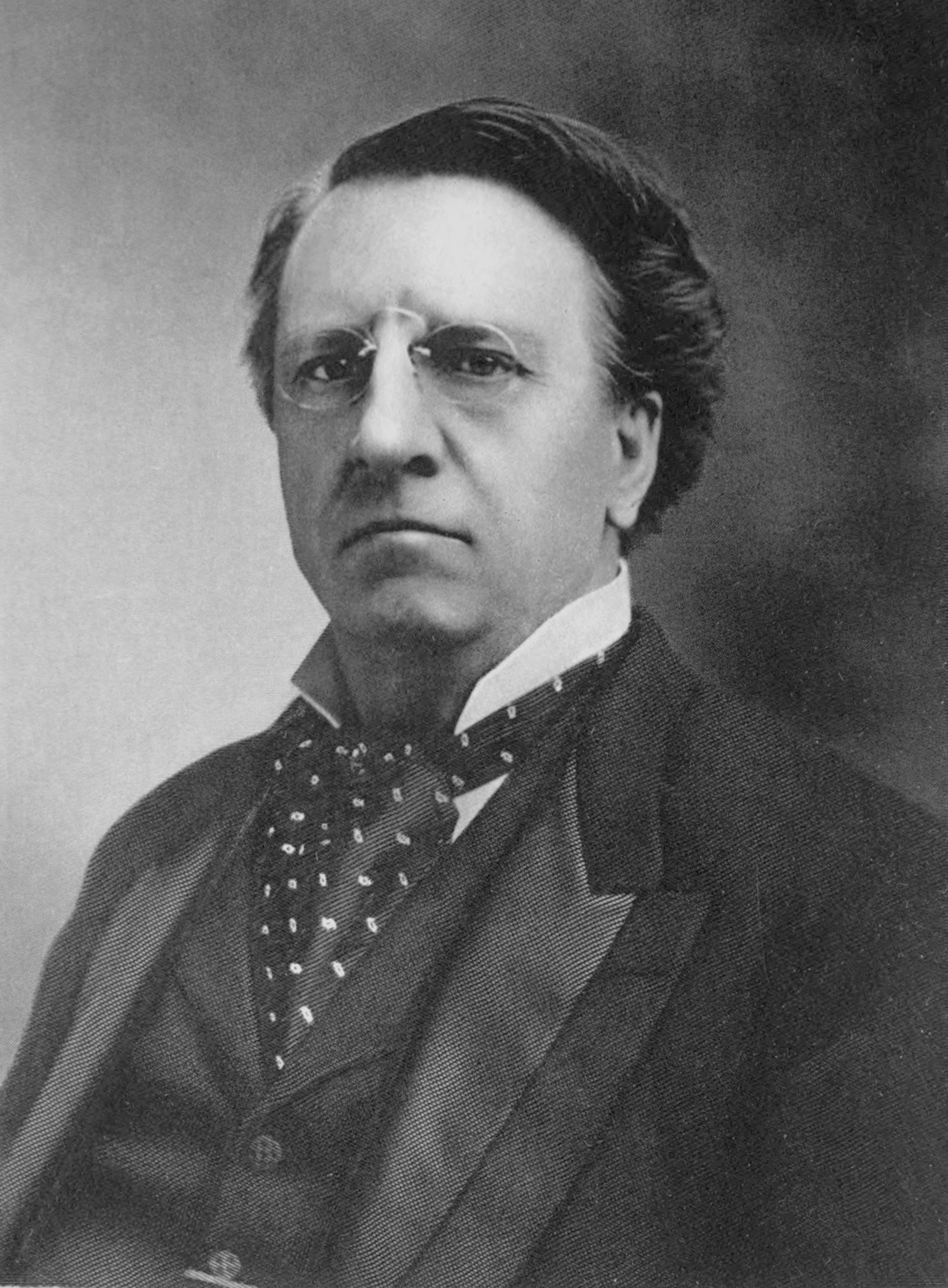

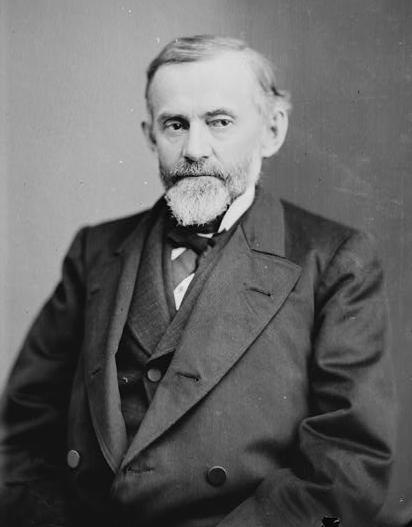
Nominee	John C. Spooner	Edward S. Bragg
Party	Republican	Democratic
Legislative vote	76	48
Percentage	61.29%	38.71%
U.S. senator before election
Angus Cameron
Republican
Elected U.S. Senator
John C. Spooner
Republican

The 1885 United States Senate election in Wisconsin was held in the 37th Wisconsin Legislature on January 28, 1885. Incumbent Republican U.S. senator Angus Cameron did not run for re-election. Republican lawyer John Coit Spooner was elected United States senator on the first ballot.

In the 1885 term, Republicans held significant majorities in both chambers of the Wisconsin Legislature, so had more than enough votes to elect a Republican United States senator.

== Major candidates ==
=== Democratic ===
- Edward S. Bragg, U.S. representative and former Union Army general from Fond du Lac, Wisconsin.

=== Republican ===
- John Coit Spooner, prominent railroad and corporate lawyer from Hudson, Wisconsin.

== Results ==
1st Vote of the 37th Wisconsin Legislature, January 28, 1885
Party	Candidate	Votes	%
Republican	John Coit Spooner	76 (Note: Spooner received the votes of all Republican members except for senators Joseph W. Hoyt and James Franklin Wiley, and representatives John Lagrand, Henry Walvoord, and Marion Wescott (who were all absent).)	61.29%
Democratic	Edward S. Bragg	48 (Note: Bragg received the votes of all Democratic members except for senator William Kennedy, and representatives Leopold Hammel, Andrew Schmidlkofer, and August Schoenwetter (who were all absent).)	38.71%
	Absent or not voting	9	
Majority		63	50.81%
Total votes		124	93.23%
Republican hold			
