= 1879 United States Senate election in Pennsylvania =

1877 United States Senate election in Pennsylvania
- January 20, 1879
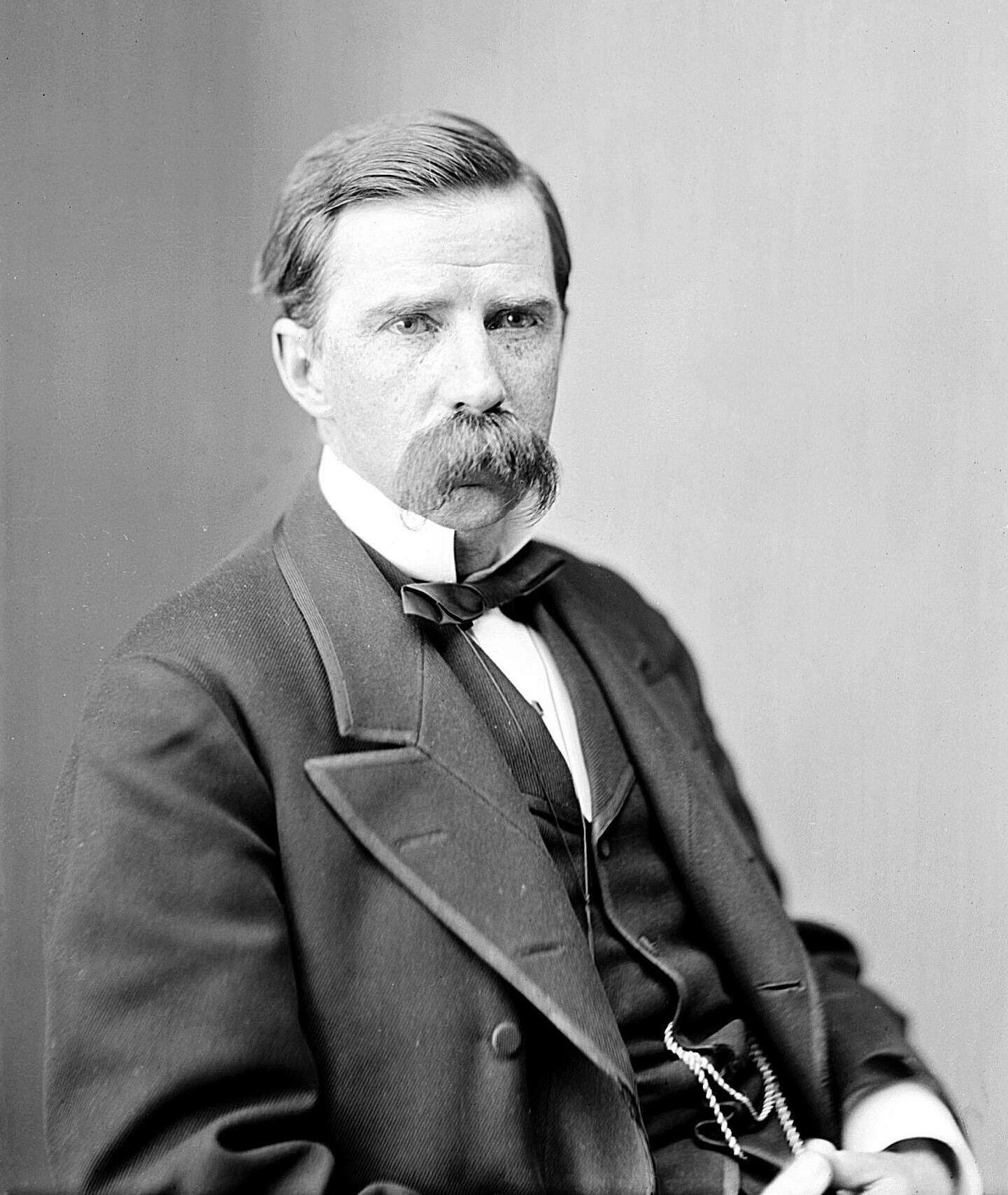

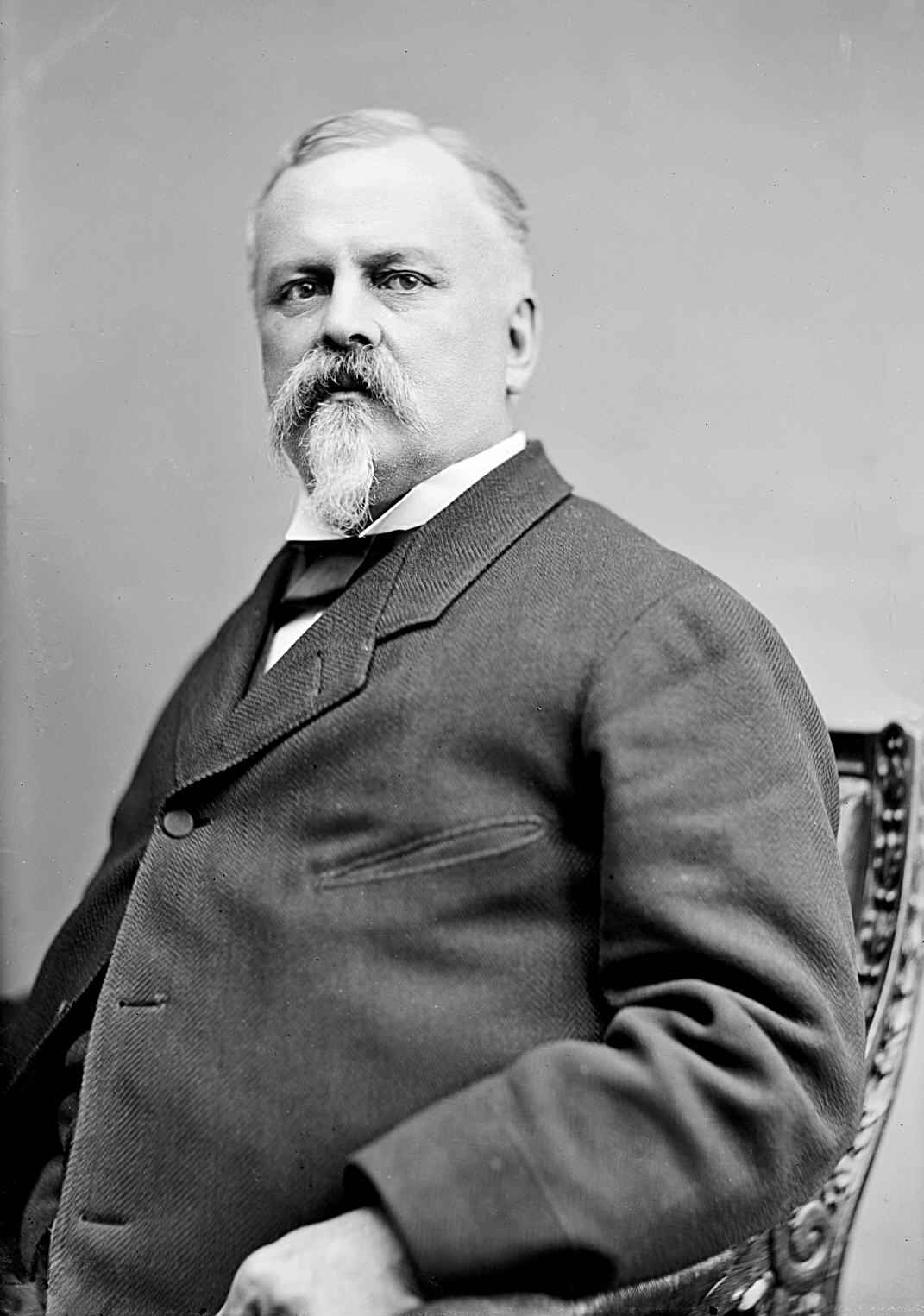

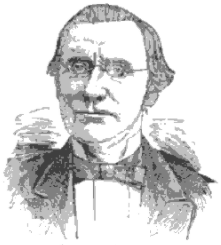
Nominee	J. Donald Cameron	Hiester Clymer	Daniel Agnew
Party	Republican	Democratic	Greenback Party
Leg. vote	135	92	16
Percentage	53.78%	36.65%	6.37%
U.S. senator before election
J. Donald Cameron
Republican
Elected U.S. Senator
J. Donald Cameron
Republican

The 1879 United States Senate election in Pennsylvania was held on January 20, 1879. J. Donald Cameron was re-elected by the Pennsylvania General Assembly to the United States Senate.

== Background ==
After Simon Cameron resigned from office, his son J. Donald Cameron was elected by the General Assembly, consisting of the House of Representatives and the Senate, in 1877 to serve the remainder of the unexpired term, which was to expire on March 4, 1879.

== Results ==
The Pennsylvania General Assembly convened on January 20, 1879, to elect a senator to serve the term beginning on March 4, 1879. The results of the vote of both houses combined are as follows:

State legislature results
Party	Candidate	Votes	%
Republican	J. Donald Cameron (Inc.)	135	53.78
Democratic	Hiester Clymer	92	36.65
Greenback	Daniel Agnew	16	6.37
Republican	Edward McPherson	3	1.20
Republican	Russell Thayer	1	0.40
Republican	Galusha A. Grow	1	0.40
N/A	Not voting	3	1.20
Totals		251	100.00%

== See also ==
- 1878–79 United States Senate elections

Preceded by 1877	Pennsylvania U.S. Senate election (Class III); 1879	Succeeded by 1885
