= 1877 United States Senate special election in Pennsylvania =

1877 United States Senate election in Pennsylvania
- March 20, 1877
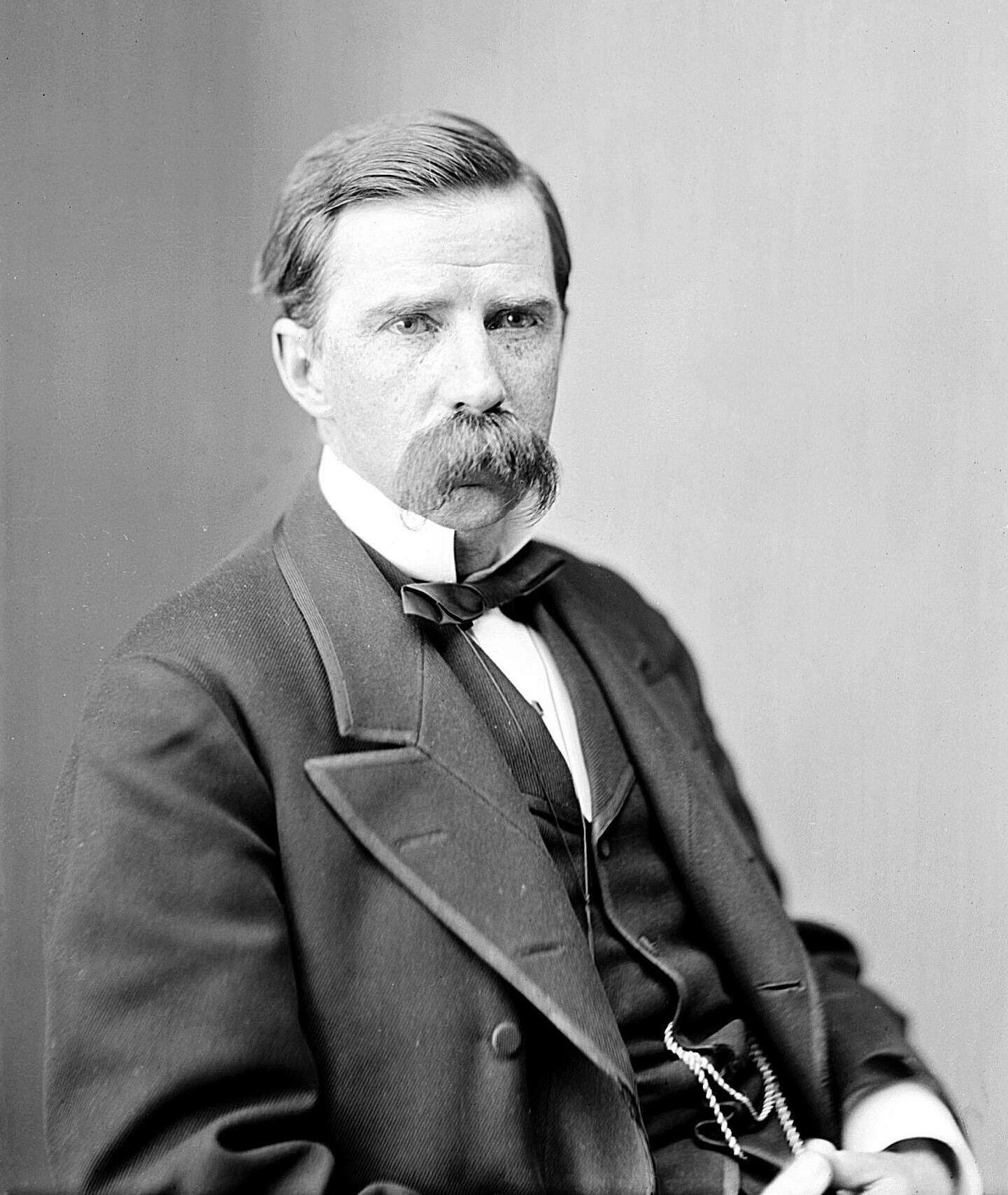

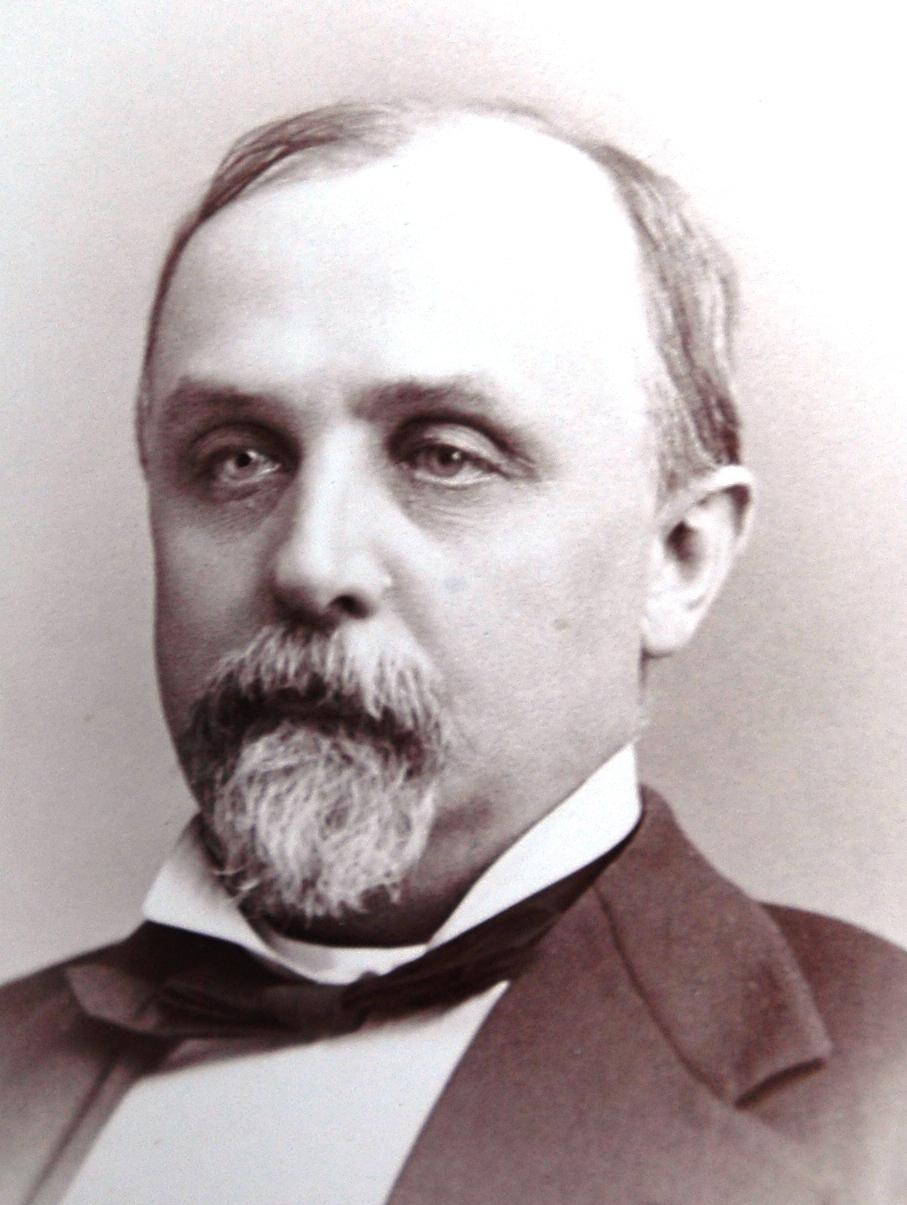
Nominee	J. Donald Cameron	Andrew H. Dill
Party	Republican	Democratic
Leg. vote	147	92
Percentage	61.65%	32.33%
U.S. senator before election
Simon Cameron
Republican
Elected U.S. Senator
Edgar Cowan
Republican

The 1877 United States Senate special election in Pennsylvania was held on March 20, 1877. J. Donald Cameron was elected by the Pennsylvania General Assembly to the United States Senate.

== Background ==
Republican Simon Cameron was elected to the United States Senate by the Pennsylvania General Assembly, consisting of the House of Representatives and the Senate, in 1867 and was re-elected in 1873. Sen. Cameron resigned on March 12, 1877.

== Results ==
Following the resignation of Sen. Simon Cameron, the Pennsylvania General Assembly convened on March 20, 1877, to elect a new senator to fill the vacancy. Former United States secretary of war J. Donald Cameron, Simon Cameron's son, was elected to complete his father's term, set to expire on March 4, 1879. The results of the vote of both houses combined are as follows:

State legislature results
Party	Candidate	Votes	%
Republican	J. Donald Cameron	147	58.57
Democratic	Andrew H. Dill	92	36.65
Democratic	Hiester Clymer	1	0.40
Democratic	Andrew G. Curtin	1	0.40
Democratic	John Jackson	1	0.40
N/A	Not voting	9	3.59
Totals		251	100.00%

== See also ==
- 1876–77 United States Senate elections

Preceded by 1873	Pennsylvania U.S. Senate election (Class III); 1877	Succeeded by 1879
