= J. Donald Cameron =

American politician (1833–1918)

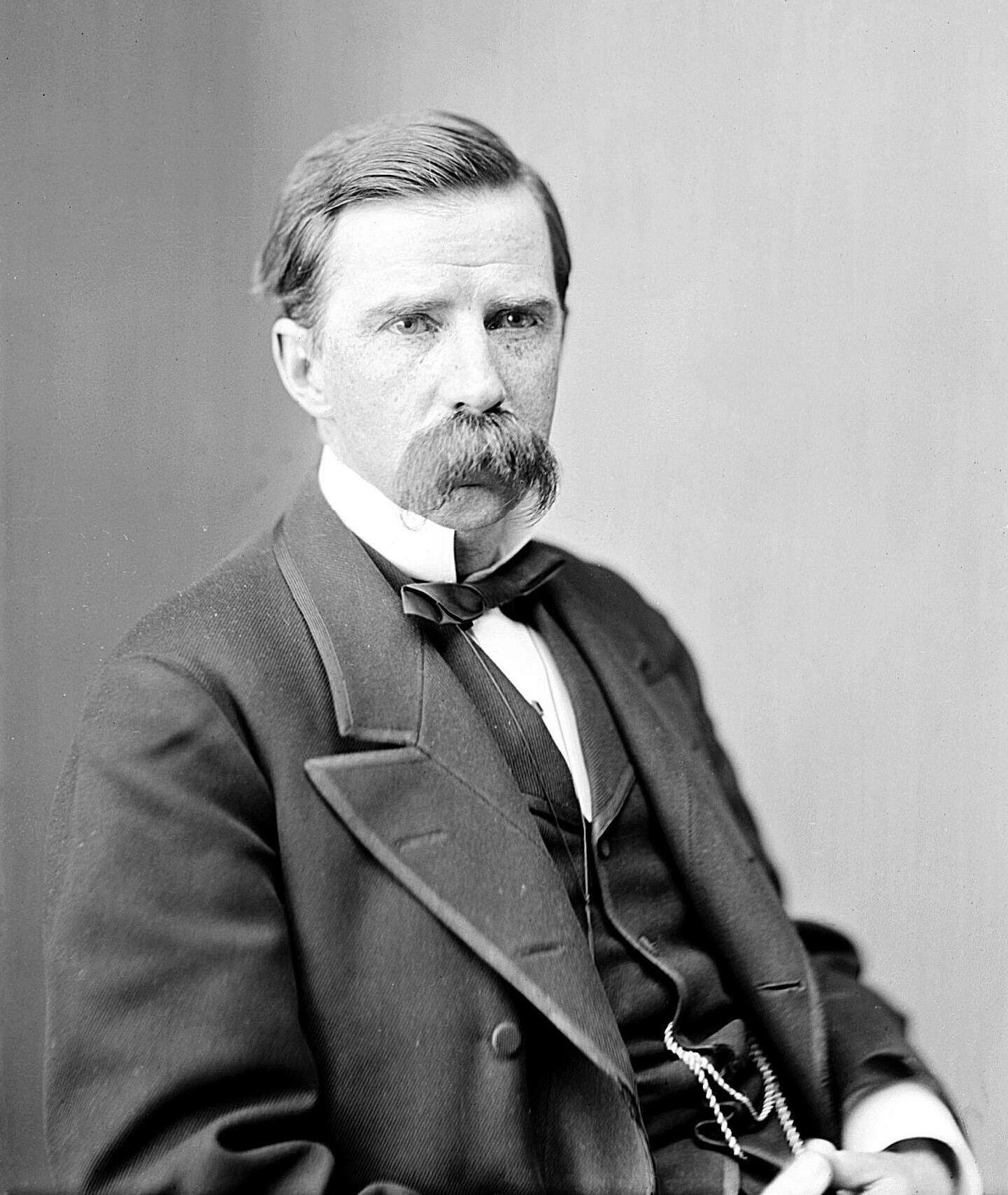
- Cameron c. 1870s

United States Senator from Pennsylvania
- In office March 20, 1877 – March 3, 1897
- Preceded by: Simon Cameron
- Succeeded by: Boies Penrose

Chairman of the Republican National Committee
- In office November 1, 1879 – July 2, 1880; Acting: November 1, 1879 – December 17, 1879
- Preceded by: Zachariah Chandler
- Succeeded by: Marshall Jewell

32nd United States Secretary of War
- In office May 22, 1876 – March 4, 1877
- President: Ulysses S. Grant
- Preceded by: Alphonso Taft
- Succeeded by: George W. McCrary

Personal details
- Born: James Donald Cameron; May 14, 1833 Middletown, Pennsylvania, U.S.
- Died: August 30, 1918 (aged 85) Lancaster County, Pennsylvania, U.S.
- Party: Republican
- Spouse(s): Mary McCormick; Elizabeth Sherman
- Children: 7
- Parents: Simon Cameron (father); Margaret Brua (mother)
- Education: Princeton University (BA, MA)

James Donald Cameron (May 14, 1833 – August 30, 1918) was an American banker, businessman and Republican politician who served as Secretary of War in the cabinet of President Ulysses S. Grant from 1876 to 1877 and represented Pennsylvania in the United States Senate from 1877 to 1897. Cameron succeeded his father, Simon Cameron, in both offices and as boss of the powerful Pennsylvania Republican political machine.

Cameron was raised and educated near Harrisburg, Pennsylvania. After graduating from Princeton College, Cameron worked in the banking and railroad industries.

In May 1876, Cameron was appointed secretary of war as part of a cabinet reshuffle by President Ulysses S. Grant, following the impeachment and resignation of William W. Belknap and a brief tenure by Secretary Alphonso Taft, whom Grant made attorney general. Cameron's father served in the same office under President Abraham Lincoln. (Note: Alphonso Taft and his son William H. Taft are the only other father-son duo to serve as United States secretary of war.) During Cameron's tenure, the military was challenged by the Great Sioux War and by the threat of a second Southern secession after the controversial 1876 election of President Rutherford B. Hayes. Cameron proved to be an energetic administrator and his appointment as secretary of war launched his lengthy political career in the Senate.

After leaving the cabinet, Cameron was elected senator by the Pennsylvania legislature, under the control of Senator Simon Cameron, his father. Cameron served as Pennsylvania's U.S. senator from 1877 to 1897, and as chairman on two powerful Senate committees.

After leaving the Senate, Cameron worked in various industrial businesses until his death in 1918. Cameron was the last surviving cabinet member of the Grant Administration.

== Early life ==
James Donald Cameron was born on May 14, 1833, in Middletown, Pennsylvania, in the family home, the first-born son of Simon Cameron, the 26th Secretary of War under President Abraham Lincoln and a powerful Pennsylvania politician. Cameron's mother was Margaret Brua. Cameron was commonly referred to as "Don." Having received his elementary education in Harrisburg, Cameron enrolled in Princeton College (today Princeton University); he was graduated with a Bachelor of Arts in 1852 and received a Master of Arts degree in 1855.

== Banking and railroad career ==
After leaving Princeton, Cameron's father Simon placed Cameron as a clerk at the successful Middleton Bank; whose main investments were in the iron, coal, and lumber businesses of Pennsylvania. Cameron worked his way up to being cashier and then president of the bank. As an executive of the Northern Central Railway during the American Civil War, Cameron managed the flow of supplies and soldiers from the northeastern states to Washington, D.C., and Virginia, including efforts to keep the railroad open despite Confederate attempt to damage or destroy it. From 1866 to December 1874 Cameron was president of the Northern Central. As bank president, Cameron was able to improve the financial condition of the railroad. After leaving the Railroad, Cameron worked in various industrial enterprises in Pennsylvania.

== Secretary of War ==
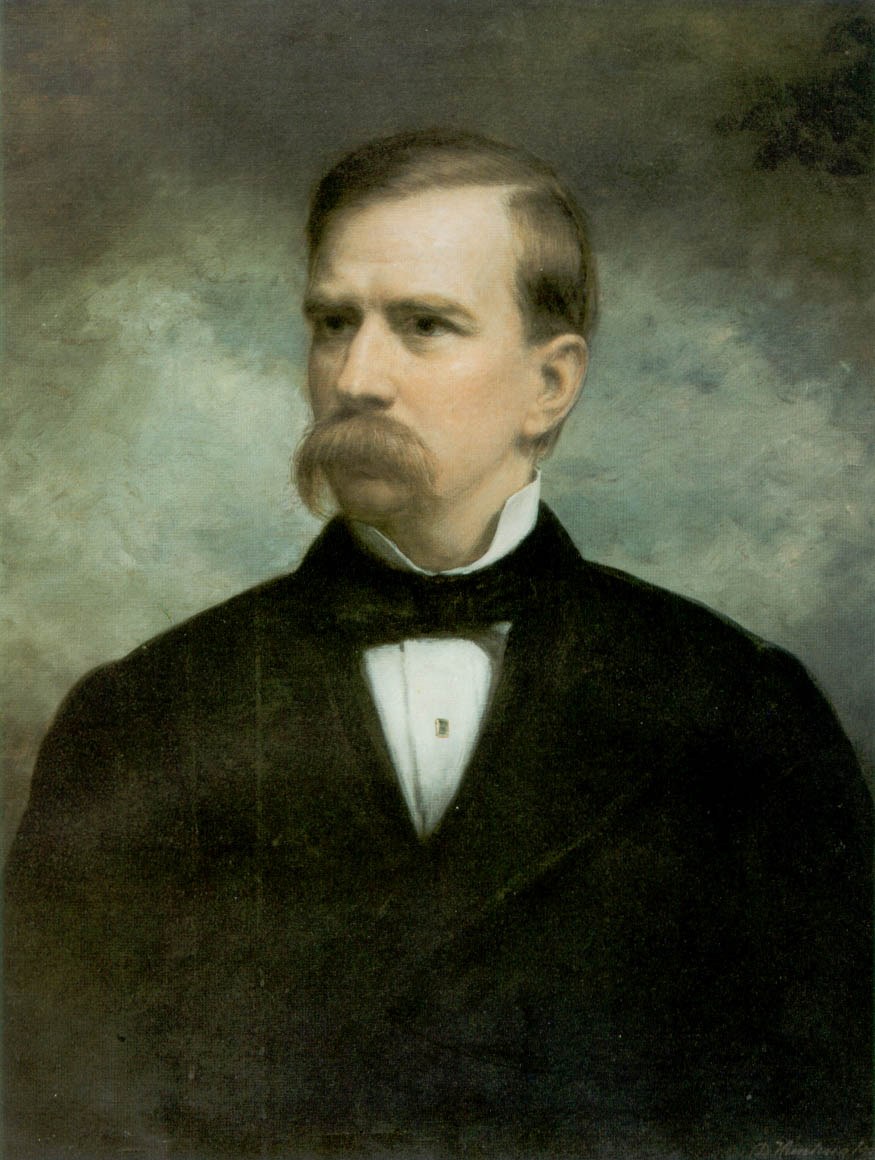
J. Donald Cameron as Secretary of War (Huntington 1877)

In 1876, President Ulysses S. Grant appointed Cameron to his cabinet as Secretary of War, a post his father once served in during the Lincoln administration, to succeed Alphonso Taft, who became attorney general, and served as so until the end of Grant's presidency. Cameron's predecessor, Alphonso Taft, had initially replaced William W. Belknap, who had abruptly resigned over taking profit payments from the Fort Sill tradership. The Secretary of War had been given control over all Indian traderships in 1870. Belknap was impeached by the House, and during the summer of 1876 was tried and acquitted by the Senate. Cameron's appointment as Secretary of War was part of a sensational three move realignment by President Grant. U.S. Attorney General Edwards Pierrepont was appointed Minister to England; Secretary Taft was appointed U.S. Attorney General; and Cameron was appointed Secretary of War, on the advice of his father, Senator Simon Cameron. Cameron had never served political office until appointed Secretary of War. Cameron had to quickly acquaint himself with the War Department that was in the midst of fighting the Great Sioux War. After the controversial 1876 Presidential election, Cameron had to contend with the Southern States who threatened to secede from the United States a second time. According to General of the Army William T. Sherman, the U.S. military during 1876 was as active as it had been since the Civil War.

Secretary Cameron requested legislation from Congress that required war contractors be required to stand by their bids for a definite time period. Secretary Cameron requested funding from Congress through allocations that paid for the War of Rebellion Records, for the preservation Mathew Brady's American Civil War photographs.

The U.S. Military, including the Army, headed by Cameron, and Navy, headed by Secretary George M. Robeson, were also in a technological transition developing submarine technology; and torpedo mines and ships to protect United States' waterways and harbors.

=== Great Sioux War ===
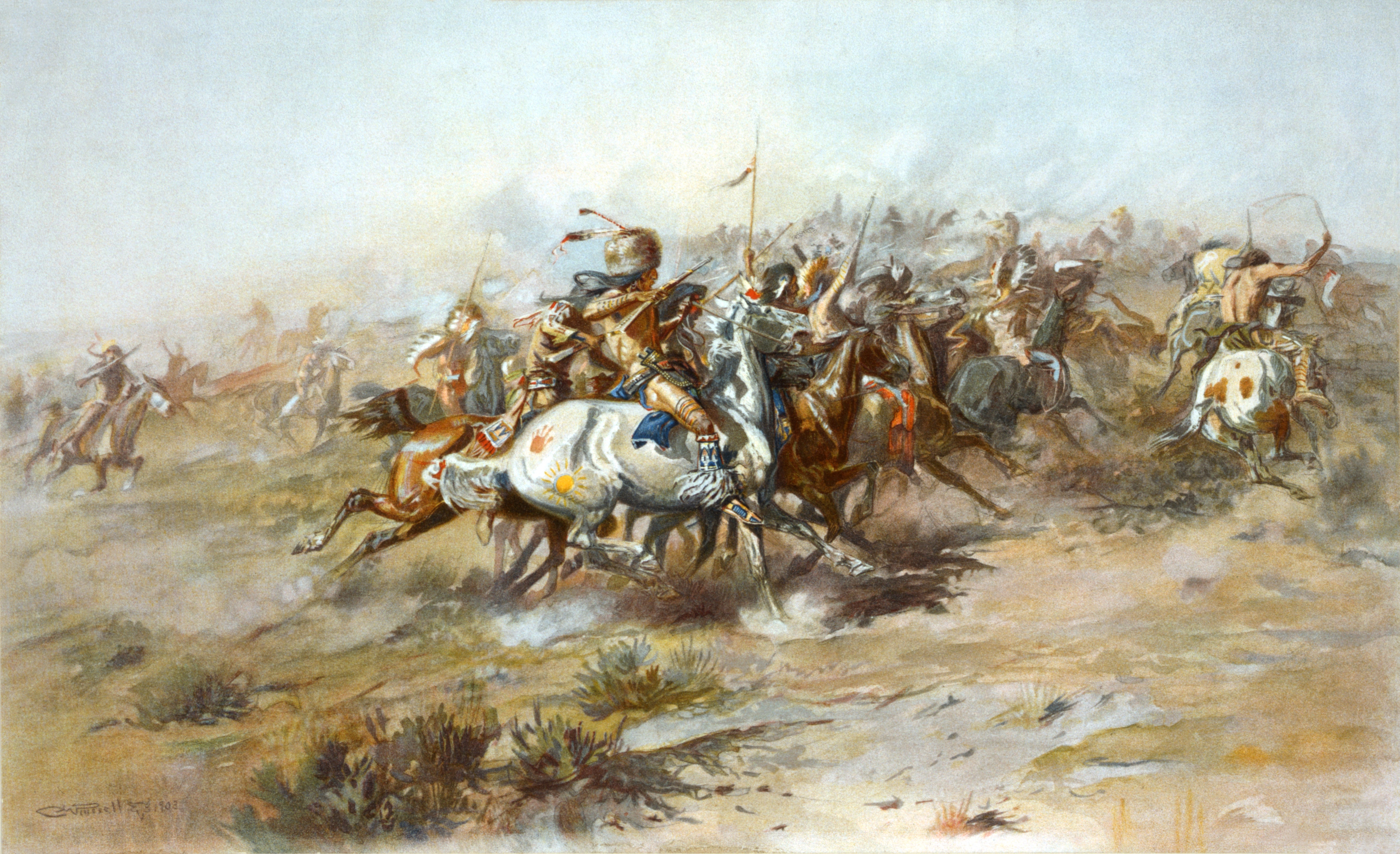
1903 artistic depiction of the Battle of the Little Big Horn

Without ever holding political office, Secretary of War Cameron had to immediately contend with the Great Sioux War and quickly become acquainted with the bureaucracy of the War Department. When gold was discovered in the Black Hills, miners began to invade Indian territory given by the federal government to the Sioux tribe under the Fort Laramie Treaty of 1868. In addition, the federal government planned to put a route of the Northern Pacific Railroad through the Sioux and Cheyenne buffalo hunting grounds. After negotiation for the sale of Sioux land failed in May 1875, President Grant ordered all non-treaty bands to return to the reservation. When Sitting Bull and Crazy Horse refused to comply, Secretary of Interior Zachariah Chandler handed over the jurisdiction of the hostile Indians to the War Department on January 31, 1876, launching the Great Sioux War.

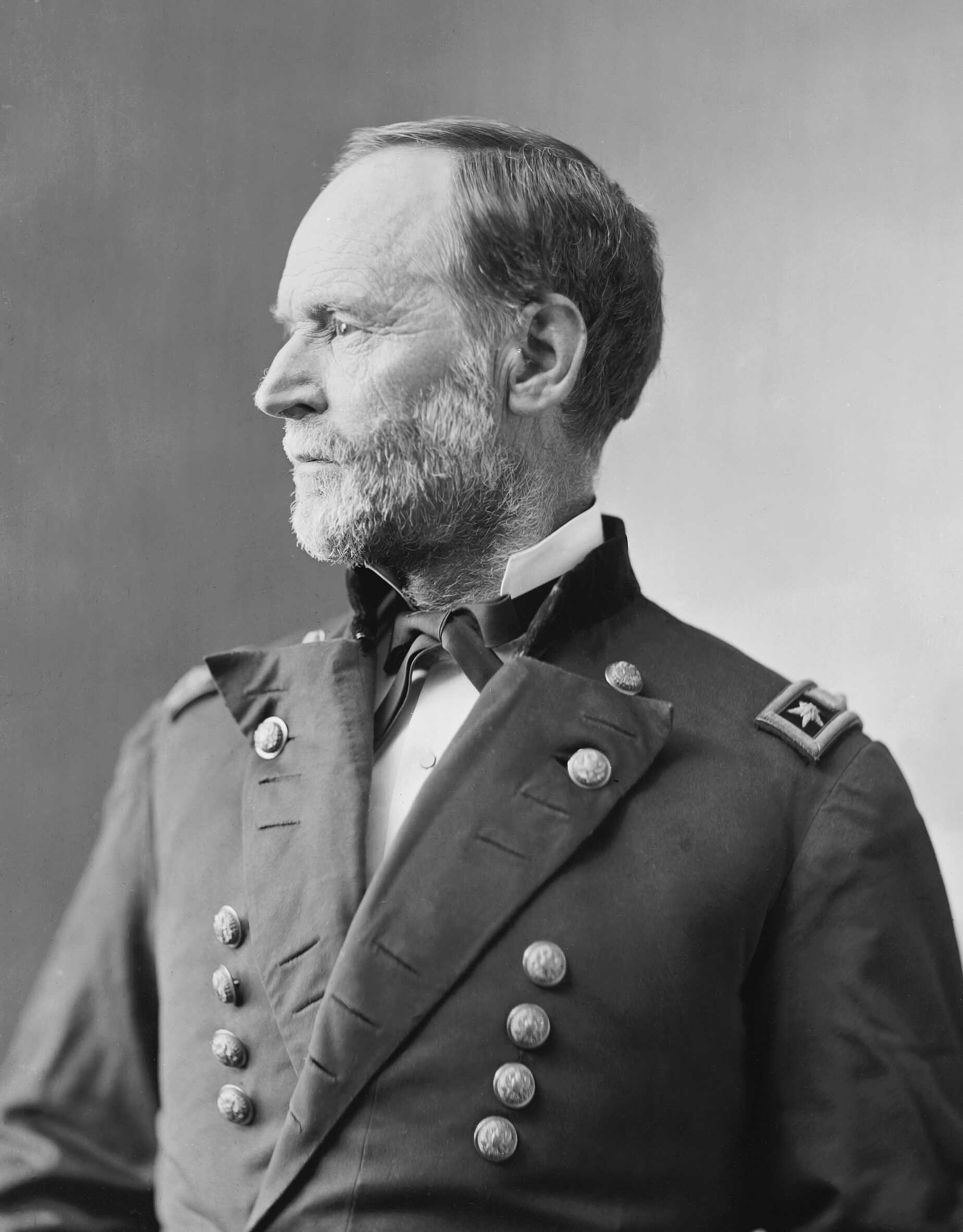
General of the Army Sherman warned Cameron that Southern states threatened to secede from the Union if Democratic candidate Tilden was not elected president.

Three battles took place during summer 1876 while Cameron was in charge of the War Department: including the Battle of Rosebud, the Battle of the Little Big Horn, and the Battle of Slim Buttes. By October 1876, the War Department, under Secretary Cameron, had increased troop levels at Western Indian Agencies to crack down on Indian resistance. This was to prevent another massacre that had taken the lives of Colonel George Armstrong Custer and the 7th Cavalry at the Battle of the Little Bighorn. After all hostile Indians were rounded up a new treaty was signed that ceded the Black Hills to the federal government.

=== Presidential election 1876 crisis ===
After the controversial Presidential election of 1876 the majority of electoral votes for Republican candidate Rutherford B. Hayes and Democratic candidate Samuel J. Tilden were disputed in the Reconstructed states of Louisiana and Florida. Secretary of War Cameron allowed military troops stationed in both contested states to be at the disposal of Republican politicians. Previously in June 1876 at the Republican National convention Secretary Cameron was instrumental in nominating Hayes as the Republican candidate. In his 1876 Annual Report Cameron mentioned that General of the Army William T. Sherman, notifying the War Department, said Southern states threatened to secede from the Union if Tilden was not elected. President Ulysses S. Grant responded through the War Department by having troops concentrated in Louisiana under Brigadier General Christopher C. Augur and reinforced in North Carolina under Brigadier General Thomas H. Ruger. These stationed troops and the delicate and prudent actions of both generals, Augur and Ruger, to keep peace, prevented a second Civil War. A presidential commission set up by Congress and President Grant in 1877 finally chose Hayes to be elected president of the United States. Cameron's father, Senator Simon Cameron, and other Republican politicians lobbied President Hayes that Cameron remain secretary of war, however President Hayes refused, not wanting to be part of any Cameron political dynasty and having desired to nominate his own Cabinet.

== U.S. Senator ==
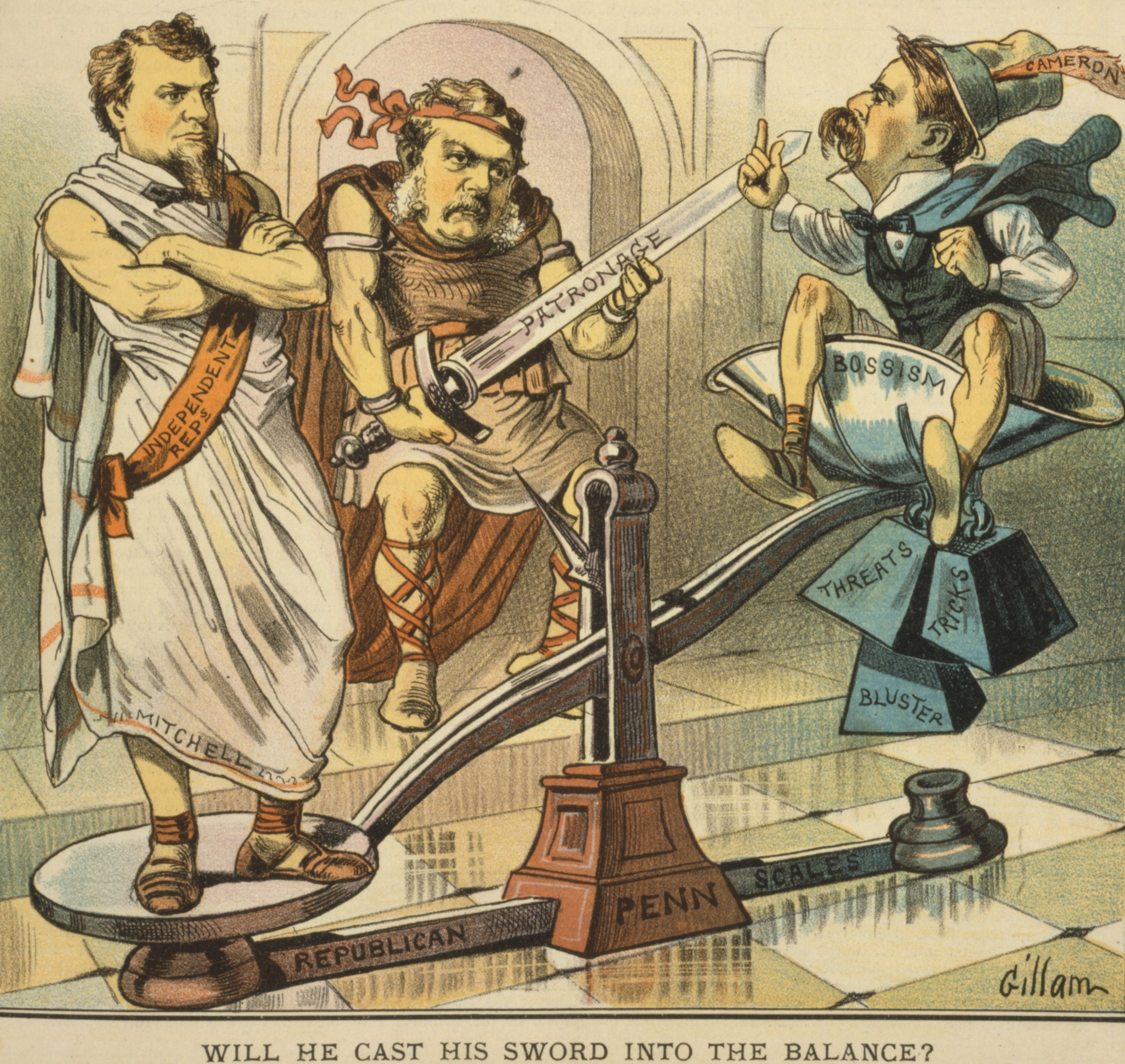
Will he cast his sword into the balance? An 1882 Puck cartoon depicts Cameron and fellow Pennsylvania senator John I. Mitchell on the Republican Pennsylvania Scale. Cameron, sitting on a platform marked "bossism", attempts to weigh himself down with weights marked "threats", "tricks" and "bluster" while Mitchell, dressed as a Roman, stands at the opposite end as an "Independent Republican". President Chester A. Arthur, too dressed as a Roman, holds a sword marked "patronage" which Cameron asks for to even out the balance.

In March 1877, his father resigned his seat in the United States Senate, after receiving assurance that his son would be elected to succeed him by the state legislature. Later that month, Cameron was elected by the Pennsylvania Legislature. He was reelected three more times serving for a total of twenty years. He served as chairman of the Committee on Naval Affairs from 1881 to 1891 and again from 1895 to 1897 and as chairman of the Committee on Revolutionary Claims from 1893 to 1895. Cameron also served as chairman of the Republican National Committee from 1879 to 1880.

Cameron was an active politician who, with the initial aid of his father Simon Cameron, and his political ally Matthew Quay, set up a political machine in the Pennsylvania legislature that ensured Cameron would be reelected to office. Senator Cameron rarely gave speeches, and he was viewed as being judicious, unemotional, and reticent. Cameron disapproved of the popular artful oratory methods used by his contemporaries while his own speeches were forceful and direct. Adopting his father's method, Cameron's strength as a politician relied on working inside the antechamber, committees, and caucuses to obtain his goals. Cameron would ally with other pro-free silver Republicans to block the passage of the Federal Elections Bill, that ensured African Americans' voting protection rights in the Solid South. On the whole, Cameron's nearly twenty years in the Senate remained undistinguished while for the most part he voted on the Republican Party line. Cameron, like his father, protected the interest of the Pennsylvania Railroad PRR, ensuring that Pennsylvania government House Speakers E. Reed Myer and his successor Henry M. Long, remained sympathetic to the PRR.

Cameron was re-elected in 1879, 1885, and in 1891 with his last term ending in March 1897. He was succeeded by Boies Penrose.

== Later career ==
After not being a candidate for reelection in 1896, Cameron engaged in several business enterprises in Harrisburg, Pennsylvania.

== Death and burial ==
Cameron died on August 30, 1918, at his country home called "Donegal" (Cameron Estate) in Lancaster County, Pennsylvania. Cameron was interred at Harrisburg Cemetery in Harrisburg, Pennsylvania. Cameron was the last surviving cabinet member of the Grant Administration.

== Historical reputation ==
Cameron was part of a political family dynasty started by his father Simon Cameron carrying on his legacy as Secretary of War and U.S. Senator. Cameron's ascendancy to Secretary of War, was started when a Democratic controlled House launched an investigation in 1876 into Secretary of War William W. Belknap, who abruptly resigned office over bribery charges. Succeeding Alphonso Taft as Secretary of War, Cameron was in charge of the Great Sioux War and the controversial Election of 1876, that almost caused a second civil war. Cameron was part of a transitional period when civilian control was reestablished over the War Department during the end of Reconstruction. As Senator, Cameron was known as a quiet, but powerful, political boss during the Gilded Age, who supported African American voting rights. Cameron followed in his father Simon's footsteps, protecting the railroad interests of the PPR, in control of Pennsylvania Republican Party politics.

According to Cameron's biographer Howard Meneely, Cameron "made politics, not statesmanship, his principle public business." However, Meneely admired Cameron for breaking from the rest of his party and opposing the African American 1890 voting rights legislation, "Force Bill", saying that Cameron "showed admirable and courageous independence," and demonstrating the racist tendencies common among historians of the era. Meneely concluded that Cameron was "[t]horoughly honest in personal matters" and "held in high regard by his friends". As a political boss, Cameron "took over the active management" of Pennsylvania's political machine created by his father, and "with the aid of lieutenants like Matthew Quay ran it skillfully and defiantly as long as he remained in public life."

On April 17, 1913, the 17th Amendment was ratified that mandated the popular vote to elect U.S. Senators, rather than being chosen by state legislatures. The Senate by this time was known as a "Millionaires Club" and political machines, such as the one Cameron ran in Pennsylvania, controlled who would be elected Senator.

== Marriages, family, and estate ==
Cameron married Mary McCormick on May 20, 1856, and together they had six children: Eliza McCormick Cameron (born 1857), who married William H. Bradley; Virginia Rolette Cameron (born 1861), who married Lt. Alexander Rodgers; James McCormick Cameron (born 1865); Mary Cameron (born 1867); Margaretta Brua Cameron (born 1869), who married John William Clark; and Rachel Burnside Cameron (born 1871).

Cameron's second wife, the former Elizabeth Sherman, whom he married in 1878, was the niece of William Tecumseh Sherman and John Sherman and a close friend of Henry Brooks Adams. Their daughter, Martha Cameron (born 1886), married Sir Ronald Charles Lindsay in 1909.

=== Second wife and two daughters ===
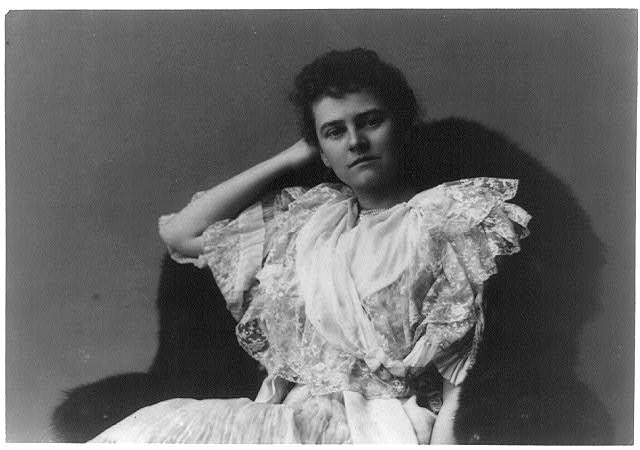
Elizabeth Cameron, second wife of Senator Donald Cameron, Pennsylvania, taken between c. 1890 and c. 1910

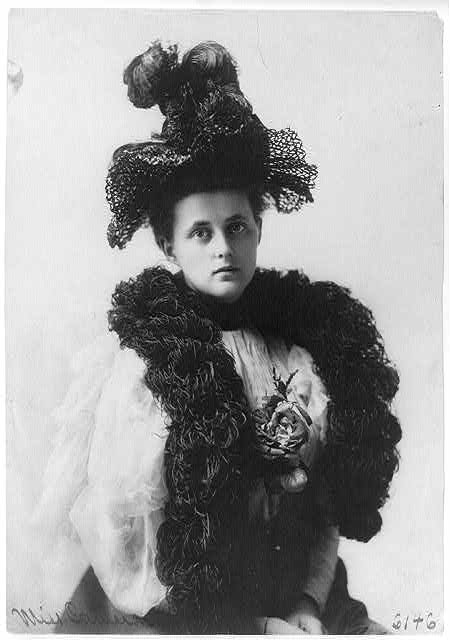
Rachel Cameron, daughter of Senator Donald Cameron, Pennsylvania, c. 1896

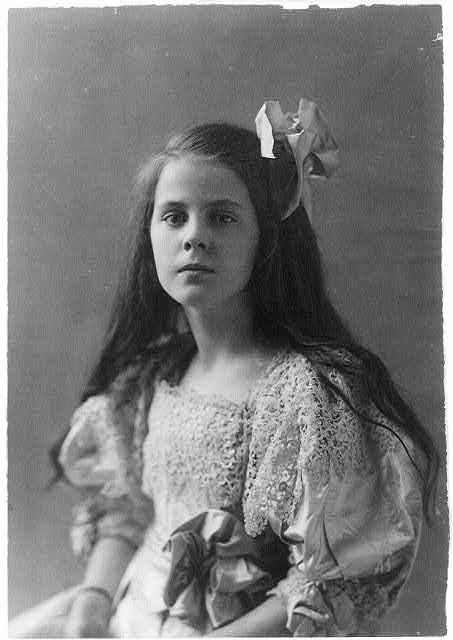
Martha Cameron, daughter of Senator Donald Cameron, Pennsylvania, c. 1896

=== Donegal ===
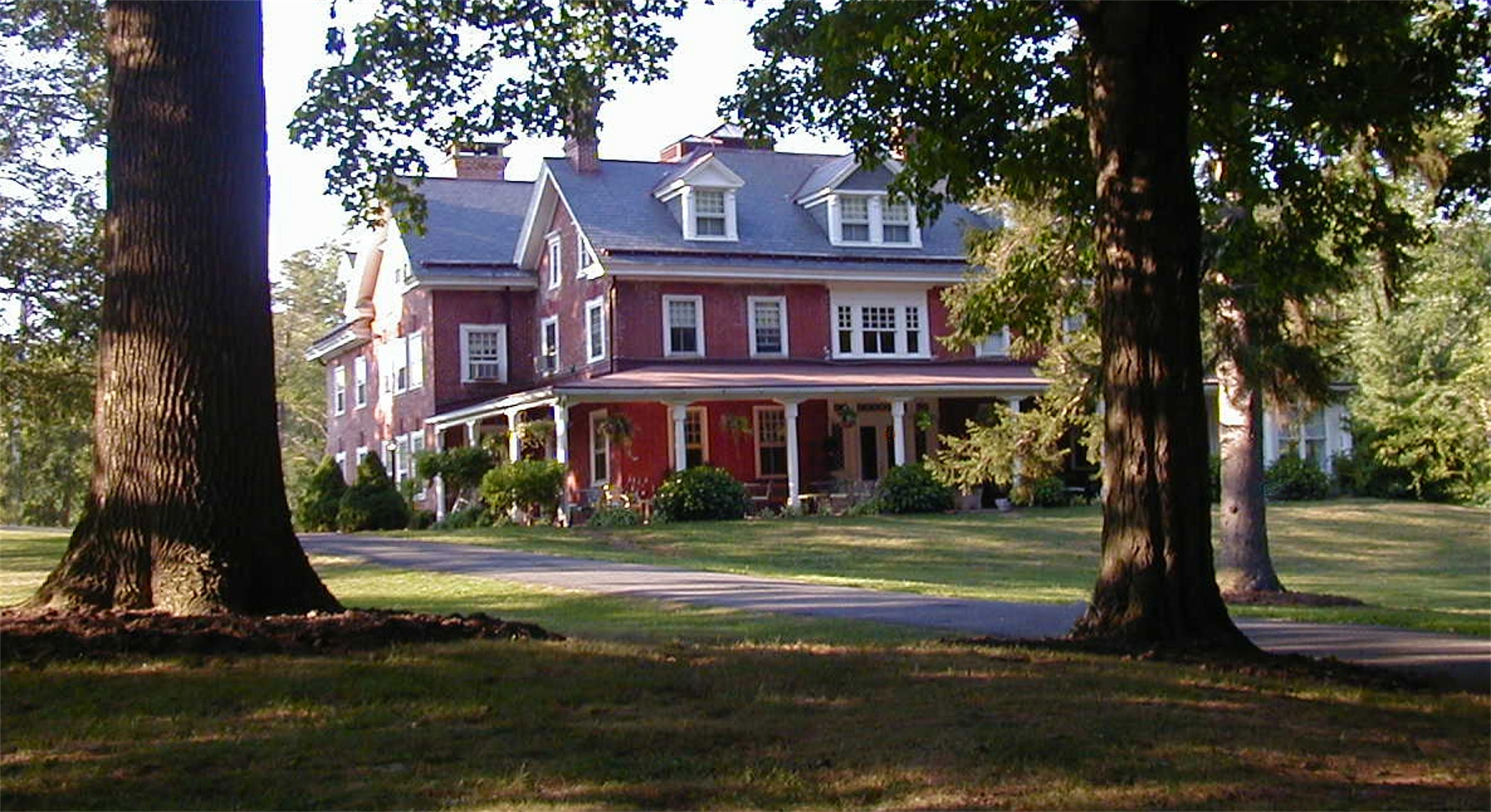
Donegal

When Cameron died in 1918, his estate, which had been put in trust, was worth $4 million (equivalent to $86 million in 2025). Cameron had purchased his father Simon Cameron's affectionately known farm estate, "Donegal", on the Susquehanna River in Lancaster County. Cameron lived at "Donegal" during the summer while during the winter he lived on his house boat off the South Carolina coast.

The Cameron Estate (Donegal) was originally granted by William Penn to James Stephenson, who was the great-great-great-great-grandfather of William McKinley. Cameron's father, Simon Cameron, had purchased the property from Nathanial Watson. Donegal was the home of Cameron's daughter Mary Cameron. In 1961, Cameron's granddaughter, Mary Hale Chase, sold the estate to Elizabethtown College. Charles Baugher, president of the college, designated the property for faculty and student housing, while hosting a satellite campus for special education in collaboration with the Downingtown Special School. In 1979, the college sold the Cameron Estate to a private party. Donegal is currently the Cameron Estate Inn & Restaurant.

== See also ==
- Bibliography of Ulysses S. Grant

== Sources ==
- Bell, William Gardner (1981). Secretarys of War and Secretaries of the Army. Washington, DC: US Army, Center of Military History. OCLC 6603916.
- Benowitz, Jean-Paul; DePuydt, Peter J. (2014). Elizabethtown College. Charleston, South Carolina: Arcadia Publishing. p. 32. ISBN 978-1-4671-2083-8.
- Cameron, J. Donald (November 20, 1876). Annual Report of the Secretary of War. Vol. 1.
- Churella, Albert J. (2013). The Pennsylvania Railroad, Volume 1: Building an Empire, 1846-1917. Philadelphia, Pennsylvania: University of Pennsylvania Press. ISBN 978-0-8122-4348-2.
- Griske, Michael. The Diaries of John Hunton.
- Johnson, Rossiter, ed. (1906). The Biographical Dictionary of America Cameron, James Donald. Boston: American Biographical Society. p. 119.
- Meneely, A. Howard (1929). Allen Johnson (ed.). Dictionary of American Biography Cameron, James Donald. Vol. 3. New York: Charles Scribner's Sons. pp. 435–436.

Political offices
Preceded by Alphonso Taft	United States Secretary of War; 1876–1877	Succeeded by George W. McCrary
U.S. Senate
Preceded by Simon Cameron	U.S. Senator (Class 3) from Pennsylvania; 1877–1897; Served alongside: William A. Wallace, John I. Mitchell, Matt Quay	Succeeded by Boies Penrose
Preceded by John R. McPherson	Chair of the Senate Naval Affairs Committee; 1881–1893	Succeeded by John R. McPherson
Preceded by John R. McPherson	Chair of the Senate Naval Affairs Committee; 1895–1897	Succeeded by Eugene Hale
Party political offices
Preceded by Zachariah Chandler	Chair of the Republican National Committee; 1879–1880	Succeeded by Marshall Jewell
