= 1890–91 United States Senate elections =

- Dates vary by state
- Class 3

29 of the 88 seats in the United States Senate (as well as special elections) 45 seats needed for a majority
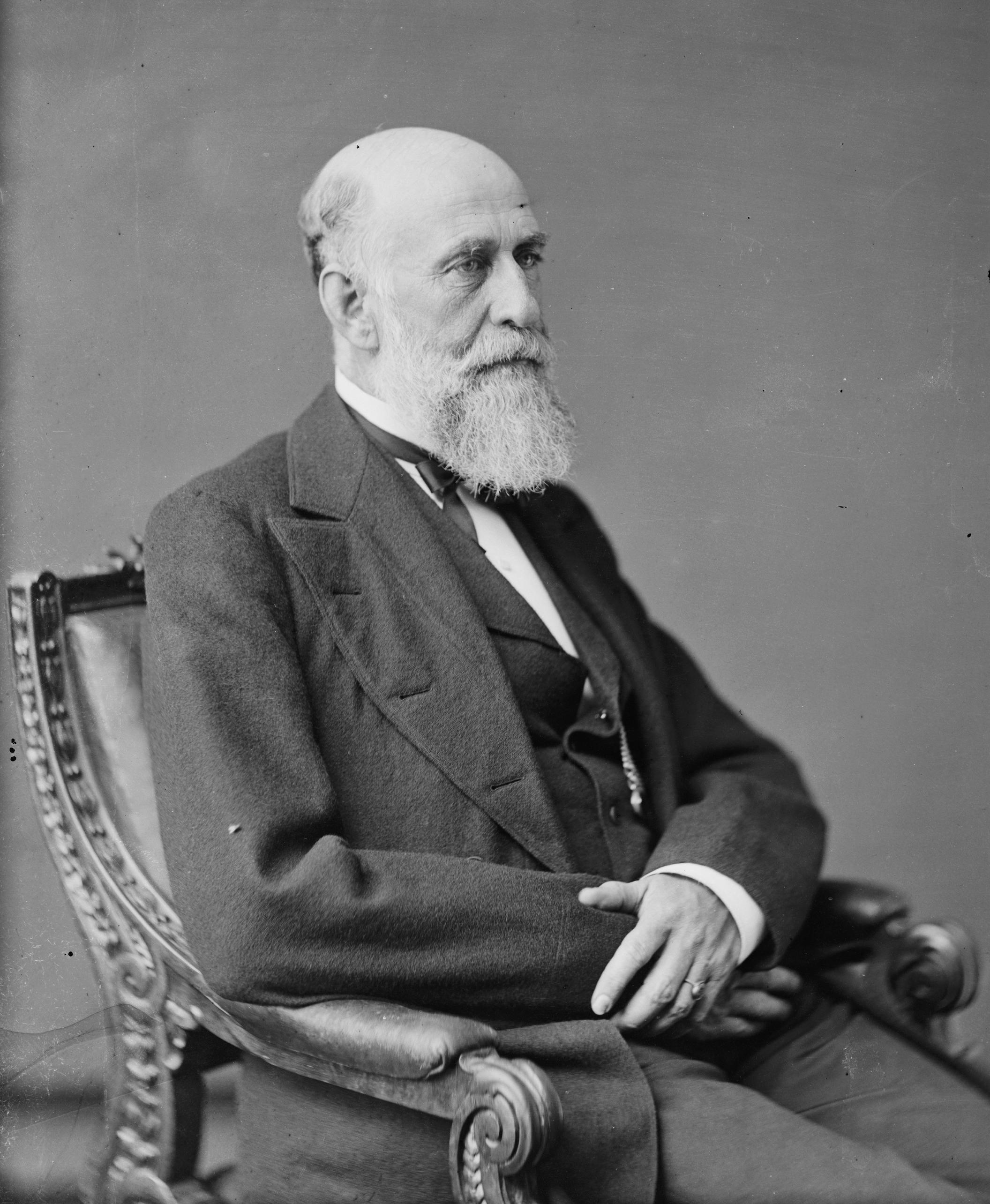

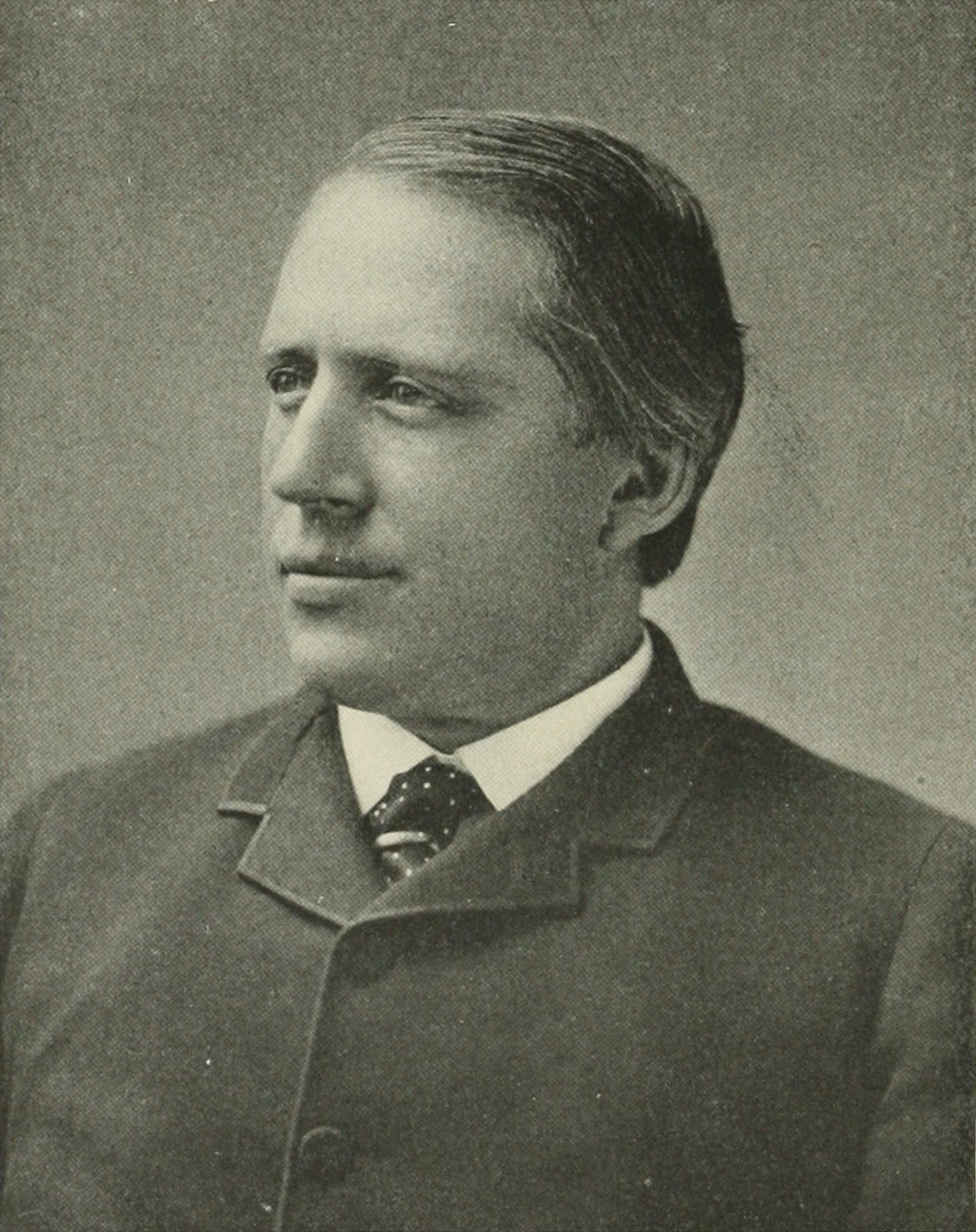
	Majority party	Minority party
Leader	George F. Edmunds (Note: as Republican Conference chair) (retired)	Arthur Pue Gorman (Note: as Democratic Caucus chair)
Party	Republican	Democratic
Leader since	March 4, 1885	March 4, 1889
Leader's seat	Vermont	Maryland
Seats before	38	37
Seats won	12	14
Seats after	47	39
Seat change	▲9	▲2
Seats up	16	12
	Third party	Fourth party
Party	Populist	Independent
Seats before	0	0
Seats won	1	1
Seats after	1	1
Seat change	▲1	▲1
Seats up	0	0
- Results of the elections: Democratic gain Democratic hold Republican gain Republican hold Populist gain Independent gain Legislature failed to elect
Majority party before election
Republican
Elected Majority party
Republican

The 1890–91 United States Senate elections were held on various dates in various states. As these U.S. Senate elections were prior to the ratification of the Seventeenth Amendment in 1913, senators were chosen by state legislatures. Senators were elected over a wide range of time throughout 1890 and 1891, and a seat may have been filled months late or remained vacant due to legislative deadlock. In these elections, terms were up for the senators in Class 3.

The Republican Party lost four seats, though still retaining a slim majority. That majority was increased, however, upon the admission of two more states with Republican senators.

== Results summary ==
Senate party division, 52nd Congress (1891–1893)

- Majority party: Republican (47)
- Minority party: Democratic (39)
- Other parties: Populist (2)
- Total seats: 88

== Change in Senate composition ==
=== Before the elections ===
After the admission of Montana's new senators in January 1890.

								D_{1}	D_{2}
D_{12}	D_{11}	D_{10}	D_{9}	D_{8}	D_{7}	D_{6}	D_{5}	D_{4}	D_{3}
D_{13}	D_{14}	D_{15}	D_{16}	D_{17}	D_{18}	D_{19}	D_{20}	D_{21}	D_{22}
D_{32} Ran	D_{31} Ran	D_{30} Ran	D_{29} Ran	D_{28} Ran	D_{27} Ran	D_{26} Ran	D_{25}	D_{24}	D_{23}
D_{33} Ran	D_{34} Ran	D_{35} Ran	D_{36} Retired	D_{37} Retired	R_{47} Retired	R_{46} Ran	R_{45} Ran	R_{44} Ran	R_{43} Ran
Majority →									R_{43} Ran
R_{33} Ran	R_{34} Ran	R_{35} Ran	R_{36} Ran	R_{37} Ran	R_{38} Ran	R_{39} Ran	R_{40} Ran	R_{41} Ran	R_{42} Ran
R_{32} Ran	R_{31}	R_{30}	R_{29}	R_{28}	R_{27}	R_{26}	R_{25}	R_{24}	R_{23}
R_{13}	R_{14}	R_{15}	R_{16}	R_{17}	R_{18}	R_{19}	R_{20}	R_{21}	R_{22}
R_{12}	R_{11}	R_{10}	R_{9}	R_{8}	R_{7}	R_{6}	R_{5}	R_{4}	R_{3}
								R_{1}	R_{2}

=== After the class 3 elections ===
								D_{1}	D_{2}
D_{12}	D_{11}	D_{10}	D_{9}	D_{8}	D_{7}	D_{6}	D_{5}	D_{4}	D_{3}
D_{13}	D_{14}	D_{15}	D_{16}	D_{17}	D_{18}	D_{19}	D_{20}	D_{21}	D_{22}
D_{32} Re-elected	D_{31} Re-elected	D_{30} Re-elected	D_{29} Re-elected	D_{28} Re-elected	D_{27} Re-elected	D_{26} Re-elected	D_{25}	D_{24}	D_{23}
D_{33} Hold	D_{34} Hold	D_{35} Hold	D_{36} Hold	D_{37} Gain	D_{38} Gain	D_{39} Gain	V_{1} D loss	I_{1} Gain	P_{1} Gain
Majority →									R_{43} New seat
R_{33} Re-elected	R_{34} Re-elected	R_{35} Re-elected	R_{36} Re-elected	R_{37} Re-elected	R_{38} Re-elected	R_{39} Re-elected	R_{40} Re-elected	R_{41} Hold	R_{42} Hold
R_{32} Re-elected	R_{31}	R_{30}	R_{29}	R_{28}	R_{27}	R_{26}	R_{25}	R_{24}	R_{23}
R_{13}	R_{14}	R_{15}	R_{16}	R_{17}	R_{18}	R_{19}	R_{20}	R_{21}	R_{22}
R_{12}	R_{11}	R_{10}	R_{9}	R_{8}	R_{7}	R_{6}	R_{5}	R_{4}	R_{3}
								R_{1}	R_{2}

=== Beginning of the next Congress ===
						D_{1}	D_{2}	D_{3}	D_{4}
D_{14}	D_{13}	D_{12}	D_{11}	D_{10}	D_{9}	D_{8}	D_{7}	D_{6}	D_{5}
D_{15}	D_{16}	D_{17}	D_{18}	D_{19}	D_{20}	D_{21}	D_{22}	D_{23}	D_{24}
D_{34}	D_{33}	D_{32}	D_{31}	D_{30}	D_{29}	D_{28}	D_{27}	D_{26}	D_{25}
D_{35}	D_{36}	V_{1} D seated late	V_{2} D elected late	V_{3} D died Later D	I_{1} Later P	P_{1}	V_{3} D died Later R	R_{46} New seat	R_{45} New seat
Majority →									R_{45} New seat
R_{35}	R_{36}	R_{37}	R_{38}	R_{39}	R_{40}	R_{41}	R_{42}	R_{43}	R_{44} New seat
R_{34}	R_{33}	R_{32}	R_{31}	R_{30}	R_{29}	R_{28}	R_{27}	R_{26}	R_{25}
R_{15}	R_{16}	R_{17}	R_{18}	R_{19}	R_{20}	R_{21}	R_{22}	R_{23}	R_{24}
R_{14}	R_{13}	R_{12}	R_{11}	R_{10}	R_{9}	R_{8}	R_{7}	R_{6}	R_{5}
						R_{1}	R_{2}	R_{3}	R_{4}

Key:

D_{#}	Democratic
I_{#}	Independent
P_{#}	Populist
R_{#}	Republican
V_{#}	Vacant

== Race summaries ==
=== Elections during the 51st Congress ===
In these elections, the winners were seated during 1890 or in 1891 before March 4; ordered by election date.

State	Incumbent			Results	Candidates
State	Senator	Party	Electoral history	Results	Candidates
Montana (Class 1)	None (new state)			Montana admitted to the Union November 8, 1889. First senator elected January 1, 1890. Sanders's election was challenged based on the legitimacy of the nascent state legislature. The Senate resolved the dispute in his favor April 16, 1890, and he was seated that day. Republican gain.	▌ ✓ Wilbur F. Sanders (Republican); ▌William A. Clark (Democratic)
Montana (Class 2)	None (new state)			Montana admitted to the Union November 8, 1889. Second senator elected January 2, 1890. Power's election was challenged based on the legitimacy of the nascent state legislature. The Senate resolved the dispute in his favor April 16, 1890, and he was seated that day. Republican gain.	▌ ✓ Thomas C. Power (Republican); ▌Martin Maginnis (Democratic)
Kentucky (Class 2)	James B. Beck	Democratic	1876; 1881; 1888	Incumbent died May 3, 1890. New senator elected May 17, 1890. Democratic hold.	▌ ✓ John G. Carlisle (Democratic) 107; ▌ Silas Adams (Republican) 15
Wyoming (Class 2)	None (new state)			Wyoming admitted to the Union July 10, 1890. First senators elected November 15, 1890. Republican gain.	▌ ✓ Joseph M. Carey (Republican) 39; ▌George W. Baxter (Democratic) 7
Wyoming (Class 1)	None (new state)			Wyoming admitted to the Union July 10, 1890. First senators elected November 18, 1890. Republican gain.	▌ ✓ Francis E. Warren (Republican) 29; ▌ Henry A. Coffeen (Democratic) 9; ▌M. C. Brown (Unknown) 7; ▌John McCormick (Unknown) 3; ▌H. R. Mann (Unknown) 1
Idaho (Class 2)	None (new state)			Idaho admitted to the Union July 3, 1890. First senators elected December 18, 1890. Republican gain.	▌ ✓ George L. Shoup (Republican) [data missing]
Idaho (Class 3)	None (new state)			Idaho admitted to the Union July 3, 1890. First senators elected December 18, 1890. Republican gain.	▌ ✓ William J. McConnell (Republican) [data missing]

=== Races leading to the 52nd Congress ===
In these regular elections, the winners were elected for the term beginning March 4, 1891; ordered by state.

All of the elections involved the Class 3 seats.

State	Incumbent			Results	Candidates
State	Senator	Party	Electoral history	Results	Candidates
Alabama	James L. Pugh	Democratic	1880 (special); 1884	Incumbent re-elected in 1890.	▌ ✓ James L. Pugh (Democratic) [data missing]
Arkansas	James K. Jones	Democratic	1885	Incumbent re-elected in 1891.	▌ ✓ James K. Jones (Democratic) [data missing]
California	Leland Stanford	Republican	1885	Incumbent re-elected in 1891.	▌ ✓ Leland Stanford (Republican) [data missing]
Colorado	Henry M. Teller	Republican	1885	Incumbent re-elected in 1891.	▌ ✓ Henry M. Teller (Republican) [data missing]
Connecticut	Orville H. Platt	Republican	1879; 1885	Incumbent re-elected in 1891.	▌ ✓ Orville H. Platt (Republican) [data missing]
Florida	Wilkinson Call	Democratic	1879; 1885	Legislature failed to elect. Democratic loss.	None.
Georgia	Joseph E. Brown	Democratic	1880 (special); 1885	Incumbent retired due to illness. Democratic hold.	▌ ✓ John B. Gordon (Democratic) [data missing]
Idaho	William J. McConnell	Republican	1890 (special)	McConnell was elected only to finish the term (see above) and thereafter retired. New senator elected December 18, 1890. Republican hold.	▌ ✓ Fred Dubois (Republican) [data missing]
Illinois	Charles B. Farwell	Republican	1887	Incumbent lost renomination. New senator elected on March 11, 1891, after 154 ballots. Democratic gain.	▌ ✓ John M. Palmer (Democratic) 102; ▌Cicero Lindly (Republican) 100; ▌Alson Streeter (Farmers' Alliance) 1
Indiana	Daniel W. Voorhees	Democratic	1877 (appointed); 1879 (special); 1885	Incumbent re-elected in 1891.	▌ ✓ Daniel W. Voorhees (Democratic) [data missing]
Iowa	William B. Allison	Republican	1872; 1878; 1884	Incumbent re-elected March 5, 1890.	▌ ✓ William B. Allison (Republican) 79; ▌Samuel L. Bestow (Democratic) 63; ▌William Larrabee (Republican) 8
Kansas	John J. Ingalls	Republican	1873; 1879; 1885	Incumbent lost re-election. New senator elected in 1891. Populist gain.	▌ ✓ William A. Peffer (Populist); ▌John J. Ingalls (Republican) [data missing]
Kentucky	J. C. S. Blackburn	Democratic	1884	Incumbent re-elected January 7, 1890.	▌ ✓ J. C. S. Blackburn (Democratic) 95; ▌ A. H. Stewart (Republican) 18
Louisiana	James B. Eustis	Democratic	1890–91	Incumbent lost re-election. New senator elected in 1891. Democratic hold.	▌ ✓ Edward Douglass White (Democratic) [data missing]
Maryland	Ephraim Wilson	Democratic	1884	Incumbent re-elected in 1890, but died February 24, 1891, before the beginning of the next term. Seat remained vacant until November 19, 1891. Democratic loss.	▌ ✓ Ephraim Wilson (Democratic) [data missing]
Missouri	George G. Vest	Democratic	1879; 1885	Incumbent re-elected in 1891.	▌ ✓ George G. Vest (Democratic) [data missing]
Nevada	John P. Jones	Republican	1879; 1885	Incumbent re-elected in 1891.	▌ ✓ John P. Jones (Republican) [data missing]
New Hampshire	Henry W. Blair	Republican	1879; 1885 (appointed); 1885 (special)	Incumbent lost renomination. New senator elected in 1891. Republican hold.	▌ ✓ Jacob H. Gallinger (Republican) [data missing]
New York	William M. Evarts	Republican	1885	Incumbent lost re-election. New senator elected January 21, 1891. Democratic gain.	▌ ✓ David B. Hill (Democratic) 81; ▌William M. Evarts (Republican) 79
North Carolina	Zebulon Vance	Democratic	1879; 1884	Incumbent re-elected in 1890.	▌ ✓ Zebulon Vance (Democratic)
North Dakota	Gilbert A. Pierce	Republican	1889	Incumbent lost re-election. New senator elected in 1891. Republican hold.	▌ ✓ Henry C. Hansbrough (Republican); ▌Gilbert A. Pierce (Republican) [data missing]
Ohio	Henry B. Payne	Democratic	1884	Incumbent retired. New senator elected January 15, 1890; Democratic hold.	▌ ✓ Calvin S. Brice (Democratic) [data missing]
Oregon	John H. Mitchell	Republican	1885	Incumbent re-elected in 1890.	▌ ✓ John H. Mitchell (Republican) [data missing]
Pennsylvania	J. Donald Cameron	Republican	1877 (special); 1879; 1885	Incumbent re-elected January 20, 1891.	▌ ✓ J. Donald Cameron (Republican) 144; ▌Chauncey F. Black (Democratic) 94; Others 12; see below
South Carolina	Wade Hampton III	Democratic	1884	Incumbent lost re-election. New senator elected in 1890. Democratic hold.	▌ ✓ John L. M. Irby (Democratic); ▌Wade Hampton III (Democratic) [data missing]
South Dakota	Gideon C. Moody	Republican	1889	Incumbent lost re-election. New senator elected February 16, 1891. Independent gain. Winner later became a Populist.	▌ ✓ James H. Kyle (Independent) 75; ▌Bartlett Tripp (Democratic) 8; ▌Norman B. Campbell (Unknown) 1
Vermont	Justin S. Morrill	Republican	1866; 1872; 1878; 1884	Incumbent re-elected in 1890.	▌ ✓ Justin S. Morrill (Republican) [data missing]
Washington	Watson C. Squire	Republican	1889	Incumbent re-elected in 1891.	▌ ✓ Watson C. Squire (Republican) [data missing]
Wisconsin	John C. Spooner	Republican	1885	Incumbent lost re-election. New senator elected January 28, 1891. Democratic gain.	▌ ✓ William F. Vilas (Democratic) 64.57%; ▌John C. Spooner (Republican) 35.43%

=== Election during the 52nd Congress ===
In these elections, the winners were elected in 1891 after March 4; ordered by election date.

State	Incumbent			Results	Candidates
State	Senator	Party	Electoral history	Results	Candidates
California (Class 1)	George Hearst	Democratic	1887	Incumbent died February 28, 1891. New senator elected March 19, 1891. Republican gain.	▌ ✓ Charles N. Felton (Republican); [data missing]
Florida (Class 3)	Vacant			Legislature had failed to elect; see above. Predecessor re-elected May 26, 1891. Democratic hold.	▌ ✓ Wilkinson Call (Democratic); [data missing]
Virginia (Class 1)	John W. Daniel	Democratic	1887	Incumbent re-elected early December 16, 1891 for the term beginning March 4, 1893.	▌ ✓ John W. Daniel (Democratic); [data missing]

== Idaho ==
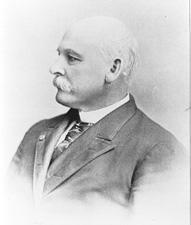
Senator George Shoup (class 2)

Idaho class 3 senator

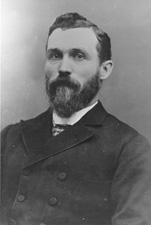
William J. McConnell
(December 18, 1890 – March 3, 1891)

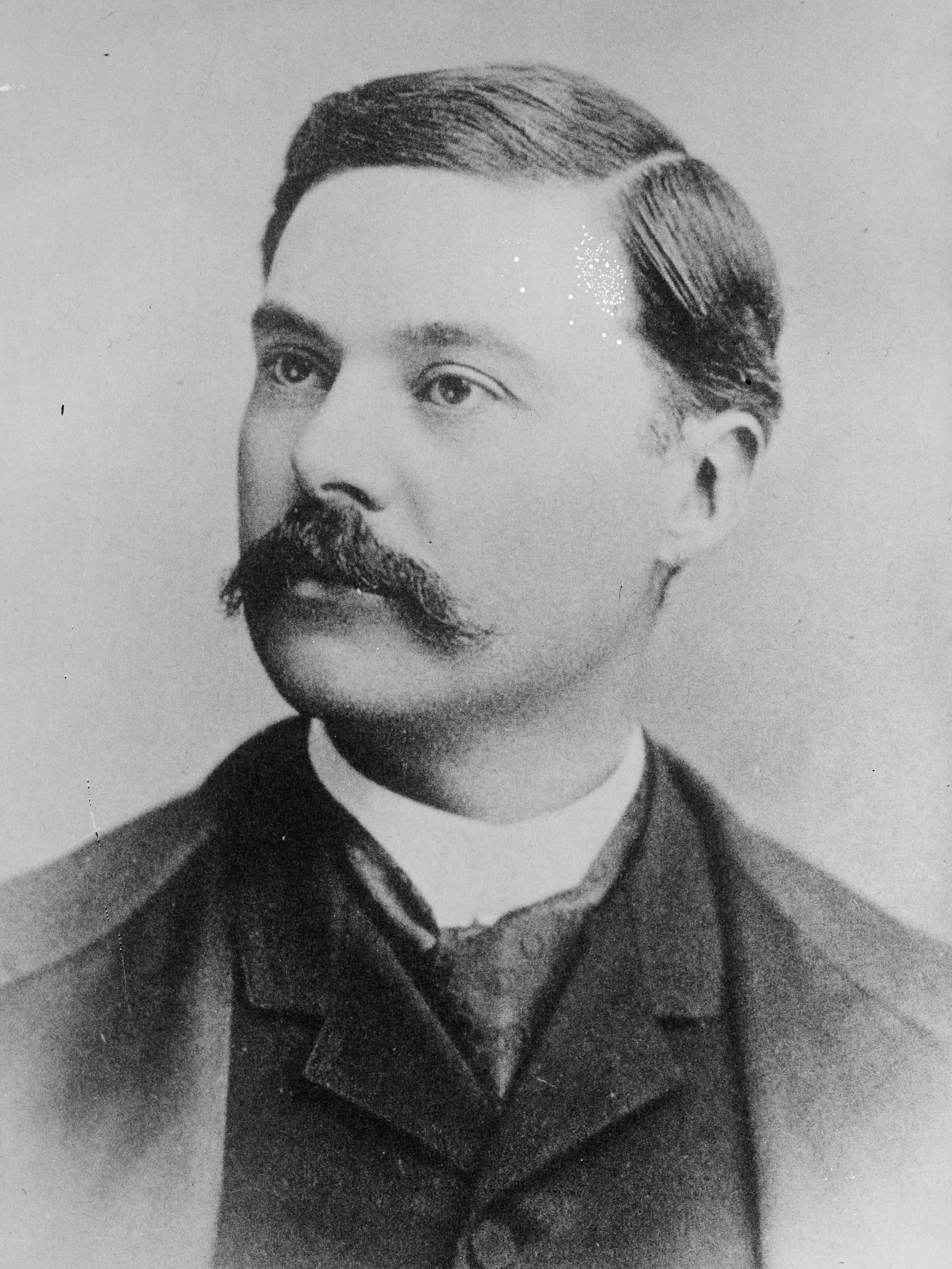
Fred Dubois
(March 4, 1891 – March 3, 1897)

In July 1890, Idaho became a state. In November, Fred Dubois helped engineer a plan for the Idaho Legislature to effectively elect three people to the U.S. Senate: Governor George Shoup to the class 2 seat up for election in 1894, state constitutional convention member William J. McConnell to serve for the remainder of the Fifty-first United States Congress, ending in March 1891, and Dubois himself to succeed McConnell and serve a full six-year term in the class 3 seat beginning in March 1891.

== Maryland ==
1890 United States Senate election in Maryland
- January 1890

80 members of the Maryland General Assembly
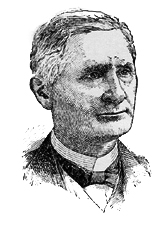
Candidate	Ephraim King Wilson II
Party	Democratic
Legislative vote	-
Percentage	-%	%

Ephraim King Wilson II was re-elected by an unknown margin of votes, for the Class 3 seat.

== New York ==
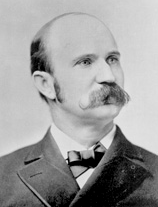
Senator David B. Hill

The New York election was held January 20 and 21, 1891, by the New York State Legislature.

Republican William M. Evarts had been elected to this seat in 1885, and his term would expire on March 3, 1891.

At the state election in November 1889, 19 Republicans and 13 Democrats were elected for a two-year term (1890–1891) in the State Senate. At the state election in November 1890, 68 Democrats and 60 Republicans were elected for the session of 1891 to the Assembly. The 114th New York State Legislature met from January 6 to April 30, 1891, at Albany, New York.

The Democratic caucus met on January 19, 74 state legislators attended, and State Senator John C. Jacobs presided. Governor David B. Hill was nominated by acclamation.

The Republican caucus met immediately after the Democratic caucus ended, Assemblyman James W. Husted presided. They re-nominated the incumbent U.S. Senator William M. Evarts unanimously.

On January 20, both houses of the state legislature took ballots separately. The incumbent U.S. Senator Evarts was the choice of the State Senate, Governor Hill the choice of the Assembly. On January 21, both houses met in joint session, and comparing nominations, found that they disagreed and proceeded to a joint ballot. Governor Hill was elected by a majority of 2, every member of the Legislature being present.

House	Democratic		Republican	
State Senate (32 members)	David B. Hill	13	✓ William M. Evarts	19
State Assembly (128 members)	✓ David B. Hill	65	William M. Evarts	58
Joint ballot (160 members)	✓ David B. Hill	81	William M. Evarts	79

The seat became vacant on March 4, 1891. David B. Hill remained in office as Governor of New York until December 31, 1891, and took his seat only on January 7, 1892, missing actually only one month of session. There were no special sessions during the 52nd United States Congress and the regular session began only on December 7, 1891. Hill served a single term, and remained in the U.S. Senate until March 3, 1897. In January 1897, Hill was defeated for re-election by Republican Thomas C. Platt who had been a U.S. Senator briefly in 1881.

== Pennsylvania ==
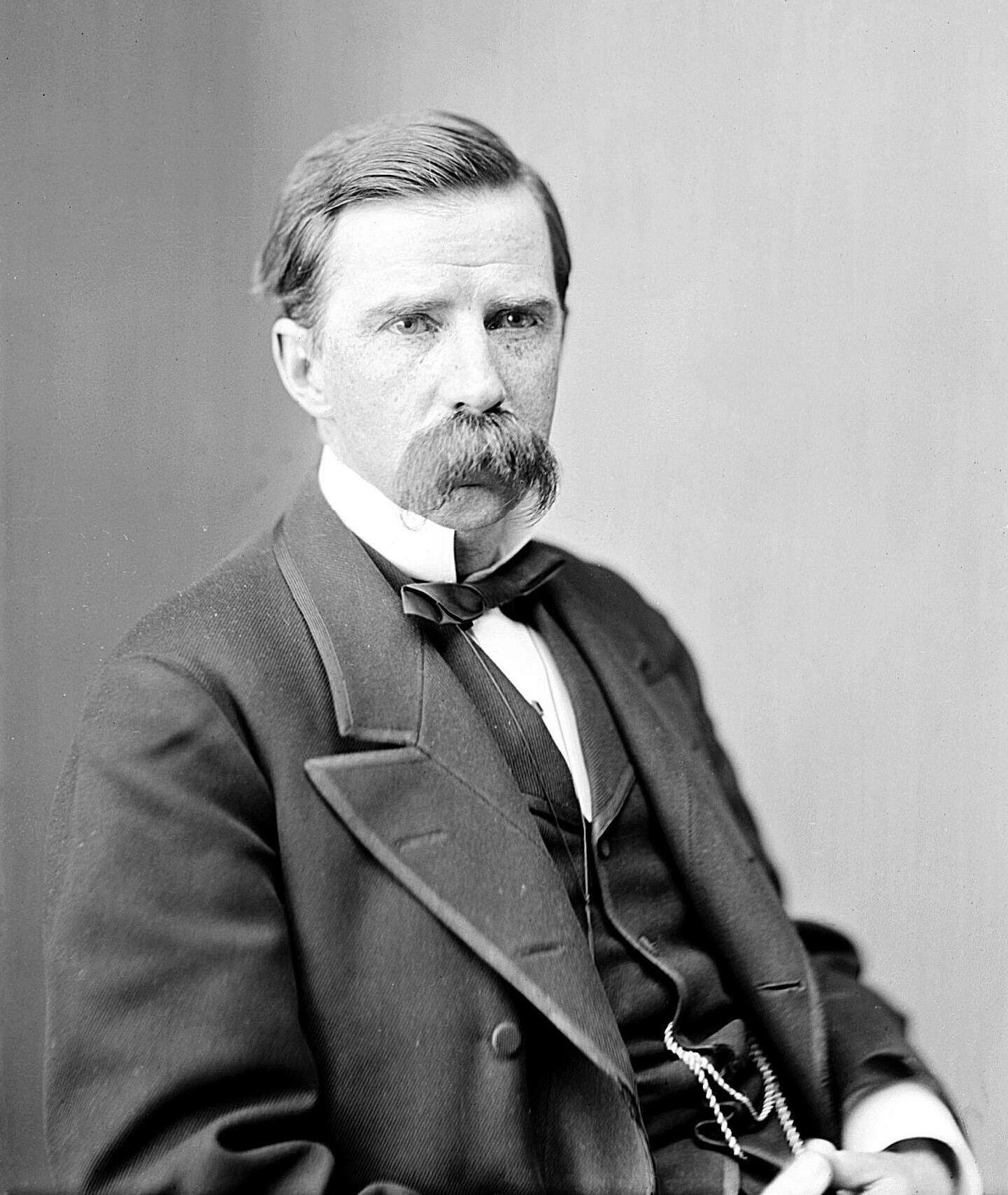
Senator J. Donald Cameron

The Pennsylvania election was held on January 20, 1891. J. Donald Cameron was re-elected by the Pennsylvania General Assembly to the United States Senate.

The Pennsylvania General Assembly, consisting of the House of Representatives and the Senate, convened on January 20, 1891. Incumbent Republican J. Donald Cameron, who was elected in an 1877 special election and re-elected in 1879 and 1885, was a successful candidate for re-election to another term. The results of the vote of both houses combined are as follows:

State legislature results
Party	Candidate	Votes	%
Republican	J. Donald Cameron (incumbent)	144	56.69
Democratic	Chauncey F. Black	94	37.01
Republican	Austin L. Taggart	7	2.76
Republican	Theodore L. Flood	3	1.18
Democratic	J. C. Sibley	1	0.39
Republican	Harry White	1	0.39
N/A	Not voting	4	1.57
Totals		254	100%

== See also ==
- 1890 United States elections
  - 1890 United States House of Representatives elections
- 51st United States Congress
- 52nd United States Congress
