= Hosea H. Moore =

American politician (1842–1913)

Hosea Hartwell Moore
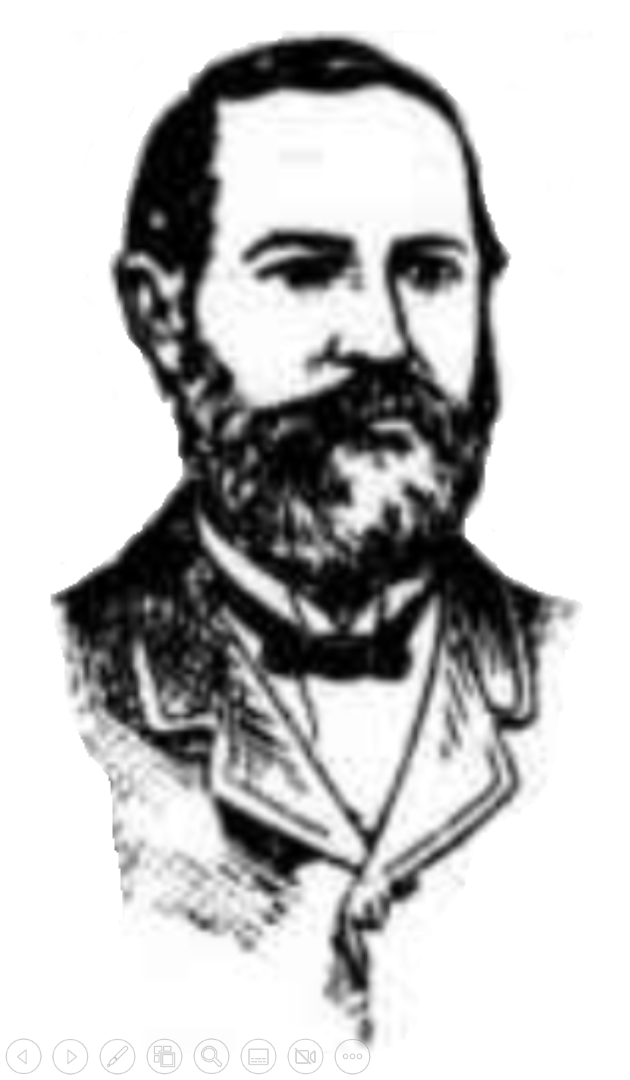
- Sketch of Hosea H. Moore appearing in the Caldwell Tribune (1890)

Member of the Illinois House of Representatives from the 76th district
- In office 1891 – 1893

Personal details
- Born: November 18, 1842 Washington County, Illinois, U.S.
- Died: January 7, 1913 (aged 70) Fairfield, Illinois, U.S.
- Party: Farmers' Alliance
- Other political affiliations: Democratic
- Spouse: Ellen Walker (m. 1865, died)
- Children: 4
- Parent(s): Cynthia Right & Hartwell Moore
- Education: University of Michigan; McKendree University
- Occupation: Doctor; Farmer; Politician

Hosea Hartwell Moore (November 18, 1842 ― January 7, 1913) was an American medical doctor, farmer, and politician who served as a member of the Illinois House of Representatives from 1891 to 1893.

== Early life and education ==
Hosea Hartwell Moore was born November 18, 1842, in Washington County, Illinois. Moore attended the University of Michigan and graduated with a medical degree. He returned to Washington County and practiced medicine until he began further studies at McKendree University in 1878. He was married in 1865 to Ellen Walker of Washington County. After graduating McKendree in 1884, Moore moved to Wayne County, Illinois, and owned a large farm near Mount Erie.

== Career ==
An active member of the Democratic Party, he represented Massilon Township on the Wayne County Board of Supervisors for periods of time before and after his time in the Illinois House. In 1888, he ran for the Illinois House of Representatives as a Democrat, but lost. In 1890, he ran as a candidate of the Farmers' Alliance and won one of three seats in the 46th district. He was the Farmers’ Alliance’s candidate for Speaker of the House receiving the votes of himself, and the other two members of the Farmers' Alliance elected to the Illinois House; Herman Taubeneck of Clark County and James Cockrell of Marion County. In the 1890 United States Senate election, the Farmers' Alliance legislators held the balance of power over whom the Illinois General Assembly appointed to the United States Senate. The "Big Three" chose to support Alson Streeter. Moore, along with Cockrell, ultimately defected from both Streeter and the Republican-proposed "compromise" candidate Cicero Lindly to their Democratic roots giving the election to John M. Palmer. These defections irreparably damaged the reputation of the Farmers' Mutual Benefit Association and Moore was not reelected to the Illinois House.

== Personal life ==
Hosea had 4 children. Moore died at his home in Fairfield on January 7, 1913, where he lived with his wife Ellen and their daughter Eunice.
