= Herman Taubeneck =

American politician (1855–1900)

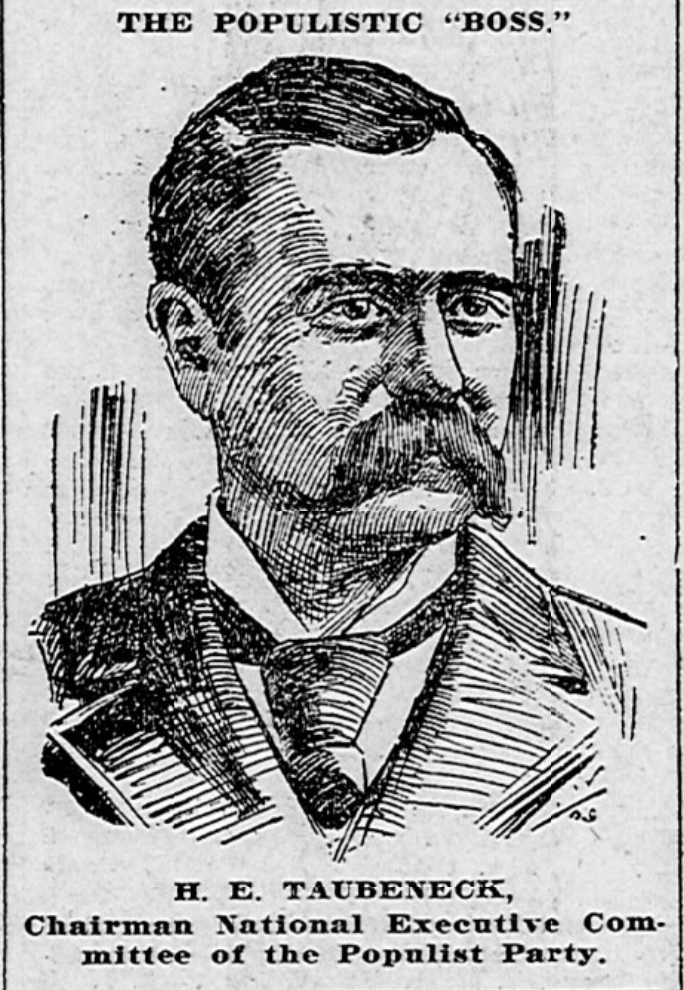
- Illustration of Herman Taubeneck (1896)

Chairman of the People's Party National Executive Committee
- In office 1891 – 1896
- Preceded by: Position established
- Succeeded by: Marion Butler

Personal details
- Born: January 2, 1855 Terre Haute, Indiana
- Died: March 19, 1900 (aged 45) Seattle, Washington
- Party: Populist (1892-1900); Farmers' Alliance (1890-92)
- Occupation: Farmer; Politician

Herman Emil Taubeneck (January 2, 1855 – March 19, 1900) was an American politician who served as a member of the Illinois House of Representatives and as National Chairman of the People's Party.

== Early life ==
Herman Emil Taubeneck was born January 2, 1855, in Terre Haute, Indiana to German-American immigrants Otto and Emma Taubeneck (née Nonneubluck) The family lived in Terre Haute until moving to a farmer near Marshall, Illinois in 1860. His formal education consisted of schooling typical of the era, one course at Commercial College in Terre Haute, and reading law working under Jacob W. Wilkin at the firm of Wilkin & Wilkin in Marshall. In the late 1880s, he engaged in the timber business and as a contractor for ties, staves, and piling.

== Illinois House of Representatives ==
In the 1890 general election, Taubeneck was elected to the Illinois House of Representatives as one of three representatives from the 45th district alongside Democrat Lawrence Kelly and Republican Ethelbert Callahan. Two other members of Farmers' Alliance were elected that cycle; James Cockrell of Marion County and Hosea H. Moore of Wayne County. In the 1892 general election, Taubeneck was not a successful candidate for reelection, with the 45th district returning Democratic incumbent Lawrence Kelly, Democratic newcomer James P. Warren, and Republican incumbent Ethelbert Callahan to the House.

In the 1891 United States Senate election, the Farmers' Alliance legislators held the balance of power over whom the Illinois General Assembly appointed to the United States Senate. The "Big Three" chose to support Alson Streeter. While Taubeneck stuck with Streeter, Cockrell and Moore defected from the Farmers' Alliance position and voted with the Democratic caucus for John M. Palmer. These defections irreparably damaged the reputation of the Farmers' Mutual Benefit Association.

Early in his term, Taubeneck was accused of actually being W. H. Rogers, a criminal who defrauded his way out of an Ohio prison in 1886. A five-member committee was established by the Illinois House to investigate the matter. Ultimately, the accusation was put to bed due to the height disparity between Taubeneck and Rogers.

== National Populist Party ==
Taubeneck's steadfast backing of Streeter and refusal to defect to Palmer during the Senate election won him national accolades and inspired his fellow Populists to elect him chair of the national party. He served as chairman from 1891 to 1896. While chairman, Taubeneck was an advocate for the Populist embrace of the Free Silver movement and of fusionism. After the 1896 convention, Marion Butler became the party's chair. In the 1896 United States presidential election, Taubeneck served as a presidential elector for the Bryan-Watson ticket.

== Death ==
In 1898, he moved to Washington. He died March 19, 1900, in Seattle, Washington.

Party political offices
Preceded by Position established	Chairman of the People's Party National Executive Committee; 1891–1896	Succeeded by Marion Butler
Political offices
Preceded by Walter Cole (R); William G. Williams (D); William G. Delashmutt (D)	Member of the Illinois House of Representatives from the 45th district 1891–1893	Succeeded by Lawrence Kelly (D); Ethelbert Callahan (R); James P. Warren (D)
