= James Cockrell =

American politician

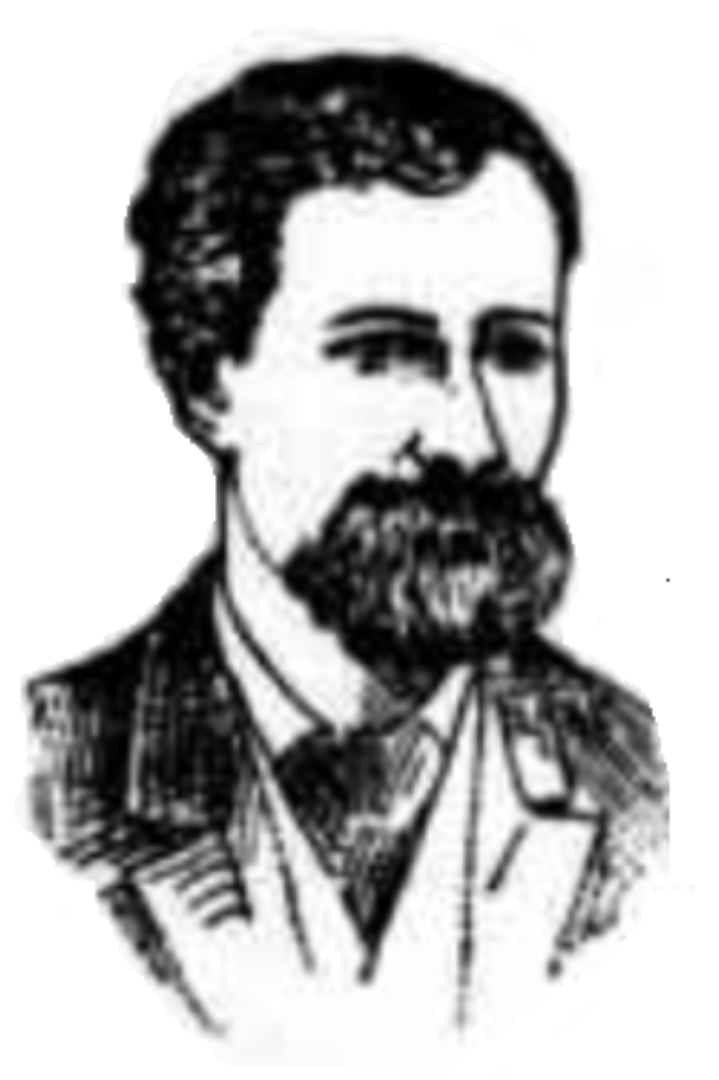
Sketch of James Cockrell appearing in the Caldwell Tribune (1890)

James Cockrell (1840-1917) was an American farmer and politician who served as a member of the Illinois House of Representatives during the 37th Illinois General Assembly.

James Cockrell was born in Meacham Township, Marion County, Illinois to Felix Cockrell and Elizabeth Craig Cockrell on January 19, 1840. He served in the Union Army during the American Civil War. Cockrell was a farmer and served as a correspondent for the National Economist and other agricultural publications.

Previously a Democrat, in the 1890 general election, Cockrell, along with Hosea H. Moore and Herman Taubeneck, was one of three legislators elected on the Farmers' Alliance line. Cockrell was elected from the 43rd district.

In the 1890 United States Senate election, the Farmers' Alliance legislators held the balance of power over whom the Illinois General Assembly appointed to the United States Senate. The "Big Three" initially chose to support Alson Streeter. Over the course of 154 ballots, Cockrell voted for Streeter and various other candidates. Ultimately, Cockrell, along with Moore, ultimately defected from both Streeter and the Republican-proposed "compromise" candidate Cicero Lindly back to their Democratic roots giving the election to John M. Palmer. Cockrell ran for reelection on the Populist Party's line and was unsuccessful. Cockrell died February 10, 1917, at his daughter's home in Salem, Illinois.
