= 1891 United States Senate election in New York =

- January 20 and 21, 1891

Majority vote of state legislature required to win
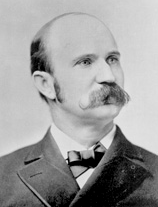

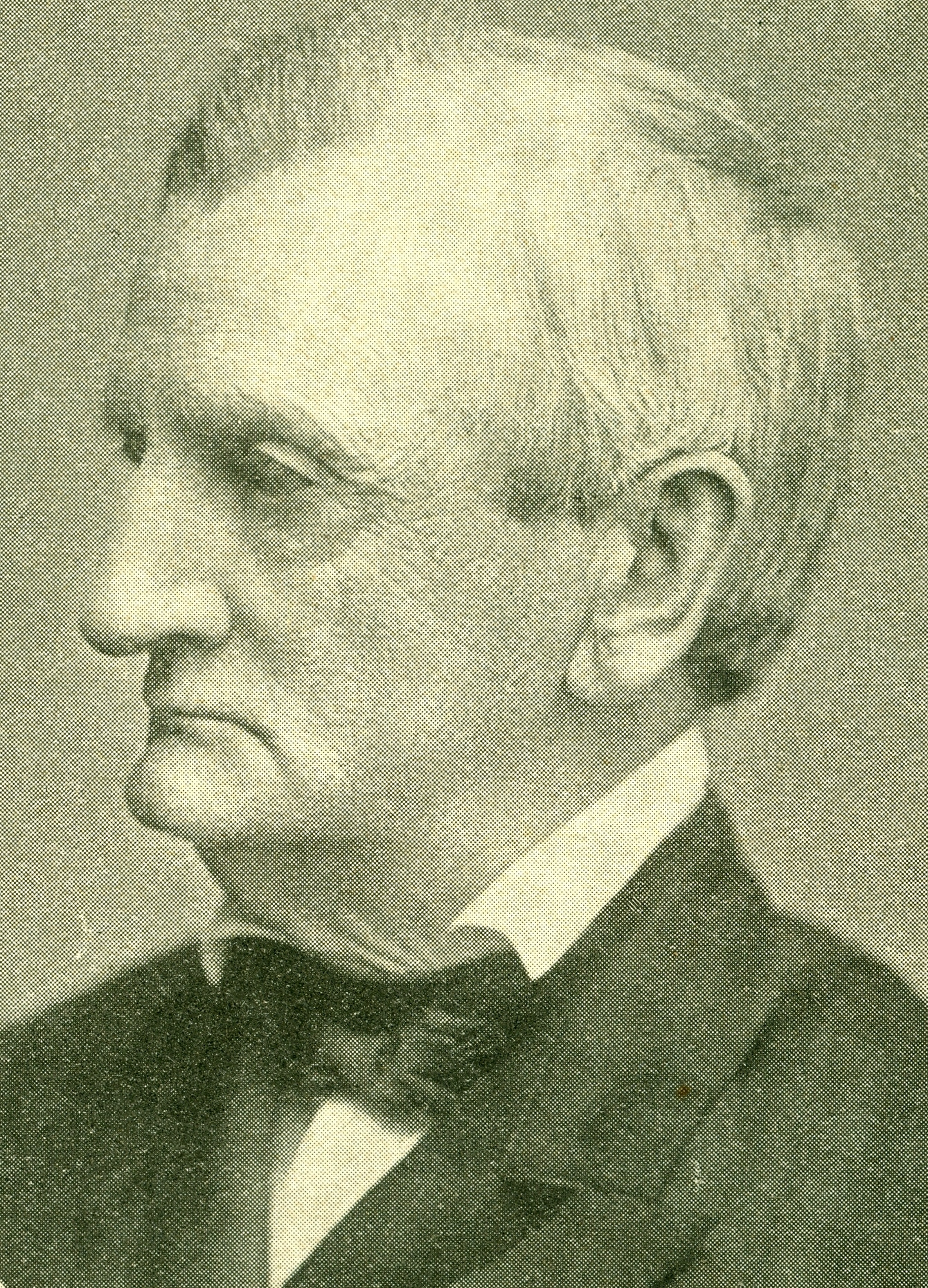
Nominee	David B. Hill	William M. Evarts
Party	Democratic	Republican
Electoral vote	81	79
Percentage	50.625%	49.375%
Senator before election
William M. Evarts
Republican
Elected Senator
David B. Hill
Democratic

The 1891 United States Senate election in New York was held on January 20 and 21, 1891, by the New York State Legislature to elect a U.S. senator (Class 3), to represent the State of New York in the United States Senate.

== Background ==
Republican William M. Evarts had been elected to this seat in 1885, and his term would expire on March 3, 1891.

At the State election in November 1889, 19 Republicans and 13 Democrats were elected for a two-year term (1890-1891) in the State Senate. At the State election in November 1890, 68 Democrats and 60 Republicans were elected for the session of 1891 to the Assembly. The 114th New York State Legislature met from January 6 to April 30, 1891, at Albany, New York.

== Candidates ==
Smith Mead Weed was a major organizer and financial supporter of the Democratic effort to claim control of the legislature in the 1890 elections. With a small minority in the Senate but a slightly larger majority in the Assembly, the Democrats were positioned to elect one of their own on the legislature's joint ballot. Weed expected to be the Democratic candidate, but agreed to withdraw if Governor David B. Hill desired the nomination. Hill decided to run and Weed withdrew. When the Democratic caucus met on January 19, 74 State legislators attended, and State Senator John C. Jacobs presided. Governor David B. Hill was nominated by acclamation.

The Republican caucus met immediately after the Democratic caucus ended, Assemblyman James W. Husted presided. They re-nominated the incumbent U.S. Senator William M. Evarts unanimously.

== Result ==
On January 20, both Houses of the State legislature took ballots separately. The incumbent U.S. Senator Evarts was the choice of the State Senate, Gov. Hill the choice of the Assembly. On January 21, both Houses met in joint session, and comparing nominations, found that they disagreed and proceeded to a joint ballot. Gov. Hill was elected by a majority of 2, every member of the Legislature being present.

1891 United States Senator election result
Office	House	Democrat		Republican	
U.S. Senator (Class 3)	State Senate (32 members)	David B. Hill	13	William M. Evarts	19
	State Assembly (128 members)	David B. Hill	65	William M. Evarts	58
	Joint ballot (160 members)	David B. Hill	81	William M. Evarts	79

== Aftermath ==
The seat became vacant on March 4, 1891. David B. Hill remained in office as Governor of New York until December 31, 1891, and took his seat only on January 7, 1892, missing actually only one month of session. There were no special sessions during the 52nd United States Congress and the regular session began only on December 7, 1891. Hill served a single term, and remained in the U.S. Senate until March 3, 1897. In January 1897, Hill was defeated for re-election by Republican Thomas C. Platt who had been a U.S. Senator briefly in 1881.

== See also ==
- United States Senate elections, 1890 and 1891
