= Charles F. Brown =

American lawyer and politician (1844–1929)

Charles Brown
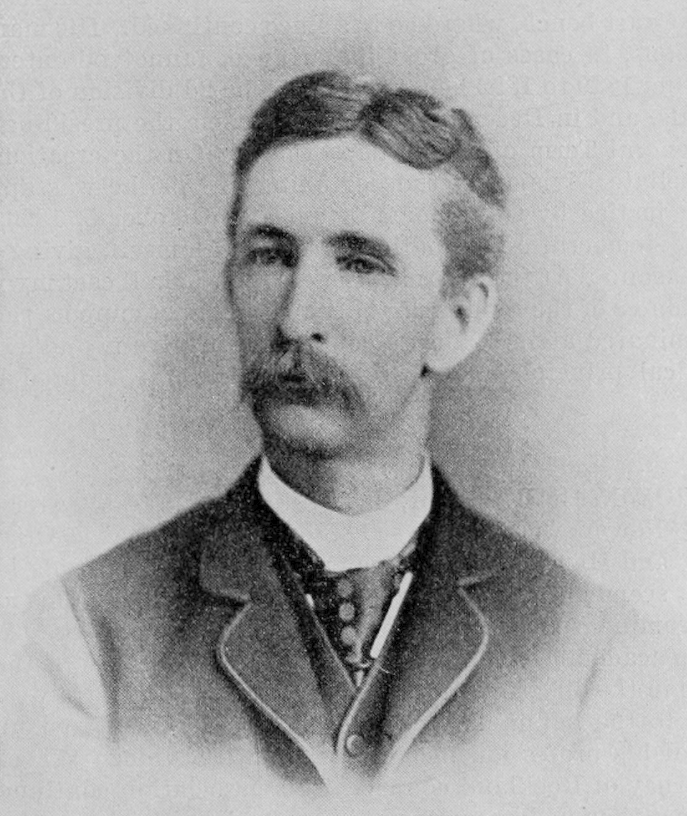

Judge of the New York Court of Appeals
- In office 1889–1892
- Appointed by: David B. Hill

Judge of the New York Supreme Court
- In office 1882–1889

Secretary of the New York State Democratic Committee
- In office 1880–1882
- In office 1874

Personal details
- Born: September 12, 1844 Newburgh, New York, U.S.
- Died: June 19, 1929 (aged 84) Balmville, New York, U.S.
- Spouse: Harriet E. Schaffer
- Children: 2
- Parent: John W. Brown (father)
- Education: Yale University (LLB)
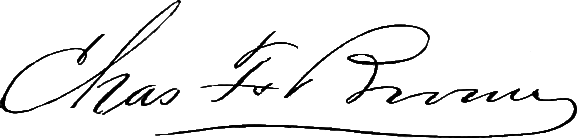
- Signature

Charles Francis Brown (September 12, 1844 – June 19, 1929), was an American lawyer and judge from New York.

== Early life and education ==
Brown was born on September 12, 1844, in Newburgh, New York. He was the son of John W. Brown, a Scottish immigrant who served as congressman and justice for both the New York Supreme Court and the New York Court of Appeals.

Brown attended the Phillips Academy in Andover. He graduated from Yale University in 1866, and was admitted to the bar two years later. In 1896, Yale honored Brown with an honorary LL.D.

== Career ==
Brown practiced law in Newburgh with Abram S. Cassedy under the law firm Cassedy & Brown. Brown served as district attorney of Orange County from 1874 to 1877. In 1877, he was elected county judge.

In 1882, he became a justice in the New York Supreme Court. In 1889, New York governor David B. Hill appointed him to the Second Division of the New York Court of Appeals. He served there until 1892, when that court expired. He was then assigned presiding judge to the General Term, Supreme Court, Second Department. When the Appellate Division was created in 1896, governor Levi P. Morton appointed him presiding Justice of the Second Division. While serving on the court, he was involved in a number of important cases, including writing the prevailing opinion for the Tilden will case. At the end of his term as Justice, he was renominated but declined to run for re-election.

Brown served as a secretary for the New York State Democratic Committee in 1874 and from 1880 to 1882. In the 1894 New York state election, he was the Democratic candidate for the New York Court of Appeals. From 1897 to 1901, he served as general counsel for the Metropolitan Street Railway Company. He then engaged in general practice, retiring in 1922.

== Personal life and death ==
In 1876, Brown married Harriet E. Schaffer of Poughkeepsie. They had two daughters, Florence E. (wife of Edouard A. Jova) and Anna H. (wife of Dudley Hardy). He was a member of Scroll and Keys, Delta Kappa Epsilon, the New York State Bar Association, the New York City Bar Association, the University Club, and the Yale Club.

Brown died at home in Balmville from indigestion on June 19, 1929. He was buried in Cedar Hill Cemetery.
