= 1891 United States Senate election in Illinois =

- 13 January – 11 March 1891

Majority of Illinois General Assembly needed to win
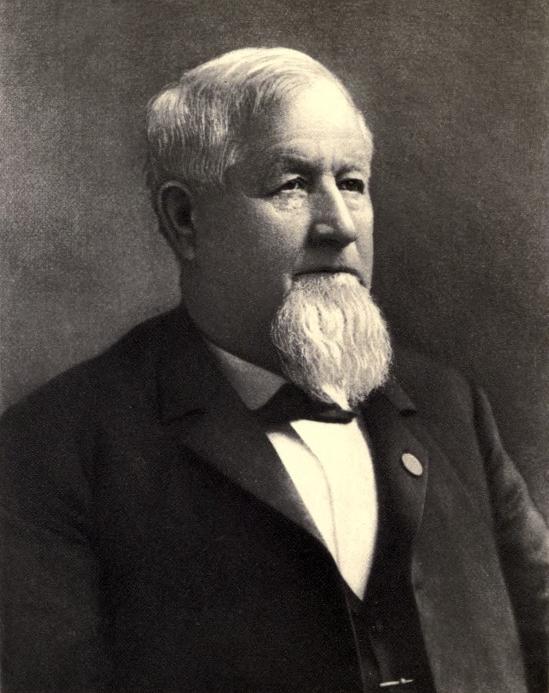

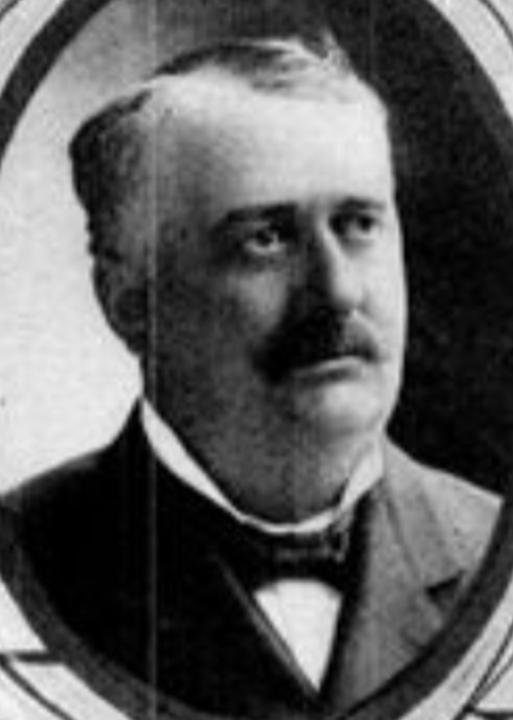

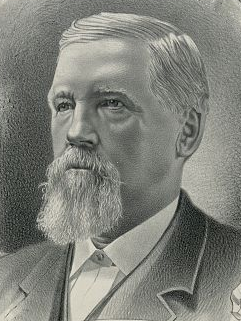
Nominee	John M. Palmer	Cicero Lindly	Alson Streeter
Party	Democratic	Republican	Alliance
Final Ballot	103	100	1
United States Senator before election
Charles B. Farwell
Republican
Elected United States Senator
John M. Palmer
Democratic

The 1891 United States Senate election in Illinois was held from January 13 to March 11, 1891. The contentious election was determined by a joint session of the Illinois General Assembly. The election went on for 154 ballots and cost the State of Illinois approximately $150,000.

== 1890 general election ==
In the 1890 general election for the Illinois Senate and Illinois House of Representatives, voters returned 101 Democrats, 100 Republicans, and 3 Farmers' Alliance candidates to the Illinois General Assembly. This placed the balance of power with the "Big Three"; the three legislators affiliated with Farmers' Alliance. They were James Cockrell, Hosea H. Moore, and Herman Taubeneck.

== Initial nominations ==
The 37th Illinois General Assembly was convened on January 7, 1891. The Republican caucus nominated Richard J. Oglesby with 48 votes on the first ballot and 64 votes on the second ballot defeating incumbent Senator Charles B. Farwell. A combination of backlash from farmers, personal grudges, and a lethargic campaign for renomination doomed Farwell's candidacy at the caucus. Oglesby had initially declined to be a candidate in March 1890 Oglesby was nominated during the House proceedings by David P. Keller of Macon County and in the Senate by George E. Bacon of Edgar County. The Democratic candidate John M. Palmer was nominated during House proceedings by Frank H. Jones of Sangamon County and in the Senate by Martin Newell of Woodford County, but faced opposition from future Illinois governor John Peter Altgeld during the primary. Alson Streeter the candidate of the Union Labor Party in the 1888 United States presidential election and choice of the Farmers' Alliance members, was nominated during House proceedings by James Cockrell of Marion County.

== Voting ==
The election was deadlocked as both the Democratic caucus and Republican caucus struggled to get the "Big Three" to support their chosen candidates. Eventually, Cockrell and Moore defected to the Democratic Party's candidate. The Republican caucus lined up unanimously behind Lindly. Herman Taubeneck remained behind Streeter.
