= Fred G. Blood =

American politician (1856–1940)

Fred G. Blood (May 4, 1856 – February 20, 1940) was a Populist member of the Illinois House of Representatives.

== Biography ==
Blood was born May 4, 1856, on a farm near Potsdam, New York. He completed coursework at State Normal school at Potsdam. In 1877, he moved to southern Illinois first to Montgomery County and then shortly after to Franklin County to be a teacher for approximately ten years. He moved to Marion to work as an organizer for Farmers' Mutual Benefit Association and was its publisher. He is considered unsuccessful in this position by historians as the F.M.B.A.'s publication The Binder declined in quality. The organization fired him and his role taken over by John Patterson Stelle and Stelle's The Progressive Farmer. After this rejection, he became involved in the National Farmers' Alliance and Industrial Union as their Illinois State Director. This organizing work took him to Mount Vernon, Illinois. He married his wife Emma, with whom he would have three children, in 1880.

A Republican until after the 1884 United States presidential election, he became an independent until he joined the People's Party. He became its nominee for Illinois Treasurer in the 1892 election. In 1893, he published an oft-cited work, the Handbook and History of the National Farmers Alliance and Industrial Union. Other involvement in the populist cause including serving as doorkeeper for the national Farmers' Alliance and as a state-level organizer for Farmers' Alliance and Industrial Union. In 1895, he was admitted to the bar and began his practice in Mount Vernon.

In the 1896 general election, Blood ran for the Illinois House of Representatives from the 46th district. The 46th district contained Franklin, Jefferson, Wayne, and Hamilton. Blood was elected to one of the three state representative positions from the district.

Blood moved to San Diego, California in 1912. He served for a time as the City Attorney for San Diego. He died February 20, 1940.
