= 1894 New York state election =

1894 New York gubernatorial election
- November 6, 1894
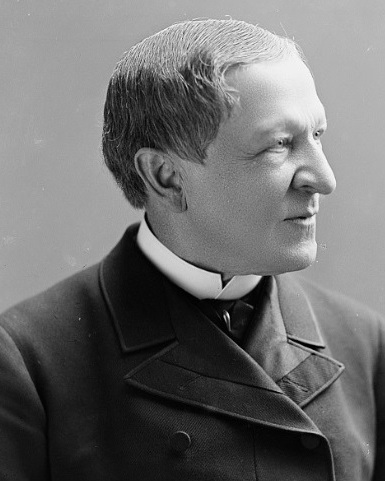

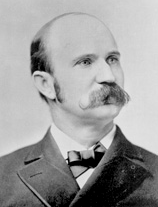
Nominee	Levi P. Morton	David B. Hill
Party	Republican	Democratic
Alliance		Empire State
Popular vote	673,818	517,710
Percentage	52.82%	40.58%
- County results Morton: 40–50% 50–60% 60–70% Hill: 40–50% 50–60%
Governor before election
Roswell Flower
Democratic
Elected Governor
Levi P. Morton
Republican

The 1894 New York state election was held on November 6, 1894, to elect the governor, the lieutenant governor and a judge of the New York Court of Appeals, as well as all members of the New York State Assembly. Besides, a new State Constitution and four other constitutional amendments were proposed to the electorate, and were all accepted. Furthermore, the inhabitants of New York County and adjacent communities were asked if they wanted to join the proposed enlarged New York City, a project known as The Consolidation.

This was the first election since 1874 where the governor was elected to a two-year term rather than a 3-year term, a practice that was used in the 1876 to 1891 elections. The term of office later expanded to 4 years following the 1938 election.

== Nominations ==
The Socialist Labor state convention met in June in Syracuse, and nominated Charles H. Matchett for Governor; William F. Steer for Lieutenant Governor; and Francis Gerau for the Court of Appeals.

The Prohibition state convention met on June 26 at Alhambra Hall in Syracuse, New York. Rev. Stanley B. Roberts, of Utica, was Temporary and Permanent Chairman. The convention met again on June 27, and nominated Francis E. Baldwin, a lawyer from Elmira, for Governor; Justus Miller, a collar-and-cuff manufacturer from Troy, for Lieutenant Governor; and Zachariah P. Taylor, of Rochester, for the Court of Appeals.

The People's Party state convention met on September 11 at the Town Hall in Saratoga Springs, New York. De Myre S. Fero was Temporary Chairman until the choice of C. R. White, of Miller's Corners, as Permanent Chairman. Charles B. Matthews, manager of the Buffalo Refining Company and arch-enemy of the Standard Oil Company", was nominated for Governor; Robert C. Hewson, of Penn Yan for Lieutenant Governor, and Thaddeus B. Wakeman for the Court of Appeals.

The Republican state convention met on September 18 at Saratoga Springs. Lemuel E. Quigg was Temporary Chairman until the choice of Warner Miller as Permanent Chairman. Former Vice President Levi P. Morton (in office 1889–1893) was nominated for Governor on the first ballot (vote: Morton 532½, J. Sloat Fassett 69, Cornelius N. Bliss 40½, Stewart L. Woodford 40, Daniel Butterfield 29, Leslie W. Russell 20, James Arkell 1). Charles T. Saxton was nominated after receiving 340 votes on the first ballot (393 votes were cast for James W. Wadsworth, George W. Aldridge, George E. Green, Arthur C. Wade, Francis Hendricks, Henry J. Coggeshall, Albert D. Shaw and Azariah C. Brundage) and a few subsequent changes. Albert Haight was nominated for the Court of Appeals on the second ballot.

The Democratic state convention met on September 26 at the Skating Rink in Saratoga Springs. U.S. Senator, and Ex-Governor, David B. Hill was Temporary and Permanent Chairman. After the McLaughlin delegates were seated from Kings County, the Anti-McLaughlin delegation, led by Edward M. Shepard, walked out of this convention. Hill for Governor, Daniel N. Lockwood for Lieutenant Governor, and William J. Gaynor for the Court of Appeals, were nominated by acclamation. Gaynor declined to run, and the Democratic State Committee met on October 6 at the Park Avenue Hotel in New York City, and substituted Charles F. Brown on the ticket.

The "Democratic Party Reform Organization" of Brooklyn, led by Edward M. Shepard, met on October 9 at Shepard's office at 111, Broadway, and nominated Everett P. Wheeler for Governor and endorsed the other two Democratic candidates. Charles S. Fairchild was chosen Chairman of the Campaign Committee.

The "State Democracy", one of the Anti-Tammany Democratic organizations in New York City, led by Ex-Mayor William R. Grace, met on October 27, at Cooper Union, and endorsed the Democratic ticket.

== Result ==
The whole Republican ticket was elected.

None of the incumbents ran for re-election.

1894 state election results
Office	Republican ticket		Democratic ticket		Democratic Reform ticket		Prohibition ticket		Socialist Labor ticket		People's ticket		Empire State Democratic ticket
Governor	Levi P. Morton	673,818	David B. Hill	517,710	Everett P. Wheeler	27,202	Francis E. Baldwin	23,525	Charles H. Matchett	15,868	Charles B. Matthews	11,049	David B. Hill
Lieutenant Governor	Charles T. Saxton	673,798	Daniel N. Lockwood	546,315	Daniel N. Lockwood		Justus Miller	23,542	William F. Steer	15,656	Robert C. Hewson	10,894	Daniel N. Lockwood
Judge of the Court of Appeals	Albert Haight	671,259	Charles F. Brown	547,334	Charles F. Brown		Zachariah P. Taylor	23,636	Francis Gerau	15,849	Thaddeus B. Wakeman	10,909	Charles F. Brown

Obs.: For candidates nominated on more than one ticket, the numbers are the total votes on all tickets.

=== Amendments ===
- The Constitution of 1894: 410,697 For and 327,402 Against
- Amendment on Legislative Apportionment: 404,335 For and 350,625 Against
- Amendment on Canal Improvement: 442,988 For and 327,645 Against
- Amendment relating to County Judges and Court of Sessions in Kings County: 391,350 For and 332,505 Against
- Amendment relating to the Election of Additional Justices of the Supreme Court: 395,233 For and 341,713 Against

=== The Consolidation ===
Manhattan, Brooklyn, Queens, Staten Island, East Chester and Pelham voted for Consolidation, Mount Vernon and Westchester rejected it, the latter by a single vote.

- New York County (Manhattan): 96,938 For and 59,959 Against
- Kings County (Brooklyn): 64,744 For and 64,467 Against
- Queens County (Queens): 7,712 For and 4,741 Against
- Richmond County (Staten Island): 5,531 For and 1,505 Against
- City of Mount Vernon: 873 For and 1,603 Against
- Town of East Chester: 374 For and 260 Against
- Town of Westchester: 620 For and 621 Against
- Town of Pelham: 251 For and 153 Against

== See also ==
- New York gubernatorial elections

== Sources ==
- The tickets: A GREAT STACK OF BALLOTS in NYT on October 22, 1894
- Result: THE STATE VOTE CANVASSED in NYT on December 15, 1894
- Result: The Tribune Almanac 1895
- Result in New York City: THE CITY'S OFFICIAL VOTE in NYT on November 24, 1894
- The Republican candidates: THE NEW STATE OFFICERS; SKETCHES OF THE REPUBLICANS ELECTED IN NEW-YORK in NYT on November 7, 1894
- The Democratic candidates: CAREERS OF CANDIDATES; THE MEN SELECTED BY THE NEW-YORK DEMOCRATIC CONVENTION in NYT on September 27, 1894
- The New York Red Book 1895
