= John W. Brown (New York politician) =

American judge

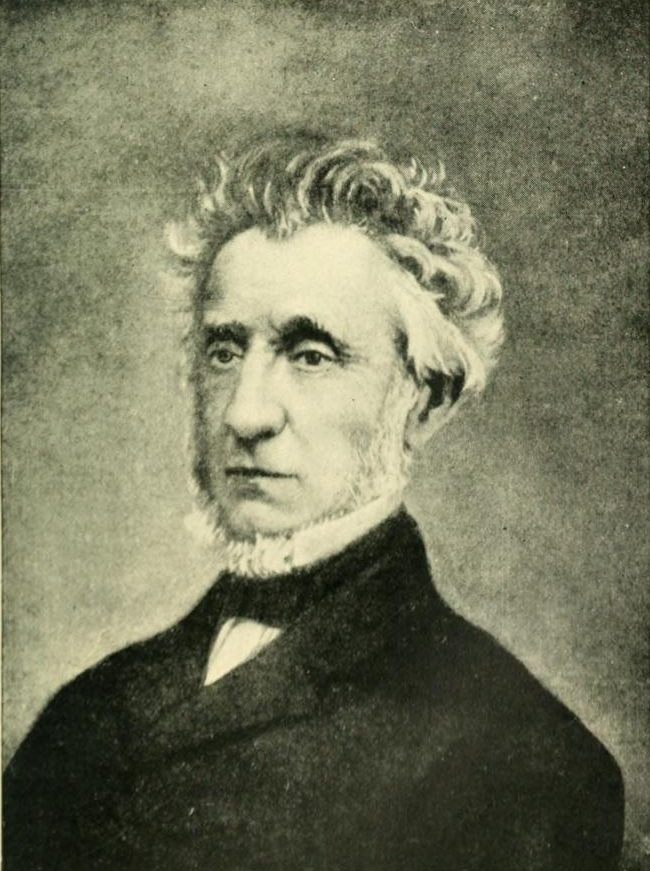

Justice of the New York Supreme Court
- In office 1849–1865

Member of the U.S. House of Representatives from New York's 6th district
- In office March 4, 1833 – March 3, 1837
- Preceded by: Samuel J. Wilkin
- Succeeded by: Nathaniel Jones

Personal details
- Born: October 11, 1796 Dundee, Scotland
- Died: September 6, 1875 (aged 78) Newburgh, New York, U.S.
- Other political affiliations: Jacksonian
- Occupation: attorney, judge

John W. Brown (October 11, 1796 – September 6, 1875), was an American lawyer and politician from New York, serving two terms in the U.S. House of Representatives from 1833 to 1837.

== Life ==
Born in Dundee, Scotland in the Kingdom of Great Britain, Brown immigrated to the United States in 1802 with his father, who settled in Newburgh, New York. He attended the public schools and later studied law. He was admitted to the bar in 1818 and commenced practice in Newburgh. He was elected a justice of the peace in 1820.

=== Congress ===
Brown was elected as a Jacksonian to the 23rd and 24th United States Congresses, and served from March 4, 1833, to March 3, 1837. Afterwards he resumed the practice of law.

=== Later career ===
He was a justice of the New York Supreme Court (2nd District) from 1850 to 1865, and was ex officio a judge of the New York Court of Appeals in 1857 and 1865. In 1865, he ran on the Democratic ticket for the Court of Appeals but was defeated by Republican Ward Hunt.

Afterwards he again resumed the practice of law.

== Family ==
Brown was the father of Charles F. Brown, who served on the New York Supreme Court.

== Death ==
He was buried in Cedar Hill Cemetery in Newburgh, New York.

== Sources ==
- United States Congress. "John W. Brown (id: B000932)". Biographical Directory of the United States Congress.
- Political Graveyard
- The New York Civil List compiled by Franklin Benjamin Hough (page 350; Weed, Parsons and Co., 1858)
- Court of Appeals judges
- Sketches of Some of the Prominent Members of the Orange County Bar, by Walter case Anthony (1917)

U.S. House of Representatives
Preceded by Samuel J. Wilkin	Member of the U.S. House of Representatives from New York's 6th congressional district 1833–1837	Succeeded by Nathaniel Jones
