= 1885 United States Senate election in New York =

The 1885 United States Senate election in New York was held on January 20, 1885, by the New York State Legislature to elect a U.S. senator (Class 3) to represent the State of New York in the United States Senate.

== Background ==
Republican Elbridge G. Lapham had been elected to this seat in a special election in 1881 to succeed Roscoe Conkling who had resigned. Lapham's term would end on March 3, 1885.

At the State election in November 1883, 19 Republicans and 13 Democrats were elected for a two-year term (1884-1885) in the State Senate. At the State election in November 1884, 73 Republicans and 55 Democrats were elected for the session of 1885 to the Assembly. The 108th New York State Legislature met from January 6 to May 22, 1885, at Albany, New York.

== Candidates ==
=== Republican caucus ===
The caucus of Republican State legislators met on January 19, President pro tempore of the State Senate Dennis McCarthy presided. 19 State senators and 73 assemblymen attended. The Evarts faction required the nomination to be made by viva voce vote, which was opposed by the Morton faction, but was carried by a vote of 64 to 28. The caucus nominated Ex-U.S. Secretary of State William M. Evarts on the first ballot.

1885 Republican caucus for United States Senator result
Office	Candidate	First ballot
U.S. Senator (Class 3)	William M. Evarts	61
	Levi P. Morton	28
	Chauncey M. Depew	3

=== Democratic caucus ===
The Democratic caucus nominated Ex-Mayor of New York Edward Cooper.

== Result ==
William M. Evarts was the choice of both the Assembly and the State Senate, and was declared elected.

1885 United States Senator election result
Office	House	Republican		Democrat	
U.S. Senator (Class 3)	State Senate (32 members)	William M. Evarts	19	Edward Cooper	13
	State Assembly (128 members)	William M. Evarts	73	Edward Cooper	52

The votes were cast on January 20, but both Houses met in a joint session on January 21 to compare nominations, and declare the result.

== Aftermath ==
Evarts served a single term, and remained in office until March 3, 1891. The seat became vacant on March 4, 1891, because Gov. David B. Hill was elected to succeed Evarts in January 1891, but Hill remained in office as Governor until December 31, 1891, and took his seat only on January 7, 1892.

== See also ==
- United States Senate elections, 1884 and 1885

== Sources ==
- "MR. EVARTS TO BE SENATOR" (PDF). The New York Times. January 20, 1885.
- "EVARTS ELECTED SENATOR" (PDF). The New York Times. January 22, 1885.
