= Cicero Lindly =

American politician and judge (1857–1926)

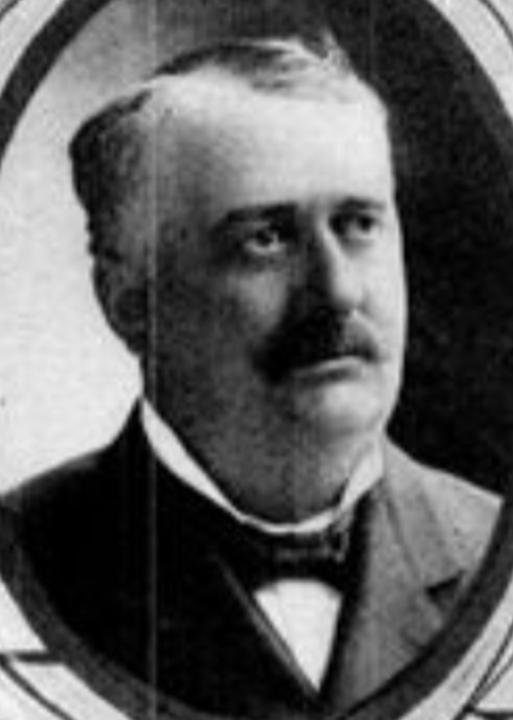
Headshot of Cicero Lindly as a State Representative

Cicero Jefferson Lindly (1857–1926) was an American politician and judge who served as a Republican member of the Illinois House of Representatives.

== Biographical sketch ==
Cicero Jefferson Lindly was born near St. Jacob, Illinois on December 11, 1857. Raised in Southern Illinois, he attended McKendree University where he eventually received a Bachelor of Laws. He was married December 22, 1880, to Alice J. McNeil, of Greenville, Illinois. That same year, Lindly purchased a section of land near Greenville and settled in Bond County. In the 1884 presidential election, Lindly was a presidential elector for Republicans James G. Blaine and John A. Logan. In 1886, Lindly was elected county judge in Bond County. Two years later, he was a delegate to the 1888 Republican National Convention. In that year's election, Landly was a staunch advocate of fellow Illinoisan Shelby Moore Cullom's candidacy for the Republican nomination until the latter dropped out and supported Benjamin Harrison.

In 1890, he was the Republican nominee for both Illinois Treasurer and a seat in the United States House of Representatives. He also became the president of the Farmers' Mutual Benefit Association. In the 1891 United States Senate election, he was a compromise candidate to try and win over the three representatives of the Farmers' Alliance. Ultimately, two of the Farmers' Alliance legislators opted for Democratic nominee John M. Palmer.

In 1897, Governor John Riley Tanner appointed Lindly to be Chairman of the Railroad and Warehouse Commission. While chairman of that commission, he was selected to be president of the National Association of Regulatory Utility Commissioners from May 1898 to February 1902. In 1900, he moved to Greenville. He served in the Illinois House of Representatives as one of three representatives from the 47th district during the 43rd, 44th, and 45th General Assemblies. In 1913 he was appointed Master in Chancery of Bond County. He was a delegate to the 1916 Republican National Convention and served for a period on the Central Committee of the Illinois Republican Party. He was elected a delegate to the 1920 Illinois Constitutional Convention from the 47th district. In 1921, Governor Len Small appointed Lindly to the Illinois Commerce Commission, a position in which Lindly would serve for the rest of his life. He died at his home in Greenville in 1926.
