= 1891 United States Senate election in Wisconsin =

- January 28, 1891
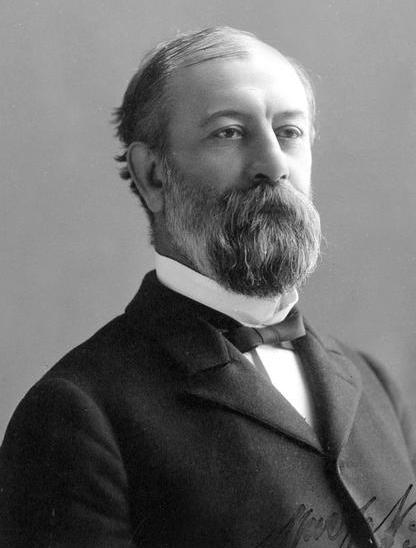

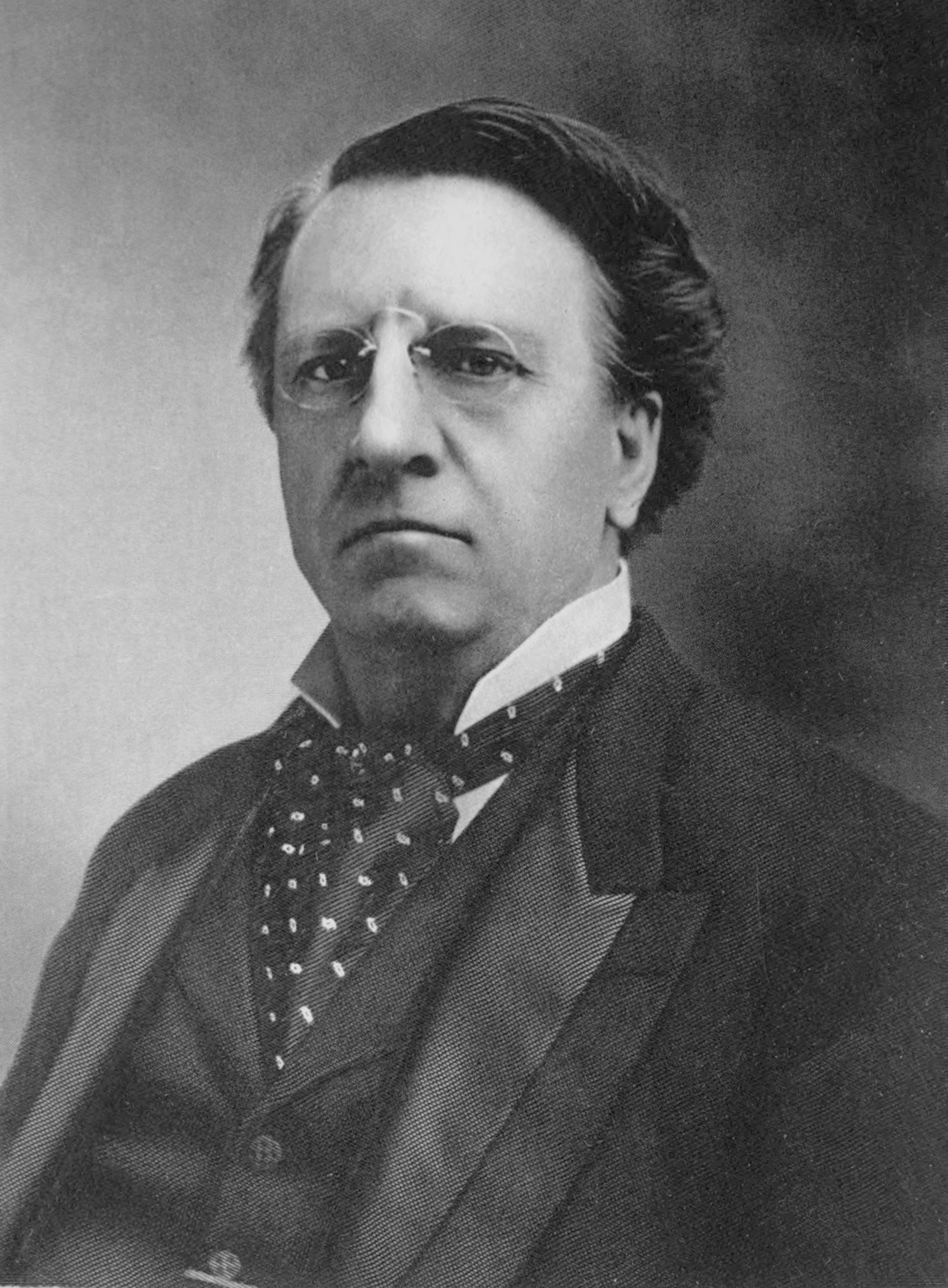
Nominee	William F. Vilas	John C. Spooner
Party	Democratic	Republican
Legislative vote	82	45
Percentage	64.57%	35.43%
U.S. senator before election
John C. Spooner
Republican
Elected U.S. Senator
William F. Vilas
Democratic

The 1891 United States Senate election in Wisconsin was held in the 40th Wisconsin Legislature on January 28, 1891. Incumbent Republican U.S. senator John C. Spooner ran for a second term, but lost the election to former U.S. postmaster general and U.S. secretary of the interior William F. Vilas.

In the 1891 term, Democrats held significant majorities in both chambers of the Wisconsin Legislature, so had more than enough votes to elect a Democratic United States senator. This was the first time the Democrats were able to elect a U.S. Senator in Wisconsin since the election of Henry Dodge in 1851.

== Major candidates ==
=== Democratic ===
- William F. Vilas, former U.S. postmaster general and former U.S. secretary of the interior.

=== Republican ===
- John Coit Spooner, incumbent U.S. senator.

== Results ==
1st Vote of the 40th Wisconsin Legislature, January 28, 1891
Party	Candidate	Votes	%
Democratic	William F. Vilas	82	64.57%
Republican	John Coit Spooner (incumbent)	45	35.43%
	Absent or not voting	6	
Majority		64	50.39%
Total votes		127	95.49%
Democratic gain from Republican			
