= Farmers' Mutual Benefit Association =

Agricultural cooperative in US

The Farmers' Mutual Benefit Association grew out of the agricultural unrest of the 1880s in the United States. Farmers who felt that they were being taken advantage of by merchants and brokers formed cooperatives for buying implements and household supplies, and storing and selling crops. Many of these cooperatives in the state of Illinois joined to form the Farmers' Mutual Benefit Association. The association grew to include local cooperatives in other Midwestern states. The association sent delegates to the Southern Farmers' Alliance convention at Ocala, Florida in December, 1890. After that, the association effectively became part of the Farmers' Alliance movement. Fred G. Blood was an organizer with the FMBA prior to his election to the Illinois House of Representatives.

== See also ==
Ocala Demands
