= David B. Hill =

American politician (1843–1910)

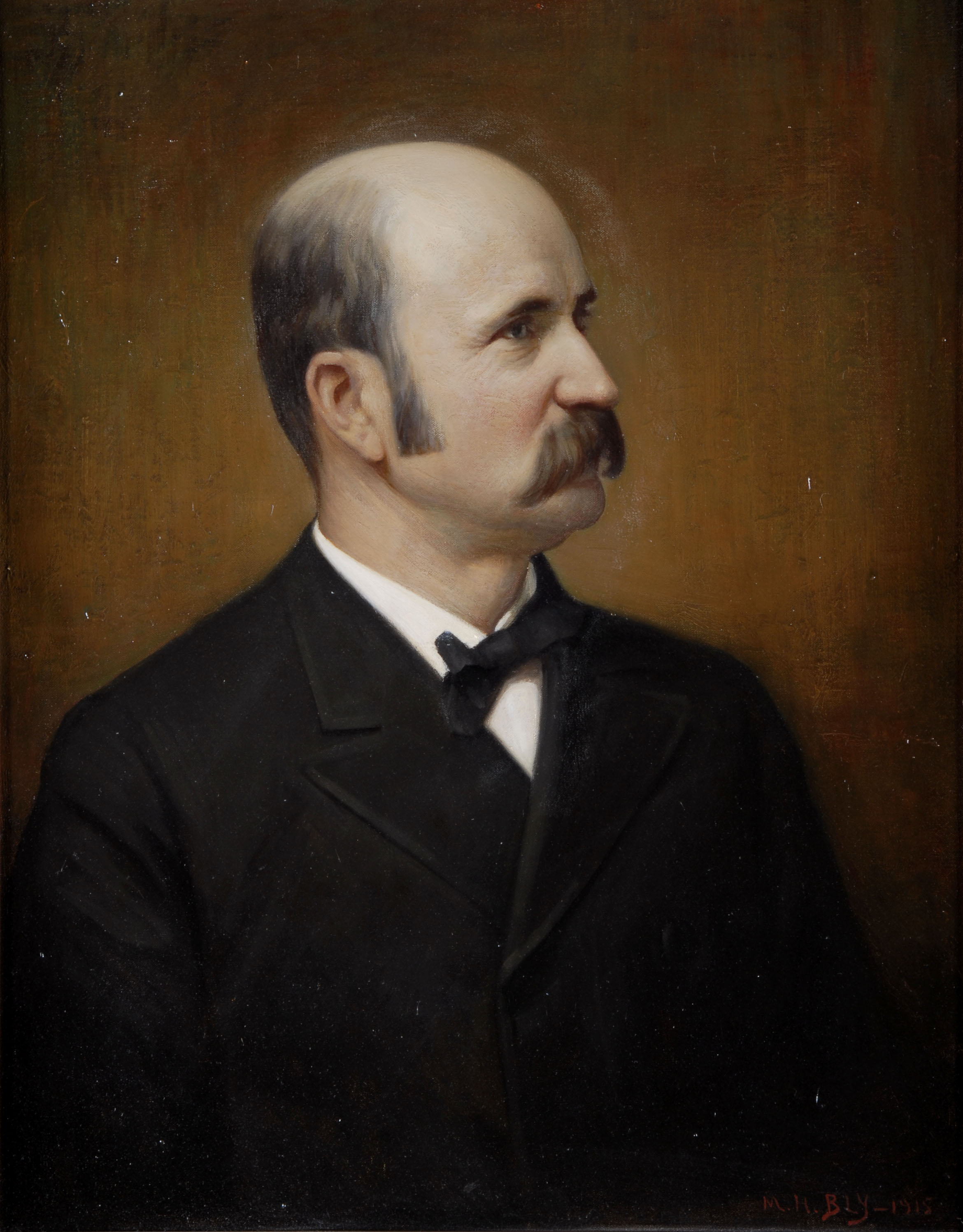
- Gubernatorial portrait of Hill

United States Senator from New York
- In office January 7, 1892 – March 3, 1897
- Preceded by: William M. Evarts
- Succeeded by: Thomas C. Platt

29th Governor of New York
- In office January 6, 1885 – December 31, 1891
- Lieutenant: Dennis McCarthy (acting); Edward F. Jones
- Preceded by: Grover Cleveland
- Succeeded by: Roswell P. Flower

Lieutenant Governor of New York
- In office January 1, 1883 – January 6, 1885
- Governor: Grover Cleveland
- Preceded by: George Gilbert Hoskins
- Succeeded by: Dennis McCarthy (acting)

13th Mayor of Elmira, New York
- In office March 8, 1882 – December 27, 1882
- Preceded by: Alexander S. Diven
- Succeeded by: Stephen T. Arnot

Member of the New York Assembly from Chemung County
- In office January 1, 1871 – December 31, 1872
- Preceded by: Edward L. Patrick
- Succeeded by: Seymour Dexter

Personal details
- Born: David Bennett Hill; August 29, 1843 Havana, New York, U.S.
- Died: October 20, 1910 (aged 67) Albany, New York, U.S.
- Party: Democratic
- Profession: Lawyer

David Bennett Hill (August 29, 1843 – October 20, 1910) was an American politician from New York. A member of the Democratic Party, he served as the 29th governor of New York from 1885 to 1891 and represented New York in the United States Senate from 1892 to 1897. In 1892, Hill made an unsuccessful bid for president on a platform of bimetallism, but lost the nomination to Grover Cleveland, his longtime political rival and former running mate.

== Early life and career ==
David B. Hill was born on August 29, 1843, in Havana, New York. He was educated locally, studied law, and began a practice in Elmira in 1864.

In 1864, he was named Elmira City Attorney.

Hill represented Chemung County in the New York State Assembly in 1871 and 1872. Hill was elected an alderman of Elmira in 1880, Mayor of Elmira in 1882, and was President of the New York State Bar Association from 1886 to 1887.

== Governor of New York ==
Hill was elected lieutenant governor in 1882, with more votes than the Democratic gubernatorial nominee, Grover Cleveland.

Hill became governor in 1885, when Cleveland resigned to take office as President of the United States. Hill won election to the office of governor in his own right in 1885 and 1888 despite Cleveland losing the state in the concurrent presidential election.

While Cleveland had publicly advocated for civil service reform, Hill embraced the role of patronage in politics and built up a strong following. During Hill's tenure as governor, the Democratic Party organization in New York polarized between those loyal to Hill and those who favored Cleveland.

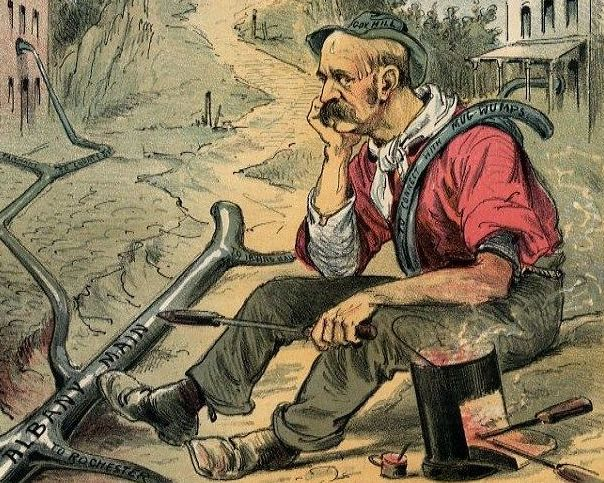
David B. Hill in 1885 cartoon "The Only Plumber Busy In The Hot Season" by Eugene Zimmerman about Mugwumps, Tammany Hall and Irving Hall

As governor, Hill opposed attempts to enact civil service reform and tax liquor. He supported regulation of tenement housing and labor reforms such as maximum work hours. Several other labor reforms were carried out during Hill's time as governor.

On May 15, 1885, Hill signed "a bill establishing a 'Forest Preserve' of 715,000 acres that was to remain permanently 'as wild forest lands.'" This tract soon became the Adirondack Park.

During his tenure as governor, William Kemmler was executed in the electric chair, the first inmate in the country ever to be put to death in this manner. On April 23, 1889, Hill vetoed a bill from the state legislature that would block the street construction at the Polo Grounds. He also vetoed two attempts at ballot reform by the Republican legislature.

== United States Senate ==
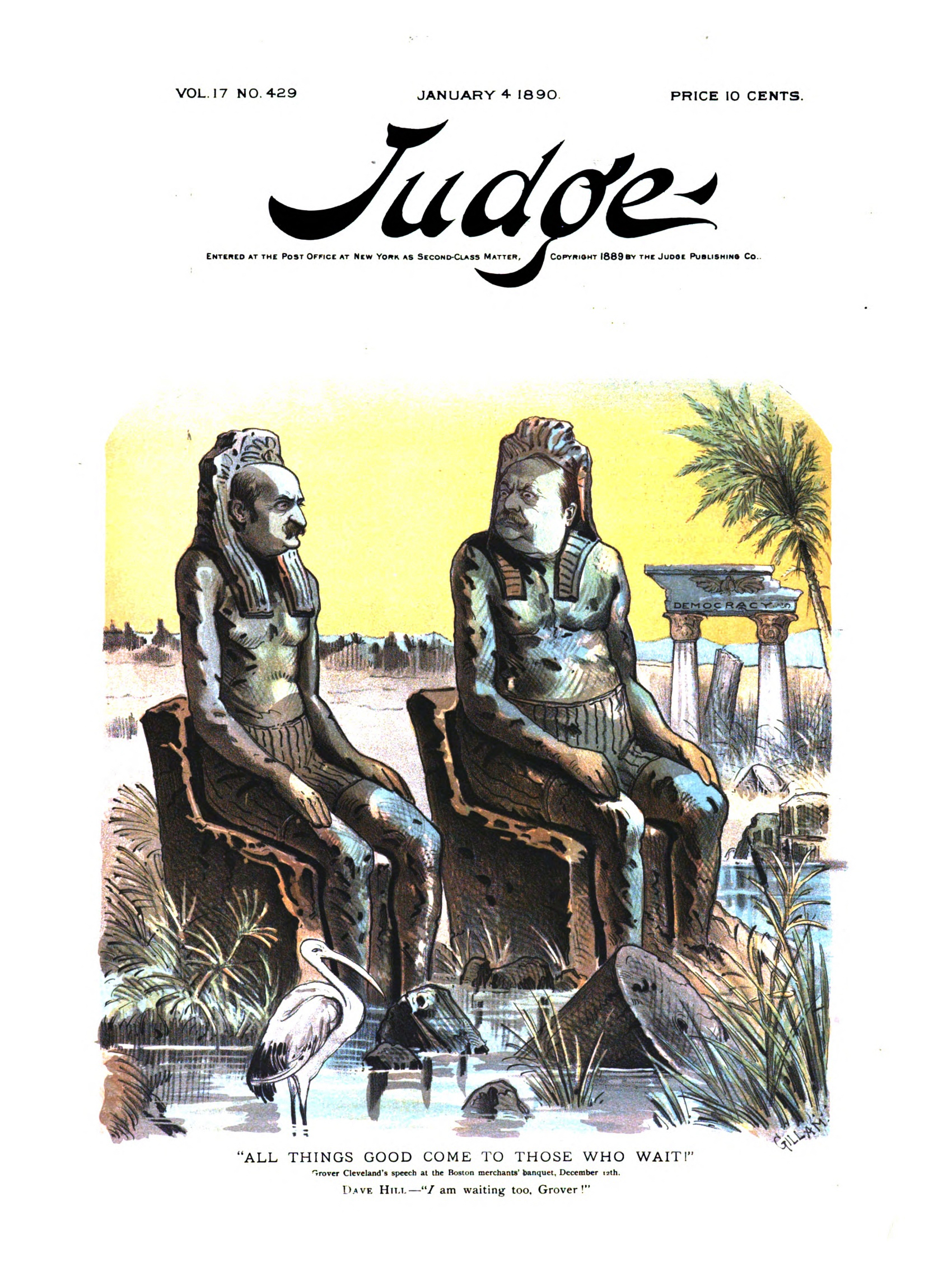
1890 political cartoon featuring Hill and Grover Cleveland

After the 1888 elections, which saw the defeat of Cleveland and the re-election of Hill, Hill established effective control over the state Democratic Party. Democratic gains in the 1890 elections gave the Democratic Party a majority in the legislature. The legislature elected Hill to the U.S. Senate. Hill was meant to take office in the U.S. Senate on March 4, 1891, but declined to resign the governorship so that Roswell P. Flower, a member of his political machine, could take the governorship.

In 1892, Hill sought the Democratic nomination for President of the United States, running as a supporter of bimetallism. At the 1892 Democratic National Convention, Cleveland defeated Hill and Governor of Iowa Horace Boies on the first ballot. Cleveland went on to defeat President Benjamin Harrison in the general election.

As Senator, Hill blocked President Cleveland's two appointments to the U.S. Supreme Court, William B. Hornblower and Wheeler H. Peckham, both New York judges who had opposed Hill's political machine.

In 1894, Hill was defeated by Republican Levi P. Morton when, as a sitting U.S. senator, he ran again for governor again.

In 1896, Hill initially opposed the nomination of William Jennings Bryan for president, but supported Bryan in the general election against the Clevelandite Gold Democrats.

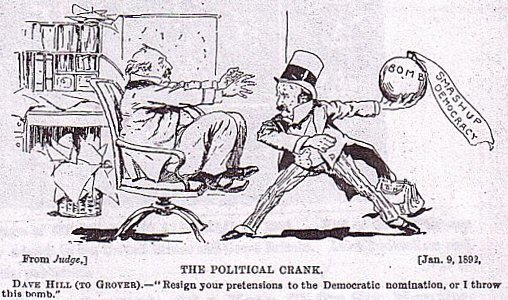
1892 editorial cartoon from Judge, depicting Hill as a threat to Grover Cleveland's presidential ambitions

In 1897, Hill was defeated for re-election by Republican Thomas C. Platt.

== Later career and death ==
Hill received significant support for the vice presidential nomination at the 1900 Democratic National Convention, but the party nominated former Vice President Adlai Stevenson I. Hill served as the campaign manager of Democratic presidential nominee Alton Parker in the 1904 presidential election.

Hill died at Wolfert's Roost, his country home near Albany on October 20, 1910, from the effects of Bright's Disease and heart disease. He was buried in Montour Cemetery in Montour Falls.

== Works cited ==
- Knoles, George (1971). The Presidential Campaign and Election of 1892. Stanford University Press. ISBN 040450969X.

Party political offices
Preceded by Grover Cleveland	Democratic nominee for Governor of New York; 1885, 1888	Succeeded by Roswell P. Flower
Preceded by Roswell P. Flower	Democratic nominee for Governor of New York; 1894	Succeeded by Wilbur F. Porter
New York State Assembly
Preceded by Edward L. Patrick	New York State Assembly; Chemung County; 1871–1872	Succeeded by Seymour Dexter
Political offices
Preceded by George Gilbert Hoskins	Lieutenant Governor of New York; 1883–1885	Succeeded by Dennis McCarthy; Acting
Preceded by Grover Cleveland	Governor of New York; 1885–1891	Succeeded by Roswell P. Flower
U.S. Senate
Preceded by William M. Evarts	U.S. senator (Class 3) from New York; 1892–1897; Served alongside: Frank Hiscock, Edward Murphy Jr.	Succeeded by Thomas C. Platt
