= John M. Palmer =

American politician (1817–1900)

John Palmer
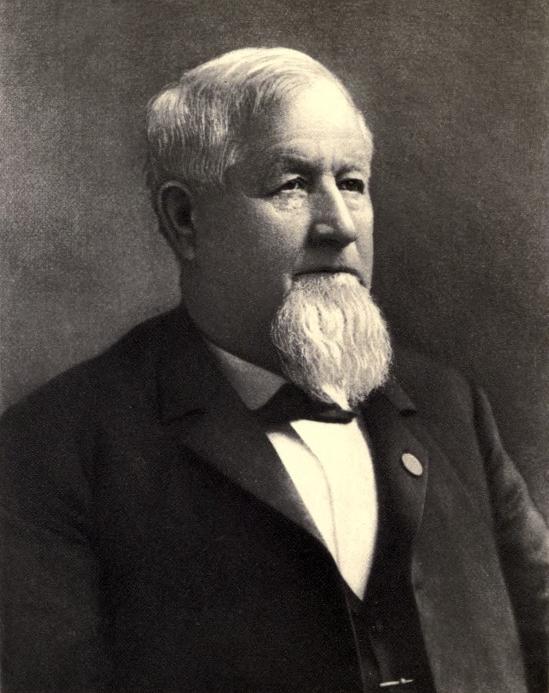
- Palmer c. 1880–1900

United States Senator from Illinois
- In office March 4, 1891 – March 3, 1897
- Preceded by: Charles B. Farwell
- Succeeded by: William E. Mason

15th Governor of Illinois
- In office January 11, 1869 – January 13, 1873
- Lieutenant: John Dougherty
- Preceded by: Richard J. Oglesby
- Succeeded by: Richard J. Oglesby

Member of the Illinois Senate
- In office 1852–1855

Personal details
- Born: John McAuley Palmer; September 13, 1817 Scott County, Kentucky, U.S.
- Died: September 25, 1900 (aged 83) Springfield, Illinois, U.S.
- Party: Democratic (before 1848, 1852–1856, 1872–1896); Free Soil (1848–1852); Republican (1856–1870); Liberal Republican (1870–1872); National Democratic (1896–1900)
- Education: Shurtleff College

Military service
- Allegiance: United States; Union
- Branch/service: United States Army; Union Army
- Years of service: 1861–1866
- Rank: Major General
- Commands: XIV Corps
- Battles/wars: American Civil War

John McAuley Palmer (September 13, 1817 – September 25, 1900) was an American politician. He was an Illinois resident, a general who fought for the Union during the American Civil War, the 15th governor of Illinois, and presidential candidate of the National Democratic Party in the 1896 election on a platform to defend the gold standard, free trade, and limited government.

Palmer switched political parties throughout his life, starting a Democrat. He became in turn an anti-Nebraska Democrat (an anti-slavery opponent of the Kansas-Nebraska Act), a Republican, a Liberal Republican, returned to being a Democrat, then ended as a Bourbon Democrat. He said, "I had my own views. I was not a slave of any party," and added, "I thought for myself and [have] spoken my own words on all occasions."

== Early life and career ==
Born at Eagle Creek in Scott County, Kentucky, Palmer's family moved to Alton, Illinois, in 1831. They were very poor, but he later worked his way through college. In 1839, he was admitted to the bar in that state. Palmer married Malinda Ann Neely in 1842 and had ten children with her. His early careers included being a lawyer, school teacher, coopering, and selling clocks.

Palmer was a member of the state constitutional convention of 1848. Between 1852 and 1855, he was a Democratic member of the Illinois Senate, but joined the Republican party upon its organization and became one of its leaders in Illinois.

He presided over the 1856 Illinois Republican Convention in Bloomington that founded the party in his home state. In 1859, he was the Republican candidate in a special election for a vacancy in the 36th Congress caused by the death of Thomas L. Harris, but he was defeated by John A. McClernand. He later became a Republican presidential elector in 1860 and was one of the leading people who got his friend Abraham Lincoln nominated for the presidency at the national convention in Chicago.

In 1861, President Lincoln appointed Palmer to be a delegate to a Peace Conference in Washington. It failed when no compromise could be reached.

== Civil War ==
During the American Civil War, Palmer served in the Union army, rising from the rank of colonel to that of major general in the volunteer service. He enlisted in 1861. He was commissioned Colonel of the 14th Illinois Infantry, serving under his friend John C. Fremont in an expedition to Springfield, Missouri, to put down the rebellion in that state. On December 20, 1861, he was promoted to brigadier general and assigned command of a brigade under John Pope.

Palmer took part in the capture of New Madrid and Island No. 10, commanding a division in the latter campaign. Taken ill in the field, he returned home to recuperate and raised a new regiment, the 122nd Illinois Infantry. Retaking the field in September, he was assigned by William S. Rosecrans (Note: The historian, Frank Varney writes of an anti-Roman Catholic bias of Palmer's leading to a disdain for Rosecrans, but it is unclear what his exact sources for this are.) to command the first division of the Army of the Mississippi in Alabama and Tennessee. On November 29, 1862, he was promoted to major general of volunteers and was conspicuous in the Battle of Stones River, where his division held a vital position within the Union lines.

Palmer effectively led his troops during the Battle of Chickamauga in September 1863. He commanded the XIV Corps of the Army of the Cumberland during the Chattanooga Campaign (November 23–November 25, 1863). He served under George Henry Thomas in the Atlanta campaign. Palmer's corps was a part of William T. Sherman's movement at the Railroads at East Point in early August 1864. His corps was placed under the command of Major General John M. Schofield and ordered to cross North Utoy Creek. He questioned his orders as he outranked Schofield as a Major General. A delay ensued while Sherman researched the question of rank, and he ruled in favor of the 33-year-old Schofield, commander of the Army of Ohio. After the main assault by the XIV and XXIII Corps in which one of his Soldiers, PVT Samual Grimshaw, received the Medal of Honor, Palmer resigned in protest on the evening of August 6, 1864, and Brigadier General Johnson assumed command of the XIV Corps. Later, Major General Jefferson C. Davis assumed command of the Corps. This is the only example of a resignation in the middle of an operation during the history of the United States. He returned home and awaited orders from the War Department. In early 1865, he was reassigned to command all Federal forces in Kentucky, helping to assert Federal control over the state for the next three years.

As Kentucky's military governor, Palmer established such control by two methods: waging a hard war against guerrillas and achieving the end of slavery in a state not bound by the Emancipation Proclamation. As late as May 1865, Palmer made clear his position on hard war after Kentucky irregulars still in the field had threatened him about summary punishment for captured partisans—"if you treat them as prisoners of war we will respect the same towards your soldiers if not we never can." Palmer ordered that guerrillas would not be allowed to surrender. "[N]o commission, real or forged, shall save [them]," he ordered, "all will be driven out or punished accordingly ... such men [will] be exterminated." Palmer, one of the organizers of the Republican Party in Illinois, was an avowed abolitionist who had received his assignment from his friend, the president, specifically to implement military policies to end slavery in the state. (When Lincoln offered the assignment in Kentucky to Palmer, then without a command, the general claimed the president directed him firmly: "Go to Kentucky, keep your temper, do as you please, and I will sustain you.") Palmer needed little convincing, believing "that all that was left of slavery [in Kentucky] was its mischiefs" and, as he related, he was "determined to 'drive the last nail in the coffin' of the 'institution' even if it cost me the command of the department." (Indeed, to his wife, he opined in 1865 that "if [I] had been asked five or ten years ago what honor I would ask as the highest which could be confer[r]ed upon me I would have said let me destroy slavery in Kentucky.") He announced as much on March 20 at one of Louisville's Methodist churches.

In the next few months, Palmer carried out Lincoln's directive with persistence, which belied the initial impression he gave the legislature that he intended to appease the state's loyal white populace. Not only did he actively enlist all able-bodied black men at an unprecedented rate—often with the assistance of all-black recruiting squads, and despite the legislature's strident objection to the continued presence of black troops in the state—he sustained martial law in the state to override the state's civil courts and governments because of their evident unwillingness to assume "their clear and positive duty to protect the people from forcible wrongs, whether inflicted under the forms of law or otherwise." He legitimated slave marriages to protect the wives and children of enlisted men (in part a response to the Camp Nelson embarrassment), established refugee camps, fended off efforts by various municipal governments to expel freedom seekers and free blacks alike and deny them the opportunity to find employment, released enslaved people from jails and workhouses, ordered that no bondman should be forced into service as substitutes, and issued tens of thousands of travel passes enabling African Americans to move freely within and without the state in search of employment. Called by African Americans "free passes" (and by white Kentuckians "Palmer passes"), they were both agents and symbols of the delayed yet inevitable death of slavery in the state. At an African American Fourth of July celebration at Louisville's camp—one that followed a parade through the city streets, including some fifteen hundred armed black and white soldiers and band—Palmer, arriving in a gilded circus chariot, told an estimated twenty thousand attendees, most of whom he had already been assured believed the general was there to declare them free (and who he claimed later he set out to inform otherwise), "My countrymen, you are free, and while I command in this department the military forces of the United States will defend your right to freedom." That one of its circuit courts was soon to strike down Congress's act of March 3, 1865, liberating black soldiers' dependents—some 72,045 individuals, or by one USCT officer's estimate, "[t]wo and one half persons freed, for each Colored Soldier enlisted in the State of Kentucky" and two-thirds of the enslaved people in the state—only fueled the general's intent to cure the state's white residents of "Negrophobia in its worst form." "Slavery is dead in Kentucky," he said to his wife in October 1865, "and my Mission is accomplished." He was soon met with an indictment by Louisville's grand jury for aiding freedom seekers and a wave of lawsuits from dispossessed Kentucky enslavers.

== Postbellum career ==
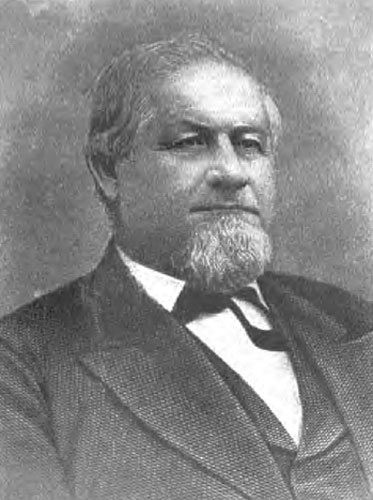
John McAuley Palmer

In 1866, he resigned from the army and two years later was elected Governor of Illinois as a candidate of the Republican Party. He succeeded fellow Republican, General Richard James Oglesby. As Governor, Palmer signed the 1872 Public Library Act, establishing tax-funded public libraries in Illinois. He also advocated for establishing reform schools for youthful offenders, deeming capital punishment "a vestige of barbarism" and believing that contact with repeat criminals at prisons would worsen their habits. Furthermore, Palmer urged ratification of the Fifteenth Amendment and supported the adoption of the 1870 Illinois State Constitution.

In the aftermath of the 1871 Chicago Fire, Palmer called for the state legislature to hold a special session on October 13, making roughly $3,000,000 available for relief. When legislators questioned the Constitutionality of providing such funds, Palmer issued a message highlighting the General Assembly's promise in an 1865 act to refund money spent by Chicago in constructing the Illinois and Michigan Canal. With interest, the expenditures amounted to $2,955,340, which would be the amount the state legislature ultimately appropriated for relief.

Amid the unrest brought on by the disaster, General Philip Sheridan visited Chicago. Without informing Palmer, the city's mayor, Roswell Mason, subsequently proclaimed on October 11 that Sheridan was in charge of maintaining order there. Palmer, who did not learn of this action until October 17, reacted negatively to Mason's decision. Believing that states should "re-assume their rightful powers" after the Civil War, Palmer argued that Mason could not request federal intervention without the Governor's consent and held that state troops had handled the situation well. As such, he told Mason to inform Sheridan that U.S. troop presence was no longer necessary, but the mayor responded by saying he would not dismiss the proclamation until October 23.

Once federal troops left Chicago, a local relief agency requested that Sheridan station four more companies in the city. Then-Commanding General of the Army William T. Sherman obliged, and Palmer appealed the decision to then-President Ulysses Grant, who defended the action on practical grounds. This incident, alongside Palmer's dislike of high protective tariffs during peacetime and his general inclination toward state sovereignty, influenced the Governor's decision to join the Liberal Republican movement in 1872.

He was succeeded in turn by Oglesby in 1873. In the presidential election of 1872, Governor Palmer received three electoral votes for vice president by electors who had voted for the Liberal Republican Party's vice presidential candidate B. Gratz Brown for president after the death of Horace Greeley. In the 1891 United States Senate election, he was elected to the U.S. Senate as a Democrat and served one term.

Mrs. Palmer Weber, the daughter of Senator Palmer, spent considerable time in Washington, D.C., during her father's senatorial term, where her beauty, grace, and friendliness made her very popular.

=== 1892 presidential possibility ===
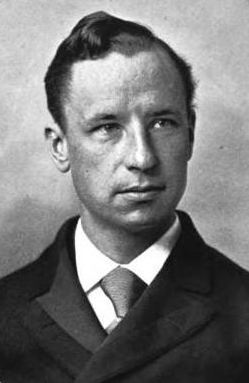
William Russell. Palmer promised to make him his running mate if Palmer won the 1892 the Democratic presidential nomination.

In the 1892 presidential election, Palmer was seriously considered as a presidential candidate. At first, Palmer was taken up as a "refuge" candidate. Some Chicago Democrats, who were not prepared to accept Cleveland, Hill, or Gorman, were to support Palmer until they could go to the winner. This in itself was a point gained by Palmer, and he proceeded to utilize it at once.

In early February 1892, Palmer had a conference with Patrick A. Collins, a former Democratic Massachusetts Congressman. At this conference, the two Democrats concluded a treaty. The purpose of the treaty was to make Palmer the Democratic presidential candidate and Massachusetts Governor William Russell, Collins' political ally and personal friend, the vice presidential candidate. Collins argued that being a Western senator of Kentucky stock, Palmer would be acceptable to the Southern Democrats. The objection to Palmer's age would be met by pointing out that Russell, the youngest of governors, would become president in the event of his death. Russell's nomination would command the support of New England Democrats.

Before the 1892 Democratic National Convention, Cook County Democrats held a convention and endorsed Senator Palmer for president. In the end, Palmer stood faithful to former president Grover Cleveland and worked to have him nominated. Even though he supported Cleveland, many Illinois Democrats still supported him for president. Palmer was such a serious candidate that he had to go to the Democratic Convention in Chicago to discourage his nomination.

However, under exceptional circumstances, he ran for president in 1896 rather than seeking reelection to the Senate.

=== Defending the gold standard ===
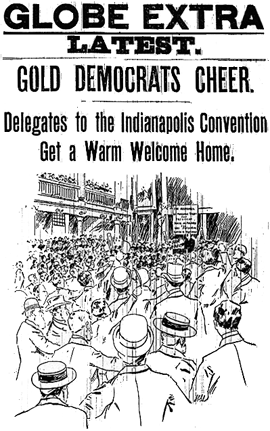
The National "Gold" Democratic Convention

Palmer was the presidential candidate for the National Democratic Party in the 1896 election. The National Democratic Party was a conservative splinter group opposed to the free-silver platform of the regular Democratic Party and its nominee, William Jennings Bryan. His running mate on this "Gold Democratic" ticket was Simon Bolivar Buckner, Sr., a former Confederate general and governor of Kentucky. The National Democratic Party ticket received the coveted endorsement of the New York Times.

The party arose out of a split in the Democratic Party due to the economic depression that occurred under Democratic president Grover Cleveland. At the 1896 presidential convention, one of Palmer's main Illinois rivals was Governor John Peter Altgeld, who succeeded in getting a candidate, former Illinoisan William Jennings Bryan, nominated for the presidency. The currency issue dominated the campaign, blurring party lines. Eastern Democrats, unable to accept the party's free-silver platform and unwilling to support McKinley for his tariff views, created a political party and nominated Palmer as their candidate at a September 1896 convention.

Palmer opposed free silver, which was a plan to place the value of silver to gold at a 16-to-1 ratio and then to tie the U.S. dollar to that value. Palmer noted that this plan ran contrary to the world market value of silver and gold, about 32 to 1. But, with Altgeld and Bryan in control of the Democratic convention, free silver won the day. Palmer believed it would have ruined the American economy, and he ran for president for a third party that was a breakaway group of Democrats. An article in the libertarian The Independent Review argues that in waging this quixotic campaign, he was a crucial figure in the "last stand" of classical liberalism as a political movement in the 19th century.

Palmer and the other founders were disenchanted Democrats who viewed the party as a means to preserve the small-government ideals of Thomas Jefferson and Grover Cleveland, which they believed had been betrayed by Bryan. In its first official statement, the executive committee of the party declared the Democrats had thought "in the ability of every individual, unassisted, if unfettered by law, to achieve his own happiness" and had upheld his "right and opportunity peaceably to pursue whatever course of conduct he would, provided such conduct deprived no other individual of the equal enjoyment of the same right and opportunity. [They] stood for freedom of speech, freedom of conscience, freedom of trade, and freedom of contract, all of which are implied by the century-old battle-cry of the Democratic party, 'Individual Liberty'". The party criticized both the inflationist policies of the Democrats and the protectionism of the Republicans.

Palmer's campaign platform was popular, and he could have been a significant factor in the election had he been younger, but few voters were willing to support a 79-year-old candidate. Although he could have made up for this with a youthful running mate, he instead chose 73-year-old Simon Bolivar Buckner, in part because it was thought that the idea of two former generals, one Union and one Confederate, teamed up would emphasize national unity and ease the still-lingering resentment in the South from the Civil War. The two displayed much energy for their age and embarked on a busy campaign schedule. Still, most supporters of the ideals of the National Democratic Party probably voted for McKinley because he supported the gold standard. Palmer and Buckner received just over 1% of the vote.

=== Post-presidential run ===
Following the conclusion of his Senate term, Palmer returned to Springfield, Illinois, resuming his law practice and writing his memoirs, The Story of an Earnest Life, with the assistance of his wife.

In 1897, Palmer, alongside former Republican State Senator John J. Brenholt, lent his legal services to Scott Bibb, Harry B. Coats, and Lee Jackson, who sought to challenge the legality of school segregation in Alton, Illinois. Although he died before the case's conclusion, Palmer was optimistic about its chances for success, with the plaintiffs reaching a favorable verdict in 1908. However, the refusal of Alton officials to implement the court's orders prevented the plaintiff's ultimate success.

Palmer died of a heart attack in Springfield, Illinois, on September 25, 1900, and was interred in the City Cemetery in Carlinville, Illinois.

John M. Palmer Elementary School, located at 5051 North Kenneth Avenue on the northwest side of Chicago, was named in his honor.

== See also ==
- List of American Civil War generals (Union)

== Notes ==
Party political offices
Preceded by Richard J. Oglesby	Republican nominee for Governor of Illinois; 1868	Succeeded by Richard J. Oglesby
Preceded by Carter Harrison Sr.	Democratic nominee for Governor of Illinois; 1888	Succeeded by John Peter Altgeld
New political party	National Democratic nominee for President of the United States; 1896	Party dissolved
Political offices
Preceded by Richard J. Oglesby	Governor of Illinois; 1869–1873	Succeeded by Richard J. Oglesby
U.S. Senate
Preceded by Charles B. Farwell	U.S. Senator (Class 3) from Illinois; 1891–1897; Served alongside: Shelby Cullom	Succeeded by William E. Mason
