= 1888 United States presidential election in Colorado =

- November 6, 1888
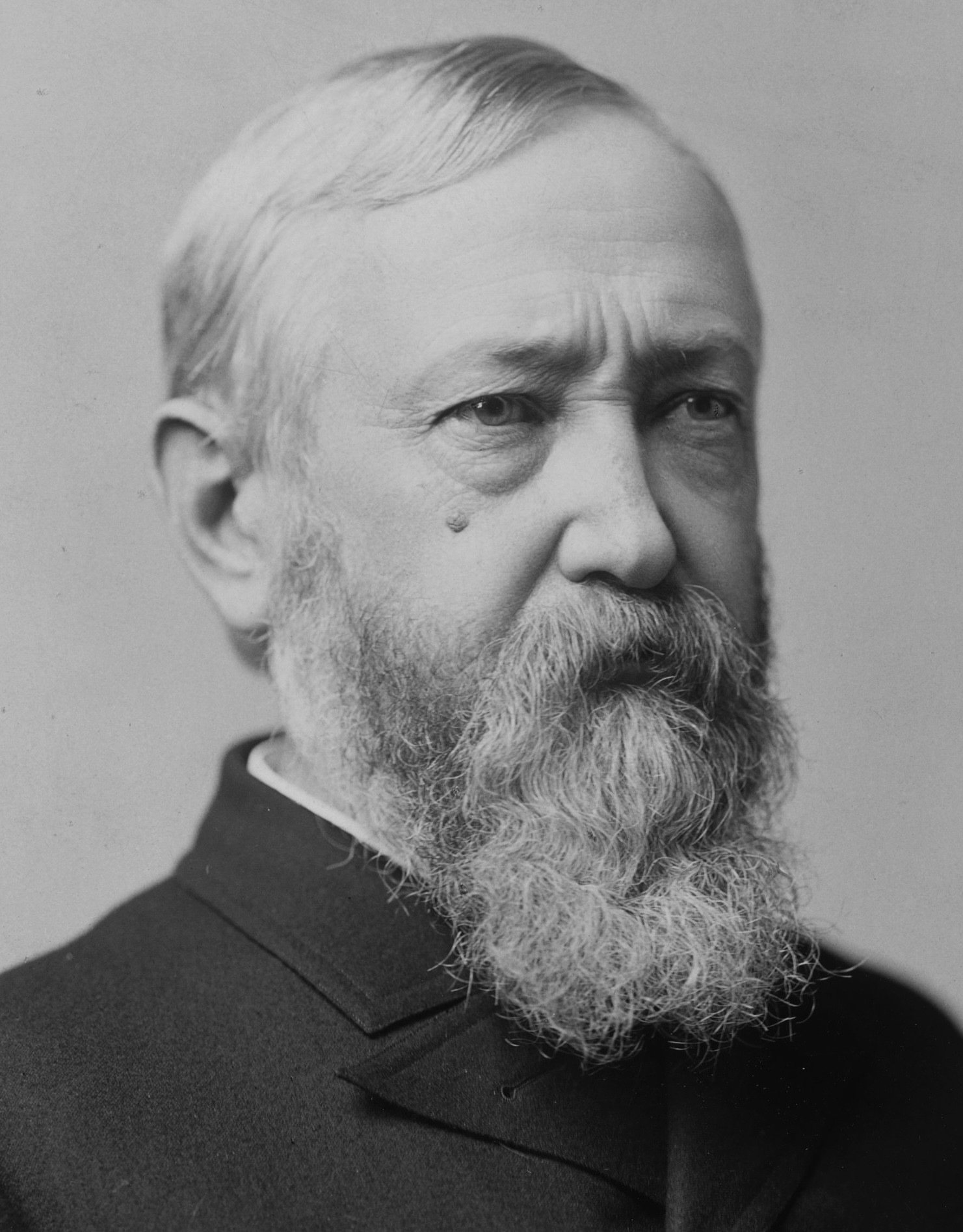

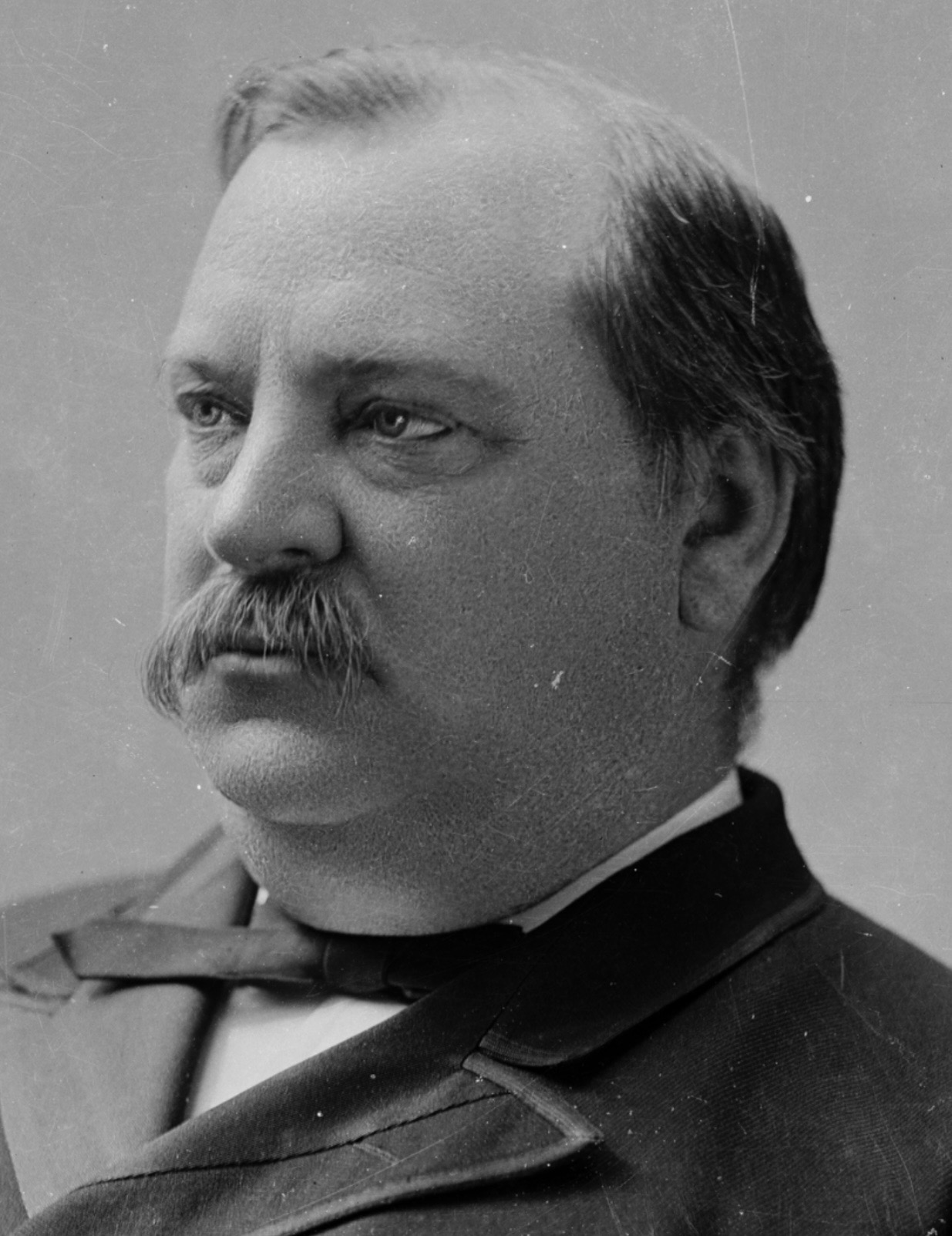
Nominee	Benjamin Harrison	Grover Cleveland
Party	Republican	Democratic
Home state	Indiana	New York
Running mate	Levi P. Morton	Allen G. Thurman
Electoral vote	3	0
Popular vote	50,772	37,549
Percentage	55.22%	40.84%
County results
Harrison
40–50%
50–60%
60–70%
Cleveland
40–50%
President before election
Grover Cleveland
Democratic
Elected President
Benjamin Harrison
Republican

The 1888 United States presidential election in Colorado took place on November 6, 1888, as part of the 1888 United States presidential election. Voters chose three representatives, or electors to the Electoral College, who voted for president and vice president.

Colorado voted for the Republican nominee, Benjamin Harrison, over the Democratic nominee, incumbent President Grover Cleveland. Harrison won the state by a margin of 14.38 points.

With 55.22 percent of the popular vote, Colorado proved to be Harrison's fifth strongest victory in terms of percentage in the popular vote after Vermont, Nevada, Maine and Kansas. This was nonetheless the last election of an era when Colorado had, like the Plains States to its east, been solidly Republican, with that party continuously controlling the legislature and holding the governorship for five of seven terms. Widespread criticism of the national party for its monetary policy in a state that was the major producer of silver in the United States and was resentful of the Northeast – where the Republican Party's power base was located – would turn the state into a Populist stronghold and then a Democratic-leaning state until after World War I.

== Results ==
1888 United States presidential election in Colorado
Party	Candidate	Running mate	Popular vote		Electoral vote	
Party	Candidate	Running mate	Count	%	Count	%
Republican	Benjamin Harrison of Indiana	Levi Parsons Morton of New York	50,772	55.22%	3	100.00%
Democratic	Grover Cleveland of New York (incumbent)	Allen Granberry Thurman of Ohio	37,549	40.84%	0	0.00%
Prohibition	Clinton Bowen Fisk of New Jersey	John Anderson Brooks of Missouri	2,182	2.37%	0	0.00%
Union Labor	Alson Jenness Streeter of Illinois	Charles E. Cunningham of Arkansas	1,266	1.38%	0	0.00%
N/A	Others	Others	177	0.19%	0	0.00%
Total			91,946	100.00%	3	100.00%

=== Results by county ===
County	Benjamin Harrison Republican		Stephen Grover Cleveland Democratic		Clinton Bowen Fisk Prohibition		Alson Jenness Streeter Union Labor		Various candidates Other parties		Margin	
County	%	#	%	#	%	#	%	#	%	#	%	#
Grand	64.80%	162	33.20%	83	0.80%	2	0.40%	1	0.80%	2	31.60%	79
Weld	57.56%	1,942	30.71%	1,036	4.86%	164	6.88%	232			26.85%	906
Clear Creek	60.62%	1,244	33.92%	696	4.68%	96	0.78%	16			26.71%	548
Rio Grande	61.52%	454	35.37%	261	2.03%	15	1.08%	8			26.15%	193
Routt	62.24%	366	37.24%	219	0.34%	2	0.00%	0	0.17%	1	25.00%	147
El Paso	60.58%	2,164	35.86%	1,281	3.53%	126	0.00%	0	0.03%	1	24.72%	883
Archuleta	62.25%	127	37.75%	77	0.00%	0	0.00%	0			24.51%	50
Larimer	58.31%	1,322	33.92%	769	6.79%	154	0.97%	22			24.39%	553
Washington	59.12%	810	36.86%	505	3.07%	42	0.95%	13			22.26%	305
Logan	57.19%	1,086	35.23%	669	5.11%	97	2.32%	44	0.16%	33	21.96%	417
Custer	60.10%	574	39.16%	374	0.63%	6	0.10%	1			20.94%	200
Eagle	59.98%	604	39.72%	400	0.30%	3	0.00%	0			20.26%	204
Conejos	59.26%	982	40.37%	669	0.30%	5	0.00%	0	0.06%	1	18.89%	313
Gunnison	55.73%	904	38.04%	617	1.11%	18	5.12%	83			17.69%	287
San Miguel	57.51%	540	40.26%	378	0.32%	3	1.70%	16	0.21%	2	17.25%	162
Saguache	57.76%	592	41.76%	428	0.49%	5	0.00%	0			16.00%	164
Fremont	49.91%	1,123	34.04%	766	4.71%	106	11.33%	255			15.87%	357
Arapahoe	56.55%	11,541	40.77%	8,320	2.18%	445	0.49%	99	0.01%	3	15.78%	3,221
Boulder	54.98%	1,639	39.45%	1,176	4.09%	122	1.41%	42	0.07%	2	15.53%	463
Hinsdale	57.66%	158	42.34%	116	0.00%	0	0.00%	0			15.33%	42
Dolores	57.61%	140	42.39%	103	0.00%	0	0.00%	0			15.23%	37
Montrose	55.65%	512	40.43%	372	2.28%	21	1.63%	15			15.22%	140
Elbert	56.89%	784	41.94%	578	1.09%	15	0.00%	0	0.07%	1	14.95%	206
Garfield	56.63%	1,110	41.84%	820	1.53%	30	0.00%	0			14.80%	290
Chaffee	56.21%	1,277	41.42%	941	2.07%	47	0.31%	7			14.79%	336
San Juan	55.21%	392	40.42%	287	0.00%	0	4.37%	31			14.79%	105
Gilpin	53.09%	953	38.33%	688	5.46%	98	3.06%	55	0.06%	1	14.76%	265
Costilla	56.46%	507	42.65%	383	0.33%	3	0.56%	5			13.81%	124
Ouray	55.29%	961	42.17%	733	0.52%	9	2.01%	35			13.12%	228
Park	56.30%	764	43.33%	588	0.37%	5	0.00%	0			12.97%	176
Summit	55.63%	701	44.21%	557	0.00%	0	0.16%	2			11.43%	144
Jefferson	52.92%	970	41.84%	767	4.91%	90	0.27%	5	0.05%	1	11.07%	203
Pitkin	54.82%	1,524	43.78%	1,217	1.22%	34	0.18%	5			11.04%	307
Douglas	52.67%	385	42.00%	307	4.92%	36	0.41%	3			10.67%	78
Bent	51.58%	1,338	41.40%	1,074	2.81%	73	4.20%	109			10.18%	264
Lake	54.01%	2,901	44.93%	2,413	1.06%	57	0.00%	0			9.09%	488
Mesa	49.49%	440	43.64%	388	6.86%	61	0.00%	0			5.85%	52
Pueblo	51.14%	2,280	45.72%	2,038	1.53%	68	1.62%	72			5.43%	242
Huerfano	51.62%	750	46.39%	674	1.86%	27	0.07%	1	0.07%	1	5.23%	76
La Plata	51.11%	849	46.60%	774	0.60%	10	1.69%	28			4.52%	75
Delta	44.01%	257	40.92%	239	3.77%	22	10.27%	60	1.03%	6	3.08%	18
Las Animas	46.85%	2,655	49.14%	2,785	1.15%	65	0.00%	0	2.86%	162	-2.29%	-130

== See also ==
- United States presidential elections in Colorado
