= 1888 United States presidential election in Kansas =

- November 6, 1888
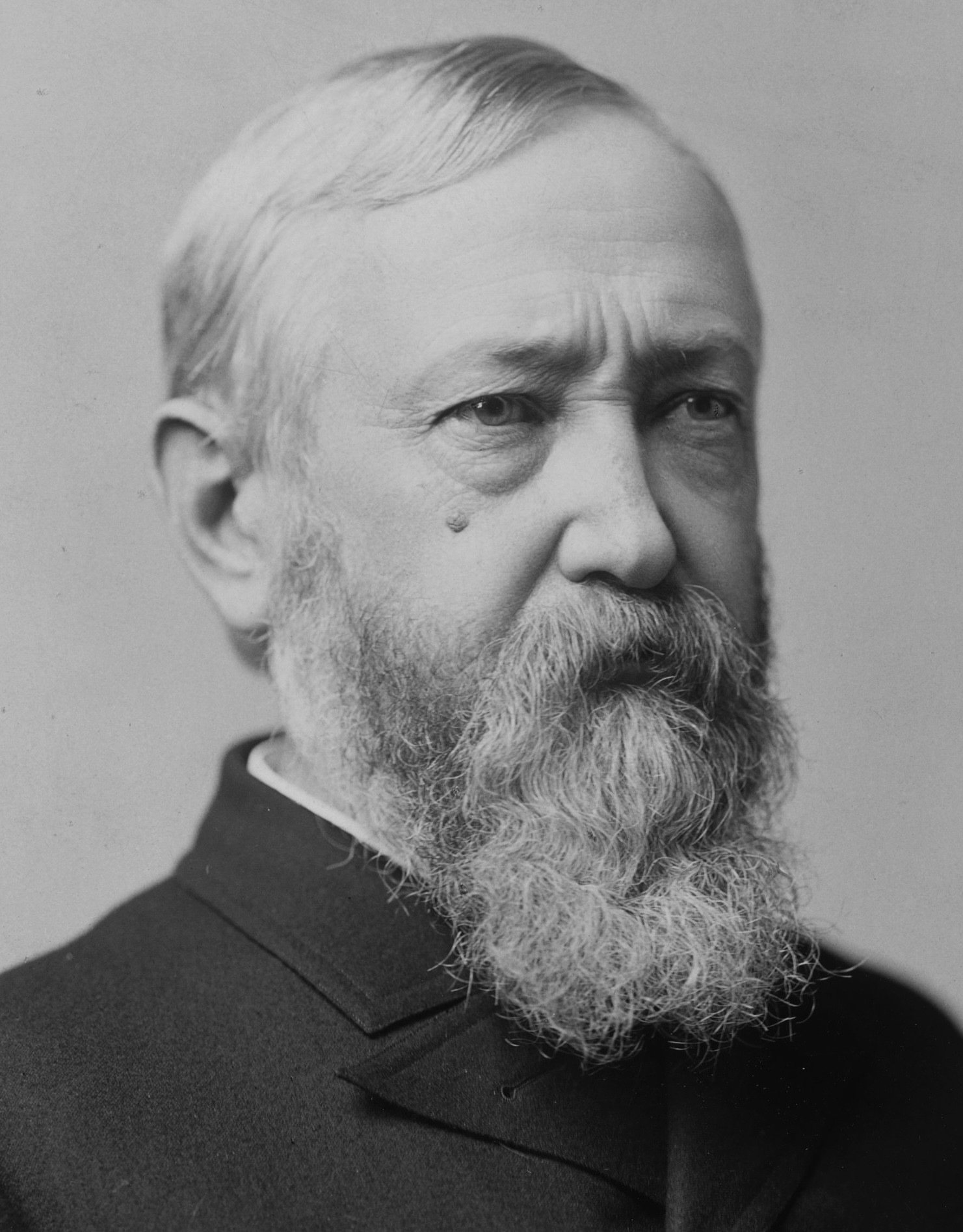

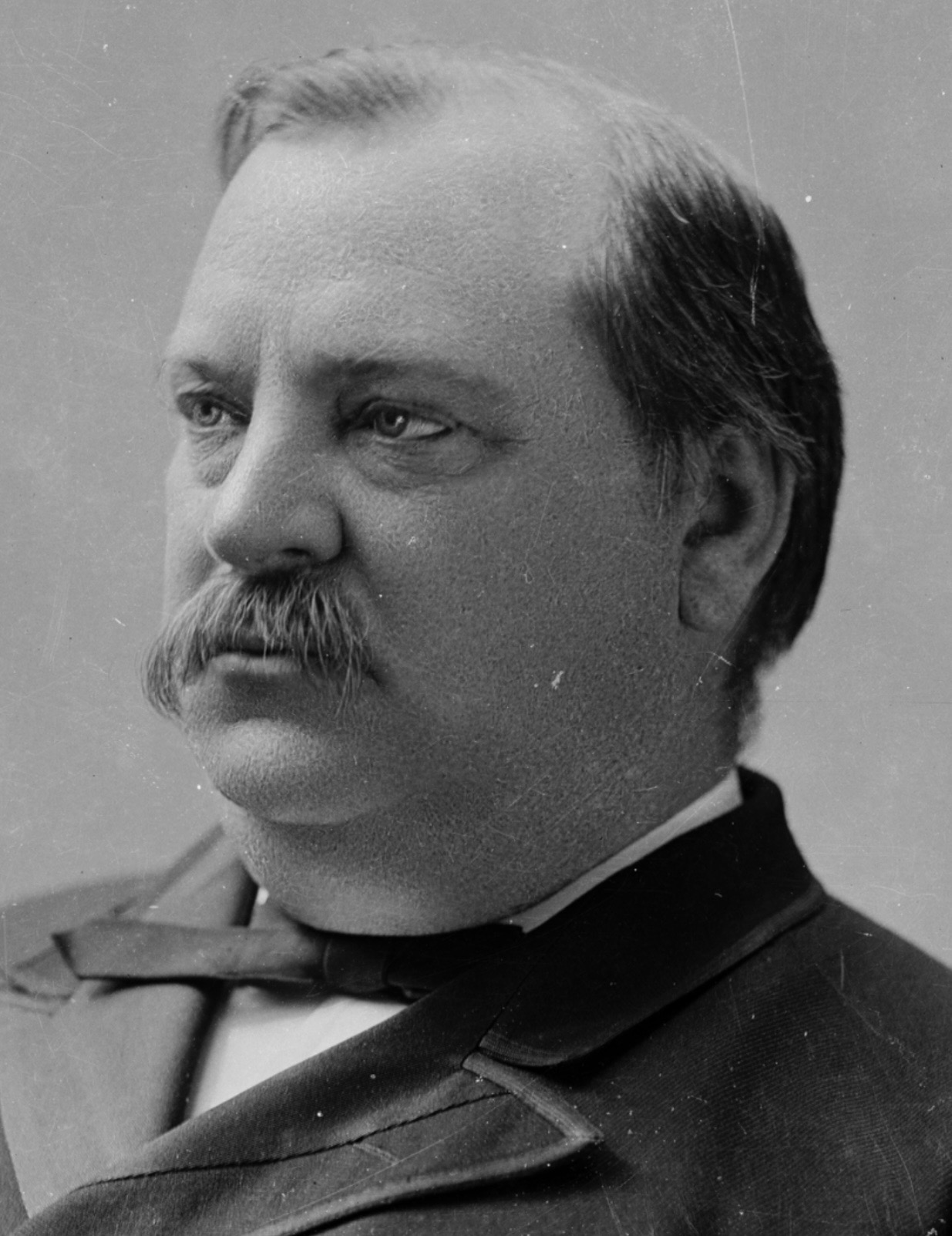

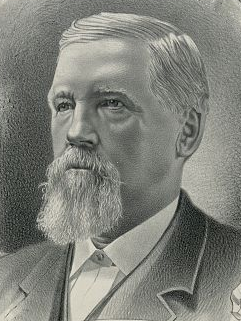
| Nominee | Benjamin Harrison | Grover Cleveland | Alson Streeter |
| Party | Republican | Democratic | Union Labor |
| Home state | Indiana | New York | Illinois |
| Running mate | Levi P. Morton | Allen G. Thurman | Charles E. Cunningham |
| Electoral vote | 9 | 0 | 0 |
| Popular vote | 182,904 | 102,745 | 37,788 |
| Percentage | 55.23% | 31.03% | 11.41% |
County results
Harrison
40–50%
50–60%
60–70%
Cleveland
40–50%
President before election
Grover Cleveland
Democratic
Elected President
Benjamin Harrison
Republican

The 1888 United States presidential election in Kansas took place on November 6, 1888, as part of the 1888 United States presidential election. Voters chose nine representatives, or electors to the Electoral College, who voted for president and vice president.

Kansas voted for the Republican nominee, Benjamin Harrison, over the Democratic nominee, incumbent President Grover Cleveland. Harrison won the state by a margin of 24.20%.

With 55.23% of the popular vote, Kansas would prove to be Harrison's fourth strongest victory in terms of percentage in the popular vote after Vermont, Nevada and Maine.

== Results ==
1888 United States presidential election in Kansas
| Party | Candidate | Running mate | Popular vote | | Electoral vote | |
| Party | Candidate | Running mate | Count | % | Count | % |
|---|---|---|---|---|---|---|
| Republican | Benjamin Harrison of Indiana | Levi Parsons Morton of New York | 182,904 | 55.23% | 9 | 100.00% |
| Democratic | Grover Cleveland of New York (incumbent) | Allen Granberry Thurman of Ohio | 102,745 | 31.03% | 0 | 0.00% |
| Union Labor | Alson Jenness Streetcar of Illinois | Charles E. Cunningham of Arkansas | 37,788 | 11.41% | 0 | 0.00% |
| Prohibition | Clinton Bowen Fisk of New Jersey | John Anderson Brooks of Missouri | 6,779 | 2.05% | 0 | 0.00% |
| N/A | Others | Others | 933 | 0.28% | 0 | 0.00% |
| Total | | | 331,149 | 100.00% | 9 | 100.00% |

=== Results by county ===
1888 United States presidential election in Kansas by county
| County | Benjamin Harrison Republican | | Stephen Grover Cleveland Democratic | | Alson Jenness Streeter Union Labor | | Clinton Bowen Fisk Prohibition | | Various candidates Write-ins | | Margin | | Total votes cast |
| County | # | % | # | % | # | % | # | % | # | % | # | % | Total votes cast |
|---|---|---|---|---|---|---|---|---|---|---|---|---|---|
| Allen | 1,886 | 56.62% | 1,036 | 31.10% | 332 | 9.97% | 77 | 2.31% | | | 850 | 25.52% | 3,331 |
| Anderson | 1,843 | 55.13% | 960 | 28.72% | 369 | 11.04% | 171 | 5.12% | | | 883 | 26.41% | 3,343 |
| Atchison | 3,219 | 52.10% | 2,603 | 42.13% | 332 | 5.37% | 25 | 0.40% | | | 616 | 9.97% | 6,179 |
| Barber | 977 | 48.80% | 710 | 35.46% | 304 | 15.18% | 11 | 0.55% | | | 267 | 13.34% | 2,002 |
| Barton | 1,353 | 49.16% | 1,228 | 44.62% | 101 | 3.67% | 70 | 2.54% | | | 125 | 4.54% | 2,752 |
| Bourbon | 3,569 | 57.07% | 1,831 | 29.28% | 805 | 12.87% | 49 | 0.78% | | | 1,738 | 27.79% | 6,254 |
| Brown | 2,696 | 55.58% | 1,803 | 37.17% | 235 | 4.84% | 117 | 2.41% | | | 893 | 18.41% | 4,851 |
| Butler | 3,172 | 55.36% | 1,616 | 28.20% | 721 | 12.58% | 221 | 3.86% | | | 1,556 | 27.16% | 5,730 |
| Chase | 1126 | 54.11% | 593 | 28.50% | 326 | 15.67% | 36 | 1.73% | | | 533 | 25.61% | 2,081 |
| Chautauqua | 1,590 | 57.57% | 694 | 25.13% | 466 | 16.87% | 12 | 0.43% | | | 896 | 32.44% | 2,762 |
| Cherokee | 2,935 | 45.62% | 2,038 | 31.68% | 1,269 | 19.72% | 192 | 2.98% | | | 897 | 13.94% | 6,434 |
| Cheyenne | 779 | 63.08% | 420 | 34.01% | 22 | 1.78% | 14 | 1.13% | | | 359 | 29.07% | 1,235 |
| Clark | 473 | 51.30% | 349 | 37.85% | 98 | 10.63% | 2 | 0.22% | | | 124 | 13.45% | 922 |
| Clay | 1,914 | 50.80% | 920 | 24.42% | 794 | 21.07% | 140 | 3.72% | | | 994 | 26.38% | 3,768 |
| Cloud | 2,542 | 59.55% | 1,052 | 24.64% | 557 | 13.05% | 118 | 2.76% | | | 1,490 | 34.90% | 4,269 |
| Coffey | 1,970 | 52.59% | 1,227 | 32.75% | 440 | 11.75% | 109 | 2.91% | | | 743 | 19.83% | 3,746 |
| Comanche | 490 | 50.67% | 384 | 39.71% | 93 | 9.62% | 0 | 0.00% | | | 106 | 10.96% | 967 |
| Cowley | 4,112 | 53.41% | 1,933 | 25.11% | 1,533 | 19.91% | 120 | 1.56% | 1 | 0.01% | 2,179 | 28.30% | 7,699 |
| Crawford | 3,156 | 48.46% | 1,875 | 28.79% | 1,362 | 20.91% | 120 | 1.84% | | | 1,281 | 19.67% | 6,513 |
| Decatur | 1224 | 57.17% | 731 | 34.14% | 140 | 6.54% | 46 | 2.15% | | | 493 | 23.03% | 2,141 |
| Dickinson | 2,746 | 54.15% | 1,695 | 33.43% | 473 | 9.33% | 157 | 3.10% | | | 1,051 | 20.73% | 5,071 |
| Doniphan | 2,245 | 66.52% | 1,109 | 32.86% | 14 | 0.41% | 7 | 0.21% | | | 1,136 | 33.66% | 3,375 |
| Douglas | 3,189 | 60.02% | 1,669 | 31.41% | 217 | 4.08% | 238 | 4.48% | | | 1,520 | 28.61% | 5,313 |
| Edwards | 541 | 53.62% | 334 | 33.10% | 114 | 11.30% | 20 | 1.98% | | | 207 | 20.52% | 1,009 |
| Elk | 1,566 | 53.70% | 696 | 23.87% | 600 | 20.58% | 50 | 1.71% | 4 | 0.14% | 870 | 29.84% | 2,916 |
| Ellis | 690 | 44.43% | 756 | 48.68% | 105 | 6.76% | 2 | 0.13% | | | -66 | -4.25% | 1,553 |
| Ellsworth | 1,159 | 56.51% | 831 | 40.52% | 39 | 1.90% | 22 | 1.07% | | | 328 | 15.99% | 2,051 |
| Finney | 694 | 62.86% | 348 | 31.52% | 51 | 4.62% | 11 | 1.00% | | | 346 | 31.34% | 1,104 |
| Ford | 882 | 52.47% | 630 | 37.48% | 119 | 7.08% | 50 | 2.97% | | | 252 | 14.99% | 1,681 |
| Franklin | 2,422 | 50.47% | 1,113 | 23.19% | 1,056 | 22.00% | 208 | 4.33% | | | 1,309 | 27.28% | 4,799 |
| Garfield | 225 | 62.15% | 129 | 35.64% | 3 | 0.83% | 5 | 1.38% | | | 96 | 26.52% | 362 |
| Geary | 1027 | 54.31% | 756 | 39.98% | 98 | 5.18% | 10 | 0.53% | | | 271 | 14.33% | 1,891 |
| Gove | 586 | 65.84% | 278 | 31.24% | 7 | 0.79% | 19 | 2.13% | | | 308 | 34.61% | 890 |
| Graham | 797 | 49.35% | 342 | 21.18% | 245 | 15.17% | 4 | 0.25% | 227 | 14.06% | 455 | 28.17% | 1,615 |
| Grant | 390 | 50.45% | 245 | 31.69% | 51 | 6.60% | 6 | 0.78% | 81 | 10.48% | 145 | 18.76% | 773 |
| Gray | 417 | 53.81% | 268 | 34.58% | 48 | 6.19% | 33 | 4.26% | 9 | 1.16% | 149 | 19.23% | 775 |
| Greeley | 422 | 59.02% | 180 | 25.17% | 105 | 14.69% | 8 | 1.12% | | | 242 | 33.85% | 715 |
| Greenwood | 2,242 | 56.89% | 1,110 | 28.17% | 542 | 13.75% | 47 | 1.19% | | | 1,132 | 28.72% | 3,941 |
| Hamilton | 480 | 59.11% | 295 | 36.33% | 28 | 3.45% | 9 | 1.11% | | | 185 | 22.78% | 812 |
| Harper | 1,490 | 48.79% | 940 | 30.78% | 587 | 19.22% | 37 | 1.21% | | | 550 | 18.01% | 3,054 |
| Harvey | 2,145 | 54.25% | 1,065 | 26.93% | 676 | 17.10% | 68 | 1.72% | | | 1,080 | 27.31% | 3,954 |
| Haskell | 291 | 55.01% | 197 | 37.24% | 21 | 3.97% | 0 | 0.00% | 20 | 3.78% | 94 | 17.77% | 529 |
| Hodgeman | 563 | 63.98% | 220 | 25.00% | 83 | 9.43% | 14 | 1.59% | | | 343 | 38.98% | 880 |
| Jackson | 1,979 | 59.90% | 1,220 | 36.92% | 13 | 0.39% | 92 | 2.78% | | | 759 | 22.97% | 3,304 |
| Jefferson | 2,268 | 57.00% | 1,601 | 40.24% | 11 | 0.28% | 99 | 2.49% | | | 667 | 16.76% | 3,979 |
| Jewell | 2,285 | 54.81% | 999 | 23.96% | 757 | 18.16% | 128 | 3.07% | | | 1,286 | 30.85% | 4,169 |
| Johnson | 2,164 | 53.13% | 1,435 | 35.23% | 303 | 7.44% | 171 | 4.20% | | | 729 | 17.90% | 4,073 |
| Kearny | 367 | 59.39% | 248 | 40.13% | 1 | 0.16% | 2 | 0.32% | | | 119 | 19.26% | 618 |
| Kingman | 1,413 | 50.16% | 622 | 22.08% | 756 | 26.84% | 24 | 0.85% | 2 | 0.07% | 657 (Note: In this county where Streeter finished second behind Harrison but ahead of Cleveland, margin given is Harrison vote minus Streeter vote and percentage margin Harrison percentage minus Streeter percentage.) | 23.32% | 2,817 |
| Kiowa | 525 | 50.34% | 381 | 36.53% | 107 | 10.26% | 30 | 2.88% | | | 144 | 13.81% | 1,043 |
| Labette | 2,870 | 47.38% | 976 | 16.11% | 2,125 | 35.08% | 85 | 1.40% | 1 | 0.02% | 745 | 12.30% | 6,057 |
| Lane | 459 | 57.74% | 267 | 33.58% | 49 | 6.16% | 20 | 2.52% | | | 192 | 24.15% | 795 |
| Leavenworth | 3,272 | 45.48% | 3,516 | 48.87% | 335 | 4.66% | 71 | 0.99% | | | -244 | -3.39% | 7,194 |
| Lincoln | 1069 | 50.19% | 617 | 28.97% | 349 | 16.38% | 59 | 2.77% | 36 | 1.69% | 452 | 21.22% | 2,130 |
| Linn | 2,166 | 52.51% | 802 | 19.44% | 1,119 | 27.13% | 38 | 0.92% | | | 1,047 | 25.38% | 4,125 |
| Logan | 609 | 65.84% | 283 | 30.59% | 33 | 3.57% | 0 | 0.00% | | | 326 | 35.24% | 925 |
| Lyon | 3,014 | 60.10% | 1,377 | 27.46% | 469 | 9.35% | 155 | 3.09% | | | 1,637 | 32.64% | 5,015 |
| Marion | 2,375 | 60.16% | 1,283 | 32.50% | 219 | 5.55% | 71 | 1.80% | | | 1,092 | 27.66% | 3,948 |
| Marshall | 2,547 | 48.33% | 1,815 | 34.44% | 835 | 15.84% | 73 | 1.39% | | | 732 | 13.89% | 5,270 |
| McPherson | 2,279 | 51.70% | 829 | 18.81% | 1,181 | 26.79% | 119 | 2.70% | | | 1,098 | 24.91% | 4,408 |
| Meade | 578 | 56.78% | 342 | 33.60% | 91 | 8.94% | 7 | 0.69% | | | 236 | 23.18% | 1,018 |
| Miami | 2,170 | 51.30% | 1,600 | 37.83% | 360 | 8.51% | 100 | 2.36% | | | 570 | 13.48% | 4,230 |
| Mitchell | 1,676 | 55.90% | 880 | 29.35% | 337 | 11.24% | 105 | 3.50% | | | 796 | 26.55% | 2,998 |
| Montgomery | 2,871 | 52.43% | 1,863 | 34.02% | 709 | 12.95% | 33 | 0.60% | | | 1,008 | 18.41% | 5,476 |
| Morris | 1,612 | 58.72% | 840 | 30.60% | 258 | 9.40% | 35 | 1.28% | | | 772 | 28.12% | 2,745 |
| Morton | 333 | 58.01% | 205 | 35.71% | 29 | 5.05% | 7 | 1.22% | | | 128 | 22.30% | 574 |
| Nemaha | 2,515 | 56.54% | 1,682 | 37.81% | 81 | 1.82% | 93 | 2.09% | 77 | 1.73% | 833 | 18.73% | 4,448 |
| Neosho | 2,134 | 49.66% | 1,144 | 26.62% | 982 | 22.85% | 37 | 0.86% | | | 990 | 23.04% | 4,297 |
| Ness | 891 | 57.26% | 470 | 30.21% | 124 | 7.97% | 71 | 4.56% | | | 421 | 27.06% | 1,556 |
| Norton | 1,471 | 56.60% | 631 | 24.28% | 466 | 17.93% | 31 | 1.19% | | | 840 | 32.32% | 2,599 |
| Osage | 3,442 | 57.49% | 1,380 | 23.05% | 1,001 | 16.72% | 164 | 2.74% | | | 2,062 | 34.44% | 5,987 |
| Osborne | 1,680 | 64.62% | 686 | 26.38% | 183 | 7.04% | 45 | 1.73% | 6 | 0.23% | 994 | 38.23% | 2,600 |
| Ottawa | 1,569 | 56.08% | 769 | 27.48% | 366 | 13.08% | 94 | 3.36% | | | 800 | 28.59% | 2,798 |
| Pawnee | 895 | 61.94% | 303 | 20.97% | 209 | 14.46% | 38 | 2.63% | | | 592 | 40.97% | 1,445 |
| Phillips | 1,681 | 53.86% | 763 | 24.45% | 592 | 18.97% | 35 | 1.12% | 50 | 1.60% | 918 | 29.41% | 3,121 |
| Pottawatomie | 2,419 | 58.94% | 1,471 | 35.84% | 162 | 3.95% | 52 | 1.27% | | | 948 | 23.10% | 4,104 |
| Pratt | 1115 | 50.18% | 652 | 29.34% | 370 | 16.65% | 85 | 3.83% | | | 463 | 20.84% | 2,222 |
| Rawlins | 1023 | 57.31% | 633 | 35.46% | 127 | 7.11% | 2 | 0.11% | | | 390 | 21.85% | 1,785 |
| Reno | 3,398 | 56.61% | 1,841 | 30.67% | 366 | 6.10% | 158 | 2.63% | 239 | 3.98% | 1,557 | 25.94% | 6,002 |
| Republic | 2,595 | 63.77% | 1,205 | 29.61% | 110 | 2.70% | 159 | 3.91% | | | 1,390 | 34.16% | 4,069 |
| Rice | 1,851 | 57.79% | 934 | 29.16% | 284 | 8.87% | 134 | 4.18% | | | 917 | 28.63% | 3,203 |
| Riley | 1,856 | 62.49% | 772 | 25.99% | 285 | 9.60% | 56 | 1.89% | 1 | 0.03% | 1,084 | 36.50% | 2,970 |
| Rooks | 1112 | 58.31% | 412 | 21.60% | 350 | 18.35% | 33 | 1.73% | | | 700 | 36.71% | 1,907 |
| Rush | 681 | 58.71% | 424 | 36.55% | 26 | 2.24% | 29 | 2.50% | | | 257 | 22.16% | 1,160 |
| Russell | 953 | 60.82% | 571 | 36.44% | 24 | 1.53% | 15 | 0.96% | 4 | 0.26% | 382 | 24.38% | 1,567 |
| Saline | 2,263 | 57.97% | 1,186 | 30.38% | 329 | 8.43% | 126 | 3.23% | | | 1,077 | 27.59% | 3,904 |
| Scott | 294 | 54.65% | 182 | 33.83% | 49 | 9.11% | 13 | 2.42% | | | 112 | 20.82% | 538 |
| Sedgwick | 6,071 | 55.51% | 4,025 | 36.80% | 618 | 5.65% | 223 | 2.04% | | | 2,046 | 18.71% | 10,937 |
| Seward | 400 | 61.16% | 207 | 31.65% | 43 | 6.57% | 4 | 0.61% | | | 193 | 29.51% | 654 |
| Shawnee | 7,672 | 68.48% | 3,143 | 28.05% | 117 | 1.04% | 271 | 2.42% | | | 4,529 | 40.43% | 11,203 |
| Sheridan | 623 | 61.99% | 337 | 33.53% | 37 | 3.68% | 8 | 0.80% | | | 286 | 28.46% | 1,005 |
| Sherman | 803 | 55.69% | 481 | 33.36% | 146 | 10.12% | 12 | 0.83% | | | 322 | 22.33% | 1,442 |
| Smith | 1,726 | 51.71% | 777 | 23.28% | 699 | 20.94% | 71 | 2.13% | 65 | 1.95% | 949 | 28.43% | 3,338 |
| Stafford | 975 | 47.51% | 483 | 23.54% | 505 | 24.61% | 89 | 4.34% | | | 470 | 22.90% | 2,052 |
| Stanton | 298 | 52.84% | 197 | 34.93% | 41 | 7.27% | 3 | 0.53% | 25 | 4.43% | 101 | 17.91% | 564 |
| Stevens | 307 | 40.99% | 268 | 35.78% | 61 | 8.14% | 21 | 2.80% | 92 | 12.28% | 39 | 5.21% | 749 |
| Sumner | 3,499 | 49.72% | 2,139 | 30.39% | 1,301 | 18.49% | 99 | 1.41% | | | 1,360 | 19.32% | 7,038 |
| Thomas | 751 | 55.02% | 486 | 35.60% | 121 | 8.86% | 6 | 0.44% | 1 | 0.07% | 265 | 19.41% | 1,365 |
| Trego | 477 | 63.86% | 220 | 29.45% | 25 | 3.35% | 24 | 3.21% | 1 | 0.13% | 257 | 34.40% | 747 |
| Wabaunsee | 1,708 | 62.43% | 960 | 35.09% | 35 | 1.28% | 33 | 1.21% | | | 748 | 27.34% | 2,736 |
| Wallace | 412 | 65.50% | 198 | 31.48% | 14 | 2.23% | 5 | 0.79% | | | 214 | 34.02% | 629 |
| Washington | 2,999 | 62.28% | 1,511 | 31.38% | 260 | 5.40% | 45 | 0.93% | | | 1,488 | 30.90% | 4,815 |
| Wichita | 438 | 59.35% | 207 | 28.05% | 78 | 10.57% | 15 | 2.03% | | | 231 | 31.30% | 738 |
| Wilson | 2,191 | 55.48% | 1,035 | 26.21% | 671 | 16.99% | 47 | 1.19% | 5 | 0.13% | 1,156 | 29.27% | 3,949 |
| Woodson | 1,149 | 51.97% | 595 | 26.91% | 363 | 16.42% | 104 | 4.70% | | | 554 | 25.06% | 2,211 |
| Wyandotte | 5,430 | 55.41% | 4,155 | 42.40% | 190 | 1.94% | 25 | 0.26% | | | 1,275 | 13.01% | 9,800 |
| Totals | 182,903 | 55.29% | 102,745 | 31.06% | 37,506 | 11.34% | 6,697 | 2.02% | 947 | 0.29% | 80,158 | 24.23% | 330,798 |

== See also ==
- United States presidential elections in Kansas
