= 1888 United States presidential election in North Carolina =

- November 6, 1888
- Turnout: 20.40% of the total population ▲1.24 pp
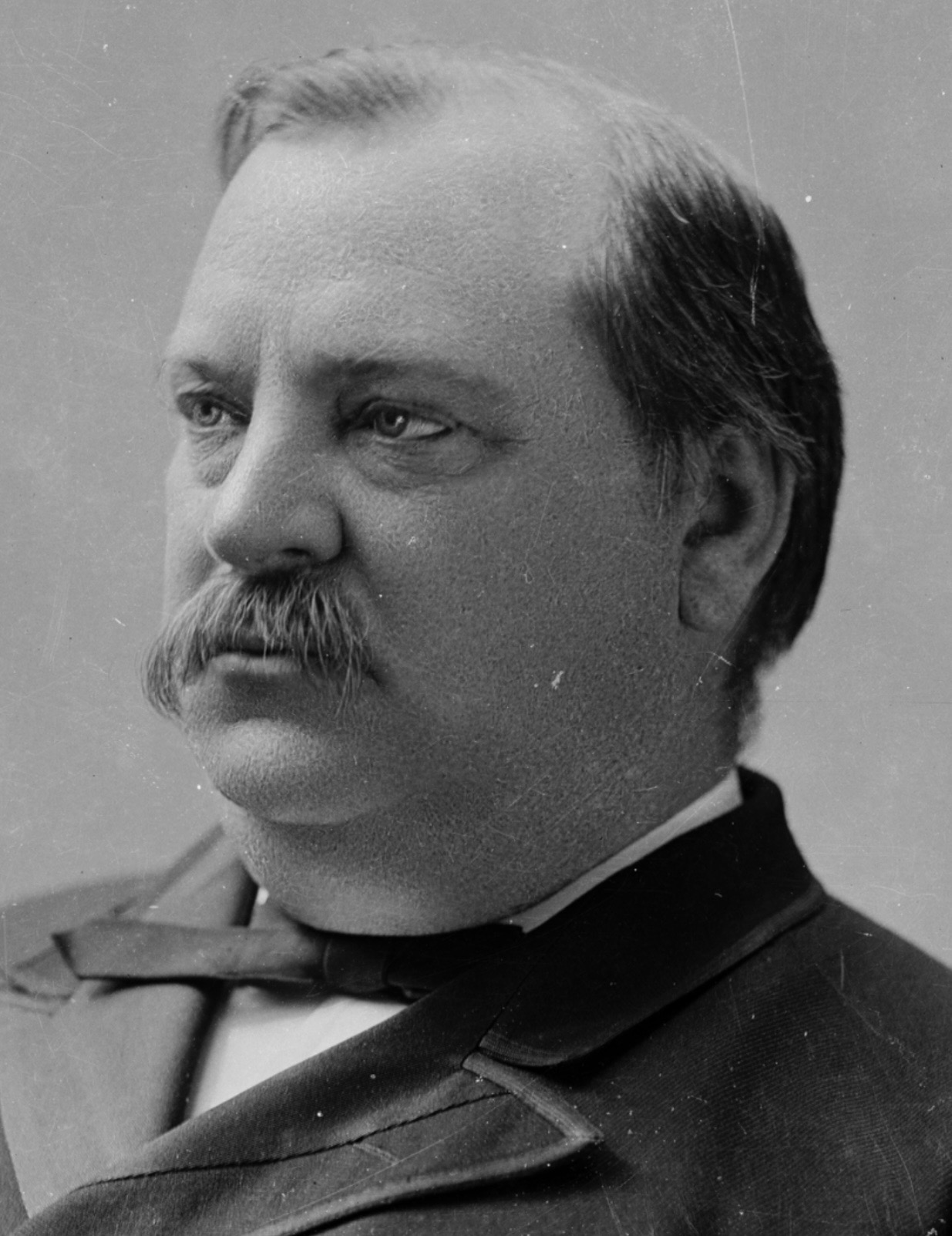

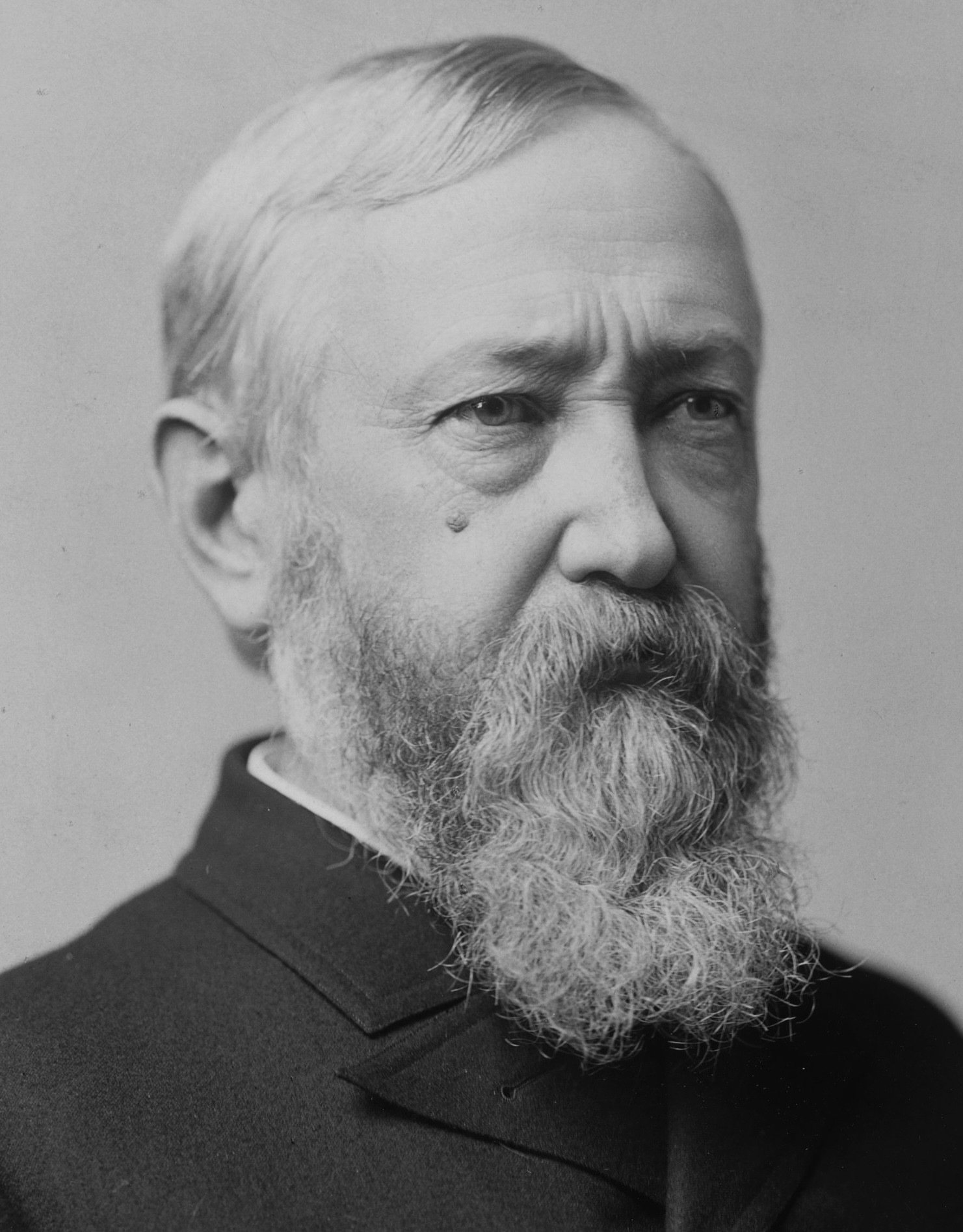
| Nominee | Grover Cleveland | Benjamin Harrison |
| Party | Democratic | Republican |
| Home state | New York | Indiana |
| Running mate | Allen G. Thurman | Levi P. Morton |
| Electoral vote | 11 | 0 |
| Popular vote | 147,902 | 134,784 |
| Percentage | 51.79% | 47.20% |
County results
Cleveland
40–50%
50–60%
60–70%
70–80%
Harrison
40–50%
50–60%
60–70%
70–80%
President before election
Grover Cleveland
Democratic
Elected President
Benjamin Harrison
Republican

The 1888 United States presidential election in North Carolina took place on November 6, 1888, as part of the 1888 United States presidential election. North Carolina voters chose 11 representatives, or electors, to the Electoral College, who voted for president and vice president.

North Carolina was won by the incumbent President Grover Cleveland (D–New York), running with the former Senator and Chief Justice of the Supreme Court of Ohio Allen G. Thurman, with 51.79% of the popular vote, against former Senator Benjamin Harrison (R-Indiana), running with Levi P. Morton, the 31st governor of New York, with 47.20% of the vote.

The Union Labor Party chose Alson Streeter, a former Illinois state representative, and Charles E. Cunningham as their presidential and vice-presidential candidates and received 0.01% of the vote. The Prohibition Party ran brigadier general Clinton B. Fisk and John A. Brooks and received 0.99% of the vote.

== Results ==
1888 United States presidential election in North Carolina
| Party | Candidate | Votes | % |
|---|---|---|---|
| Democratic | Grover Cleveland (incumbent) | 147,902 | 51.79% |
| Republican | Benjamin Harrison | 134,784 | 47.20% |
| Prohibition | Clinton B. Fisk | 2,840 | 0.99% |
| Union Labor | Alson Streeter | 37 | 0.01% |
| Total votes | | 285,563 | 100.00% |

=== Results by county ===
1888 United States presidential election in North Carolina by county
| County | Grover Cleveland Democratic | | Benjamin Harrison Republican | | Clinton B. Fisk Prohibition | | Alson Streeter Write-in | | Margin | |
| County | % | # | % | # | % | # | % | # | % | # |
|---|---|---|---|---|---|---|---|---|---|---|
| Catawba | 73.22% | 2,349 | 23.85% | 765 | 2.93% | 94 | | | 49.38% | 1,584 |
| Cleveland | 74.04% | 2,264 | 24.92% | 762 | 1.05% | 32 | | | 49.12% | 1,502 |
| Onslow | 72.21% | 1,177 | 27.79% | 453 | 0.00% | 0 | | | 44.42% | 724 |
| Union | 69.78% | 2,067 | 29.68% | 879 | 0.54% | 16 | | | 40.11% | 1,188 |
| Columbus | 69.59% | 2,078 | 29.91% | 893 | 0.50% | 15 | | | 39.69% | 1,185 |
| Currituck | 68.19% | 1,001 | 31.40% | 461 | 0.41% | 6 | | | 36.78% | 540 |
| Rowan | 67.22% | 2,732 | 31.35% | 1,274 | 1.43% | 58 | | | 35.88% | 1,458 |
| Anson | 67.15% | 2,157 | 32.85% | 1,055 | 0.00% | 0 | | | 34.31% | 1,102 |
| Duplin | 66.00% | 2,209 | 33.91% | 1,135 | 0.09% | 3 | | | 32.09% | 1,074 |
| Cabarrus | 62.07% | 1,659 | 34.90% | 933 | 3.03% | 81 | | | 27.16% | 726 |
| Caldwell | 63.47% | 1,258 | 36.48% | 723 | 0.05% | 1 | | | 26.99% | 535 |
| Alexander | 62.12% | 943 | 36.10% | 548 | 1.78% | 27 | | | 26.02% | 395 |
| Alleghany | 62.57% | 687 | 37.07% | 407 | 0.36% | 4 | | | 25.50% | 280 |
| Carteret | 59.16% | 1,082 | 39.04% | 714 | 1.80% | 33 | | | 20.12% | 368 |
| Sampson | 59.68% | 2,390 | 40.15% | 1,608 | 0.17% | 7 | | | 19.53% | 782 |
| Jackson | 58.88% | 902 | 39.95% | 612 | 1.17% | 18 | | | 18.93% | 290 |
| Robeson | 58.88% | 2,879 | 40.29% | 1,970 | 0.84% | 41 | | | 18.59% | 909 |
| Graham | 59.29% | 284 | 40.71% | 195 | 0.00% | 0 | | | 18.58% | 89 |
| Iredell | 58.03% | 2,720 | 40.41% | 1,894 | 1.56% | 73 | | | 17.62% | 826 |
| Gates | 58.56% | 1,146 | 41.29% | 808 | 0.15% | 3 | | | 17.27% | 338 |
| Johnston | 58.35% | 2,992 | 41.52% | 2,129 | 0.14% | 7 | | | 16.83% | 863 |
| Clay | 57.29% | 401 | 41.43% | 290 | 1.29% | 9 | | | 15.86% | 111 |
| Harnett | 57.66% | 1,498 | 42.34% | 1,100 | 0.00% | 0 | | | 15.32% | 398 |
| Wilson | 57.41% | 2,130 | 42.59% | 1,580 | 0.00% | 0 | | | 14.82% | 550 |
| Haywood | 56.67% | 1,325 | 42.39% | 991 | 0.94% | 22 | | | 14.29% | 334 |
| Stanly | 56.32% | 1,021 | 42.80% | 776 | 0.88% | 16 | | | 13.51% | 245 |
| Lincoln | 56.26% | 1,205 | 43.04% | 922 | 0.42% | 9 | 0.28% | 6 | 13.21% | 283 |
| Mecklenburg | 55.69% | 4,206 | 43.07% | 3,253 | 1.23% | 93 | | | 12.62% | 953 |
| Martin | 55.97% | 1,663 | 44.03% | 1,308 | 0.00% | 0 | | | 11.95% | 355 |
| Nash | 55.92% | 2,181 | 44.08% | 1,719 | 0.00% | 0 | | | 11.85% | 462 |
| Chatham | 54.47% | 2,581 | 42.78% | 2,027 | 2.74% | 130 | | | 11.69% | 554 |
| Tyrrell | 55.73% | 472 | 44.16% | 374 | 0.12% | 1 | | | 11.57% | 98 |
| Gaston | 54.10% | 1,589 | 42.90% | 1,260 | 2.62% | 77 | 0.37% | 11 | 11.20% | 329 |
| Cumberland | 55.44% | 2,523 | 44.56% | 2,028 | 0.00% | 0 | | | 10.88% | 495 |
| Orange | 54.73% | 1,613 | 44.08% | 1,299 | 1.19% | 35 | | | 10.65% | 314 |
| Pamlico | 54.32% | 730 | 45.01% | 605 | 0.67% | 9 | | | 9.30% | 125 |
| Swain | 52.54% | 527 | 45.16% | 453 | 2.29% | 23 | | | 7.38% | 74 |
| Yancey | 53.58% | 929 | 46.42% | 805 | 0.00% | 0 | | | 7.15% | 124 |
| Jones | 53.40% | 706 | 46.37% | 613 | 0.23% | 3 | | | 7.03% | 93 |
| McDowell | 53.10% | 1,002 | 46.32% | 874 | 0.58% | 11 | | | 6.78% | 128 |
| Durham | 51.91% | 1,835 | 45.77% | 1,618 | 2.32% | 82 | | | 6.14% | 217 |
| Lenoir | 52.14% | 1,598 | 46.56% | 1,427 | 1.31% | 40 | | | 5.58% | 171 |
| Alamance | 50.35% | 1,716 | 45.31% | 1,544 | 4.34% | 148 | | | 5.05% | 172 |
| Beaufort | 50.93% | 2,033 | 45.92% | 1,833 | 3.16% | 126 | | | 5.01% | 200 |
| Bladen | 52.50% | 1,520 | 47.50% | 1,375 | 0.00% | 0 | | | 5.01% | 145 |
| Franklin | 52.34% | 2,218 | 47.64% | 2,019 | 0.02% | 1 | | | 4.70% | 199 |
| Bertie | 52.23% | 1,218 | 47.56% | 1,109 | 0.21% | 5 | | | 4.67% | 109 |
| Hyde | 52.04% | 843 | 47.59% | 771 | 0.37% | 6 | | | 4.44% | 72 |
| Pitt | 51.43% | 2,569 | 47.21% | 2,358 | 1.36% | 68 | | | 4.22% | 211 |
| Rockingham | 51.43% | 2,351 | 47.60% | 2,176 | 0.96% | 44 | | | 3.83% | 175 |
| Burke | 51.65% | 1,249 | 48.06% | 1,162 | 0.29% | 7 | | | 3.60% | 87 |
| Moore | 50.87% | 1,955 | 47.51% | 1,826 | 1.09% | 42 | 0.52% | 20 | 3.36% | 129 |
| Macon | 50.31% | 805 | 47.13% | 754 | 2.56% | 41 | | | 3.19% | 51 |
| Brunswick | 51.36% | 1,023 | 48.44% | 965 | 0.20% | 4 | | | 2.91% | 58 |
| Person | 51.45% | 1,369 | 48.55% | 1,292 | 0.00% | 0 | | | 2.89% | 77 |
| Stokes | 51.28% | 1,442 | 48.47% | 1,363 | 0.25% | 7 | | | 2.81% | 79 |
| Hertford | 51.20% | 1,107 | 48.80% | 1,055 | 0.00% | 0 | | | 2.41% | 52 |
| Wayne | 50.71% | 2,748 | 48.51% | 2,629 | 0.78% | 42 | | | 2.20% | 119 |
| Polk | 50.70% | 436 | 48.60% | 418 | 0.70% | 6 | | | 2.09% | 18 |
| Surry | 50.70% | 1,672 | 48.85% | 1,611 | 0.45% | 15 | | | 1.85% | 61 |
| Buncombe | 49.68% | 2,956 | 48.29% | 2,873 | 2.03% | 121 | | | 1.39% | 83 |
| Rutherford | 49.78% | 1,678 | 49.51% | 1,669 | 0.71% | 24 | | | 0.27% | 9 |
| Richmond | 49.67% | 1,729 | 50.07% | 1,743 | 0.26% | 9 | | | -0.40% | -14 |
| Camden | 48.92% | 588 | 51.08% | 614 | 0.00% | 0 | | | -2.16% | -26 |
| Pender | 48.89% | 725 | 51.11% | 758 | 0.00% | 0 | | | -2.23% | -33 |
| Dare | 48.78% | 321 | 51.22% | 337 | 0.00% | 0 | | | -2.43% | -16 |
| Ashe | 48.26% | 1,416 | 51.74% | 1,518 | 0.00% | 0 | | | -3.48% | -102 |
| Watauga | 48.12% | 908 | 51.72% | 976 | 0.16% | 3 | | | -3.60% | -68 |
| Transylvania | 48.07% | 523 | 51.93% | 565 | 0.00% | 0 | | | -3.86% | -42 |
| Greene | 47.97% | 994 | 52.03% | 1,078 | 0.00% | 0 | | | -4.05% | -84 |
| Granville | 47.66% | 2,399 | 52.15% | 2,625 | 0.20% | 10 | | | -4.49% | -226 |
| Chowan | 47.61% | 738 | 52.13% | 808 | 0.26% | 4 | | | -4.52% | -70 |
| Randolph | 44.92% | 2,121 | 49.53% | 2,339 | 5.55% | 262 | | | -4.62% | -218 |
| Guilford | 44.41% | 2,462 | 49.08% | 2,721 | 6.51% | 361 | | | -4.67% | -259 |
| Wake | 46.85% | 4,511 | 52.23% | 5,029 | 0.92% | 89 | | | -5.38% | -518 |
| Halifax | 46.46% | 2,488 | 53.54% | 2,867 | 0.00% | 0 | | | -7.08% | -379 |
| Davidson | 45.30% | 2,023 | 52.53% | 2,346 | 2.17% | 97 | | | -7.23% | -323 |
| Forsyth | 45.64% | 2,238 | 53.28% | 2,613 | 1.08% | 53 | | | -7.65% | -375 |
| Northampton | 45.69% | 1,684 | 54.15% | 1,996 | 0.16% | 6 | | | -8.46% | -312 |
| Davie | 45.32% | 1,008 | 53.91% | 1,199 | 0.76% | 17 | | | -8.59% | -191 |
| Caswell | 45.20% | 1,351 | 54.43% | 1,627 | 0.37% | 11 | | | -9.23% | -276 |
| Montgomery | 45.05% | 992 | 54.81% | 1,207 | 0.14% | 3 | | | -9.76% | -215 |
| Perquimans | 43.87% | 783 | 55.24% | 986 | 0.90% | 16 | | | -11.37% | -203 |
| Cherokee | 43.11% | 673 | 56.89% | 888 | 0.00% | 0 | | | -13.77% | -215 |
| Yadkin | 41.91% | 1,065 | 56.32% | 1,431 | 1.77% | 45 | | | -14.40% | -366 |
| Washington | 42.17% | 775 | 57.18% | 1,051 | 0.65% | 12 | | | -15.02% | -276 |
| Wilkes | 42.29% | 1,691 | 57.31% | 2,292 | 0.40% | 16 | | | -15.03% | -601 |
| Vance | 41.79% | 1,385 | 58.21% | 1,929 | 0.00% | 0 | | | -16.42% | -544 |
| Henderson | 41.37% | 915 | 58.63% | 1,297 | 0.00% | 0 | | | -17.27% | -382 |
| Pasquotank | 39.86% | 826 | 58.93% | 1,221 | 1.21% | 25 | | | -19.06% | -395 |
| New Hanover | 39.57% | 1,870 | 60.43% | 2,856 | 0.00% | 0 | | | -20.86% | -986 |
| Warren | 38.45% | 549 | 61.55% | 879 | 0.00% | 0 | | | -23.11% | -330 |
| Madison | 37.81% | 1,158 | 62.06% | 1,901 | 0.13% | 4 | | | -24.26% | -743 |
| Edgecombe | 34.32% | 1,331 | 65.55% | 2,542 | 0.13% | 5 | | | -31.23% | -1,211 |
| Craven | 34.12% | 1,359 | 65.73% | 2,618 | 0.15% | 6 | | | -31.61% | -1,259 |
| Mitchell | 29.98% | 679 | 70.02% | 1,586 | 0.00% | 0 | | | -40.04% | -907 |

== See also ==
- United States presidential elections in North Carolina
