= 1888 United States presidential election in Missouri =

- November 6, 1888
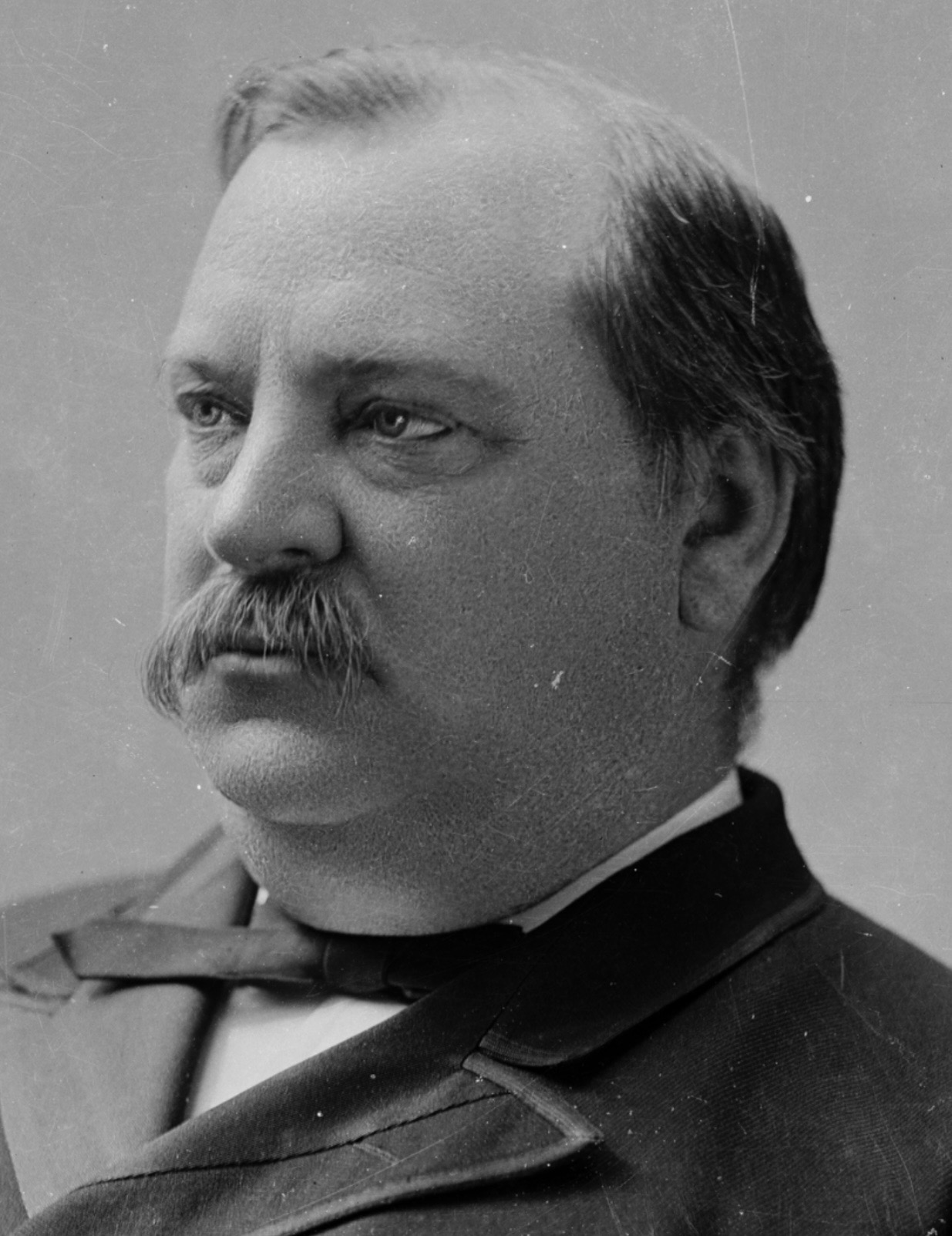

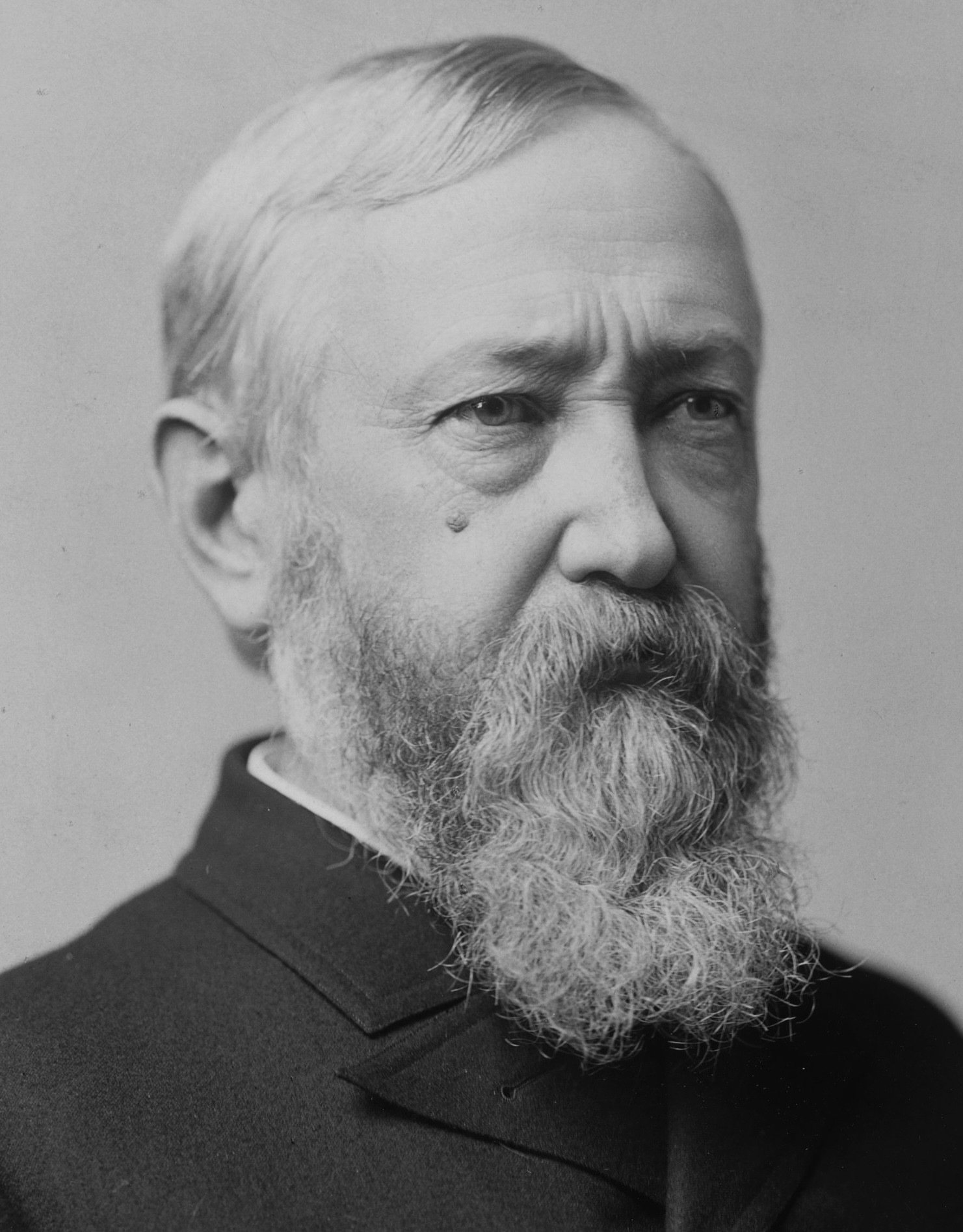
Nominee	Grover Cleveland	Benjamin Harrison
Party	Democratic	Republican
Home state	New York	Indiana
Running mate	Allen G. Thurman	Levi P. Morton
Electoral vote	16	0
Popular vote	261,943	236,252
Percentage	50.24%	45.31%
County results
Cleveland
40–50%
50–60%
60–70%
70–80%
Harrison
40–50%
50–60%
60–70%
70–80%
President before election
Grover Cleveland
Democratic
Elected President
Benjamin Harrison
Republican

The 1888 United States presidential election in Missouri took place on November 6, 1888, as part of the 1888 United States presidential election. Voters chose 16 representatives, or electors, to the Electoral College, who voted for president and vice president.

Missouri voted for the Democratic nominee, incumbent President Grover Cleveland, over the Republican nominee, Benjamin Harrison. Cleveland won the state by a margin of 4.93%.

== Results ==
1888 United States presidential election in Missouri
Party	Candidate	Running mate	Popular vote		Electoral vote	
Party	Candidate	Running mate	Count	%	Count	%
Democratic	Grover Cleveland of New York (incumbent)	Allen Granberry Thurman of Ohio	261,943	50.24%	16	100.00%
Republican	Benjamin Harrison of Indiana	Levi Parsons Morton of New York	236,252	45.31%	0	0.00%
Union Labor	Alson Jenness Streeter of Illinois	Charles E. Cunningham of Arkansas	18,626	3.57%	0	0.00%
Prohibition	Clinton Bowen Fisk of New Jersey	John Anderson Brooks of Missouri	4,539	0.87%	0	0.00%
Total			521,360	100.00%	16	100.00%

== See also ==
- United States presidential elections in Missouri
