= 1888 United States presidential election in West Virginia =

- November 6, 1888
- Turnout: 25.78% of the total population ▲4.41 pp
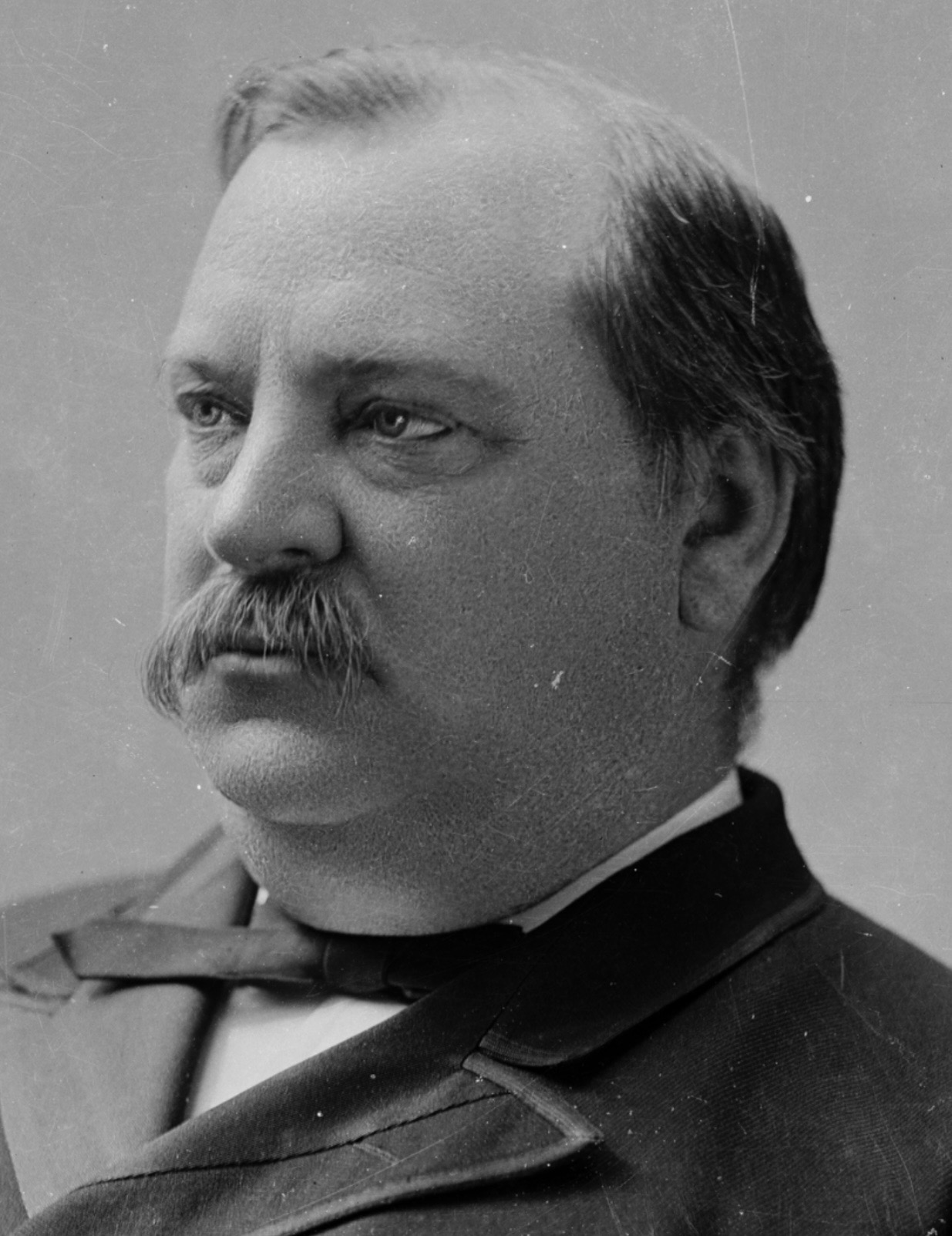

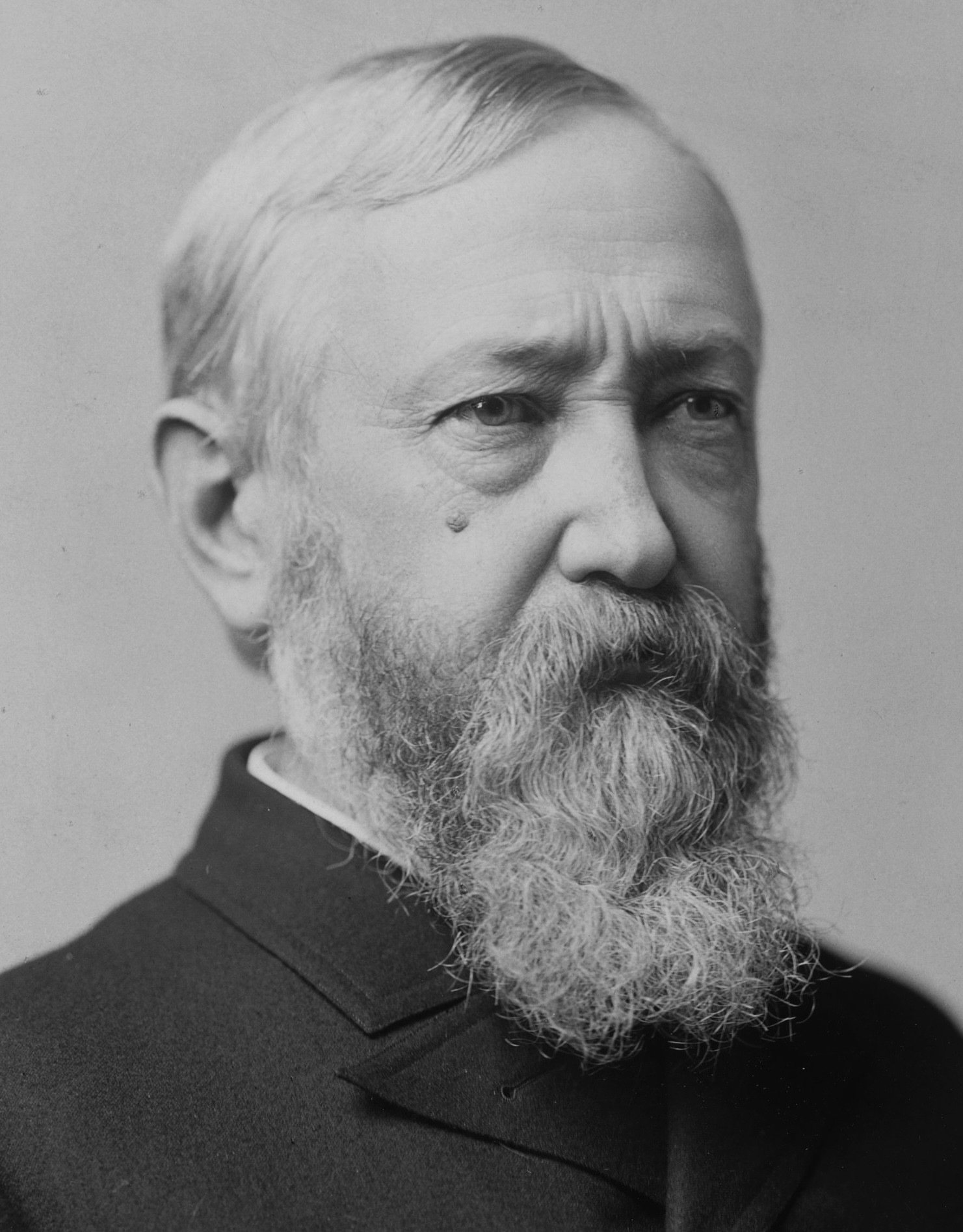
Nominee	Grover Cleveland	Benjamin Harrison
Party	Democratic	Republican
Home state	New York	Indiana
Running mate	Allen G. Thurman	Levi P. Morton
Electoral vote	6	0
Popular vote	78,677	78,171
Percentage	49.35%	49.03%
County results
Cleveland
40–50%
50–60%
60–70%
70–80%
Harrison
40–50%
50–60%
60–70%
70–80%
President before election
Grover Cleveland
Democratic
Elected President
Benjamin Harrison
Republican

The 1888 United States presidential election in West Virginia took place on November 6, 1888, as part of the 1888 United States presidential election. State voters chose six representatives, or electors, to the Electoral College, who voted for president and vice president.

West Virginia was won by the incumbent President Grover Cleveland (D–New York), running with the former Senator and Chief Justice of the Supreme Court of Ohio Allen G. Thurman, with 49.35 percent of the popular vote, against former Senator Benjamin Harrison (R-Indiana), running with Levi P. Morton, the 31st governor of New York, with 49.03 percent of the vote. Cleveland's razor-thin 0.32 percentage point margin of victory in West Virginia remains the state's closest presidential election result in history.

The Union Labor Party chose Alson Streeter, a former Illinois state representative, and Charles E. Cunningham as their presidential and vice-presidential candidates and received 0.95 percent of the vote. The Prohibition Party ran brigadier general Clinton B. Fisk and John A. Brooks and received 0.68 percent of the vote.

== Results ==
1888 United States presidential election in West Virginia
Party	Candidate	Votes	%
Democratic	Grover Cleveland (incumbent)	78,677	49.35%
Republican	Benjamin Harrison	78,171	49.03%
Union Labor	Alson Streeter	1,508	0.95%
Prohibition	Clinton B. Fisk	1,084	0.68%
Total votes		159,440	100.00%

=== Results by county ===
1888 United States presidential election in West Virginia by county
County	Grover Cleveland Democratic		Benjamin Harrison Republican		Alson J. Streeter Union Labor		Clinton B. Fisk Prohibition		Margin		Total votes cast
County	#	%	#	%	#	%	#	%	#	%	Total votes cast
Barbour	1,508	50.40%	1,473	49.23%	9	0.30%	2	0.07%	35	1.17%	2,992
Berkeley	2,011	47.89%	2,183	51.99%	0	0.00%	5	0.12%	-172	-4.10%	4,199
Boone	741	58.62%	520	41.14%	2	0.16%	1	0.08%	221	17.48%	1,264
Braxton	1,688	61.27%	1,062	38.55%	0	0.00%	5	0.18%	626	22.72%	2,755
Brooke	804	50.16%	788	49.16%	0	0.00%	11	0.69%	16	1.00%	1,603
Cabell	2,427	55.01%	1,947	44.13%	8	0.18%	30	0.68%	480	10.88%	4,412
Calhoun	935	59.55%	623	39.68%	11	0.70%	1	0.06%	312	19.87%	1,570
Clay	414	46.73%	464	52.37%	8	0.90%	0	0.00%	-50	-5.64%	886
Doddridge	1,151	45.08%	1,393	54.56%	6	0.24%	3	0.12%	-242	-9.48%	2,553
Fayette	1,923	40.45%	2,616	55.03%	189	3.98%	26	0.55%	-693	-14.58%	4,754
Gilmer	1,179	58.60%	833	41.40%	0	0.00%	0	0.00%	346	17.20%	2,012
Grant	378	26.69%	1,027	72.53%	2	0.14%	9	0.64%	-649	-45.83%	1,416
Greenbrier	2,121	60.22%	1,393	39.55%	0	0.00%	8	0.23%	728	20.67%	3,522
Hampshire	1,907	78.38%	519	21.33%	0	0.00%	7	0.29%	1,388	57.05%	2,433
Hancock	489	40.45%	675	55.83%	33	2.73%	12	0.99%	-186	-15.38%	1,209
Hardy	1,153	72.20%	439	27.49%	0	0.00%	5	0.31%	714	44.71%	1,597
Harrison	2,161	43.84%	2,628	53.32%	118	2.39%	22	0.45%	-467	-9.47%	4,929
Jackson	1,942	46.28%	2,234	53.24%	0	0.00%	20	0.48%	-292	-6.96%	4,196
Jefferson	2,357	67.11%	1,132	32.23%	16	0.46%	7	0.20%	1,225	34.88%	3,512
Kanawha	3,089	37.19%	4,541	54.66%	582	7.01%	95	1.14%	-1,452	-17.48%	8,307
Lewis	1,642	51.39%	1,527	47.79%	4	0.13%	22	0.69%	115	3.60%	3,195
Lincoln	1,147	54.46%	950	45.11%	9	0.43%	0	0.00%	197	9.35%	2,106
Logan	1,533	79.60%	393	20.40%	0	0.00%	0	0.00%	1,140	59.19%	1,926
Marion	2,256	48.96%	2,233	48.46%	69	1.50%	50	1.09%	23	0.50%	4,608
Marshall	1,837	39.90%	2,676	58.12%	0	0.00%	91	1.98%	-839	-18.22%	4,604
Mason	2,321	46.29%	2,646	52.77%	0	0.00%	47	0.94%	-325	-6.48%	5,014
McDowell	409	41.27%	582	58.73%	0	0.00%	0	0.00%	-173	-17.46%	991
Mercer	1,374	49.26%	1,402	50.27%	7	0.25%	6	0.22%	-28	-1.00%	2,789
Mineral	1,209	48.36%	1,251	50.04%	9	0.36%	31	1.24%	-42	-1.68%	2,500
Monongalia	1,361	37.82%	2,208	61.35%	0	0.00%	30	0.83%	-847	-23.53%	3,599
Monroe	1,338	51.72%	1,222	47.24%	0	0.00%	27	1.04%	116	4.48%	2,587
Morgan	539	37.46%	877	60.95%	0	0.00%	23	1.60%	-338	-23.49%	1,439
Nicholas	1,016	54.98%	779	42.15%	13	0.70%	40	2.16%	237	12.82%	1,848
Ohio	4,855	50.07%	4,749	48.98%	0	0.00%	92	0.95%	106	1.09%	9,696
Pendleton	1,012	56.47%	779	43.47%	0	0.00%	1	0.06%	233	13.00%	1,792
Pleasants	803	53.18%	693	45.89%	7	0.46%	7	0.46%	110	7.28%	1,510
Pocahontas	891	60.04%	587	39.56%	0	0.00%	6	0.40%	304	20.49%	1,484
Preston	1,403	31.32%	2,998	66.92%	35	0.78%	44	0.98%	-1,595	-35.60%	4,480
Putnam	1,390	45.59%	1,521	49.89%	128	4.20%	10	0.33%	-131	-4.30%	3,049
Raleigh	924	52.80%	806	46.06%	0	0.00%	20	1.14%	118	6.74%	1,750
Randolph	1,426	64.88%	772	35.12%	0	0.00%	0	0.00%	654	29.75%	2,198
Ritchie	1,408	40.23%	1,960	56.00%	32	0.91%	100	2.86%	-552	-15.77%	3,500
Roane	1,636	52.93%	1,449	46.88%	3	0.10%	3	0.10%	187	6.05%	3,091
Summers	1,353	51.25%	1,272	48.18%	0	0.00%	15	0.57%	81	3.07%	2,640
Taylor	1,219	43.06%	1,580	55.81%	2	0.07%	30	1.06%	-361	-12.75%	2,831
Tucker	680	51.52%	628	47.58%	6	0.45%	6	0.45%	52	3.94%	1,320
Tyler	1,137	41.89%	1,562	57.55%	1	0.04%	14	0.52%	-425	-15.66%	2,714
Upshur	841	32.32%	1,716	65.95%	21	0.81%	24	0.92%	-875	-33.63%	2,602
Wayne	2,058	59.26%	1,412	40.66%	0	0.00%	3	0.09%	646	18.60%	3,473
Webster	658	69.05%	295	30.95%	0	0.00%	0	0.00%	363	38.09%	953
Wetzel	2,295	61.68%	1,385	37.22%	34	0.91%	7	0.19%	910	24.46%	3,721
Wirt	1,054	53.02%	921	46.33%	10	0.50%	3	0.15%	133	6.69%	1,988
Wood	2,803	44.82%	3,255	52.05%	134	2.14%	62	0.99%	-452	-7.23%	6,254
Wyoming	471	44.10%	596	55.81%	0	0.00%	1	0.09%	-125	-11.70%	1,068
Totals	78,677	49.35%	78,172	49.03%	1,508	0.95%	1,084	0.68%	505	0.32%	159,441

== See also ==
- United States presidential elections in West Virginia
