= 1888 United States presidential election in Maine =

- November 6, 1888
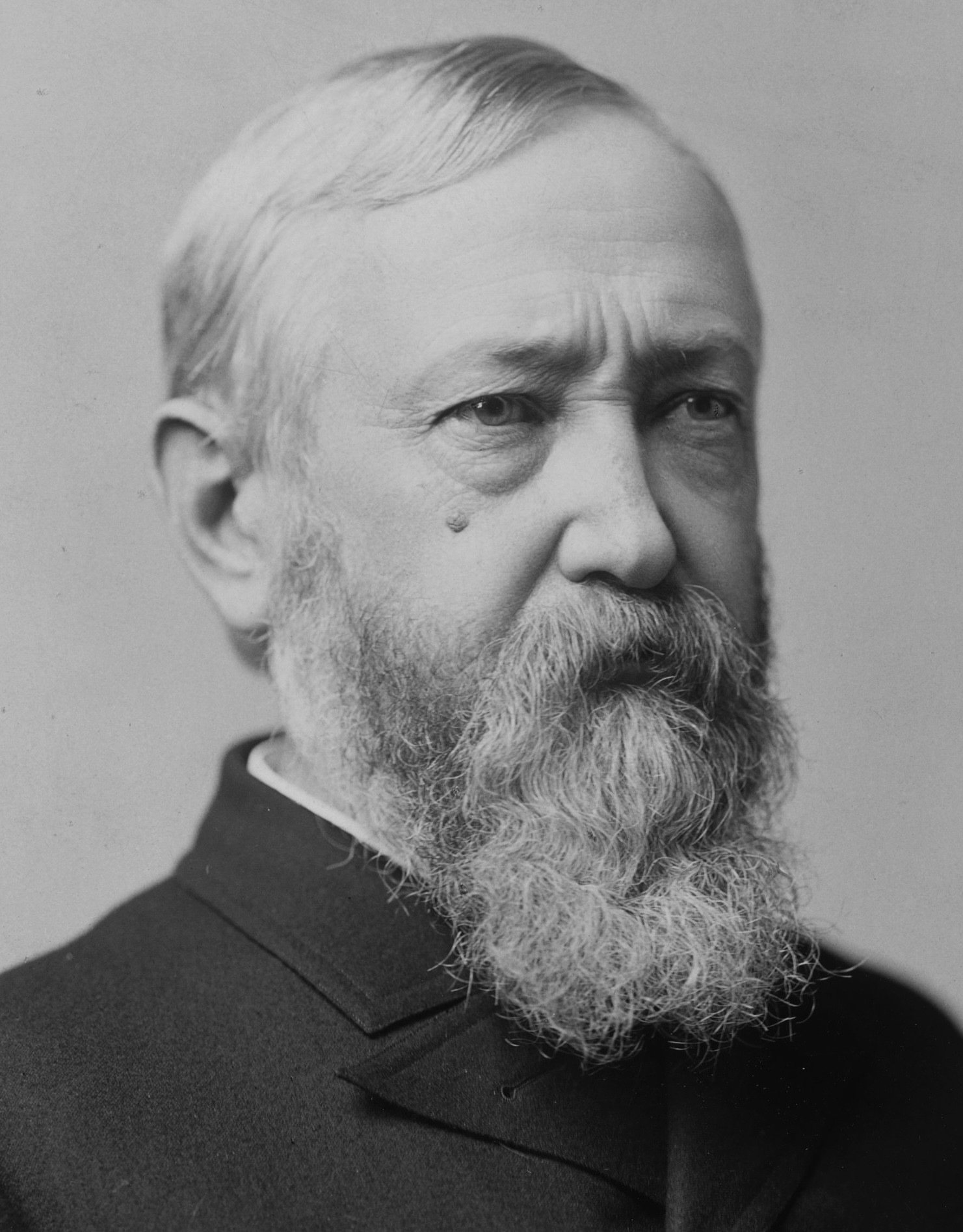

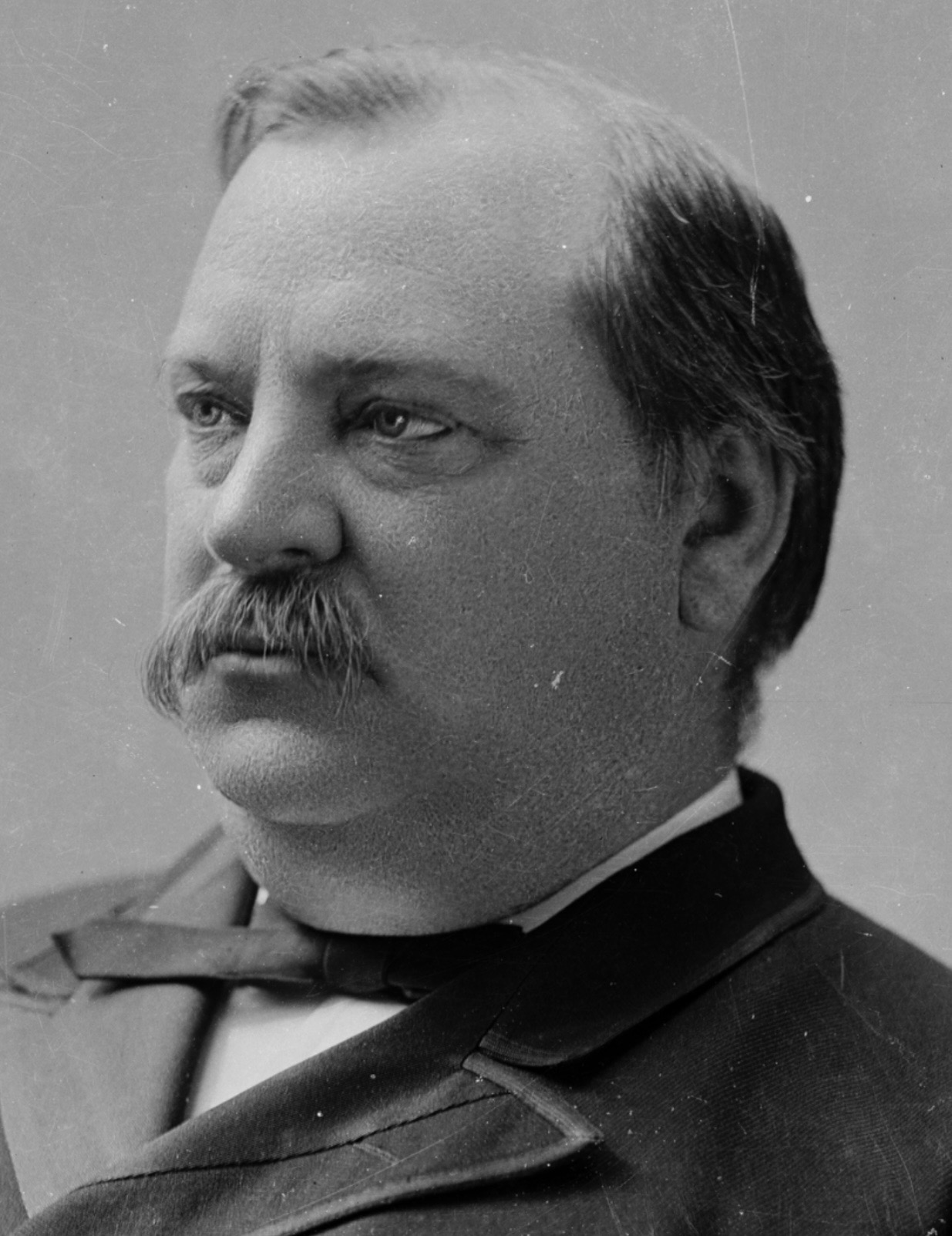
Nominee	Benjamin Harrison	Grover Cleveland
Party	Republican	Democratic
Home state	Indiana	New York
Running mate	Levi P. Morton	Allen G. Thurman
Electoral vote	6	0
Popular vote	73,730	50,472
Percentage	57.49%	39.35%
County results
Harrison
50–60%
60–70%
President before election
Grover Cleveland
Democratic
Elected President
Benjamin Harrison
Republican

The 1888 United States presidential election in Maine took place on November 6, 1888, as part of the 1888 United States presidential election. Voters chose six representatives, or electors to the Electoral College, who voted for president and vice president.

Maine voted for the Republican nominee, Benjamin Harrison, over the Democratic nominee, incumbent President Grover Cleveland. Harrison won the state by a margin of 18.14%.

With 57.49% of the popular vote, Maine would prove to be Harrison's third strongest victory in terms of percentage in the popular vote after Vermont and Nevada.

== Results ==
1888 United States presidential election in Maine
Party	Candidate	Running mate	Popular vote		Electoral vote	
Party	Candidate	Running mate	Count	%	Count	%
Republican	Benjamin Harrison of Indiana	Levi Parsons Morton of New York	73,730	57.49%	6	100.00%
Democratic	Grover Cleveland of New York (incumbent)	Allen Granberry Thurman of Ohio	50,472	39.35%	0	0.00%
Prohibition	Clinton Bowen Fisk of New Jersey	John Anderson Brooks of Missouri	2,691	2.10%	0	0.00%
Union Labor	Alson Jenness Streetcar of Illinois	Charles E. Cunningham of Arkansas	1,344	1.05%	0	0.00%
N/A	Others	Others	16	0.01%	0	0.00%
Total			128,253	100.00%	6	100.00%

=== Results by county ===
County	Benjamin Harrison Republican		Stephen Grover Cleveland Democratic		Clinton Bowen Fisk Prohibition		Alson Jenness Streeter Labor		Various candidates Other parties		Margin		Total votes cast
County	#	%	#	%	#	%	#	%	#	%	#	%	Total votes cast
Androscoggin	4,893	54.99%	3,585	40.29%	219	2.46%	201	2.26%			1,308	14.70%	8,898
Aroostook	3,365	60.73%	1,808	32.63%	360	6.50%	8	0.14%			1,557	28.10%	5,541
Cumberland	9,880	53.80%	7,975	43.43%	458	2.49%	50	0.27%			1,905	10.37%	18,363
Franklin	2,485	60.95%	1,518	37.23%	53	1.30%	21	0.52%			967	23.72%	4,077
Hancock	4,160	58.94%	2,772	39.27%	57	0.81%	69	0.98%			1,388	19.67%	7,058
Kennebec	7,453	62.46%	4,139	34.69%	221	1.85%	119	1.00%			3,314	27.77%	11,932
Knox	2,965	52.28%	2,290	40.38%	99	1.75%	317	5.59%			675	11.90%	5,671
Lincoln	2,436	56.25%	1,801	41.58%	84	1.94%	10	0.23%			635	14.66%	4,331
Oxford	4,349	57.82%	2,951	39.24%	141	1.87%	80	1.06%			1,398	18.59%	7,521
Penobscot	7,873	57.97%	5,292	38.97%	338	2.49%	77	0.57%			2,581	19.01%	13,580
Piscataquis	2,091	60.35%	1,297	37.43%	77	2.22%	0	0.00%			794	22.91%	3,465
Sagadahoc	2,536	63.24%	1,246	31.07%	116	2.89%	112	2.79%			1,290	32.17%	4,010
Somerset	4,572	60.32%	2,851	37.61%	97	1.28%	60	0.79%			1,721	22.70%	7,580
Waldo	3,123	54.00%	2,504	43.30%	81	1.40%	75	1.30%			619	10.70%	5,783
Washington	4,298	58.89%	2,876	39.41%	40	0.55%	84	1.15%			1,422	19.48%	7,298
York	7,255	55.20%	5,576	42.43%	250	1.90%	61	0.46%			1,679	12.78%	13,142
	73,734	57.49%	50,481	39.36%	2,691	2.10%	1,344	1.05%	16 (Note: These sixteen scattered votes were not reported by county but only as a statewide total)	0.01%	23,253	18.13%	128,250

== See also ==
- United States presidential elections in Maine
