= 1888 United States presidential election in Vermont =

- November 6, 1888
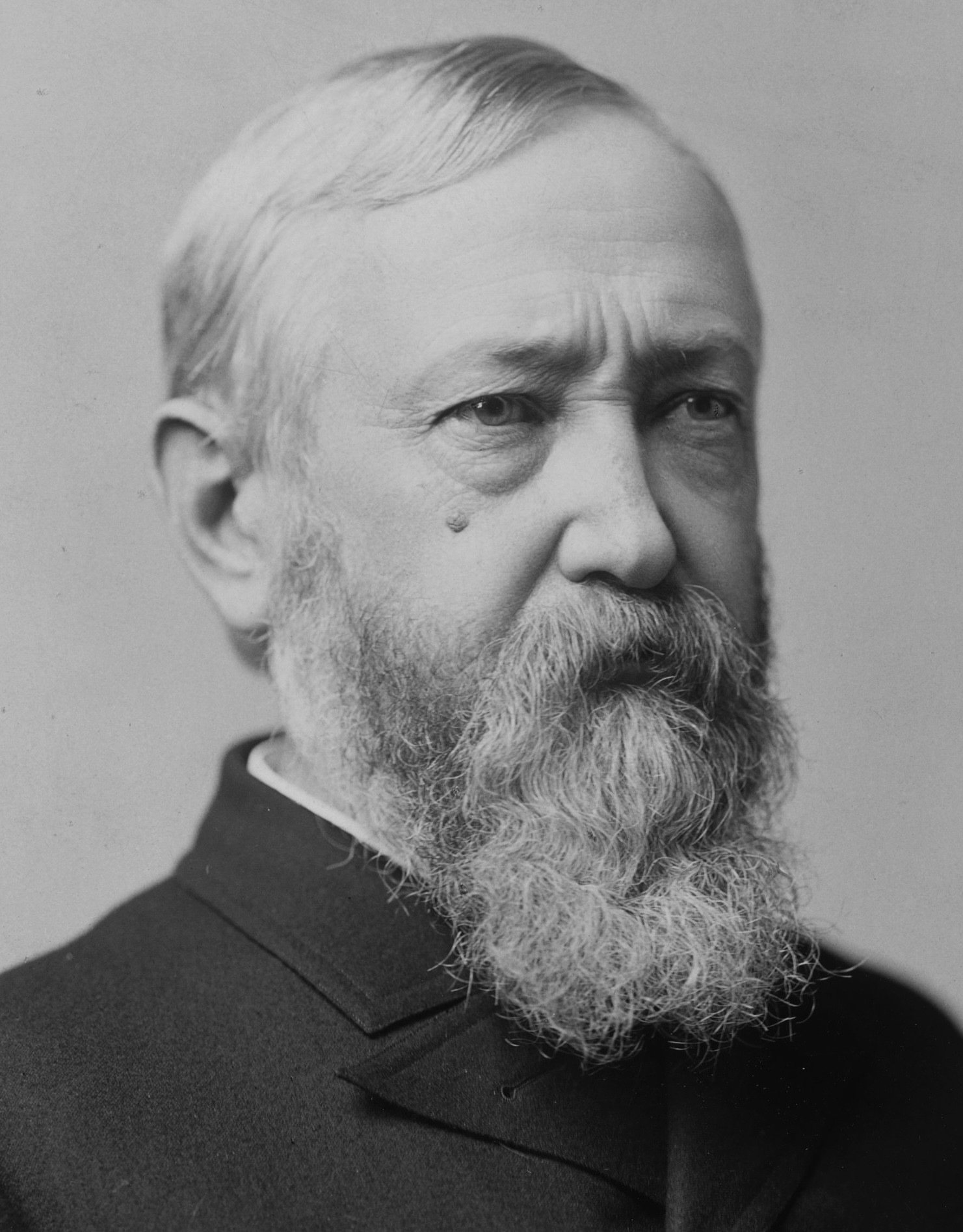

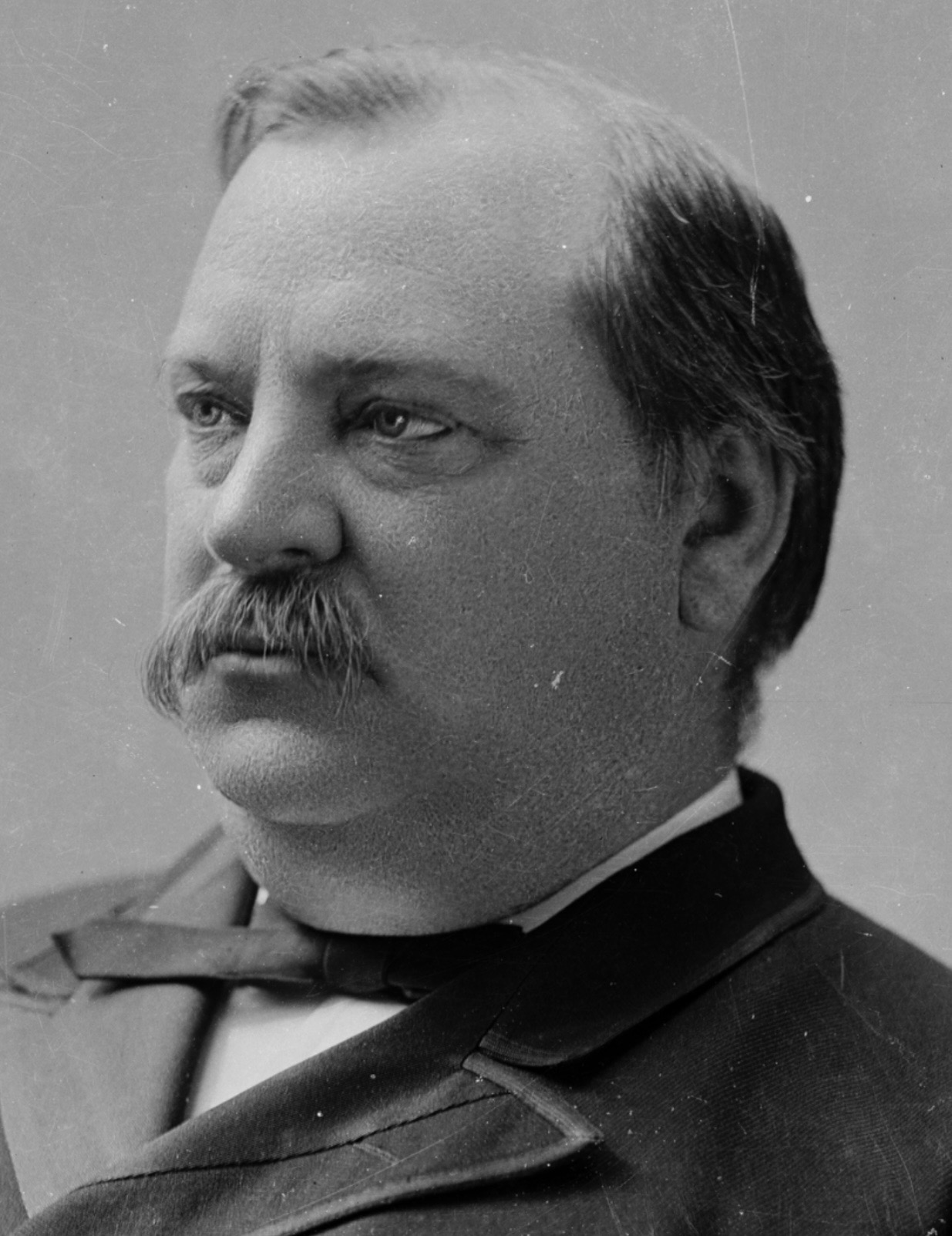
Nominee	Benjamin Harrison	Grover Cleveland
Party	Republican	Democratic
Home state	Indiana	New York
Running mate	Levi P. Morton	Allen G. Thurman
Electoral vote	4	0
Popular vote	45,192	16,788
Percentage	69.05%	25.65%

Harrison
40–50%
50–60%
60–70%
70–80%
80–90%
90–100%
Cleveland
40–50%
50–60%
60–70%
80–90%
Tie
40–50%
President before election
Grover Cleveland
Democratic
Elected President
Benjamin Harrison
Republican

The 1888 United States presidential election in Vermont took place on November 6, 1888, as part of the 1888 United States presidential election. Voters chose four representatives, or electors to the Electoral College, who voted for president and vice president.

Vermont voted for the Republican nominee, Benjamin Harrison, over the Democratic nominee, incumbent President Grover Cleveland. Harrison won Vermont by a margin of 43.40%.

With 69.05% of the popular vote, Vermont would be Harrison's strongest victory in terms of percentage in the popular vote.

Vice President-elect Levi P. Morton was born in Shoreham, Vermont.

== Results ==
1888 United States presidential election in Vermont
Party	Candidate	Running mate	Popular vote		Electoral vote	
Party	Candidate	Running mate	Count	%	Count	%
Republican	Benjamin Harrison of Indiana	Levi Parsons Morton of New York	45,192	69.05%	4	100.00%
Democratic	Grover Cleveland of New York (incumbent)	Allen Granberry Thurman of Ohio	16,788	25.65%	0	0.00%
Union Labor	Alson Jenness Streetcar of Illinois	Charles E. Cunningham of Arkansas	1,977	3.02%	0	0.00%
Prohibition	Clinton Bowen Fisk of New Jersey	John Anderson Brooks of Missouri	1,460	2.23%	0	0.00%
N/A	Others	Others	35	0.05%	0	0.00%
Total			65,452	100.00%	4	100.00%

=== Results by county ===
County	Benjamin Harrison Republican		Stephen Grover Cleveland Democratic		Alson Jenness Streeter Union Labor (Note: The Streeter total include 35 write-in votes, whose data were not compiled separately from the actual Streeter vote by Géoelections.)		Clinton Bowen Fisk Prohibition		Margin		Total votes cast
County	#	%	#	%	#	%	#	%	#	%	Total votes cast
Addison	4,036	82.77%	618	12.67%	58	1.19%	164	3.36%	3,418	70.10%	4,876
Bennington	2,497	60.72%	1,128	27.43%	396	9.63%	91	2.21%	1,369	33.29%	4,112
Caledonia	3,083	65.82%	1,249	26.67%	190	4.06%	162	3.46%	1,834	39.15%	4,684
Chittenden	4,149	65.59%	1,940	30.67%	131	2.07%	106	1.68%	2,209	34.92%	6,326
Essex	907	61.62%	502	34.10%	38	2.58%	25	1.70%	405	27.51%	1,472
Franklin	3,121	67.34%	1,343	28.98%	0	0.00%	171	3.69%	1,778	38.36%	4,635
Grand Isle	465	71.76%	180	27.78%	0	0.00%	3	0.46%	285	43.98%	648
Lamoille	1,797	74.10%	543	22.39%	19	0.78%	66	2.72%	1,254	51.71%	2,425
Orange	2,786	62.56%	1,277	28.68%	276	6.20%	114	2.56%	1,509	43.88%	4,453
Orleans	3,036	73.55%	724	17.54%	265	6.42%	103	2.50%	2,312	56.01%	4,128
Rutland	6,088	68.57%	2,417	27.22%	220	2.48%	153	1.72%	3,671	41.35%	8,878
Washington	3,715	64.70%	1,892	32.95%	32	0.56%	103	1.79%	1,823	31.75%	5,742
Windham	4,344	69.75%	1,518	24.37%	244	3.92%	122	1.96%	2,826	45.38%	6,228
Windsor	5,163	75.48%	1,457	21.30%	143	2.09%	77	1.13%	3,706	54.18%	6,840
Totals	45,187	69.04%	16,788	25.65%	2,012	3.07%	1,460	2.23%	28,399	43.39%	65,447

== See also ==
- United States presidential elections in Vermont
