= 1888 Union Labor National Convention =

- 1888 presidential election
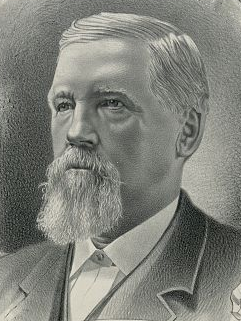
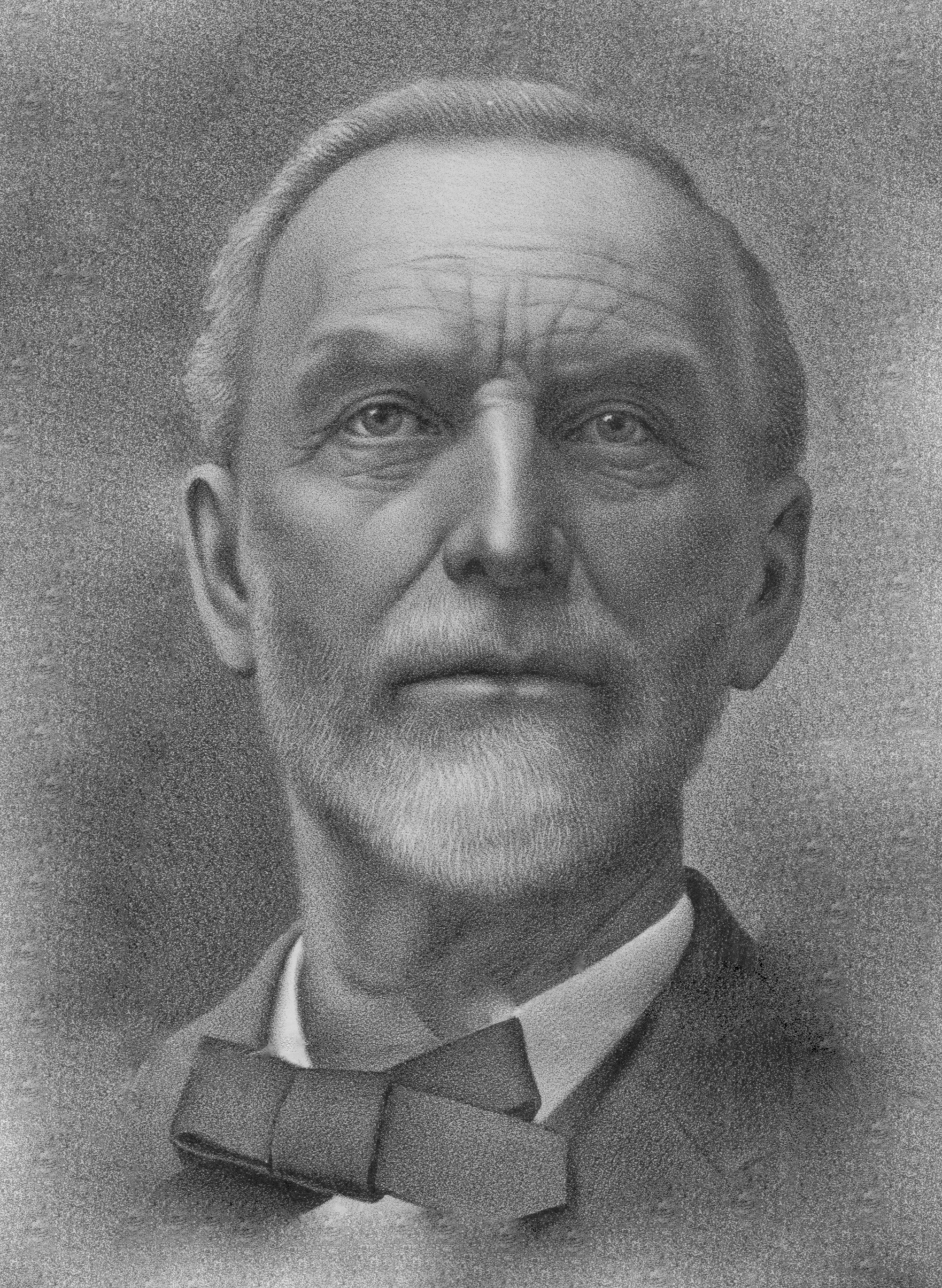
- Nominees (Streeter and Cunningham)

Convention
- Date(s): May 15–16, 1888
- City: Cincinnati, Ohio
- Venue: Grand Opera House
- Chair: John Seitz

Candidates
- Presidential nominee: Alson Streeter of Illinois
- Vice-presidential nominee: Charles R. Cunningham (Note: chosen after Samuel Evans of Texas declined nomination) of Arkansas

Voting
- Total delegates: ~220
- Results (president): acclamation
- Ballots: 1

The Union Labor Party held a national presidential nominating convention May 15–16 at Grand Opera House in Cincinnati, Ohio. The party nominated Alson Streeter of Illinois for president. It initially nominated Samuel Evans of Texas for vice president. Evans soon declined the nomination, and Charles E. Cunningham was instead nominated.

The convention explored a merger with the Greenback Party and United Labor Party, which were holding coinciding conventions in the city. However, no such merger was agreed to.

== Logistics ==
May 15–16, 1888 at the Grand Opera House in Cincinnati, Ohio. The convention as held earlier than conventions for the major parties and other large third parties.

Approximately 220 delegates represented 20 states at the convention.

Seymour F. Norton of Illinois served as chairman pro tempore of the convention, and John Seitz of Ohio served as chairman of the convention.

== Platform ==
The party adopted a platform with planks on land, transportation, money, labor, pensions, income tax, among other subjects. The platform also included a plank demanding for the United States Constitution to be amended to create the direct election of senators (as was later done with the Seventeenth Amendment); a plank demanding "strict enforcement of laws prohibiting the importation of subjects of foreign countries under contract [for labor]; a plank demanding the passage of new laws and enforcement of existing laws (such as the Chinese Exclusion Act) to exclude Chinese people from the United States; and a plank in support for women's suffrage.

The final plank of the platform described "the paramount issues to be solved in there interests of humanity" as being "the abolition of usury, monopoly, and trusts". This same plank denounced both the Democratic Party and the Republican Party as being forces to be faulted for "creating and perpetuating these monstrous evils".

== Presidential nomination ==
Alson Streeter of Illinois was nominated for president by acclamation. Streeter was an Illinois state senator, a farmer, and had been the Greenback Party nominee in the 1880 Illinois gubernatorial election.

== Vice presidential nomination ==
Candidates in the balloting for the vice presidential balloting were:

- Charles R. Cunningham of Arkansas
- Samuel Evans, farmer from Texas
- T.P. Rynders of Pennsylvania

The results of the single round of balloting was as follows:

Vice presidential nomination balloting
	1st ballot
Samuel Evans	124
T.P. Rynders	44
Charles R. Cunningham	32

Evans soon declined the nomination, and Cunningham was then chosen to replace him.

== Coinciding conventions, efforts to merge forces ==
The Union Labor Party considered merging forces (through electoral fusion) with other parties that were holding coinciding national conventions in Cincinnati: the Greenback Party and United Labor Party. Prospects for merging were initially regarded as being likely between Union Labor and United Labor, and less likely but possible between Union Labor and the Greenbackers. However, the Union Labor Party adopted a resolution against electoral fusion which practically excluded a merger, and no mergers were ultimately agreed to before the Union Labor Party adjourned.

=== Greenback Party ===
The Greenback Party (by 1888 a rump party) held a lowly-attended coinciding convention in Cincinnati coinciding with the Union Labor National Convention.

Greenbackers held their conference inside of a room at the Burnet House hotel. Their meeting was chaired by George O. Jones, and was attended by approximately twelve party members, including E. H. Gillette of Iowa (national party chairman). Gillette was castigated by those in attendance, and tendered his resignation so that he could join the Union Labor Party instead. Jones was elected the new national chairman after this, and A. F. Shafer was elected party secretary.

A committee was appointed to confer with the Union Labor Party to discuss a possible merger, but the Greenback Party was staunch in asserting that a merger would not occur without the Union Labor Party adopting Greenbacker principles.

The conference ultimately voted against nominating a presidential ticket, voting to delay a decision to a layer convention. The Greenbackers adjourned their convention without a merger or nomination.

The Greenbackers reconvened in Cincinnati on September 12, with only seven delegates in attendance. At this second meeting, the party adopted resolutions opposing election fusion with other parties, but again failed to nominate a ticket of its own.

=== United Labor Party ===
The United Labor Party held a coinciding convention in Cincinnati, which was small in scale and took on a character more resembling a conference than a typical convention. Some newspapers referred to it as a "conference" and not a "convention".

An effort was attempted to merge the United Labor Party into the Union Labor Party, and a joint committee was formed to negotiate this. Shortly after the resolution against electoral fusion was adopted by a general session of the Union Labor Convention (while a joint committee on possible merger of the parties was in session), the joint committee was dissolved without agreeing to a merger.

On May 15, the United Labor Party's convention nominated Robert H. Cowdrey of Illinois for president on the first ballot. W.H.T. Wakefield of Kansas was nominated for vice-president over Victor H. Wilder from New York by a margin of 50–12. The convention also adopted a platform.
