= Labor Party (United States, 19th century) =

Number of 19th century political parties in the US

Labor Party was the name or partial name of a number of United States political parties which were organized during the 1870s and 1880s.

== History ==
- In 1867, the first American chapter of the International Workingmen's Association opened. In 1873, the Workingmen's Party of Illinois is formed. In 1874, the Social-Democratic Workingmen's Party of North America was formed. In the 1870s, the Social Political Workingmen's Society of Cincinnati was formed. In 1876, all four merged into the Workingmen's Party of the United States. In 1877, that became the Socialist Labor Party of North America.
- In 1877, the Workingman's Party was formed in California, led by Denis Kearney. By 1879, it was powerful enough to help re-write the state constitution of California, inserting provisions intended to curb the powers of capital and to abolish Chinese contract labor.
- In 1878, the Greenback Party, under the influence of leaders of organized labor, changed its name to the Greenback Labor Party. The GLP continued to operate in some states, electing a congressman as late as 1886. However, the party had dissipated by 1888.
- In 1886, a United Labor Party was organized in Chicago under the leadership of that city's Central Labor Union. It drew over 20,000 votes for its county ticket in the fall of 1886, and in the following spring elections garnered 28,000 votes for its candidate for mayor. However, by 1888, it had merged with the Democratic Party in that city.
- In 1884, in Wisconsin, the Milwaukee Trades' Assembly organized a fusion of the Greenback Party and Anti-Monopoly Party into a local People's Party. In 1886, this was reorganized into the Union Labor Party. The ULP saw obtained considerable results in the city of Milwaukee, electing a state senator, several members of the State Assembly (including Michael P. Walsh, their president) and a member of Congress, Henry Smith. In 1892, the ULP would merge into the People's Party.
- The most important of these local races of that period may have been that in New York City in 1886, when the United Labor Party of that city nominated Henry George for mayor of New York, and cast for him 68,000 votes. The Single Taxers and socialists united in this vote, with the Socialists supporting the George candidacy as a popular movement against corporate capitalism. By 1887, the United Labor Party of New York State nominated Henry George for Secretary of State, repudiating socialism. Socialist Labor members, combining with other labor organizations, formed a Progressive Labor Party, nominating John Swinton to run against Henry George. Swinton, however, would decline the nomination, instead choosing to run as the party's candidate for the State Senate's 7th district election, which he would go on to lose. J. Edward Hall was nominated by the convention in Swinton's place. The Progressive Labor Party vote of about 5,000 was virtually confined to New York City.
- In 1888, two "labor parties" appeared in the field of presidential politics. These were: (1) the Union Labor Party, which was formed by a coalition of the Greenback Labor Party, largely rural in its constituency, with the urban trade union movement, which had been demanding labor and industrial reforms: it nominated Alson Streeter for president; and (2) the United Labor Party, a much smaller party, which under leadership of Father Edward McGlynn of New York, demanded a single tax and the sharing of the rent of land. These parties both disappeared after the campaign of 1888.

In other states there were groupings known variously as United Labor Party, Union Labor Party, Industrial Labor Party, Labor Reform Party, or simply Labor Party.

== Activity and legacy ==
These parties were made up in varying proportions of members of the American Federation of Labor and Knights of Labor, socialists, Greenbackers, and even anarchists. They challenged the Republicans and Democrats primarily in local elections and state elections, but not at the presidential level. For varying reasons, none of these organizations maintained their existence as separate parties. The constituents and activists became involved either in one of the major parties (as in the Chicago example) or in such movements as the Populists (which in urban areas drew heavily on former Labor Party advocates), or the Socialist Party of America, and their various splinter groups.

There is no direct continuity between any of these organizations and the Union Labor Party of early 20th-century San Francisco, California; nor with the Duluth, Minnesota Union Labor Party which elected William Leighton Carss to Congress and various candidates to city offices in that region in the early 20th century, before merging into the Minnesota Farmer-Labor Party.

== See also ==
- 1888 Union Labor National Convention
