= John A. Brooks =

American politician

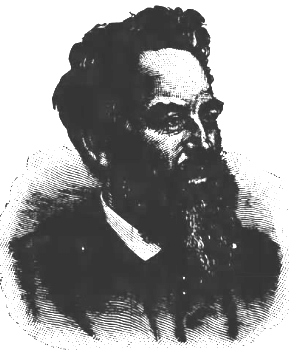

Personal details
- Born: John Anderson Brooks; June 3, 1836 Mason County, Kentucky, U.S.
- Died: February 3, 1897 (aged 60) Memphis, Tennessee, U.S.
- Party: Prohibition
- Spouse: Sue Robertson
- Children: 4
- Parents: John Thomas Brooks (father); Elizabeth Branch Anderson (mother)
- Education: Bethany College (BA)

John Anderson Brooks (June 3, 1836 – February 3, 1897) was a religious scholar and prohibitionist who served as the Prohibition Party's vice presidential nominee during the 1888 presidential election.

== Life ==
John Anderson Brooks was born on June 3, 1836, in Mason County, Kentucky to John Thomas Brooks and Elizabeth Branch Anderson. His ancestors were Virginians and his mother was descended to the Cook and Anderson families, which were part of the political elite of the state. The young Brooks was raised on a farm. He then left village school and completed his education at Bethany College in Virginia in 1856. He also obtained a master's degree from the same school and later served as a president of the Flemingsburg College in Kentucky. In 1877, he moved to Mexico where he was a pastor until 1880 when he returned to the United States and became a pastor in Kansas City from 1888 to 1892.

Before the Civil War, in which he served as a Confederate chaplain, he was a member of the Whig Party, but afterwards joined the Democratic Party. He later joined the Prohibition Party and served as its Missouri gubernatorial nominee in 1884 and as its vice presidential nominee in 1888.

In 1892, he moved to Memphis, but in 1894 he moved to London and served as a pastor until he returned to Memphis in 1896. On February 3, 1897, he died in Memphis, Tennessee from heart failure and his body was later moved and buried in Kansas City, Missouri.

Party political offices
Preceded by William Daniel	Prohibition nominee for Vice President of the United States; 1888	Succeeded by James B. Cranfill
