= Charles E. Cunningham =

American politician

Charles Cunningham
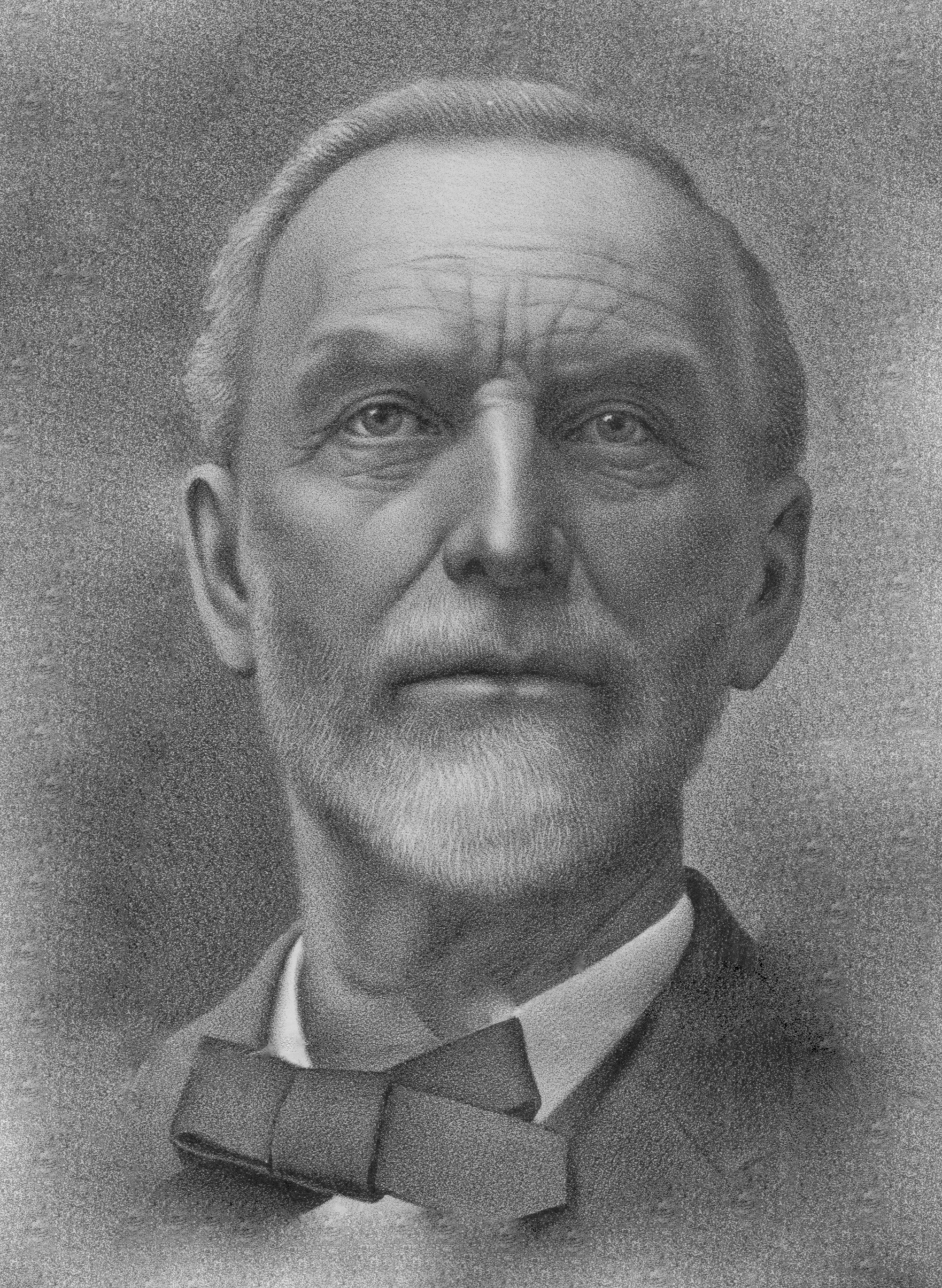

Personal details
- Born: July 1, 1823 Frederick County, Maryland, U.S.
- Died: April 21, 1895 (aged 71) Little Rock, Arkansas, U.S.
- Party: Democratic (Before 1876); Greenback (1876–1886); Agricultural Wheel (1886–1888); Union Labor (1888–1891); Populist (1891–1895)
- Spouse: Elizabeth Jones (1849–1883)
- Children: 8

Charles E. Cunningham (July 1, 1823 – April 21, 1895) was an American politician who is best known for being the Union Labor Party's nominee for Vice President of the United States in the 1888 election.

== Biography ==
Cunningham was born in 1823 in Frederick County, Maryland, to James Cunningham, a retired British military captain, and Catherine Campbell, a native of the state. He had three brothers and a sister. Despite being orphaned in 1834, Cunningham obtained an education and married Elizabeth A. Jones (died 1883) in 1849. They had eight children; Kate, Nannie, Mollie, James, Bessie (married John J. Cockrell, the son of Francis Cockrell), George, Nettie, and Charles.

Cunningham moved to California in 1849 and to Johnson County, Missouri, in 1854. He went to St. Louis, Missouri, in 1862 and moved to Little Rock, Arkansas, after the end of the American Civil War. He began operating a sawmill in Little Rock and served on the school board there from 1873 until 1877. A former Democrat, in 1876 Cunningham joined the Greenback Party, and ran as that party's candidate in the 1882 congressional election, coming in second place to Democrat Clifton R. Breckinridge. He ran for Governor of Arkansas as the candidate of the Agricultural Wheel party in 1886, receiving 11.7 percent of the vote.

Cunningham joined the newly formed Union Labor Party in 1888. At that year's Union Labor National Convention in May, Illinois State Senator Alson Streeter was unanimously nominated as their candidate for president. The vice presidential ballot saw Samuel Evans of Texas receive 124 votes, T. P. Rynder of Pennsylvania received 44, and Cunningham received 32. After Evans declined the party's nomination, Cunningham became the vice presidential candidate. He waited several weeks before accepting the nomination. The ULP ticket received 146,602 votes (1.3%) but did get 11.4% in Kansas and 6.8% in Arkansas.

Cunningham was influential in the forming of the Populist Party in 1891. He was temporary chairman of the May 1891 Populist convention. Cunningham died on April 21, 1895. He is buried in Little Rock at the Oakland-Fraternal Cemetery.

Party political offices
New political party	Union Labor nominee for Vice President of the United States; 1888	Party dissolved
