= Union Labor Party =

- Abbreviation: ULP
- Founded: February 22, 1887; 139 years ago
- Dissolved: 1892; 134 years ago
- Merger of: Anti-Monopoly Party; Farmers' Alliance; Greenback Party; Labor parties
- Succeeded by: People's Party
- Ideology: Agrarianism; Factions: Socialism (US)
- Political position: Left-wing

The Union Labor Party was a political party in the United States during the late nineteenth century. The party was organized at Cincinnati in 1887 as a merger of several agrarian, socialist, and trade union groups, following the success of state and municipal labor parties in the 1886 United States elections. The national party ran Alson Streeter in the 1888 United States presidential election. After 1891, the party was absorbed into the new People's Party.

== History ==
=== Origins ===
In 1884, in Milwaukee, the Milwaukee Trades' Assembly organized a merger of the Greenback Labor Party (GLP) and Anti-Monopoly Party (AMP) into a local People's Party (PP), often called the Populists. This merger was strongly supported by the local socialists.

During the mid-1880s, Knights of Labor (K of L) organizer Robert Schilling had organized more than 40 lodges with over 25,000 members. The K of L and the more radical Central Labor Union, led by Paul Grottkau, agitated heavily for an eight-hour day. In 1886, after the Bay View massacre of a pro-eight-hour rally in Milwaukee and Haymarket affair in Chicago, anti-labor sentiment rose dramatically into a national "red scare". The Milwaukee city council repealed its eight-hour ordinance and a Milwaukee grand jury indicted Schilling, Grottkau, and 47 other men. In response to this repression, the K of L and Schilling took control of the People's Party, which quickly denounced the use of violence by both "fanatical anarchists" and "corrupt politicians" and demanded that "land, money, the means of communication and all public improvements [....] should be owned and controlled by the people."

The Haymarket affair and other red scare repressions led to wave of pro-labor organizing. For example, in New York, the United Labor Party was organized by numerous local unions and left-wing groups, including the CLU, K of L, and the Socialist Labor Party (SLP), and ran Henry George for the 1886 mayoral election. In 34 of 38 states, 4 territories, and 189 towns, workers created a Union Labor Party, United Labor Party, or other similarly-named organization. Historian Leon Fink, describing this era, said that it "may still stand as the American worker’s single greatest push for political power".

=== Early gains ===
At first, the ULP saw striking success, greater than that of any prior US labor party.

In the 1886 elections, the Populists obtained considerable successes, especially in Milwaukee. The Populists elected several members to both the Wisconsin Senate and State Assembly, including Populist president Michael P. Walsh. In the gubernatorial election, the Populist's candidate, John Cochrane, won 7.50% of the vote. In the US House elections, the Populists successfully elected Henry Smith in WI-4 over both a Republican and a Democratic opponent.

Also during the 1886 elections, Samuel I. Hopkins, a Confederate veteran, was elected to Virginia's 6th Congressional District with 51.6% of the vote.

These election victories encouraged the labor movement. Schilling re-organized the People's Party into the Union Labor Party (ULP), which began to organize a fledgling country-wide political apparatus, appointing regional representatives from the Knights of Labor, trade unions, Grangers, the Anti-Monopoly Party, and other pro-labor elements.

=== Decline ===
The ULP soon saw a series of electoral losses, which destroyed its momentum. Across Wisconsin, the ULP won just 2.6 percent of the statewide vote.

In Wisconsin's 1888 US House elections, Henry Smith won both the Democratic and ULP tickets. Despite that advantage, former incumbent Republican Isaac W. Van Schaick defeated Smith, receiving 50.7% of the vote to Smith's 47.3%.

In the 1888 Mayor of Milwaukee election, the ULP ran former alderman Herman Kroeger. Kroeger advocated public ownership of municipal improvements, creation of public baths, and law permitting recall of city officials. Kroeger was such a serious threat that the Republicans and Democrats united to run Thomas Brown as a fusion candidate against him. Kroeger was nearly elected anyway, with 15,033 votes to 15,978 for Brown. Radical Socialist Labor Party (SLP) candidate Colin Campbell, backed by Paul Grottkau (imprisoned editor of the Arbeiter Zeitung) garnered 964 votes, just enough to allow Kroeger to win if they had gone to him instead.

In Virginia, Samuel Hopkins declined to run again.

In Arkansas' 1888 US House election for AR-1, ULP candidate Lewis P. Featherstone ran against Democratic candidate William H. Cate. Cate was initially declared re-elected. However, Featherstone challenged on the grounds of election fraud. Following the Featherstone v. Cate hearings before the US House of Representatives, Featherstone was seated in 1890 and served until 1891. In 1890, he lost his bid for re-election. The local ULP also endorsed John M. Clayton, whose election was fraudulently stolen and who was assassinated.

=== Merger with Populists ===
Despite these losses, Schilling continued his fight for a national farmer-labor alliance and a national party.

In May 1891, Schilling was a delegate to the Farmers' Alliance Cincinnati convention that laid the groundwork for a national People's Party, where he was appointed as secretary of the National Executive Committee. Weeks later, the ULP was again reorganized into the Wisconsin People's Party, or Wisconsin Populist Party.

In February 1892, the national People's Party, also often called the Populists, was created by a broad coalition, including Edward Bellamy and his Nationalist Clubs, Henry George, and current and former members of various smaller parties: The ULP, the Greenback Party, Prohibition Party, Anti-Monopoly Party, Labor Reform Party, Union Labor Party, United Labor Party, and other minor left-leaning parties. The new party's program was largely taken from the platforms of the 1886 People's Party and 1886 ULP.

== See also ==
- Duluth Union Labor Party
