= Alson Streeter =

American farmer, miner, and politician (1823–1901)

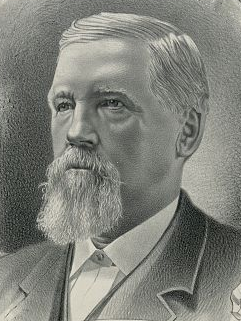

Member of the Illinois Senate from the 24th district
- In office 1885–1888
- Preceded by: John Fletcher
- Succeeded by: Orville F. Berry

Member of the Illinois House of Representatives from the 22nd district
- In office 1873–1874

Personal details
- Born: Alson Jenness Streeter; January 18, 1823 Berlin, New York, U.S.
- Died: November 24, 1901 (aged 78) New Windsor, Illinois, U.S.
- Party: Democratic
- Other political affiliations: Greenback (1880); Anti-Monopoly Party (1884); Union Labor Party (1888)
- Spouse(s): Deborah Boone; Susan Menold
- Children: 7
- Parents: Roswell Streeter (father); Eleanor Kenyon (mother)
- Education: Knox College

Alson Jenness Streeter (January 18, 1823 – November 24, 1901) was an American farmer, miner and politician who was the Union Labor Party nominee in the United States presidential election of 1888. He was also an early member of the National Grange of the Order of Patrons of Husbandry following its foundation in the 1860s and supported Granger Laws while in office.

== Early life and education ==
Alson Streeter was born on January 18, 1823, in Rensselaer County, New York, to Eleanor Kenyon and Roswell Streeter. The family later moved to Allegany County, New York in 1827 and Lee County, Illinois in 1836. He lived with his parents until his father's death in 1840, after which he became a miner and farmer. He attended Knox College in Illinois in 1846 and graduated in 1849.

== Career ==
In 1849, he moved to California, but returned to Illinois in 1851. In 1853 and 1854, he returned to California for a short time to drive cattle.

During the Civil War, he supported the War Democrat faction of the Democratic Party. In the 1860s, he entered politics as an unsuccessful candidate for Illinois General Assembly. In 1862, he joined the Mercer County Board of Supervisors. Streeter was elected as a Democratic member of the Illinois House of Representatives for the 1873–1874 session from Mercer County. In 1874, he became a member of the recently founded Greenback Party.

In 1878, he was the Greenback nominee for Congress for Illinois's 10th congressional district, and was the party's nominee for Governor of Illinois in 1880, coming in third with over 28,000 votes. In 1884, he won election to the Illinois State Senate under a Greenback-Democratic fusion ticket and served until 1888. In the 1891 United States Senate election, he was narrowly defeated by former Governor John M. Palmer for Illinois' seat in the United States Senate by eleven votes.

In 1884, he served as the temporary chairman of the recently founded Anti-Monopoly Party. In the 1888 presidential election, he won the Union Labor Party's nomination by acclamation on the first ballot of the 1888 Union Labor National Convention, with Charles E. Cunningham selected as his running mate. Streeter and Cunningham finished fourth in a field of six in the election, garnering 149,115 votes or 1.31 percent of the nationwide total.

== Personal life ==
He was married twice, to Deborah Boone Streeter and Susan Menold Streeter. Streeter had three sons and four daughters.

On November 24, 1901, Streeter died at his home in New Windsor, Illinois from diabetes and was interred in New Windsor Cemetery in Mercer County, Illinois.

== Electoral history ==
1878 Illinois Tenth Congressional District election
| Party | Candidate | Votes | % | ±% |
|---|---|---|---|---|
| Republican | Benjamin F. Marsh | 11,814 | 44.50% | −6.59% |
| Democratic | Delos P. Phelps | 11,238 | 42.33% | −6.05% |
| Greenback | Alson Streeter | 3,496 | 13.17% | +12.64% |
| Total votes | | 26,548 | 100.00% | |

1880 Illinois Gubernatorial election
| Party | Candidate | Votes | % | ±% |
|---|---|---|---|---|
| Republican | Shelby Moore Cullom | 314,565 | 50.57% | −0.01% |
| Democratic | Lyman Trumbull | 277,532 | 44.61% | −4.74% |
| Greenback | Alson Streeter | 28,898 | 4.65% | +4.65% |
| N/A | Other | 953 | 0.15% | |
| Prohibition | Uriah Copp Jr. (write-in) | 122 | 0.02% | −0.01% |
| Total votes | | 622,070 | 100.00% | |

1888 United States presidential election
| Party | Candidate | Votes | % | ±% |
|---|---|---|---|---|
| Republican | Benjamin Harrison | 5,443,892 | 47.80% | −0.48% |
| Democratic | Grover Cleveland | 5,534,488 | 48.63% | −0.22% |
| Prohibition | Clinton B. Fisk | 249,819 | 2.20% | +0.70% |
| Labor | Alson Streeter | 146,602 | 1.31% | +1.31% |
| N/A | Other | 3,203 | -0.01% | |
| Socialist Labor | Slate of unpledged electors | 2,068 | 0.02% | +0.02% |
| Independent | James Curtis | 1,615 | 0.01% | +0.01% |
| Independent | Robert Cowdrey | 1,032 | 0.01% | +0.01% |
| Total votes | | 11,383,320 | 100.00% | |

1891 Illinois Senate election first ballot
| Party | Candidate | Votes | % | ±% |
|---|---|---|---|---|
| Democratic | John M. Palmer | 101 | 49.51% | |
| Republican | Richard J. Oglesby | 100 | 49.02% | |
| Populist | Alson Streeter | 3 | 1.47% | |
| Total votes | | 204 | 100.00% | |

1891 Illinois Senate election second ballot
| Party | Candidate | Votes | % | ±% |
|---|---|---|---|---|
| Democratic | John M. Palmer | 103 | 50.49% | |
| Populist | Alson Streeter | 92 | 45.10% | |
| Republican | Richard J. Oglesby | 9 | 4.41% | |
| Total votes | | 204 | 100.00% | |

Party political offices
| New political party | Union Labor nominee for President of the United States; 1888 | Party dissolved |
