= Clinton B. Fisk =

Union Army general

Clinton Fisk
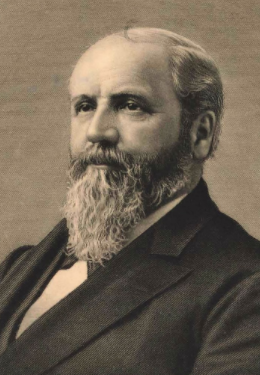

Personal details
- Born: Clinton Bowen Fisk; December 8, 1828 York, New York, U.S.
- Died: July 9, 1890 (aged 61) New York City, New York, U.S.
- Party: Prohibition
- Spouse: Jeannette C. Crippen
- Children: 3
- Parents: Benjamin Bigford Fisk (father); Lydia Aldrich Powell (mother)
- Education: Hillsdale College

Military service
- Allegiance: United States of America
- Branch/service: Union Army
- Years of service: 1862–1865
- Rank: Brigadier General; Brevet Major General
- Unit: 33rd Missouri Volunteer Infantry; Army of the Tennessee
- Battles/wars: American Civil War

Clinton Bowen Fisk (December 8, 1828 – July 9, 1890) was an American senior officer during Reconstruction in the Bureau of Refugees, Freedmen and Abandoned Lands and served as the Prohibition Party's presidential candidate during the 1888 presidential election. Fisk University was named in his honor after he endowed it with $30,000. In addition, he helped establish the first free public schools in the Southern United States for white and African-American children.

== Life ==
=== Early life ===
Clinton Bowen Fisk was born on December 8, 1828, in York, Livingston County, New York, to Benjamin Bigford Fisk and Lydia Aldrich Powell. As part of the 19th-century westward migration, his family soon moved to Coldwater, Michigan. He studied in the preliminary course at Albion Seminary before becoming one of the five students to matriculate on the opening day of Michigan Central College in 1844. Fisk later became a merchant, miller, and banker in Coldwater, but suffered financial disaster in the Panic of 1857. In 1859, he moved to St. Louis, Missouri, where he started working in the insurance business.

=== Civil War ===
After the start of the Civil War, Fisk joined the Union Army in 1861 as a private and was appointed colonel of the 33rd Missouri Volunteer Infantry of the Union Army on September 5, 1862. He was later commissioned as brigadier general in charge of a brigade on November 24, 1862, and also served on Major General George Armstrong Custer's staff. He served most of the American Civil War in Missouri and Arkansas, commanding first the District of Southeast Missouri and later the Department of North Missouri to opposing raids into Missouri by Confederate cavalry and guerrillas. In 1865 he was promoted to brevet major general.

=== Freedmen's Bureau and Fisk University ===
After the Civil War, Fisk was appointed assistant commissioner of the Freedmen's Bureau for Kentucky and Tennessee under the command of Oliver Otis Howard. He worked through the Bureau of Refugees, Freedmen and Abandoned Lands and the American Missionary Association to establish the first free schools in the American South for both black and white children. He made the abandoned barracks in Nashville, Tennessee, available to the American Missionary Association for the creation of the Fisk School, and endowed it with a total of $30,000.

=== Politics ===
After authorizing legislation expired for the Freedmen's Bureau, Fisk returned to his native New York, where he returned to banking. In 1874, President Ulysses S. Grant appointed him to the Board of Indian Commissioners.

He was a zealous leader of the prohibition movement. In 1886 he ran for governor of New Jersey with the Prohibition nomination. During the 1888 presidential election he was the Prohibition Party's presidential nominee, receiving the nomination by acclamation on June 6, 1888. He was warned that he might be a spoiler candidate who would prevent Benjamin Harrison from winning, as John St. John was said to have done to James G. Blaine in 1884. Harrison won the election, though he did not win the national popular vote. "General," said one Republican to Fisk, "if I should vote for this [prohibition] bill it would lay me in my political grave." "Vote for it and die, then," Fisk responded, "and I will write on your tombstone, 'Blessed are the dead that die in the Lord'"

=== Death and legacy ===
Fisk died in New York City on July 9, 1890, from influenza and was buried in Coldwater, Michigan. Prohibition Park, a planned community on Staten Island, New York, named one of its major streets Clinton B. Fisk Avenue in his honor. The name remains, although the community changed its name to Westerleigh. In 2001, he was the first to be inducted into the new Hillsdale County, Michigan Veterans' Hall of Fame for his distinguished service in the American Civil War. (Hall of Fame inductee 001, Civil War inductee 001.)

== Electoral history ==
1886 New Jersey gubernatorial election
Party	Candidate	Votes	%	±%
Democratic	Robert Stockton Green	109,939	47.44%	−2.49%
Republican	Benjamin Franklin Howey	101,919	43.98%	−2.67%
Prohibition	Clinton B. Fisk	19,808	8.55%	+6.55%
N/A	Other	73	0.03%	+0.03%
Total votes		231,739	100.00%	

== See also ==
- List of American Civil War generals (Union)

Party political offices
Preceded by John St. John	Prohibition nominee for President of the United States; 1888	Succeeded by John Bidwell
