= 1864 United States presidential election in Kansas =

- November 8, 1864

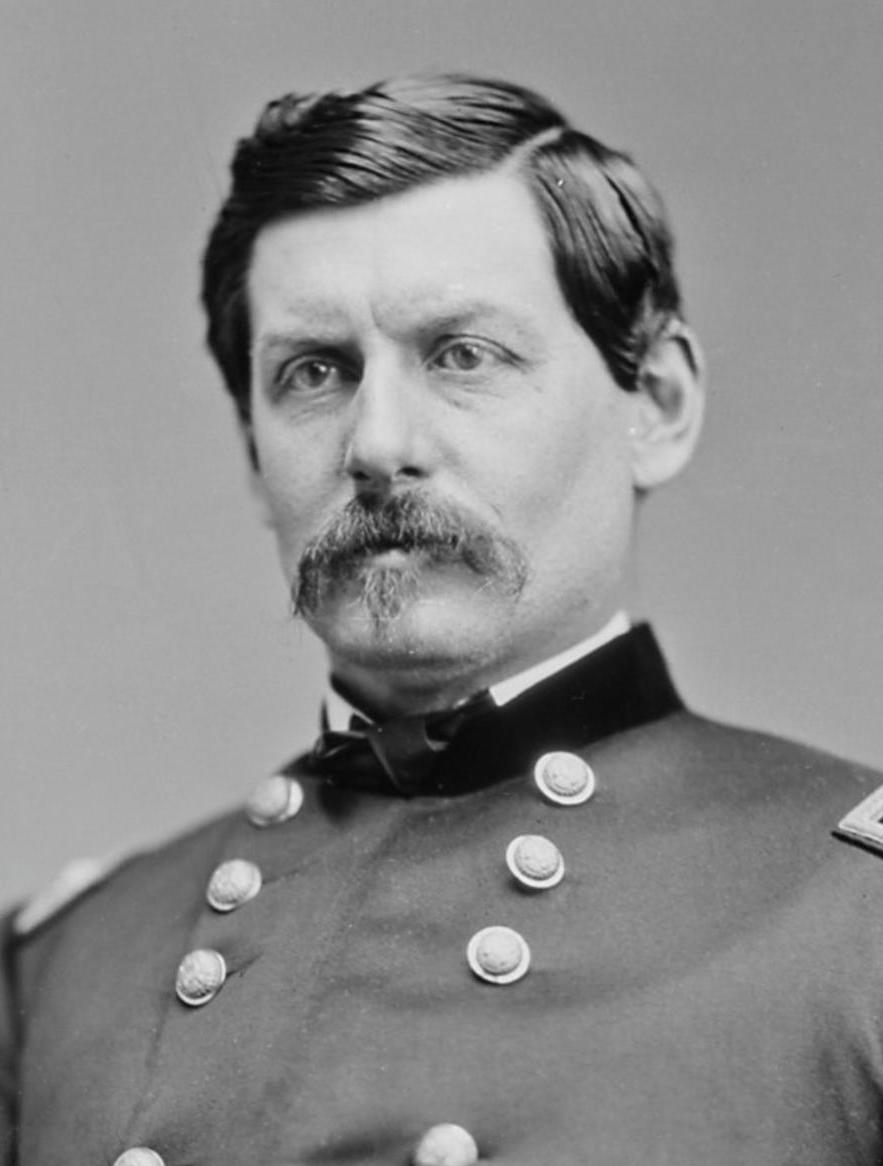
Nominee	Abraham Lincoln	George B. McClellan
Party	National Union	Democratic
Home state	Illinois	New Jersey
Running mate	Andrew Johnson	George H. Pendleton
Electoral vote	3	0
Popular vote	17,089	3,836
Percentage	81.67%	18.33%
County results
Lincoln
60–70%
70–80%
80–90%
90–100%
McClellan
50–60%
President before election
Abraham Lincoln
Republican
Elected President
Abraham Lincoln
National Union

The 1864 United States presidential election in Kansas took place on November 8, 1864, as part of the 1864 United States presidential election. State voters chose three representatives, or electors, to the Electoral College, who voted for president and vice president.

This was the first presidential election in which Kansas participated, following its admission as the 34th state on January 29, 1861. The National Union ticket of incumbent President Abraham Lincoln and Tennessee Governor Andrew Johnson defeated the Democratic ticket of former Commanding General of the United States Army George B. McClellan and U.S. Representative George H. Pendleton and carried Kansas's three electoral votes. Lincoln and Johnson carried the state by a landslide margin of 63%.

With more than 81% of the popular vote, Lincoln's victory in the state was his strongest victory in the country in terms of his share of the popular vote, and the strongest performance by any presidential candidate in Kansas.

In addition to the votes cast for the regular electoral tickets pledged to Lincoln and McClellan, 655 votes were cast for Ellsworth Cheeseborough (Note: Sometimes spelled Cheesebrough or Chesebrough.) of Atchison County. Some tertiary sources, such as Dave Leip's Atlas of U.S. Presidential Elections, count these as votes for independent or write-in candidates. (Note: Leip counts 543 votes for Cheeseborough and 112 write-in votes; on inspection of the original returns published in the Annals of Kansas (p. 390), it appears these represent the soldier and civilian totals for Cheeseborough, which were tabulated separately.) In fact, Cheeseborough was an elector nominated on the National Union ticket who died prior to the election. Nineteenth century election laws required voters to vote directly for members of the Electoral College, whose names appeared on tickets printed and circulated by the parties alongside the nominees for president and vice president. This sometimes resulted in small differences in the number of votes cast for electors pledged to the same presidential candidate if some voters did not vote for all the electors nominated by a party, or if one or several electors were replaced close to the election. Following Cheeseborough's death, the National Union Party substituted Thomas Moonlight and W. F. Cloud as candidates for the Electoral College from Kansas. (Nelson McCracken, the second elector on the National Union ticket, had also died in the interim.) Nevertheless, Cheeseborough's name continued to appear on printed tickets as a National Union candidate for elector in the final days before the election. A small number of tickets featuring Cheeseborough were cast, and these were counted separately from votes for the substitute National Union ticket.

== Results ==
1864 United States presidential election in Kansas
Party	Candidate	Votes	%
National Union	Abraham Lincoln (incumbent)	17,089	81.67
Democratic	George B. McClellan	3,836	18.33
Total votes		20,923	100%

=== Results by elector ===
1864 United States presidential election in Kansas
Party	Candidate	Votes	%
National Union	Robert McBratney	17,029	27.20
National Union	W. F. McCloud	16,814	26.86
National Union	Thomas Moonlight	10,431	16.66
National Union (Anti-Lane)	Marcus J. Parrott	6,203	9.91
Democratic	Nelson Cobb	3,836	6.13
Democratic	Andrew Ege	3,828	6.11
Democratic	Thomas Bridgens	3,807	6.08
National Union	Ellsworth Cheeseborough †	655	1.01

== See also ==
- United States presidential elections in Kansas
