= List of United States major party presidential tickets =

In the United States, political parties nominate one candidate each for President of the United States and for Vice President of the United States. These candidates attempt to win presidential elections by taking a majority of the electoral vote. The two candidates together are known as a ticket. Many states did not hold popular votes for the presidential election prior to the advent of Jacksonian Democracy in the 1820s. Prior to the ratification of the 12th Amendment in 1804, electors cast two votes for president rather than one vote for president and one vote for vice president. Under the pre-12th Amendment Constitution, the candidate with the most votes became president and the candidate with the second most votes became vice president; hence, all candidates were technically running against each other. (Note: For a full list of candidates that received electoral votes, see List of people who received an electoral vote in the United States Electoral College.) The listed ages are as of election day; for races prior to 1845, December 1 is considered election day for the purposes of the list.

== Major tickets ==
Included below are all of the major party (Democratic-Republican, Federalist, Democratic, National Republican, Whig, and Republican) presidential tickets in U.S. history, along with the nonpartisan candidacy of George Washington. Also included are independent and third party tickets that won at least ten percent of the popular or electoral vote.

An asterisk (*) denotes elections held before the ratification of the 12th Amendment, which made significant changes to the presidential election process. (Note: In elections held before the ratification of the 12th Amendment, each elector cast two electoral votes for president. For these elections, the party's candidate that received the most electoral votes is assigned the position of presidential nominee for the purposes of the table, while the party's candidate that won the second most electoral votes is assigned the position of vice presidential nominee. For these elections, the "electoral vote percentage" column reflects the percentage of electors won by the presidential candidate, rather than the percentage of electoral votes won.) An asterisk or caret (^) denotes elections held before 1832; before 1832, many states did not hold a popular vote for president.

			Presidential nominee					Vice presidential nominee					Results (Note: The results columns reflect the presidential vote. The last column (marked "R") indicates the presidential nominee's ranking in number of electoral votes in that election, with the popular vote breaking ties, with the exception that any presidential election winner is always ranked first.)		
Year	T (Note: This column indicates the type of candidacy. An "I" indicates an incumbent president, "C" indicates a challenger to an incumbent, "O" indicates an open seat (meaning there was no incumbent in the race), and "T" indicates a (post-1800) third party or independent ticket.)	P	Position (Note: The candidate's most recently held elected or senior appointive position on election day. If they did not hold such a position, their occupation is listed instead. For elections held prior to the 1848 presidential election (the first election with a national election day), the column reflects the candidate's position or occupation on November 1st of the year of the election.)	Name	S	B	A (Note: The candidate's age on election day. For elections held prior to the 1848 presidential election (the first election with a national election day), the column reflects the candidate's age on November 1st of the year of the election.)	Position	Name	S	B	A	PV%	EV%	R
2024	O	R	Fmr. President	Donald Trump	FL	1946	78	Senator	JD Vance	OH	1984	40	49.8	58	1
2024	O	D	Vice President	Kamala Harris	CA	1964	60	Governor	Tim Walz	MN	1964	60	48.3	42	2
2020	C	D	Fmr. Vice President	Joe Biden	DE	1942	77	Senator	Kamala Harris	CA	1964	56	51.3	56.9	1
2020	I	R	President	Donald Trump	FL	1946	74	Vice President	Mike Pence	IN	1959	61	46.8	43.1	2
2016	O	R	Businessman	Donald Trump	NY	1946	70	Governor	Mike Pence	IN	1959	57	46.1	56.5	1
2016	O	D	Fmr. Sec. of State	Hillary Clinton	NY	1947	69	Senator	Tim Kaine	VA	1958	58	48.2	42.2	2
2012	I	D	President	Barack Obama	IL	1961	51	Vice President	Joe Biden	DE	1942	69	51	61.7	1
2012	C	R	Fmr. Governor	Mitt Romney	MA	1947	65	Representative	Paul Ryan	WI	1970	42	47.2	38.3	2
2008	O	D	Senator	Barack Obama	IL	1961	47	Senator	Joe Biden	DE	1942	65	52.9	67.8	1
2008	O	R	Senator	John McCain	AZ	1936	72	Governor	Sarah Palin	AK	1964	44	45.6	32.2	2
2004	I	R	President	George W. Bush	TX	1946	58	Vice President	Dick Cheney	WY	1941	63	50.7	53.2	1
2004	C	D	Senator	John Kerry	MA	1943	60	Senator	John Edwards	NC	1953	51	48.3	46.7	2
2000	O	R	Governor	George W. Bush	TX	1946	54	Fmr. Sec. of Defense	Dick Cheney	WY	1941	59	47.9	50.4	1
2000	O	D	Vice President	Al Gore	TN	1948	52	Senator	Joe Lieberman	CT	1942	58	48.4	49.4	2
1996	I	D	President	Bill Clinton	AR	1946	50	Vice President	Al Gore	TN	1948	48	49.2	70.4	1
1996	C	R	Fmr. Senator	Bob Dole	KS	1923	73	Fmr. Sec. of HUD	Jack Kemp	NY	1935	61	40.7	29.6	2
1992	C	D	Governor	Bill Clinton	AR	1946	46	Senator	Al Gore	TN	1948	44	43	68.8	1
1992	I	R	President	George H. W. Bush	TX	1924	68	Vice President	Dan Quayle	IN	1947	45	37.5	31.2	2
1992	T	I	Businessman	Ross Perot	TX	1930	62	Admiral	James Stockdale	CA	1923	68	18.9	0	3
1988	O	R	Vice President	George H. W. Bush	TX	1924	64	Senator	Dan Quayle	IN	1947	41	53.4	79.2	1
1988	O	D	Governor	Michael Dukakis	MA	1933	55	Senator	Lloyd Bentsen	TX	1921	67	45.7	20.1	2
1984	I	R	President	Ronald Reagan	CA	1911	73	Vice President	George H. W. Bush	TX	1924	60	58.8	97.6	1
1984	C	D	Fmr. Vice President	Walter Mondale	MN	1928	56	Representative	Geraldine Ferraro	NY	1935	49	40.6	2.4	2
1980	C	R	Fmr. Governor	Ronald Reagan	CA	1911	69	Fmr. DCI	George H. W. Bush	TX	1924	56	50.8	90.9	1
1980	I	D	President	Jimmy Carter	GA	1924	56	Vice President	Walter Mondale	MN	1928	52	41	9.1	2
1976	C	D	Fmr. Governor	Jimmy Carter	GA	1924	52	Senator	Walter Mondale	MN	1928	48	50.1	53.9	1
1976	I	R	President	Gerald Ford	MI	1913	63	Senator	Bob Dole	KS	1923	53	48	44.6	2
1972	I	R	President	Richard Nixon	CA	1913	59	Vice President	Spiro Agnew	MD	1918	53	60.6	96.7	1
1972	C	D	Senator	George McGovern	SD	1922	50	Fmr. Ambassador	Sargent Shriver (Note: Shriver replaced the original Democratic vice presidential nominee, Missouri Senator Thomas Eagleton, after the latter withdrew from the ticket. Eagleton remains the only major party nominee to withdraw from the ticket after being nominated.)	MD	1915	56	37.5	3.2	2
1968	O	R	Fmr. Vice President	Richard Nixon	NY	1913	55	Governor	Spiro Agnew	MD	1918	49	43.4	55.9	1
1968	O	D	Vice President	Hubert Humphrey	MN	1911	57	Senator	Edmund Muskie	ME	1914	54	42.7	35.5	2
1968	T	AI	Fmr. Governor	George Wallace	AL	1919	49	General	Curtis LeMay	CA	1906	61	13.5	8.6	3
1964	I	D	President	Lyndon B. Johnson	TX	1908	56	Senator	Hubert Humphrey	MN	1911	53	61.1	90.3	1
1964	C	R	Senator	Barry Goldwater	AZ	1909	55	Representative	William E. Miller	NY	1914	50	38.5	9.7	2
1960	O	D	Senator	John F. Kennedy	MA	1917	43	Senator	Lyndon B. Johnson	TX	1908	52	49.7	56.4	1
1960	O	R	Vice President	Richard Nixon	CA	1913	47	Fmr. Ambassador	Henry Cabot Lodge Jr.	MA	1902	58	49.6	40.8	2
1956	I	R	President	Dwight D. Eisenhower	PA	1890	66	Vice President	Richard Nixon	CA	1913	43	57.4	86.1	1
1956	C	D	Fmr. Governor	Adlai Stevenson II	IL	1900	56	Senator	Estes Kefauver	TN	1903	53	42	13.7	2
1952	O	R	General	Dwight D. Eisenhower	NY	1890	62	Senator	Richard Nixon	CA	1913	39	55.2	83.2	1
1952	O	D	Governor	Adlai Stevenson II	IL	1900	52	Senator	John Sparkman	AL	1899	52	44.2	16.8	2
1948	I	D	President	Harry S. Truman	MO	1884	64	Senator	Alben W. Barkley	KY	1877	70	49.6	57.1	1
1948	C	R	Governor	Thomas E. Dewey	NY	1902	46	Governor	Earl Warren	CA	1891	57	45.1	35.6	2
1944	I	D	President	Franklin D. Roosevelt	NY	1882	62	Senator	Harry S. Truman	MO	1884	60	53.4	81.4	1
1944	C	R	Governor	Thomas E. Dewey	NY	1902	42	Governor	John W. Bricker	OH	1893	51	45.3	18.6	2
1940	I	D	President	Franklin D. Roosevelt	NY	1882	58	Fmr. Sec. of Agriculture	Henry A. Wallace	IA	1888	52	54.7	84.6	1
1940	C	R	Businessman	Wendell Willkie	NY	1892	48	Senator	Charles L. McNary	OR	1874	66	44.8	15.4	2
1936	I	D	President	Franklin D. Roosevelt	NY	1882	54	Vice President	John Nance Garner	TX	1868	67	60.8	98.5	1
1936	C	R	Governor	Alf Landon	KS	1887	49	Publisher	Frank Knox	IL	1874	62	36.5	1.5	2
1932	C	D	Governor	Franklin D. Roosevelt	NY	1882	50	Speaker	John Nance Garner	TX	1868	63	57.4	88.9	1
1932	I	R	President	Herbert Hoover	CA	1874	58	Vice President	Charles Curtis	KS	1860	72	39.7	11.1	2
1928	O	R	Fmr. Sec. of Commerce	Herbert Hoover	CA	1874	54	Senator	Charles Curtis	KS	1860	68	58.2	83.6	1
1928	O	D	Governor	Al Smith	NY	1873	54	Senator	Joseph T. Robinson	AR	1872	56	40.8	16.4	2
1924	I	R	President	Calvin Coolidge	MA	1872	52	Fmr. Budget Director	Charles G. Dawes	IL	1865	59	54	71.9	1
1924	C	D	Fmr. Ambassador	John W. Davis	WV	1873	51	Governor	Charles W. Bryan	NE	1867	57	28.8	25.6	2
1924	T	P	Senator	Robert M. La Follette	WI	1855	69	Senator	Burton K. Wheeler	MT	1882	42	16.6	2.4	3
1920	O	R	Senator	Warren G. Harding	OH	1865	55	Governor	Calvin Coolidge	MA	1872	48	60.3	76.1	1
1920	O	D	Governor	James M. Cox	OH	1870	50	Fmr. Ast. Sec. of Navy	Franklin D. Roosevelt	NY	1882	38	34.2	23.9	2
1916	I	D	President	Woodrow Wilson	NJ	1856	59	Vice President	Thomas R. Marshall	IN	1854	62	49.2	52.2	1
1916	C	R	Fmr. Associate Justice	Charles Evans Hughes	NY	1862	54	Fmr. Vice President	Charles W. Fairbanks	IN	1852	64	46.1	47.8	2
1912	C	D	Governor	Woodrow Wilson	NJ	1856	55	Governor	Thomas R. Marshall	IN	1854	58	41.8	81.9	1
1912	T	P	Fmr. President	Theodore Roosevelt	NY	1858	54	Governor	Hiram Johnson	CA	1866	46	27.4	16.6	2
1912	I	R	President	William Howard Taft	OH	1857	55	Vice President	James S. Sherman (Note: Sherman died before election day, and Nicholas M. Butler received the electoral votes that would have gone to Sherman had he lived.)	NY	1855	57	23.2	1.5	3
1908	O	R	Fmr. Sec. of War	William Howard Taft	OH	1857	51	Representative	James S. Sherman	NY	1855	53	51.5	66.5	1
1908	O	D	Fmr. Representative	William Jennings Bryan	NE	1860	48	Fmr. state senator	John W. Kern	IN	1849	58	43	33.5	2
1904	I	R	President	Theodore Roosevelt	NY	1858	46	Senator	Charles W. Fairbanks	IN	1852	52	56.4	70.6	1
1904	C	D	Fmr. State Judge	Alton B. Parker	NY	1852	52	Fmr. Senator	Henry G. Davis	WV	1823	80	37.6	29.4	2
1900	I	R	President	William McKinley	OH	1843	57	Governor	Theodore Roosevelt	NY	1858	42	51.6	65.3	1
1900	C	D	Fmr. Representative	William Jennings Bryan	NE	1860	40	Fmr. Vice President	Adlai Stevenson I	IL	1835	65	45.5	34.7	2
1896	O	R	Fmr. Governor	William McKinley	OH	1843	53	Fmr. state senator	Garret Hobart	NJ	1844	52	51	60.1	1
1896	O	D	Fmr. Representative	William Jennings Bryan (Note: Bryan was also the Populist nominee in 1896; Thomas E. Watson was his running mate on the Populist ticket. Bryan's popular and electoral vote numbers reflect his combined vote on both the Democratic and Populist tickets.)	NE	1860	36	Businessman	Arthur Sewall	ME	1835	60	46.7	39.4	2
1892	C	D	Fmr. President	Grover Cleveland	NY	1837	55	Fmr. Asst. PMG	Adlai Stevenson I	IL	1835	57	46	62.4	1
1892	I	R	President	Benjamin Harrison	IN	1833	59	Fmr. Ambassador	Whitelaw Reid	NY	1837	55	43	32.7	2
1888	C	R	Fmr. Senator	Benjamin Harrison	IN	1833	55	Fmr. Ambassador	Levi P. Morton	NY	1824	64	47.8	58.1	1
1888	I	D	President	Grover Cleveland	NY	1837	51	Fmr. Senator	Allen G. Thurman	OH	1813	74	48.6	41.9	2
1884	O	D	Governor	Grover Cleveland	NY	1837	47	Fmr. Governor	Thomas A. Hendricks	IN	1819	65	48.9	54.6	1
1884	O	R	Fmr. Sec. of State	James G. Blaine	ME	1830	54	Senator	John A. Logan	IL	1826	58	48.3	45.4	2
1880	O	R	Representative	James A. Garfield	OH	1831	49	Fmr. Port Collector	Chester A. Arthur	NY	1829	51	48.3	58	1
1880	O	D	General	Winfield S. Hancock	PA	1824	55	Fmr. Representative	William H. English	IN	1822	58	48.2	42	2
1876	O	R	Governor	Rutherford B. Hayes	OH	1822	54	Representative	William A. Wheeler	NY	1819	57	47.9	50.1	1
1876	O	D	Governor	Samuel J. Tilden	NY	1814	62	Governor	Thomas A. Hendricks	IN	1819	57	50.9	49.9	2
1872	I	R	President	Ulysses S. Grant	IL	1822	50	Senator	Henry Wilson	MA	1812	60	55.6	81.3	1
1872	C	LR/D	Fmr. Representative	Horace Greeley (Note: Greeley and Brown were nominated by the Liberal Republican Party and were subsequently nominated by the Democratic Party at their national convention. Greeley died shortly after the election, but before the electoral votes were cast. Most of the electoral votes that would have been cast for Greeley instead went to former Indiana Senator Thomas A. Hendricks or Benjamin Gratz Brown. Greeley's EV% reflects what he would have won had he lived and if there were no faithless electors.)	NY	1811	61	Governor	Benjamin G. Brown	MO	1826	46	43.8	18.8	2
1868	O	R	General	Ulysses S. Grant	IL	1822	46	Speaker	Schuyler Colfax	IN	1823	45	52.7	72.8	1
1868	O	D	Fmr. Governor	Horatio Seymour	NY	1810	58	Fmr. Representative	Francis P. Blair Jr.	MO	1821	47	47.3	27.2	2
1864	I	NU (Note: Lincoln and Johnson were nominated by a coalition of Republicans, War Democrats, and border state Unionists that called itself the National Union Party.)	President	Abraham Lincoln	IL	1809	55	Military Governor	Andrew Johnson	TN	1808	55	55	91	1
1864	C	D	General	George B. McClellan	NJ	1826	37	Representative	George H. Pendleton	OH	1825	39	45	9	2
1860	O	R	Fmr. Representative	Abraham Lincoln	IL	1809	51	Senator	Hannibal Hamlin	ME	1809	51	39.7	59.4	1
1860	O	SD	Vice President	John C. Breckinridge (Note: The Democratic Party held three national conventions in 1860. The first produced a deadlock and the second nominated Douglas. A group of Southern Democrats bolted from the second convention and held a third convention, which nominated Breckinridge. The Breckinridge-Lane ticket is often labelled as the "Southern Democratic" ticket while the Douglas-Johnson ticket is sometimes labelled as the "Northern Democratic" ticket.)	KY	1821	39	Senator	Joseph Lane	OR	1801	58	18.2	23.8	2
1860	T	CU	Fmr. Senator	John Bell	TN	1796	64	Fmr. Sec. of State	Edward Everett	MA	1794	66	12.6	12.9	3
1860	O	ND	Senator	Stephen A. Douglas	IL	1813	47	Fmr. Governor	Herschel V. Johnson	GA	1812	48	29.5	4	4
1856	O	D	Fmr. Ambassador	James Buchanan	PA	1791	65	Fmr. Representative	John C. Breckinridge	KY	1821	35	45.3	58.8	1
1856	O	R	Fmr. Senator	John C. Frémont	CA	1813	43	Fmr. Senator	William L. Dayton	NJ	1807	49	33.1	38.5	2
1856	O	A/W	Fmr. President	Millard Fillmore	NY	1800	56	Fmr. Ambassador	Andrew J. Donelson	TN	1799	57	21.5	2.7	3
1852	O	D	Fmr. Senator	Franklin Pierce	NH	1804	48	Senator	William R. King	AL	1786	66	50.8	85.8	1
1852	O	W	General	Winfield Scott	NJ	1786	66	Fmr. Sec. of the Navy	William A. Graham	NC	1804	48	43.9	14.2	2
1848	O	W	General	Zachary Taylor	LA	1784	63	Comptroller	Millard Fillmore	NY	1800	48	47.3	56.2	1
1848	O	D	Fmr. Senator	Lewis Cass	MI	1782	66	Fmr. Representative	William O. Butler	KY	1791	57	42.5	43.8	2
1848	T	FS	Fmr. President	Martin Van Buren	NY	1782	65	Fmr. state senator	Charles F. Adams Sr.	MA	1807	41	10.1	0	3
1844	O	D	Fmr. Governor	James K. Polk	TN	1795	49	Fmr. Ambassador	George Dallas	PA	1792	52	49.5	61.8	1
1844	O	W	Fmr. Senator	Henry Clay	KY	1777	67	Fmr. Mayor	Theodore Frelinghuysen	NJ	1787	57	48.1	38.2	2
1840	C	W	Fmr. Ambassador	William Henry Harrison	OH	1773	67	Fmr. Senator	John Tyler	VA	1790	50	52.9	79.6	1
1840	I	D	President	Martin Van Buren	NY	1782	57	-	None (Note: Van Buren campaigned without a running mate as the party refused to re-nominate Vice President Richard Mentor Johnson but was unable to agree on an alternative. A majority of Van Buren's electors ultimately cast their vice presidential vote for Johnson.)	-	-	-	46.8	20.4	2
1836	O	D	Vice President	Martin Van Buren	NY	1782	53	Representative	Richard M. Johnson (Note: Though Van Buren won a majority of electoral votes, Johnson only won a plurality as Virginia's electors voted for Van Buren for president and William Smith for vice president. Under the terms of the 12th Amendment, the Senate held a contingent election to elect the vice president, which Johnson won.)	KY	1780	56	50.8	57.8	1
1836	O	W	Fmr. Ambassador	William Henry Harrison (Note: As the Whig Party was unable to unite around a single candidate, three Whigs ran for president in the 1836 presidential election; there was only one Whig ticket in each state. William Henry Harrison was the Whig candidate in fifteen states, most of which were in the North, Hugh Lawson White was the Whig candidate in nine states, all of which were in the South, and Daniel Webster was the Whig candidate in Massachusetts. Additionally, Willie Person Mangum received the electoral votes of South Carolina, where the legislature determined the allocation of electoral votes. Despite facing multiple opponents, Democrat Martin Van Buren won re-election with a majority of the electoral vote.)	OH	1773	63	Representative	Francis Granger (Note: Whigs electors split their votes among two vice presidential candidates in 1836. Francis Granger won most of the votes cast by electors that voted for Harrison or Webster, while John Tyler won most of the votes of the White and Mangum electors.)	NY	1792	44	36.6	24.8	2
1832	I	D	President	Andrew Jackson	TN	1767	65	Fmr. Ambassador	Martin Van Buren	NY	1782	49	54.2	76.6	1
1832	C	NR	Senator	Henry Clay	KY	1777	55	Fmr. Representative	John Sergeant	PA	1779	52	37.4	17.1	2
1828^	C	D	Fmr. Senator	Andrew Jackson	TN	1767	61	Vice President	John C. Calhoun	SC	1782	46	56	68.2	1
1828^	I	NR	President	John Quincy Adams	MA	1767	61	Sec. of Treasury	Richard Rush	PA	1780	48	43.6	31.8	2
1824^	O	DR	Sec. of State	John Quincy Adams (Note: In 1824, the Democratic-Republicans failed to agree on one candidate, and four Democratic-Republican candidates received electoral votes. No candidate won a majority of the electoral vote, so the House of Representatives conducted a contingent election under the terms of the 12th Amendment. The House chose between the three candidates with the most electoral votes, which were Jackson, Adams, and Crawford. Adams won the contingent election.)	MA	1767	57	Sec. of War	John C. Calhoun (Note: In 1824, several vice presidential candidates received electoral votes, but Calhoun won a majority of the electoral vote for vice president. Calhoun is italicized in the table because he appears twice for the same election.)	SC	1782	42	30.9	32.2	1
1824^	O	DR	Senator	Andrew Jackson	TN	1767	57	Sec. of War	John C. Calhoun	SC	1782	42	41.4	37.9	2
1824^	O	DR	Sec. of Treasury	William Crawford	GA	1772	52	Senator	Nathaniel Macon	NC	1757	66	11.2	15.7	3
1824^	O	DR	Speaker	Henry Clay	KY	1777	47	Chancellor	Nathan Sanford	NY	1777	47	13	14.2	4
1820^	I	DR	President	James Monroe (Note: Monroe was essentially unopposed in the election. A faithless elector, William Plumer, cast an electoral vote for Secretary of State John Quincy Adams, while unpledged Federalist electors and the independent candidacy of DeWitt Clinton won a small portion of the popular vote.)	VA	1758	62	Vice President	Daniel D. Tompkins	NY	1774	46	80.6	99.6	1
1816^	O	DR	Sec. of State	James Monroe	VA	1758	58	Governor	Daniel D. Tompkins	NY	1774	42	68.2	84.3	1
1816^	O	F	Senator	Rufus King	NY	1755	61	–	None (Note: King was not formally nominated and did not have a designated running mate. His electoral votes came from Federalist unpledged electors appointed by the state legislatures of Connecticut, Delaware, and Massachusetts.)	–	–	–	30.9	15.7	2
1812^	I	DR	President	James Madison	VA	1751	61	Fmr. Governor	Elbridge Gerry	MA	1744	68	50.4	59	1
1812^	C	DR/F	Mayor	DeWitt Clinton (Note: Clinton was supported by a mix of anti-Madison Democratic-Republicans and Federalists. Clinton himself remained in the Democratic-Republican Party. His running mate, Ingersoll, was a Federalist.)	NY	1769	43	State AG	Jared Ingersoll	PA	1749	63	47.6	41	2
1808^	O	DR	Sec. of State	James Madison	VA	1751	57	Vice President	George Clinton	NY	1739	69	64.7	69.3	1
1808^	O	F	Fmr. Ambassador	Charles C. Pinckney	SC	1746	62	Fmr. Ambassador	Rufus King	NY	1755	53	32.4	26.7	2
1804^	I	DR	President	Thomas Jefferson	VA	1743	61	Fmr. Governor	George Clinton	NY	1739	65	72.8	92	1
1804^	C	F	Fmr. Ambassador	Charles C. Pinckney	SC	1746	58	Fmr. Ambassador	Rufus King	NY	1755	49	27.2	8	2
1800*	C	DR	Vice President	Thomas Jefferson (Note: Jefferson tied his running mate, Burr, in electoral votes. As Jefferson and Burr tied, the House held a contingent election between Jefferson and Burr. Jefferson won the contingent election to become president, while Burr became vice president.)	VA	1743	57	Fmr. Senator	Aaron Burr	NY	1756	44	61.4	52.9	1
1800*	I	F	President	John Adams	MA	1735	65	Fmr. Ambassador	Charles C. Pinckney	SC	1746	54	38.6	47.1	2
1796*	O	F	Vice President	John Adams	MA	1735	61	Fmr. Ambassador	Thomas Pinckney (Note: Though Adams won election as president, Pinckney did not win election as vice president. Instead, Thomas Jefferson won election as vice president since he had the second most electoral votes. In addition to Pinckney and Adams, five other Federalists received electoral votes.)	SC	1750	46	53.4	51.4	1
1796*	O	DR	Fmr. Sec. of State	Thomas Jefferson	VA	1743	53	Senator	Aaron Burr	NY	1756	40	46.6	49.3	2
1792*	I	N	President	George Washington	VA	1732	60	Vice President	John Adams (Note: Though Washington was essentially unopposed, Adams faced competition for the second most electoral votes in both 1789 and 1792. In 1789, Adams's strongest competition came from John Jay of New York, while in 1792 Adams's strongest opposition came from George Clinton of New York.)	MA	1735	57	100	100	1
1789*	O	N	General	George Washington	VA	1732	56	Fmr. Ambassador	John Adams	MA	1735	53	100	100	1

== Other significant tickets ==
The following post-1800 tickets won less than 10% of the popular vote and less than 10% of the electoral vote, but won more than 1% of the popular vote or at least one electoral vote from an elector who had pledged to vote for the ticket. A caret (^) denotes elections held before 1832; before 1832, many states did not hold a popular vote for president.

		Presidential candidate					Vice presidential candidate					Results		
Year	P	Position	Name	S	B	A	Position	Name	S	B	A	PV%	EV%	R
2020	L	Academic	Jo Jorgensen	SC	1957	63	Businessman	Spike Cohen	SC	1982	38	1.2	0	3
2016	L	Fmr. Governor	Gary Johnson	NM	1953	63	Fmr. Governor	Bill Weld	MA	1945	71	3.3	0	3
2016	G	Physician	Jill Stein	MA	1950	66	Activist	Ajamu Baraka	IL	1953	63	1.1	0	4
2000	G	Attorney	Ralph Nader	CT	1934	66	Economist	Winona LaDuke	MN	1959	41	2.7	0	3
1996	Ref	Businessman	Ross Perot	TX	1930	66	Economist	Pat Choate	DC	1941	55	8.4	0	3
1980	I	Representative	John B. Anderson	IL	1922	58	Fmr. Ambassador	Patrick Lucey	WI	1918	62	6.6	0	3
1980	L	Attorney	Ed Clark	CA	1930	50	Businessman	David Koch	KS	1940	40	1.1	0	4
1972	AI	Representative	John G. Schmitz	CA	1930	42	Publisher	Thomas J. Anderson	TN	1910	61	1.4	0	3
1960	D	Senator	Harry F. Byrd (Note: Byrd and Thurmond did not seek national office in 1960, but received the votes of unpledged electors from Mississippi and Alabama.)	VA	1887	73	Senator	Strom Thurmond	SC	1902	57	0	2.8	3
1948	SR	Governor	Strom Thurmond	SC	1902	45	Governor	Fielding L. Wright	MS	1895	53	2.4	7.3	3
1948	P	Fmr. Vice President	Henry A. Wallace	IA	1888	60	Senator	Glen H. Taylor	ID	1904	44	2.4	0	4
1936	U	Representative	William Lemke	ND	1878	57	Attorney	Thomas C. O'Brien	MA	1887	48	1.9	0	3
1932	S	Minister	Norman Thomas	NY	1884	47	Fmr. state rep.	James H. Maurer	PA	1864	68	2.2	0	3
1920	S	Fmr. state rep.	Eugene V. Debs	IN	1855	65	Attorney	Seymour Stedman	IL	1871	49	3.4	0	3
1916	S	Editor	Allan L. Benson	NY	1871	45	Writer	George Kirkpatrick	NJ	1867	49	3.2	0	3
1916	Ph	Fmr. Governor	Frank Hanly	IN	1863	53	Minister	Ira Landrith	TN	1865	55	1.2	0	4
1912	S	Fmr. state rep.	Eugene V. Debs	IN	1855	57	Mayor	Emil Seidel	WI	1864	47	6	0	4
1912	Ph	Attorney	Eugene W. Chafin	AZ	1852	60	Minister	Aaron S. Watkins	KY	1863	49	1.4	0	5
1908	S	Fmr. state rep.	Eugene V. Debs	IN	1855	53	Tradesman	Ben Hanford	NY	1861	47	2.8	0	3
1908	Ph	Attorney	Eugene W. Chafin	IL	1852	56	Minister	Aaron S. Watkins	KY	1863	45	1.7	0	4
1904	S	Fmr. state rep.	Eugene V. Debs	IN	1855	48	Tradesman	Ben Hanford	NY	1861	43	3	0	3
1904	Ph	Minister	Silas C. Swallow	PA	1839	65	Businessman	George W. Carroll	TX	1855	49	1.9	0	4
1900	Ph	Attorney	John G. Woolley	IL	1850	50	Fmr. state senator	Henry B. Metcalf	RI	1829	71	1.5	0	3
1892	Po	Fmr. Representative	James B. Weaver	IA	1833	59	Fmr. state AG	James G. Field	VA	1826	66	8.5	5	3
1892	Ph	Fmr. Representative	John Bidwell	CA	1819	73	Minister	James B. Cranfill (Note: Cranfill was allowed to appear on state ballots despite the fact that he was constitutionally ineligible to be vice president due to his age.)	TX	1858	34	2.2	0	4
1888	Ph	Businessman	Clinton B. Fisk	NY	1828	59	Scholar	John A. Brooks	MO	1836	51	2.2	0	3
1888	LU	State senator	Alson Streeter	IL	1823	65	Attorney	Charles Cunningham	AR	1823	65	1.3	0	4
1884	GB	Fmr. Governor	Benjamin Butler	MA	1818	65	State senator	Absolom M. West	MS	1817	67	1.7	0	3
1884	Ph	Fmr. Governor	John St. John	KS	1833	51	Attorney	William Daniel	MD	1826	58	1.5	0	4
1880	GB	Representative	James B. Weaver	IA	1833	47	Businessman	Barzillai Chambers	TX	1817	62	3.4	0	3
1852	FS	Senator	John P. Hale	NH	1806	46	Fmr. Representative	George W. Julian	IN	1817	35	4.9	0	3
1844	Li	Attorney	James G. Birney	MI	1792	52	Fmr. Senator	Thomas Morris	OH	1776	68	2.3	0	3
1836	W	Senator	Hugh Lawson White	TN	1773	63	Fmr. Senator	John Tyler	VA	1790	46	9.7	8.8	3
1836	W	Senator	Daniel Webster	MA	1782	54	Senator	Francis Granger	NY	1792	44	2.7	4.8	4
1836	W	Senator	Willie P. Mangum	NC	1792	44	Fmr. Senator	John Tyler	VA	1790	46	0	3.7	5
1832	N	Governor	John Floyd (Note: Floyd did not actively campaign in the 1832 presidential election. He won the votes of South Carolina, where the legislature appointed electors.)	VA	1783	49	Economist	Henry Lee	MA	1782	50	0	3.8	3
1832	AM	Fmr. Attorney General	William Wirt	VA	1772	60	Fmr. state AG	Amos Ellmaker	PA	1787	45	7.8	2.4	4
1820^	DR	Governor	DeWitt Clinton (Note: Clinton did not actively seek office in 1820.)	NY	1769	51	-	None	-	-	-	1.75	0	3
1812^	F	Fmr. Ambassador	Rufus King (Note: Most Federalists supported DeWitt Clinton in 1812, but King received some votes as a "straight Federalist.")	NY	1755	57	Fmr. Governor	William R. Davie	NC	1756	56	2	0	3
1808^	DR	Vice President	George Clinton (Note: The New York legislature split its presidential electoral votes between James Madison and George Clinton, and its vice presidential electoral votes between Monroe and Madison.)	NY	1739	69	Fmr. Ambassador	James Monroe	VA	1758	50	0	3.4	3
1808^	DR	Fmr. Ambassador	James Monroe (Note: A group known as the tertium quids supported Monroe, but Monroe did not actively contest the election.)	VA	1758	50	-	None	-	-	-	2.5	0	4

== See also ==
- List of third party and independent performances in United States elections
- List of people who received an electoral vote in the United States Electoral College
- Party divisions of United States Congresses

== Sources and works cited ==
- Deskins, Donald Richard; Walton, Hanes; Puckett, Sherman (2010). Presidential Elections, 1789–2008: County, State, and National Mapping of Election Data. University of Michigan Press. ISBN 978-0472116973.
- Gienapp, William E. (1987). The Origins of the Republican Party, 1852-1856. Oxford University Press.
- Southwick, Leslie (1998). Presidential Also-Rans and Running Mates, 1788 through 1996 (Second ed.). McFarland. ISBN 0-7864-0310-1. Source for year of birth, age, and home state.
- "United States Presidential Election Results". Dave Leip's Atlas of Elections. Dave Leip. Source for popular and electoral vote.
- "U.S. Electoral College". National Archives and Records Administration. Source for popular and electoral vote.
