= List of United States presidential candidates by number of votes received =

Following is a list of United States presidential candidates by number of votes received. Elections have tended to have more participation in each successive election, due to the increasing population of the United States, and, in some instances, expansion of the right to vote to larger segments of society. Prior to the election of 1824, most states did not have a popular vote. In the election of 1824, only 18 of the 24 states held a popular vote, but by the election of 1828, 22 of the 24 states held a popular vote. Minor candidates are excluded if they received fewer than 100,000 votes or less than 0.1% of the vote in their election year.

== List of candidates ==
=== Popular votes in individual elections ===
List of presidential candidates by votes in individual elections
| Candidate | Year | Party | Popular vote | Percentage | Notes |
|---|---|---|---|---|---|
| Joe Biden | 2020 | Democratic | 81,283,501 | 51.31% | Winner |
| Donald Trump | 2024 | Republican | 77,302,580 | 49.80% | Winner (former president). |
| Kamala Harris | 2024 | Democratic | 75,017,613 | 48.32% | Runner-up. |
| Donald Trump | 2020 | Republican | 74,223,975 | 46.85% | Runner-up (incumbent). |
| Barack Obama | 2008 | Democratic | 69,498,516 | 52.93% | Winner. |
| Barack Obama | 2012 | Democratic | 65,915,795 | 51.06% | Winner (incumbent). |
| Hillary Clinton | 2016 | Democratic | 65,853,514 | 48.18% | Runner-up. Won the popular vote, but lost the Electoral College. |
| Donald Trump | 2016 | Republican | 62,984,828 | 46.09% | Winner. Lost the popular vote, but won the Electoral College. |
| George W. Bush | 2004 | Republican | 62,040,610 | 50.73% | Winner (incumbent). |
| Mitt Romney | 2012 | Republican | 60,933,504 | 47.20% | Runner-up. |
| John McCain | 2008 | Republican | 59,948,323 | 45.65% | Runner-up. |
| John Kerry | 2004 | Democratic | 59,028,444 | 48.27% | Runner-up. |
| Ronald Reagan | 1984 | Republican | 54,455,472 | 58.77% | Winner (incumbent). |
| Al Gore | 2000 | Democratic | 50,999,897 | 48.38% | Runner-up. Won the popular vote, but lost the Electoral College. |
| George W. Bush | 2000 | Republican | 50,456,002 | 47.86% | Winner. Lost the popular vote, but won the Electoral College. |
| George H. W. Bush | 1988 | Republican | 48,886,597 | 53.37% | Winner. |
| Bill Clinton | 1996 | Democratic | 47,401,185 | 49.24% | Winner (incumbent). |
| Richard Nixon | 1972 | Republican | 47,168,710 | 60.67% | Winner (incumbent). |
| Bill Clinton | 1992 | Democratic | 44,909,889 | 43.01% | Winner. |
| Ronald Reagan | 1980 | Republican | 43,903,230 | 50.75% | Winner. |
| Lyndon B. Johnson | 1964 | Democratic | 43,127,041 | 61.05% | Winner (incumbent). |
| Michael Dukakis | 1988 | Democratic | 41,809,476 | 45.65% | Runner-up. |
| Jimmy Carter | 1976 | Democratic | 40,831,881 | 50.08% | Winner. |
| Bob Dole | 1996 | Republican | 39,197,469 | 40.71% | Runner-up. |
| Gerald Ford | 1976 | Republican | 39,148,634 | 48.02% | Runner-up (incumbent). |
| George H. W. Bush | 1992 | Republican | 39,104,550 | 37.45% | Runner-up (incumbent). |
| Walter Mondale | 1984 | Democratic | 37,577,352 | 40.56% | Runner-up. |
| Dwight D. Eisenhower | 1956 | Republican | 35,579,180 | 57.37% | Winner (incumbent). |
| Jimmy Carter | 1980 | Democratic | 35,480,115 | 41.01% | Runner-up (incumbent). |
| John F. Kennedy | 1960 | Democratic | 34,220,984 | 49.72% | Winner. |
| Richard Nixon | 1960 | Republican | 34,108,157 | 49.55% | Runner-up. |
| Dwight D. Eisenhower | 1952 | Republican | 34,075,529 | 55.18% | Winner. |
| Richard Nixon | 1968 | Republican | 31,783,783 | 43.42% | Winner. |
| Hubert Humphrey | 1968 | Democratic | 31,271,839 | 42.72% | Runner-up. |
| George McGovern | 1972 | Democratic | 29,173,222 | 37.52% | Runner-up. |
| Franklin D. Roosevelt | 1936 | Democratic | 27,752,648 | 60.80% | Winner (incumbent). |
| Adlai Stevenson II | 1952 | Democratic | 27,375,090 | 44.33% | Runner-up. |
| Franklin D. Roosevelt | 1940 | Democratic | 27,313,945 | 54.74% | Winner (incumbent). |
| Barry Goldwater | 1964 | Republican | 27,175,754 | 38.47% | Runner-up. |
| Adlai Stevenson II | 1956 | Democratic | 26,028,028 | 41.97% | Runner-up. |
| Franklin D. Roosevelt | 1944 | Democratic | 25,612,916 | 53.39% | Winner (incumbent). |
| Harry S. Truman | 1948 | Democratic | 24,179,347 | 49.55% | Winner (incumbent). |
| Franklin D. Roosevelt | 1932 | Democratic | 22,821,277 | 57.41% | Winner. |
| Wendell Willkie | 1940 | Republican | 22,347,744 | 44.78% | Runner-up. |
| Thomas E. Dewey | 1944 | Republican | 22,017,929 | 45.89% | Runner-up. |
| Thomas E. Dewey | 1948 | Republican | 21,991,292 | 45.07% | Runner-up. |
| Herbert Hoover | 1928 | Republican | 21,427,123 | 58.11% | Winner. |
| Ross Perot | 1992 | Independent | 19,743,821 | 18.91% | Highest vote total of any third-party or independent candidate and highest vote total of anyone to not win electoral votes. |
| Alf Landon | 1936 | Republican | 16,679,543 | 36.54% | Runner-up. |
| Warren G. Harding | 1920 | Republican | 16,144,093 | 60.35% | Winner. |
| Herbert Hoover | 1932 | Republican | 15,761,254 | 39.6% | Runner-up (incumbent). |
| Calvin Coolidge | 1924 | Republican | 15,723,789 | 54.0% | Winner (incumbent). |
| Al Smith | 1928 | Democratic | 15,015,464 | 40.90% | Runner-up. |
| George Wallace | 1968 | American Independent | 9,901,118 | 13.5% | Third-party candidate. Last third-party candidate to receive pledged electoral college votes from any state. |
| James M. Cox | 1920 | Democratic | 9,139,661 | 34.12% | Runner-up. |
| Woodrow Wilson | 1916 | Democratic | 9,126,868 | 49.24% | Winner (incumbent). |
| Charles Evans Hughes | 1916 | Republican | 8,548,728 | 46.12% | Runner-up. |
| John W. Davis | 1924 | Democratic | 8,386,242 | 28.8% | Runner-up. |
| Ross Perot | 1996 | Reform | 8,085,294 | 8.40% | Third-party candidate. |
| William Howard Taft | 1908 | Republican | 7,678,335 | 51.57% | Winner. |
| Theodore Roosevelt | 1904 | Republican | 7,630,557 | 56.42% | Winner (incumbent). |
| William McKinley | 1900 | Republican | 7,228,864 | 51.64% | Winner (incumbent). |
| William McKinley | 1896 | Republican | 7,112,138 | 51.03% | Winner. |
| William Jennings Bryan | 1896 | Democratic | 6,509,052 | 46.70% | Runner-up. Also endorsed by the Populist Party and the Silver Party. |
| William Jennings Bryan | 1908 | Democratic | 6,408,979 | 43.04% | Runner-up. |
| William Jennings Bryan | 1900 | Democratic | 6,370,932 | 45.5% | Runner-up. |
| Woodrow Wilson | 1912 | Democratic | 6,296,284 | 41.84% | Winner. |
| John B. Anderson | 1980 | Independent | 5,719,850 | 6.61% | Independent candidate. |
| Grover Cleveland | 1892 | Democratic | 5,553,898 | 46.02% | Winner (former president). |
| Grover Cleveland | 1888 | Democratic | 5,534,488 | 48.6% | Runner-up (incumbent). Won the popular vote, but lost the Electoral College. |
| Benjamin Harrison | 1888 | Republican | 5,443,633 | 47.8% | Winner. Lost the popular vote, but won the Electoral College. |
| Benjamin Harrison | 1892 | Republican | 5,176,108 | 43.0% | Runner-up (incumbent). |
| Alton B. Parker | 1904 | Democratic | 5,083,880 | 37.59% | Runner-up. |
| Grover Cleveland | 1884 | Democratic | 4,914,482 | 48.8% | Winner. |
| James G. Blaine | 1884 | Republican | 4,856,905 | 48.3% | Runner-up. |
| Robert M. La Follette | 1924 | Progressive | 4,831,706 | 16.6% | Third-party candidate. Also endorsed by the Socialist Party and the Farmer–Labor Party. |
| Gary Johnson | 2016 | Libertarian | 4,489,235 | 3.28% | Third-party candidate. |
| James A. Garfield | 1880 | Republican | 4,453,337 | 48.32% | Winner. |
| Winfield Scott Hancock | 1880 | Democratic | 4,444,976 | 48.21% | Runner-up. |
| Samuel J. Tilden | 1876 | Democratic | 4,288,546 | 50.9% | Runner-up. Won the popular vote, but lost the Electoral College. |
| Theodore Roosevelt | 1912 | Progressive | 4,122,721 | 27.40% | Runner-up (former president). |
| Rutherford B. Hayes | 1876 | Republican | 4,034,142 | 47.9% | Winner. Lost the popular vote, but won the Electoral College. |
| Ulysses S. Grant | 1872 | Republican | 3,597,439 | 55.6% | Winner (incumbent). |
| William Howard Taft | 1912 | Republican | 3,486,242 | 23.17% | Third place (incumbent). Only post-Civil War election in which a candidate from one of the two major parties came in third place. |
| Ulysses S. Grant | 1868 | Republican | 3,013,790 | 52.7% | Winner. |
| Ralph Nader | 2000 | Green | 2,882,955 | 2.74% | Third-party candidate. |
| Horace Greeley | 1872 | Liberal Republican | 2,834,761 | 43.8% | Runner-up. Also endorsed by the Democratic Party. |
| Horatio Seymour | 1868 | Democratic | 2,708,744 | 47.3% | Runner-up. |
| Abraham Lincoln | 1864 | National Union | 2,211,317 | 55.1% | Winner (incumbent). Lincoln was the only member of the National Union party elected president. |
| Jo Jorgensen | 2020 | Libertarian | 1,865,724 | 1.18% | Third-party candidate. |
| Abraham Lincoln | 1860 | Republican | 1,855,993 | 39.7% | Winner. Lincoln was the first member of the Republican party elected president. (Note: The election of 1860 was a complex realigning election in which the breakdown of the previous two-party alignment culminated in four parties each competing for influence in different parts of the country. The result of the election, with the victory of an ardent opponent of slavery, spurred the secession of eleven states and brought about the American Civil War.) |
| James Buchanan | 1856 | Democratic | 1,835,140 | 45.3% | Winner. |
| George B. McClellan | 1864 | Democratic | 1,812,807 | 44.9% | Runner-up. |
| Franklin Pierce | 1852 | Democratic | 1,605,943 | 50.84% | Winner. |
| Jill Stein | 2016 | Green | 1,457,226 | 1.07% | Third-party candidate. |
| Winfield Scott | 1852 | Whig | 1,386,942 | 43.87% | Runner-up. |
| Stephen A. Douglas | 1860 | Northern Democratic | 1,380,202 | 21.5% | Runner-up. |
| Zachary Taylor | 1848 | Whig | 1,360,235 | 47.3% | Winner. Taylor was the last member of the Whig party elected president. |
| John C. Frémont | 1856 | Republican | 1,342,345 | 33.1% | Runner-up. |
| James K. Polk | 1844 | Democratic | 1,339,570 | 49.4% | Winner. |
| Henry Clay | 1844 | Whig | 1,300,004 | 48.2% | Runner-up. |
| Gary Johnson | 2012 | Libertarian | 1,275,971 | 0.99% | Third-party candidate. |
| William Henry Harrison | 1840 | Whig | 1,275,583 | 52.87% | Winner. Harrison was the first member of the Whig party elected president. |
| Lewis Cass | 1848 | Democratic | 1,223,460 | 42.5% | Runner-up. |
| Strom Thurmond | 1948 | Dixiecrat | 1,175,930 | 2.41% | Third-party candidate. |
| Henry A. Wallace | 1948 | Progressive | 1,157,328 | 2.37% | Third-party candidate. |
| Martin Van Buren | 1840 | Democratic | 1,128,854 | 46.82% | Runner-up (incumbent). |
| John G. Schmitz | 1972 | American Independent | 1,100,868 | 1.42% | Independent candidate. |
| James B. Weaver | 1892 | Populist | 1,041,028 | 8.6% | Third-party candidate. |
| Ed Clark | 1980 | Libertarian | 921,128 | 1.06% | Third-party candidate. |
| Eugene V. Debs | 1920 | Socialist | 913,693 | 3.41% | Third-party candidate. |
| Eugene V. Debs | 1912 | Socialist | 901,551 | 5.99% | Third-party candidate. |
| William Lemke | 1936 | Union | 892,378 | 1.95% | Third-party candidate. |
| Norman Thomas | 1932 | Socialist | 884,885 | 2.23% | Third-party candidate. |
| Millard Fillmore | 1856 | American | 873,053 | 21.5% | Third-party candidate. Also endorsed by the Whig Party. |
| Jill Stein | 2024 | Green | 862,049 (Note: This is not the final result; a very small percentage of votes are still being counted.) | 0.56% | Third-party candidate. |
| John C. Breckinridge | 1860 | Southern Democratic | 848,019 | 14.4% | Party split. |
| Martin Van Buren | 1836 | Democratic | 763,291 | 50.8% | Winner. |
| Robert F. Kennedy Jr. | 2024 | Independent | 756,393 | 0.49% | Independent candidate. |
| Eugene McCarthy | 1976 | Independent | 740,460 | 0.91% | Independent candidate. |
| Ralph Nader | 2008 | Independent | 739,034 | 0.56% | Independent candidate. |
| Evan McMullin | 2016 | Independent | 732,273 | 0.54% | Independent candidate. |
| Andrew Jackson | 1832 | Democratic | 702,735 | 54.2% | Winner (incumbent). |
| Ralph Nader | 1996 | Green | 685,297 | 0.71% | Third-party candidate. |
| Chase Oliver | 2024 | Libertarian | 650,126 | 0.42% | Third-party candidate. |
| Andrew Jackson | 1828 | Democratic | 642,806 | 55.33% | Winner. Jackson was the first member of the Democratic party elected president. |
| John Bell | 1860 | Constitutional Union | 590,901 | 12.6% | Party split. |
| Allan L. Benson | 1916 | Socialist | 590,524 | 3.19% | Third-party candidate. |
| William Henry Harrison | 1836 | Whig | 550,816 | 36.6% | Runner-up. |
| Bob Barr | 2008 | Libertarian | 523,715 | 0.40% | Third-party candidate. |
| John Quincy Adams | 1828 | National Republican | 500,897 | 43.98% | Runner-up (incumbent). |
| Harry Browne | 1996 | Libertarian | 485,759 | 0.50% | Third-party candidate. |
| Henry Clay | 1832 | National Republican | 484,205 | 37.4% | Runner-up. |
| Jill Stein | 2012 | Green | 469,627 | 0.36% | Third-party candidate. |
| Ralph Nader | 2004 | Independent | 465,151 | 0.38% | Independent candidate. Also endorsed by the Reform Party. |
| Pat Buchanan | 2000 | Reform | 448,895 | 0.43% | Third-party candidate. |
| Ron Paul | 1988 | Libertarian | 431,750 | 0.47% | Third-party candidate. |
| Eugene V. Debs | 1908 | Socialist | 420,852 | 2.83% | Third-party candidate. |
| Howie Hawkins | 2020 | Green | 405,035 | 0.26% | Third-party candidate. |
| Eugene V. Debs | 1904 | Socialist | 402,810 | 2.98% | Third-party candidate. |
| Michael Badnarik | 2004 | Libertarian | 397,265 | 0.32% | Third-party candidate. |
| Harry Browne | 2000 | Libertarian | 384,431 | 0.36% | Third-party candidate. |
| James B. Weaver | 1880 | Greenback | 308,649 | 3.35% | Third-party candidate. |
| Martin Van Buren | 1848 | Free Soil | 291,501 | 10.1% | Third-party candidate (former president). |
| Andre Marrou | 1992 | Libertarian | 290,087 | 0.28% | Third-party candidate. |
| John Bidwell | 1892 | Prohibition | 270,879 | 2.24% | Third-party candidate. |
| Norman Thomas | 1928 | Socialist | 267,478 | 0.73% | Third-party candidate. |
| Parley P. Christensen | 1920 | Farmer–Labor | 265,398 | 0.99% | Third-party candidate. |
| Silas C. Swallow | 1904 | Prohibition | 259,102 | 1.92% | Third-party candidate. |
| Eugene W. Chafin | 1908 | Prohibition | 254,087 | 1.71% | Third-party candidate. |
| Clinton B. Fisk | 1888 | Prohibition | 249,819 | 2.20% | Third-party candidate. |
| Barry Commoner | 1980 | Citizens | 233,052 | 0.27% | Third-party candidate. |
| David Bergland | 1984 | Libertarian | 228,111 | 0.25% | Third-party candidate. |
| Frank Hanly | 1916 | Prohibition | 221,302 | 1.19% | Third-party candidate. |
| Lenora Fulani | 1988 | New Alliance | 217,221 | 0.24% | Third-party candidate. |
| John G. Woolley | 1900 | Prohibition | 210,864 | 1.51% | Third-party candidate. |
| Eugene W. Chafin | 1912 | Prohibition | 208,156 | 1.38% | Third-party candidate. |
| Darrell Castle | 2016 | Constitution | 203,091 | 0.15% | Third-party candidate. |
| Chuck Baldwin | 2008 | Constitution | 199,750 | 0.15% | Third-party candidate. |
| Aaron S. Watkins | 1920 | Prohibition | 188,787 | 0.70% | Third-party candidate. |
| Norman Thomas | 1936 | Socialist | 187,910 | 0.41% | Third-party candidate. |
| Howard Phillips | 1996 | Taxpayers | 184,656 | 0.19% | Third-party candidate. |
| Roger MacBride | 1976 | Libertarian | 172,557 | 0.21% | Third-party candidate. |
| Lester Maddox | 1976 | American Independent | 170,274 | 0.21% | Third-party candidate. |
| Claudia De la Cruz | 2024 | Socialism and Liberation | 166,175 | 0.10% | Third-party candidate. |
| Cynthia McKinney | 2008 | Green | 161,797 | 0.12% | Third-party candidate. |
| Thomas J. Anderson | 1976 | American | 158,271 | 0.19% | Third-party candidate. |
| John P. Hale | 1852 | Free Soil | 155,210 | 4.91% | Third-party candidate. |
| Andrew Jackson | 1824 | Democratic-Republican | 151,271 | 40.5% | Runner-up. Won the popular vote and received the most electoral votes, but lost the electoral college majority and contingent election. (Note: No candidate won the Electoral College; the election was decided by Congress, which chose John Quincy Adams.) |
| John St. John | 1884 | Prohibition | 147,482 | 1.50% | Third-party candidate. |
| Alson Streeter | 1888 | Union Labor | 146,602 | 1.31% | Third-party candidate. |
| Hugh Lawson White | 1836 | Whig | 146,109 | 9.7% | The Whig Party fielded two different presidential tickets in different parts of the country. |
| Michael Peroutka | 2004 | Constitution | 143,630 | 0.12% | Third-party candidate. |
| Vincent Hallinan | 1952 | Progressive | 140,746 | 0.23% | Third-party candidate. |
| James Madison | 1812 | Democratic-Republican | 140,431 | 52.3% | Winner (incumbent). A limited number of states counted the popular vote. |
| Norman Thomas | 1948 | Socialist | 139,569 | 0.29% | Third-party candidate. |
| John M. Palmer | 1896 | National Democratic | 134,645 | 0.97% | Third-party candidate. |
| Benjamin Butler | 1884 | Anti-Monopoly | 134,294 | 1.33% | Third-party candidate. Also endorsed by the Greenback Party. |
| DeWitt Clinton | 1812 | Democratic-Republican | 132,781 | 45.4% | Runner-up. Also endorsed by much of the Federalist Party. A limited number of states counted the popular vote. |
| Joshua Levering | 1896 | Prohibition | 131,312 | 0.94% | Third-party candidate. |
| James Madison | 1808 | Democratic-Republican | 124,732 | 65.0% | Winner. A limited number of states counted the popular vote. |
| David Cobb | 2004 | Green | 119,859 | 0.10% | Third-party candidate. |
| Norman Thomas | 1940 | Socialist | 116,599 | 0.23% | Third-party candidate. |
| Thomas E. Watson | 1904 | Populist | 114,070 | 0.84% | Third-party candidate. |
| John Hagelin | 1996 | Natural Law | 113,670 | 0.12% | Third-party candidate. |
| John Quincy Adams | 1824 | Democratic-Republican | 113,142 | 32.7% | Winner. Lost the popular vote and electoral college, but won the contingent election. Adams was the last member of the Democratic-Republican party elected president and the only member of the National Republican party elected president. |
| T. Coleman Andrews | 1956 | States' Rights | 108,956 | 0.18% | Third-party candidate. |
| Bo Gritz | 1992 | Populist | 106,152 | 0.10% | Third-party candidate. |
| Thomas Jefferson | 1804 | Democratic-Republican | 104,110 | 73.2% | Winner (incumbent). A limited number of states counted the popular vote. |
| Claude A. Watson | 1948 | Prohibition | 103,708 | 0.21% | Third-party candidate. |
| William Z. Foster | 1932 | Communist | 103,307 | 0.26% | Third-party candidate. |
| William Wirt | 1832 | Anti-Masonic | 100,715 | 7.8% | Third-party candidate. |

=== Lifetime popular votes ===
The following list indicates lifetime popular votes received across multiple elections in which the candidate was the nominee of a political party or was otherwise on a presidential ballot. It does include write-in votes that may have been received by candidates in elections in which they were not candidates. W means they were the winner, while L means they were the runner-up.

| Candidate | Party | Popular votes | Elections |
|---|---|---|---|
| Donald Trump | Republican | 214,511,383 | 2016 W, 2020 L, 2024 W |
| Barack Obama | Democratic | 135,414,311 | 2008 W, 2012 W |
| Richard Nixon | Republican | 113,060,650 | 1960 L, 1968 W, 1972 W |
| George W. Bush | Republican | 112,496,612 | 2000 W, 2004 W |
| Franklin D. Roosevelt | Democratic | 103,500,786 | 1932 W, 1936 W, 1940 W, 1944 W |
| Ronald Reagan | Republican | 98,358,702 | 1980 W, 1984 W |
| Bill Clinton | Democratic | 92,311,074 | 1992 W, 1996 W |
| George H. W. Bush | Republican | 87,991,147 | 1988 W, 1992 L |
| Joe Biden | Democratic | 81,283,485 | 2020 W |
| Jimmy Carter | Democratic | 76,311,996 | 1976 W, 1980 L |
| Kamala Harris | Democratic | 75,017,613 | 2024 L |
| Dwight D. Eisenhower | Republican | 69,654,709 | 1952 W, 1956 W |
| Hillary Clinton | Democratic | 65,853,514 | 2016 L |
| Mitt Romney | Republican | 60,933,504 | 2012 L |
| John McCain | Republican | 59,948,323 | 2008 L |
| John Kerry | Democratic | 59,028,444 | 2004 L |
| Adlai Stevenson II | Democratic | 53,403,118 | 1952 L, 1956 L |
| Al Gore | Democratic | 50,999,897 | 2000 L |
| Thomas E. Dewey | Republican | 44,009,221 | 1944 L, 1948 L |
| Lyndon B. Johnson | Democratic | 43,127,041 | 1964 W |
| Michael Dukakis | Democratic | 41,809,074 | 1988 L |
| Bob Dole | Republican | 39,197,469 | 1996 L |
| Gerald Ford | Republican | 39,148,634 | 1976 L |
| Walter Mondale | Democratic | 37,577,352 | 1984 L |
| Herbert Hoover | Republican | 37,188,377 | 1928 W, 1932 L |
| John F. Kennedy | Democratic | 34,220,984 | 1960 W |
| Hubert Humphrey | Democratic | 31,271,839 | 1968 L |
| George McGovern | Democratic | 29,173,222 | 1972 L |
| Ross Perot | Independent | 27,829,115 | 1992 L, 1996 L |
| Barry Goldwater | Republican | 27,175,754 | 1964 L |
| Harry S. Truman | Democratic | 24,179,347 | 1948 W |
| Wendell Willkie | Republican | 22,347,744 | 1940 L |
| William Jennings Bryan | Democratic | 19,288,963 | 1896 L, 1900 L, 1908 L |
| Alf Landon | Republican | 16,679,543 | 1936 L |
| Warren G. Harding | Republican | 16,144,093 | 1920 W |
| Grover Cleveland | Democratic | 16,002,868 | 1884 W, 1888 L, 1892 W |
| Calvin Coolidge | Republican | 15,723,789 | 1924 W |
| Woodrow Wilson | Democratic | 15,423,152 | 1912 W, 1916 W |
| Al Smith | Democratic | 15,015,464 | 1928 L |
| William McKinley | Republican | 14,341,002 | 1896 W, 1900 W |
| Theodore Roosevelt | Republican | 11,753,278 | 1904 W, 1912 L |
| William Howard Taft | Republican | 11,164,577 | 1908 W, 1912 L |
| Benjamin Harrison | Republican | 10,619,741 | 1888 W, 1892 L |
| George Wallace | American Independent | 9,901,118 | 1968 L |
| James M. Cox | Democratic | 9,139,661 | 1920 L |
| Charles Evans Hughes | Republican | 8,548,728 | 1916 L |
| John W. Davis | Democratic | 8,386,242 | 1924 L |
| Ulysses S. Grant | Republican | 6,611,229 | 1868 W, 1872 W |
| Gary Johnson | Libertarian | 5,765,206 | 2012 L, 2016 L |
| John B. Anderson | Independent | 5,719,850 | 1980 L |
| Alton B. Parker | Democratic | 5,083,880 | 1904 L |
| James G. Blaine | Republican | 4,856,905 | 1884 L |
| Robert M. La Follette | Progressive | 4,831,706 | 1924 L |
| Ralph Nader | Green | 4,772,437 | 1996 L, 2000 L, 2004 L, 2008 L |
| James A. Garfield | Republican | 4,453,337 | 1880 W |
| Winfield Scott Hancock | Democratic | 4,444,976 | 1880 L |
| Samuel J. Tilden | Democratic | 4,288,546 | 1876 L |
| Abraham Lincoln | Republican | 4,067,310 | 1860 W, 1864 W |
| Rutherford B. Hayes | Republican | 4,034,142 | 1876 W |
| Horace Greeley | Liberal Republican | 2,834,761 | 1872 L |
| Jill Stein | Green | 2,788,902 | 2012 L, 2016 L, 2024 L |
| Eugene V. Debs | Socialist | 2,726,851 | 1900 L, 1904 L, 1908 L, 1912 L, 1920 L |
| Horatio Seymour | Democratic | 2,700,974 | 1868 L |
| Martin Van Buren | Democratic | 2,183,646 | 1836 W, 1840 L, 1848 L |
| Jo Jorgensen | Libertarian | 1,865,720 | 2020 L |
| James Buchanan | Democratic | 1,835,140 | 1856 W |
| Henry Clay | Whig | 1,831,740 | 1824 L, 1832 L, 1844 L |
| William Henry Harrison | Whig | 1,826,399 | 1836 L, 1840 W |
| George B. McClellan | Democratic | 1,812,807 | 1864 L |
| Norman Thomas | Socialist | 1,675,458 | 1928 L, 1932 L, 1936 L, 1940 L, 1944 L, 1948 L |
| Franklin Pierce | Democratic | 1,605,943 | 1852 W |
| Andrew Jackson | Democratic | 1,496,812 | 1824 L, 1828 W, 1832 W |
| Winfield Scott | Whig | 1,386,942 | 1852 L |
| Stephen A. Douglas | Northern Democratic | 1,380,202 | 1860 L |
| Zachary Taylor | Whig | 1,360,235 | 1848 W |
| James B. Weaver | Populist | 1,349,677 | 1880 L, 1892 L |
| John C. Frémont | Republican | 1,342,345 | 1856 L |
| James K. Polk | Democratic | 1,339,570 | 1844 W |
| Lewis Cass | Democratic | 1,223,460 | 1848 L |
| Strom Thurmond | Dixiecrat | 1,175,930 | 1948 L |
| Henry A. Wallace | Progressive | 1,157,328 | 1948 L |
| John G. Schmitz | American Independent | 1,100,868 | 1972 L |
| Ed Clark | Libertarian | 921,128 | 1980 L |
| William Lemke | Union | 892,378 | 1936 L |
| Millard Fillmore | American | 873,053 | 1856 L |
| Harry Browne | Libertarian | 870,190 | 1996 L, 2000 L |
| John C. Breckinridge | Southern Democratic | 848,019 | 1860 L |
| Eugene McCarthy | Independent | 796,999 | 1968 L, 1976 L, 1988 L |
| Robert F. Kennedy Jr. | Independent | 756,393 | 2024 L |
| Evan McMullin | Independent | 732,273 | 2016 L |
| Chase Oliver | Libertarian | 650,126 | 2024 L |
| John Quincy Adams | National Republican | 614,039 | 1824 W, 1828 L |
| John Bell | Constitutional Union | 590,901 | 1860 L |
| Allan L. Benson | Socialist | 590,524 | 1916 L |
| Bob Barr | Libertarian | 523,715 | 2008 L |
| Ron Paul | Libertarian | 500,380 | 1988 L, 2008 L, 2012 L |
| Eugene W. Chafin | Prohibition | 462,243 | 1908 L, 1912 L |
| Pat Buchanan | Reform | 448,895 | 2000 L |
| Howie Hawkins | Green | 405,035 | 2020 L |
| Michael Badnarik | Libertarian | 397,265 | 2004 L |
| Howard Phillips | Taxpayers | 326,045 | 1992 L, 1996 L, 2000 L |
| Lenora Fulani | New Alliance | 290,843 | 1988 L, 1992 L |
| Andre Marrou | Libertarian | 290,087 | 1992 L |
| John Bidwell | Prohibition | 270,879 | 1892 L |
| Parley P. Christensen | Farmer–Labor | 265,398 | 1920 L |
| James Madison | Democratic-Republican | 265,163 | 1808 W, 1812 W |
| Silas C. Swallow | Prohibition | 259,102 | 1904 L |
| Clinton B. Fisk | Prohibition | 249,819 | 1888 L |
| John Hagelin | Natural Law | 234,509 | 1992 L, 1996 L, 2000 L |
| Barry Commoner | Citizens | 233,052 | 1980 L |
| David Bergland | Libertarian | 228,111 | 1984 L |
| Frank Hanly | Prohibition | 221,302 | 1916 L |
| John G. Woolley | Prohibition | 210,864 | 1900 L |
| Darrell Castle | Constitution | 203,091 | 2016 L |
| Chuck Baldwin | Constitution | 199,750 | 2008 L |
| William Z. Foster | Communist | 190,527 | 1924 L, 1928 L, 1932 L |
| Aaron S. Watkins | Prohibition | 188,787 | 1920 L |
| Claude A. Watson | Prohibition | 178,466 | 1944 L, 1948 L |
| Thomas Jefferson | Democratic-Republican | 176,555 | 1796 L, 1800 W, 1804 W |
| Roger MacBride | Libertarian | 172,557 | 1976 L |
| Lester Maddox | American Independent | 170,373 | 1976 L |
| Claudia De la Cruz | PSL | 166,175 | 2024 L |
| Cynthia McKinney | Green | 161,797 | 2008 L |
| Thomas J. Anderson | American | 158,724 | 1976 L |
| John P. Hale | Free Soil | 155,210 | 1852 L |
| John St. John | Prohibition | 147,482 | 1884 L |
| Alson Streeter | Union Labor | 146,602 | 1888 L |
| Hugh Lawson White | Whig | 146,109 | 1836 L |
| Michael Peroutka | Constitution | 143,630 | 2004 L |
| Thomas E. Watson | Populist | 142,932 | 1904 L, 1908 L |
| Vincent Hallinan | Progressive | 140,746 | 1952 L |
| DeWitt Clinton | Democratic-Republican | 134,674 | 1812 L, 1820 L |
| John M. Palmer | National Democratic | 134,645 | 1896 L |
| Benjamin Butler | Democratic | 134,294 | 1884 L |
| Joshua Levering | Prohibition | 131,312 | 1896 L |
| David Cobb | Green | 119,859 | 2004 L |
| Bernie Sanders | Independent | 111,609 | 2016 L |
| T. Coleman Andrews | States' Rights | 108,956 | 1956 L |
| Bo Gritz | Populist | 106,152 | 1992 L |
| William Wirt | Anti-Masonic | 100,715 | 1832 L |

=== Lifetime electoral votes ===
The following list indicates lifetime electoral votes received across multiple elections in which the candidate was the nominee of a political party or was otherwise on a presidential ballot. Note that the counting for Electoral College votes for this purpose is complicated by the fact that in the earliest elections, the Electoral College did not distinguish between votes for president and vice-president, with the candidate receiving the second-highest number of such votes becoming the vice-president. As with the popular vote, the total number of Electoral College votes available has increased over time, as additional states have been admitted to the union. For a complete list of electoral votes received in individual elections, see the list of people who received an electoral vote in the United States Electoral College.

| Candidate | Electoral votes |
|---|---|
| Franklin D. Roosevelt | 1,876 |
| Richard Nixon | 1,040 |
| Ronald Reagan | 1,015 |
| Dwight D. Eisenhower | 899 |
| Donald Trump | 848 |
| Bill Clinton | 749 |
| Woodrow Wilson | 712 |
| Barack Obama | 697 |
| Grover Cleveland | 664 |
| George H. W. Bush | 594 |
| William McKinley | 563 |
| George W. Bush | 557 |
| Herbert Hoover | 503 |
| Ulysses S. Grant | 500 |
| Andrew Jackson | 496 |
| William Jennings Bryan | 493 |
| Lyndon B. Johnson | 486 |
| Theodore Roosevelt | 424 |
| James Monroe | 414 |
| Warren G. Harding | 404 |
| Abraham Lincoln | 392 |
| Calvin Coolidge | 382 |
| Benjamin Harrison | 378 |
| Jimmy Carter | 346 |
| William Howard Taft | 329 |
| William Henry Harrison | 307 |
| Joe Biden | 306 |
| Thomas Jefferson | 303 |
| Harry S. Truman | 303 |
| John F. Kennedy | 303 |
| Thomas E. Dewey | 288 |
| Al Gore | 266 |
| Charles Evans Hughes | 254 |
| Franklin Pierce | 254 |
| John Kerry | 251 |
| James Madison | 250 |
| John Adams | 247 |
| Gerald Ford | 240 |
| Martin Van Buren | 230 |
| Hillary Clinton | 227 |
| Kamala Harris | 226 |
| James A. Garfield | 214 |
| Mitt Romney | 206 |
| George Washington | 203 |
| Henry Clay | 191 |
| Hubert Humphrey | 191 |
| Rutherford B. Hayes | 185 |
| Samuel J. Tilden | 184 |
| James G. Blaine | 182 |
| James Buchanan | 174 |
| John McCain | 173 |
| James K. Polk | 170 |
| John Quincy Adams | 168 |
| Zachary Taylor | 163 |
| Adlai Stevenson II | 162 |
| Bob Dole | 159 |
| Winfield Scott Hancock | 155 |
| Alton B. Parker | 140 |
| John W. Davis | 136 |
| Lewis Cass | 127 |
| James M. Cox | 127 |
| John C. Frémont | 114 |
| Michael Dukakis | 111 |
| DeWitt Clinton | 89 |
| Al Smith | 87 |
| Wendell Willkie | 82 |
| Horatio Seymour | 80 |
| John C. Breckinridge | 72 |
| Charles Cotesworth Pinckney | 61 |
| Barry Goldwater | 52 |
| George Wallace | 46 |
| Thomas A. Hendricks | 42 |
| Winfield Scott | 42 |
| William H. Crawford | 41 |
| John Bell | 39 |
| Strom Thurmond | 39 |
| Rufus King | 34 |
| Hugh Lawson White | 26 |
| James B. Weaver | 22 |
| George B. McClellan | 21 |
| B. Gratz Brown | 18 |
| George McGovern | 17 |
| Harry F. Byrd | 15 |
| Daniel Webster | 14 |
| Robert M. La Follette | 13 |
| Walter Mondale | 13 |
| Stephen A. Douglas | 12 |
| John Floyd | 11 |
| Willie P. Mangum | 11 |
| Millard Fillmore | 8 |
| Alf Landon | 8 |
| William Wirt | 7 |
| George Clinton | 6 |
| Colin Powell | 3 |
| Charles J. Jenkins | 2 |
| Lloyd Bentsen | 1 |
| David Davis | 1 |
| John Edwards | 1 |
| John Hospers | 1 |
| Walter Burgwyn Jones | 1 |
| John Kasich | 1 |
| Ron Paul | 1 |
| Bernie Sanders | 1 |
| Faith Spotted Eagle | 1 |

== See also ==
- List of people who received an electoral vote in the United States Electoral College
- List of United States presidential elections by popular vote margin
- List of highest presidential election vote totals by U.S. state
- List of United States presidential elections in which the winner lost the popular vote
- List of United States presidential candidates by number of primary votes received
