= List of United States presidential candidates by number of primary votes received =

In United States presidential politics, voters within both the Democratic and Republican parties select their candidates for the presidential election through a series of primary elections. For this list, any candidate that received at least 250,000 total votes in an election year's primary contests or became their party's nominee will be included. Only elections conducted since nationwide primaries were instituted in 1972 are shown.

== History ==
The first state to hold a primary was Florida in 1901. In 1905, Wisconsin was the first state to hold a direct open primary. Five years later, in 1910, Oregon was the first state to hold a primary that bound its state's delegates to the convention based on election results. Between 1932 and 1968, twelve states held primaries consistently, while the remaining states chose which candidate received their delegates through state party bosses. In 1972, both parties held a primary or caucus in every state for the first time. However, Republican Richard Nixon was the incumbent president and was seeking re-election. As such, the Republican primary was uneventful that year, with Nixon winning every state easily. On the Democratic side, six candidates battled for the nomination. George McGovern of South Dakota won the first nationwide primary. Today, the first state to hold a caucus during primary season is Iowa, typically in early February. Shortly after that is the first primary, held in New Hampshire.

== List of candidates ==
=== Primary votes received by year ===
Became their party's nominee
Became president

Rank	Candidate	Party	Home state	Votes received	Year	Source
1	Joe Biden	Democratic	Delaware	19,076,052	2020	
2	Donald Trump	Republican	Florida	18,159,752	2020	
3	Hillary Clinton	Democratic	New York	17,857,501	2008	
4	Barack Obama	Democratic	Illinois	17,584,692	2008	
5	Hillary Clinton	Democratic	New York	16,917,853	2016	
6	Donald Trump	Republican	Florida	16,245,867	2024	
7	Joe Biden	Democratic	Delaware	14,183,228	2024	
8	Donald Trump	Republican	New York	14,015,993	2016	
9	Bernie Sanders	Democratic	Vermont	13,210,550	2016	
10	George W. Bush	Republican	Texas	12,089,564	2000	
11	Al Gore	Democratic	Tennessee	10,642,105	2000	
12	Bill Clinton	Democratic	Arkansas	10,482,411	1992	
13	Mitt Romney	Republican	Massachusetts	10,048,134	2012	
14	John Kerry	Democratic	Massachusetts	10,045,891	2004	
15	Jimmy Carter	Democratic	Georgia	10,043,016	1980	
16	Michael Dukakis	Democratic	Massachusetts	9,898,750	1988	
17	Bill Clinton	Democratic	Arkansas	9,706,802	1996	
18	Bernie Sanders	Democratic	Vermont	9,679,213	2020	
19	John McCain	Republican	Arizona	9,615,533	2008	
20	George H. W. Bush	Republican	Texas	9,199,463	1992	
21	Bob Dole	Republican	Kansas	9,024,742	1996	
22	George H. W. Bush	Republican	Texas	8,258,512	1988	
23	Barack Obama	Democratic	Illinois	8,044,659	2012	
24	George W. Bush	Republican	Texas	7,853,863	2004	
25	Ted Cruz	Republican	Texas	7,822,100	2016	
26	Ronald Reagan	Republican	California	7,709,793	1980	
27	Ted Kennedy	Democratic	Massachusetts	7,381,693	1980	
28	Walter Mondale	Democratic	Minnesota	6,952,912	1984	
29	Jesse Jackson	Democratic	South Carolina	6,788,991	1988	
30	Gary Hart	Democratic	Colorado	6,504,842	1984	
31	Ronald Reagan	Republican	California	6,484,987	1984	
32	Jimmy Carter	Democratic	Georgia	6,235,609	1976	
33	John McCain	Republican	Arizona	6,070,050	2000	
34	Gerald Ford	Republican	Michigan	5,529,899	1976	
35	Richard Nixon	Republican	California	5,378,704	1972	
36	Ronald Reagan	Republican	California	4,760,222	1976	
37	Mitt Romney	Republican	Massachusetts	4,567,127	2008	
38	Nikki Haley	Republican	South Carolina	4,373,783	2024	
39	John Kasich	Republican	Ohio	4,290,448	2016	
40	Mike Huckabee	Republican	Arkansas	4,147,961	2008	
41	Hubert Humphrey	Democratic	Minnesota	4,121,372	1972	
42	Jerry Brown	Democratic	California	4,071,232	1992	
43	George McGovern	Democratic	South Dakota	4,053,451	1972	
44	Rick Santorum	Republican	Pennsylvania	3,938,527	2012	
45	George Wallace	Democratic	Alabama	3,755,424	1972	
46	Paul Tsongas	Democratic	Massachusetts	3,696,010	1992	
47	Marco Rubio	Republican	Florida	3,515,576	2016	
48	Jesse Jackson	Democratic	Illinois	3,282,431	1984	
49	John Edwards	Democratic	North Carolina	3,207,048	2004	
50	Al Gore	Democratic	Tennessee	3,185,806	1988	
51	Pat Buchanan	Republican	Virginia	3,184,943	1996	
52	George H. W. Bush	Republican	Texas	3,070,033	1980	
53	Pat Buchanan	Republican	Virginia	2,899,488	1992	
54	Elizabeth Warren	Democratic	Massachusetts	2,831,472	2020	
55	Bill Bradley	Democratic	New Jersey	2,804,945	2000	
56	Newt Gingrich	Republican	Georgia	2,737,442	2012	
57	Michael Bloomberg	Democratic	New York	2,488,734	2020	
58	Jerry Brown	Democratic	California	2,449,374	1976	
59	Bob Dole	Republican	Kansas	2,333,375	1988	
60	Ron Paul	Republican	Texas	2,099,441	2012	
61	George Wallace	Democratic	Alabama	1,955,388	1976	
62	Edmund Muskie	Democratic	Maine	1,840,217	1972	
63	Steve Forbes	Republican	New York	1,751,187	1996	
64	Mo Udall	Democratic	Arizona	1,611,754	1976	
65	John Anderson	Republican	Illinois	1,572,174	1980	
66	Dick Gephardt	Democratic	Missouri	1,399,041	1988	
67	Ron Paul	Republican	Texas	1,145,138	2008	
68	Henry Jackson	Democratic	Washington	1,134,375	1976	
69	Pat Robertson	Republican	Virginia	1,097,446	1988	
70	Paul Simon	Democratic	Illinois	1,082,960	1988	
71	Alan Keyes	Republican	Maryland	995,555	2000	
72	John Edwards	Democratic	North Carolina	994,029	2008	
73	Howard Dean	Democratic	Vermont	937,015	2004	
74	Pete Buttigieg	Democratic	Indiana	924,237	2020	
75	Ben Carson	Republican	Florida	857,039	2016	
76	Frank Church	Democratic	Idaho	830,818	1976	
77	Dennis Kucinich	Democratic	Ohio	643,067	2004	
78	John Glenn	Democratic	Ohio	617,909	1984	
79	Lyndon LaRouche	Democratic	Virginia	596,422	1996	
80	Rudy Giuliani	Republican	New York	592,391	2008	
81	Jerry Brown	Democratic	California	575,296	1980	
82	Wesley Clark	Democratic	Arkansas	572,207	2004	
83	Eugene McCarthy	Democratic	Minnesota	553,990	1972	
84	Amy Klobuchar	Democratic	Minnesota	529,713	2020	
85	Dean Phillips	Democratic	Minnesota	529,486	2020	
86	Henry Jackson	Democratic	Washington	505,198	1972	
87	Lamar Alexander	Republican	Tennessee	495,590	1996	
88	Marianne Williamson	Democratic	California	473,463	2024	
89	Alan Keyes	Republican	Maryland	471,716	1996	
90	Bill Weld	Republican	Massachusetts	453,959	2020	
91	Shirley Chisholm	Democratic	New York	430,703	1972	
92	Gary Hart	Democratic	Colorado	415,716	1988	
93	Al Sharpton	Democratic	New York	383,683	2004	
94	Ron DeSantis	Republican	Florida	353,615	2024	
95	Robert Byrd	Democratic	West Virginia	340,309	1976	
96	George McGovern	Democratic	South Dakota	334,801	1984	
97	Terry Sanford	Democratic	North Carolina	331,415	1972	
98	Jack Kemp	Republican	New York	331,333	1988	
99	Bob Kerrey	Democratic	Nebraska	318,457	1992	
100	John M. Ashbrook	Republican	Ohio	311,543	1972	
101	Lyndon LaRouche	Democratic	Virginia	306,772	2000	
102	Sargent Shriver	Democratic	Maryland	304,399	1976	
103	Fred Thompson	Republican	Tennessee	287,581	2008	
104	Jeb Bush	Republican	Florida	286,694	2016	
105	Tom Harkin	Democratic	Iowa	280,340	1992	
106	Tulsi Gabbard	Democratic	Hawaii	273,940	2020	
107	Tom Steyer	Democratic	California	259,792	2020	
108	Kamala Harris	Democratic	California	844	2020	
109	Kamala Harris	Democratic	California	n/a (Note: After incumbent President Joe Biden withdrew from the 2024 Presidential Election, his running mate, Vice President Kamala Harris, became their party's nominee at the 2024 Democratic National Convention even without having run in the primaries.)	2024	

=== Cumulative primary votes ===
Rank	Candidate	Party	Home state	Votes received	Year(s)
1	Donald Trump	Republican	NY, FL	47,559,705	2016, 2020, 2024
2	Hillary Clinton	Democratic	New York	34,775,354	2008, 2016
3	Joe Biden	Democratic	Delaware	33,339,034	2008, 2020, 2024
4	Barack Obama	Democratic	Illinois	25,629,351	2008, 2012
5	Bernie Sanders	Democratic	Vermont	22,889,763	2016, 2020
6	George H. W. Bush	Republican	Texas	20,528,008	1980, 1988, 1992
7	Bill Clinton	Democratic	Arkansas	20,189,213	1992, 1996
8	George W. Bush	Republican	Texas	19,943,427	2000, 2004
9	Ronald Reagan	Republican	California	18,955,002	1976, 1980, 1984
10	Jimmy Carter	Democratic	Georgia	16,278,625	1976, 1980
11	John McCain	Republican	Arizona	15,685,583	2000, 2008
12	Mitt Romney	Republican	Massachusetts	14,615,261	2008, 2012
13	Al Gore	Democratic	Tennessee	13,827,911	1988, 2000
14	Bob Dole	Republican	Kansas	11,365,321	1980, 1988, 1996
15	Jesse Jackson	Democratic	South Carolina	10,071,422	1984, 1988
16	John Kerry	Democratic	Massachusetts	10,045,891	2004
17	Michael Dukakis	Democratic	Massachusetts	9,898,750	1988
18	Ted Cruz	Republican	Texas	7,822,100	2016
19	Ted Kennedy	Democratic	Massachusetts	7,381,693	1980
20	Jerry Brown	Democratic	California	7,095,902	1976, 1980, 1992
21	Walter Mondale	Democratic	Minnesota	6,952,912	1984
22	Gary Hart	Democratic	Colorado	6,920,558	1984, 1988
23	Pat Buchanan	Republican	Virginia	6,084,431	1992, 1996
24	George Wallace	Democratic	Alabama	5,710,812	1972, 1976
25	Gerald Ford	Republican	Michigan	5,529,899	1976
26	Richard Nixon	Republican	California	5,378,704	1972
27	George McGovern	Democratic	South Dakota	4,388,252	1972, 1984
28	John Kasich	Republican	Ohio	4,290,448	2016
29	John Edwards	Democratic	North Carolina	4,201,077	2004, 2008
30	Mike Huckabee	Republican	Arkansas	4,199,411	2008, 2016
31	Hubert Humphrey	Democratic	Minnesota	4,183,364	1972, 1976
32	Rick Santorum	Republican	Pennsylvania	3,955,154	2012, 2016
33	Paul Tsongas	Democratic	Massachusetts	3,696,010	1992
34	Marco Rubio	Republican	Florida	3,515,576	2016
35	Ron Paul	Republican	Texas	3,259,844	2008, 2012
36	Elizabeth Warren	Democratic	Massachusetts	2,831,472	2020
37	Bill Bradley	Democratic	New Jersey	2,804,945	2000
38	Newt Gingrich	Republican	Georgia	2,737,442	2012
39	Michael Bloomberg	Democratic	New York	2,488,734	2020
40	Steve Forbes	Republican	New York	1,923,047	1996, 2000
41	Edmund Muskie	Democratic	Maine	1,840,217	1972
42	Henry M. Jackson	Democratic	Washington	1,639,573	1972, 1976
43	Mo Udall	Democratic	Arizona	1,611,754	1976
44	John B. Anderson	Republican	Illinois	1,572,174	1980
45	Alan Keyes	Republican	Maryland	1,467,271	1996, 2000
46	Dick Gephardt	Democratic	Missouri	1,462,943	1988, 2004
47	Pat Robertson	Republican	Virginia	1,097,446	1988
48	Paul Simon	Democratic	Illinois	1,082,960	1988
49	Lyndon LaRouche	Democratic	Virginia	1,080,978	1980, 1996, 2000
50	Howard Dean	Democratic	Vermont	937,015	2004
51	Pete Buttigieg	Democratic	Indiana	924,237	2020
52	Ben Carson	Republican	Florida	857,039	2016
53	Frank Church	Democratic	Idaho	830,818	1976
54	Dennis Kucinich	Democratic	Ohio	743,030	2004, 2008
55	John Glenn	Democratic	Ohio	617,909	1984
56	Rudy Giuliani	Republican	New York	592,391	2008
57	Wesley Clark	Democratic	Arkansas	572,207	2004
58	Eugene McCarthy	Democratic	Minnesota	553,990	1972
59	Amy Klobuchar	Democratic	Minnesota	529,713	2020
60	Lamar Alexander	Republican	Tennessee	495,590	1996
61	Bill Weld	Republican	Massachusetts	453,959	2020
62	Shirley Chisholm	Democratic	New York	430,703	1972
63	Al Sharpton	Democratic	New York	383,683	2004
64	Robert Byrd	Democratic	West Virginia	340,309	1976
65	Terry Sanford	Democratic	North Carolina	331,415	1972
66	Jack Kemp	Republican	New York	331,333	1988
67	Bob Kerrey	Democratic	Nebraska	318,457	1992
68	John M. Ashbrook	Republican	Ohio	311,543	1972
69	Sargent Shriver	Democratic	Maryland	304,399	1976
70	Fred Thompson	Republican	Tennessee	287,581	2008
71	Jeb Bush	Republican	Florida	286,694	2016
72	Tom Harkin	Democratic	Iowa	280,340	1992
73	Tulsi Gabbard	Democratic	Hawaii	273,940	2020
74	Tom Steyer	Democratic	California	259,792	2020
75	Kamala Harris	Democratic	California	844	2020 (Note: While Vice President Kamala Harris was the candidate for the 2024 presidential elections, she was only designated on July 21st, after all popular contests were over, hence she did not run in the primaries, only in the roll call voting for the convention.)

== See also ==
- List of United States presidential candidates by number of votes received
