= Kansas Day =

Anniversary of admittance to the Union, January 29

- Observed by: Kansas
- Significance: Admission of Kansas into the Union
- Date: January 29
- Frequency: Annual
- Related to: Independence Day

The Flag of Kansas

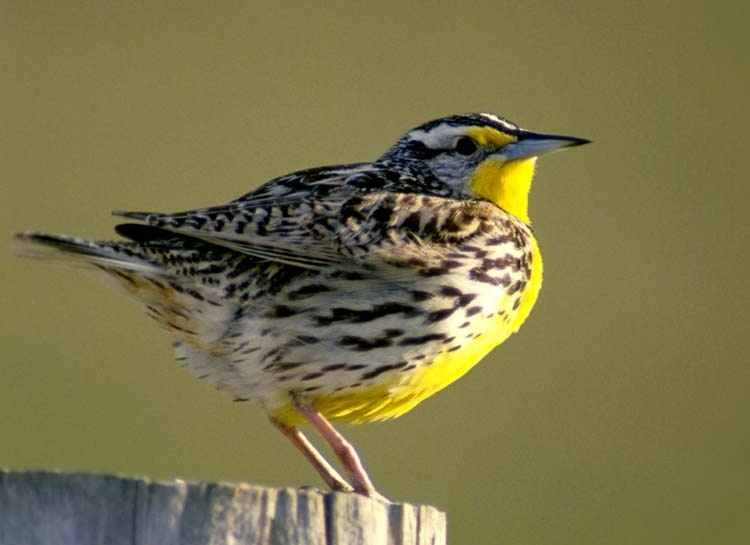
The Western Meadowlark, state bird

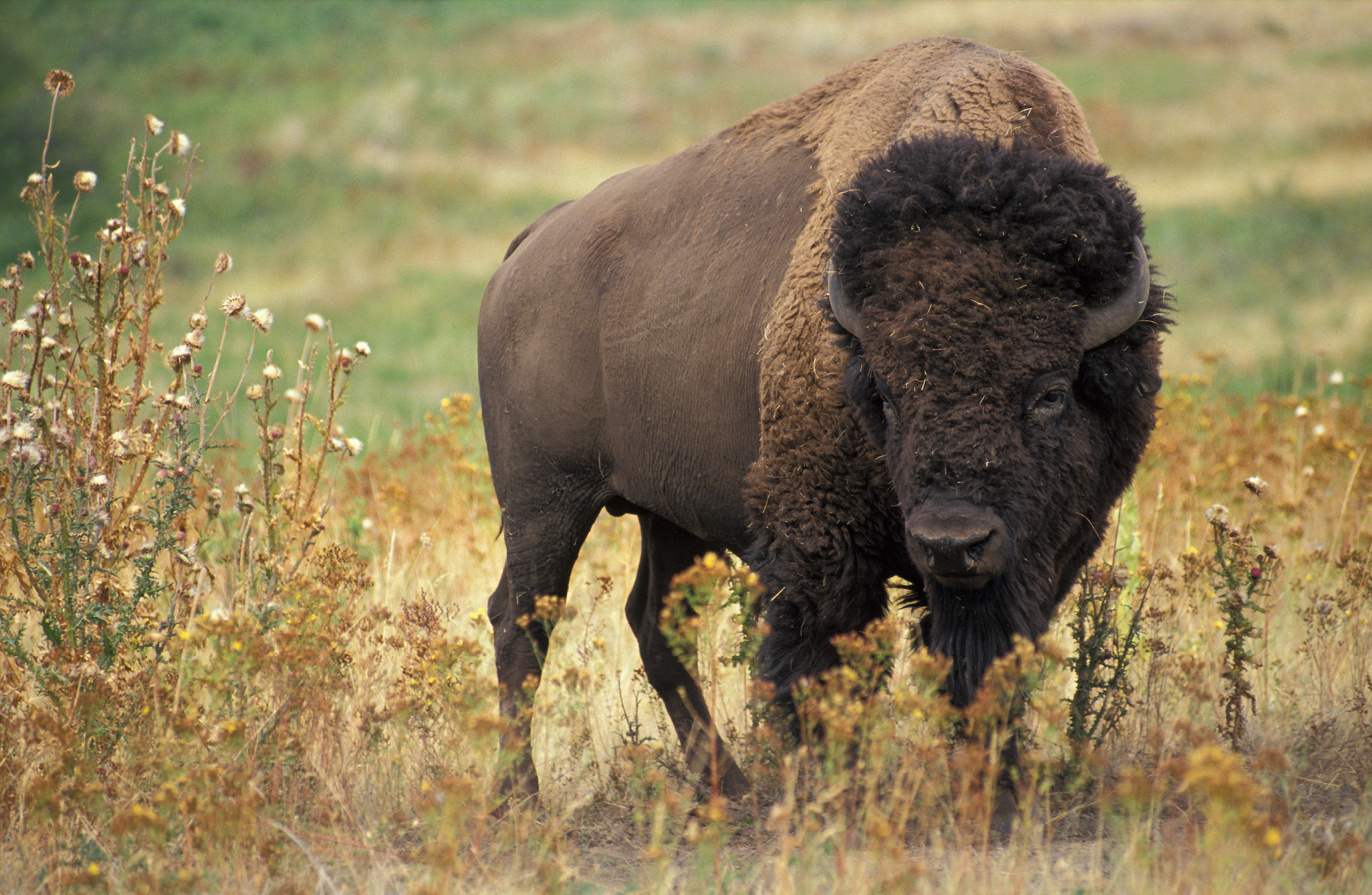
The American Bison, state mammal

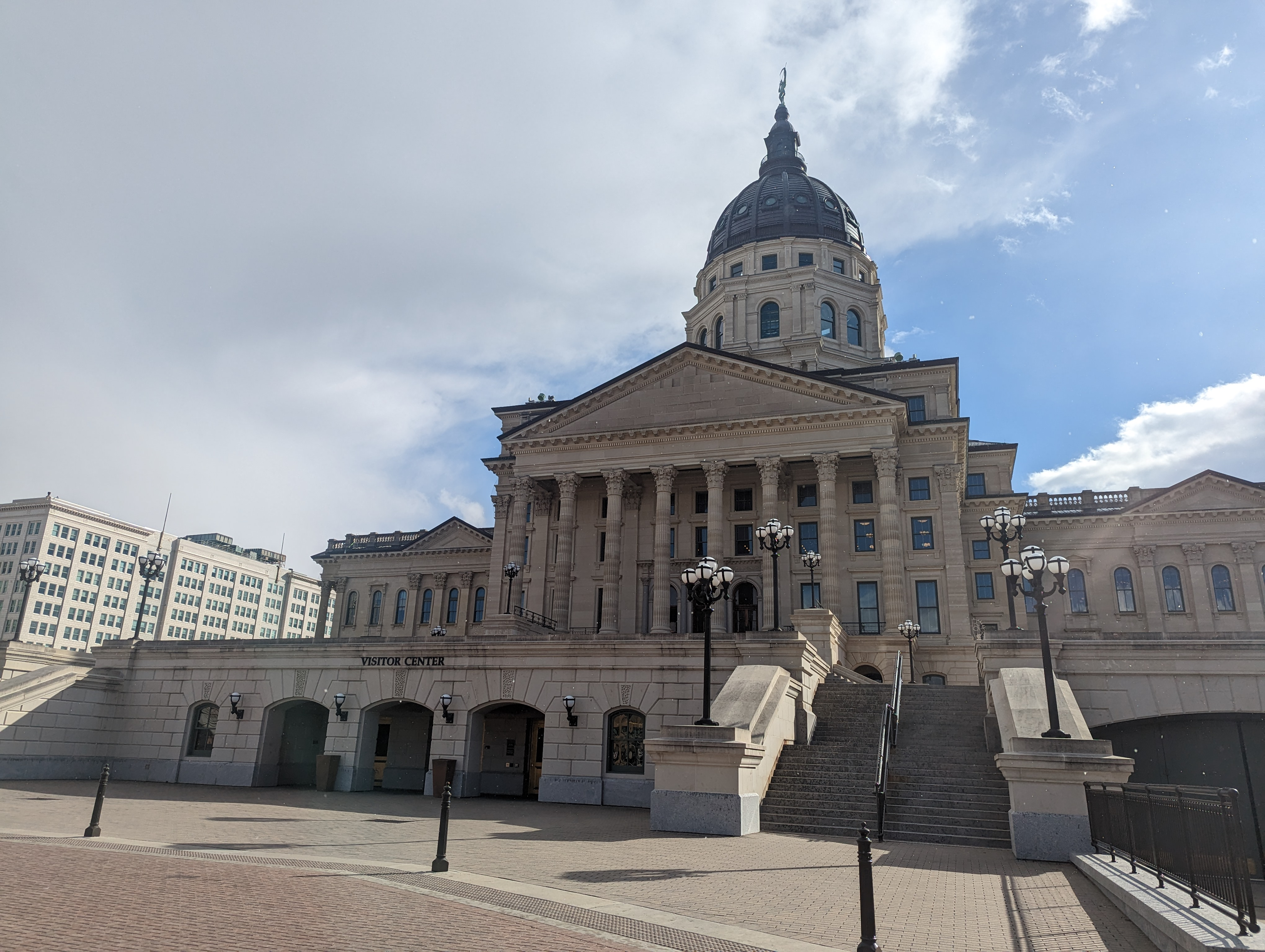
Kansas State Capitol, Topeka

Kansas Day is a holiday in the state of Kansas in the United States. It is celebrated annually on January 29 to commemorate the anniversary of the state's 1861 admission to the Union. It was first celebrated in 1877 by schoolchildren in Paola.

Annual Kansas Day celebrations include school field trips and special projects to study the history of Kansas, pioneer-style meals, special visits by students to the Kansas Statehouse in Topeka, Kansas, performances of Home on the Range, the Kansas State Song, and special proclamations by the Governor of Kansas and members of the Kansas Legislature.

The Sunflower Showdown basketball game between the Kansas Jayhawks and the Kansas State Wildcats is occasionally played on or around Kansas Day to celebrate the state's history.
