= List of people who received an electoral vote in the United States Electoral College =

The following is a complete list of people who received an electoral vote in a United States presidential election. Prior to the adoption of the Twelfth Amendment which came into effect for the 1804 election each elector cast two votes without any distinction between a vote for president and vice-president, with the runner-up in the Electoral College becoming vice-president.

This list includes eleven women, nine of whom received vice presidential votes: the first was Tonie Nathan who in 1972 received one vote from a faithless elector. This was followed by Geraldine Ferraro in 1984 and Sarah Palin in 2008. Maria Cantwell, Susan Collins, Carly Fiorina and Winona LaDuke all received a single faithless vote for vice president in 2016, and in that same election Elizabeth Warren received two. Hillary Clinton and Faith Spotted Eagle in 2016 were the first women to receive electoral votes for president; Spotted Eagle's single vote was from a faithless elector, and she was also the first Native American to receive an electoral vote for president. Kamala Harris became the first female vice president after the 2020 election.

== Special cases ==
17 electors did not cast votes:

- Two Maryland electors and two Virginia electors in 1788.
- Two Maryland electors and one Vermont elector in 1792.
- A Kentucky elector in 1808.
- An Ohio elector in 1812.
- Three Maryland electors and one Delaware elector in 1816.
- Two Maryland electors in 1832.
- A Nevada elector in 1864.
- A Washington, DC elector, Barbara Lett-Simmons, in 2000.

There are also two cases where votes were rejected by Congress:

- In 1864, 17 electoral votes from Louisiana and Tennessee (received by Abraham Lincoln) were rejected due to issues relating to the American Civil War.
- In 1872:
  - 14 votes from Arkansas and Louisiana (received by Ulysses S. Grant) were rejected due to various irregularities, including allegations of electoral fraud.
  - Three electoral votes from Georgia (received by Horace Greeley) were rejected as the votes were cast after Greeley's death.

== List ==
For all elections from 1804 onwards, "P" denotes a presidential vote, and "VP" denotes a vice presidential vote. Bold entries are successful candidates; Italicized entries are runners-up who became vice president under the original system (1788–1800).

Candidate	State	Election	Party	Electoral votes		
Candidate	State	Election	Party	#	for	%
John Adams	MA	1789	Pro-Administration	34	–	24.6
John Adams	MA	1792	Federalist	77	–	29.2
John Adams	MA	1796	Federalist	71	–	25.7
John Adams	MA	1800	Federalist	65	–	23.6
John Quincy Adams	MA	1820	Democratic-Republican	1	P	0.4
John Quincy Adams	MA	1824	Democratic-Republican	84	P	32.2
John Quincy Adams	MA	1828	National Republican	83	P	31.8
Samuel Adams	MA	1796	Democratic-Republican	15	–	5.4
Spiro Agnew	MD	1968	Republican	301	VP	55.9
Spiro Agnew	MD	1972	Republican	520	VP	96.7
James Armstrong	GA	1789	Pro-Administration	1	–	0.7
Chester A. Arthur	NY	1880	Republican	214	VP	58.0
Nathaniel Prentice Banks	MA	1872	Liberal Republican	1	VP	0.3
Alben W. Barkley	KY	1948	Democratic	303	VP	57.1
John Bell	TN	1860	Constitutional Union	39	P	12.9
Lloyd Bentsen	TX	1988	Democratic	111	VP	20.6
Lloyd Bentsen	TX	1988	Democratic	1	P	0.2
Joe Biden	DE	2008	Democratic	365	VP	67.8
Joe Biden	DE	2012	Democratic	332	VP	61.7
Joe Biden	DE	2020	Democratic	306	P	56.8
James G. Blaine	ME	1884	Republican	182	P	45.4
Francis Preston Blair Jr.	MO	1868	Democratic	80	VP	27.2
Thomas E. Bramlette	KY	1872	Democratic	3	VP	0.9
John C. Breckinridge	KY	1856	Democratic	174	VP	58.8
John C. Breckinridge	KY	1860	Democratic	72	P	23.8
John W. Bricker	OH	1944	Republican	99	VP	18.6
Benjamin Gratz Brown	MO	1872	Liberal Republican	18	P	5.2
Benjamin Gratz Brown	MO	1872	Liberal Republican	47	VP	13.4
Charles W. Bryan	NE	1924	Democratic	136	VP	25.6
William Jennings Bryan	NE	1896	Democratic / Populist	176	P	39.4
William Jennings Bryan	NE	1900	Democratic	155	P	34.7
William Jennings Bryan	NE	1908	Democratic	162	P	33.5
James Buchanan	PA	1856	Democratic	174	P	58.8
Aaron Burr	NY	1792	Democratic-Republican	1	–	0.4
Aaron Burr	NY	1796	Democratic-Republican	30	–	10.9
Aaron Burr	NY	1800	Democratic-Republican	73	–	26.4
George H. W. Bush	TX	1980	Republican	489	VP	90.9
George H. W. Bush	TX	1984	Republican	525	VP	97.6
George H. W. Bush	TX	1988	Republican	426	P	79.2
George H. W. Bush	TX	1992	Republican	168	P	31.2
George W. Bush	TX	2000	Republican	271	P	50.4
George W. Bush	TX	2004	Republican	286	P	53.2
Nicholas Murray Butler	NY	1912	Republican	8	VP	1.5
William Orlando Butler	KY	1848	Democratic	127	VP	43.8
Harry F. Byrd	VA	1960	Democratic	15	P	2.8
John C. Calhoun	SC	1824	Democratic-Republican	182	VP	70.0
John C. Calhoun	SC	1828	Democratic	171	VP	65.5
Maria Cantwell	WA	2016	Democratic	1	VP	0.2
Jimmy Carter	GA	1976	Democratic	297	P	55.2
Jimmy Carter	GA	1980	Democratic	49	P	9.1
Lewis Cass	MI	1848	Democratic	127	P	43.8
Dick Cheney	WY	2000	Republican	271	VP	50.4
Dick Cheney	WY	2004	Republican	286	VP	53.2
Henry Clay	KY	1824	Democratic-Republican	37	P	14.2
Henry Clay	KY	1824	Democratic-Republican	2	VP	0.8
Henry Clay	KY	1832	National Republican	49	P	17.1
Henry Clay	KY	1844	Whig	105	P	38.2
Grover Cleveland	NY	1884	Democratic	219	P	54.6
Grover Cleveland	NY	1888	Democratic	168	P	41.9
Grover Cleveland	NY	1892	Democratic	277	P	62.4
Bill Clinton	AR	1992	Democratic	370	P	68.8
Bill Clinton	AR	1996	Democratic	379	P	70.4
DeWitt Clinton	NY	1812	Democratic-Republican	89	P	41.0
George Clinton	NY	1789	Anti-Federalist	3	–	2.2
George Clinton	NY	1792	Democratic-Republican	50	–	18.9
George Clinton	NY	1796	Democratic-Republican	7	–	2.5
George Clinton	NY	1804	Democratic-Republican	162	VP	92.0
George Clinton	NY	1808	Democratic-Republican	113	VP	64.6
George Clinton	NY	1808	Democratic-Republican	6	P	3.4
Hillary Clinton	NY	2016	Democratic	227	P	42.2
Schuyler Colfax	IN	1868	Republican	214	VP	72.8
Susan Collins	ME	2016	Republican	1	VP	0.2
Alfred H. Colquitt	GA	1872	Democratic	5	VP	1.4
Calvin Coolidge	MA	1920	Republican	404	VP	76.1
Calvin Coolidge	MA	1924	Republican	382	P	71.9
James M. Cox	OH	1920	Democratic	127	P	23.9
William H. Crawford	GA	1824	Democratic-Republican	41	P	15.7
Charles Curtis	KS	1928	Republican	444	VP	83.6
Charles Curtis	KS	1932	Republican	59	VP	11.1
George M. Dallas	PA	1844	Democratic	170	VP	61.8
David Davis	IL	1872	Independent	1	P	0.3
Henry G. Davis	WV	1904	Democratic	140	VP	29.4
John W. Davis	WV	1924	Democratic	136	P	25.6
Charles G. Dawes	IL	1924	Republican	382	VP	71.9
William L. Dayton	NJ	1856	Republican	114	VP	38.5
Thomas E. Dewey	NY	1944	Republican	99	P	18.6
Thomas E. Dewey	NY	1948	Republican	189	P	35.6
Bob Dole	KS	1976	Republican	241	VP	44.8
Bob Dole	KS	1996	Republican	159	P	29.6
Andrew Jackson Donelson	TN	1856	American	8	VP	2.7
Stephen A. Douglas	IL	1860	Democratic	12	P	4.0
Michael Dukakis	MA	1988	Democratic	111	P	20.6
Michael Dukakis	MA	1988	Democratic	1	VP	0.2
John Edwards	NC	2004	Democratic	252	VP	46.8
John Edwards	NC	2004	Democratic	1	P	0.2
Dwight D. Eisenhower	KS	1952	Republican	442	P	83.2
Dwight D. Eisenhower	KS	1956	Republican	457	P	86.0
William H. English	IN	1880	Democratic	155	VP	42.0
Amos Ellmaker	PA	1832	Anti-Masonic	7	VP	2.4
Oliver Ellsworth	CT	1796	Federalist	11	–	4.0
Edward Everett	MA	1860	Constitutional Union	39	VP	12.9
Charles W. Fairbanks	IN	1904	Republican	336	VP	70.6
Charles W. Fairbanks	IN	1916	Republican	254	VP	47.8
Geraldine Ferraro	NY	1984	Democratic	13	VP	2.4
James G. Field	VA	1892	Populist	22	VP	5.0
Millard Fillmore	NY	1848	Whig	163	VP	56.2
Millard Fillmore	NY	1856	American	8	P	2.7
Carly Fiorina	VA	2016	Republican	1	VP	0.2
John Floyd	VA	1832	Nullifier	11	P	3.8
Gerald Ford	MI	1976	Republican	240	P	44.6
Theodore Frelinghuysen	NY	1844	Whig	105	VP	38.2
John C. Frémont	CA	1856	Republican	114	P	38.5
James A. Garfield	OH	1880	Republican	214	P	58.0
John Nance Garner	TX	1932	Democratic	472	VP	88.9
John Nance Garner	TX	1936	Democratic	523	VP	98.5
Elbridge Gerry	MA	1812	Democratic-Republican	131	VP	60.4
Barry Goldwater	AZ	1960	Republican	1	VP	0.2
Barry Goldwater	AZ	1964	Republican	52	P	9.7
Al Gore	TN	1992	Democratic	370	VP	68.8
Al Gore	TN	1996	Democratic	379	VP	70.4
Al Gore	TN	2000	Democratic	266	P	49.4
William Alexander Graham	NC	1852	Whig	42	VP	14.2
Francis Granger	NY	1836	Whig	77	VP	26.2
Ulysses S. Grant	OH	1868	Republican	214	P	72.8
Ulysses S. Grant	OH	1872	Republican	286	P	81.9
William S. Groesbeck	OH	1872	Liberal Republican	1	VP	0.3
Hannibal Hamlin	ME	1860	Republican	180	VP	59.4
John Hancock	MA	1789	Pro-Administration	4	–	2.9
Winfield Scott Hancock	PA	1880	Democratic	155	P	42.0
Warren G. Harding	OH	1920	Republican	404	P	76.1
Robert Goodloe Harper	MD	1816	Federalist	3	VP	1.4
Robert Goodloe Harper	MD	1820	Federalist	1	VP	0.4
Kamala Harris	CA	2020	Democratic	306	VP	56.8
Kamala Harris	CA	2024	Democratic	226	P	42.0
Benjamin Harrison	IN	1888	Republican	233	P	58.1
Benjamin Harrison	IN	1892	Republican	145	P	32.7
Robert H. Harrison	MD	1789	Pro-Administration	6	–	4.3
William Henry Harrison	OH	1836	Whig	73	P	24.8
William Henry Harrison	OH	1840	Whig	234	P	79.6
Rutherford B. Hayes	OH	1876	Republican	185	P	50.1
Thomas A. Hendricks	IN	1872	Democratic	42	P	12.0
Thomas A. Hendricks	IN	1876	Democratic	184	VP	49.9
Thomas A. Hendricks	IN	1884	Democratic	219	VP	54.6
John Henry	MD	1796	Democratic-Republican	2	–	0.7
Garret Hobart	NJ	1896	Republican	271	VP	60.6
Herbert Hoover	CA	1928	Republican	444	P	83.6
Herbert Hoover	CA	1932	Republican	59	P	11.1
John Hospers	CA	1972	Libertarian	1	P	0.2
John Eager Howard	MD	1816	Federalist	22	VP	10.1
Charles Evans Hughes	NY	1916	Republican	254	P	47.8
Hubert Humphrey	MN	1964	Democratic	486	VP	90.3
Hubert Humphrey	MN	1968	Democratic	191	P	35.5
Samuel Huntington	CT	1789	Pro-Administration	2	–	1.4
Jared Ingersoll	PA	1812	Federalist	86	VP	39.6
James Iredell	NC	1796	Federalist	3	–	1.1
Andrew Jackson	TN	1824	Democratic-Republican	99	P	37.9
Andrew Jackson	TN	1824	Democratic-Republican	13	VP	5.0
Andrew Jackson	TN	1828	Democratic	178	P	68.2
Andrew Jackson	TN	1832	Democratic	219	P	76.6
John Jay	NY	1789	Pro-Administration	9	–	6.5
John Jay	NY	1796	Federalist	5	–	1.8
John Jay	NY	1800	Federalist	1	–	0.4
Thomas Jefferson	VA	1792	Democratic-Republican	4	–	1.5
Thomas Jefferson	VA	1796	Democratic-Republican	68	–	24.6
Thomas Jefferson	VA	1800	Democratic-Republican	73	–	26.4
Thomas Jefferson	VA	1804	Democratic-Republican	162	P	92.0
Charles J. Jenkins	GA	1872	Democratic	2	P	0.6
Andrew Johnson	TN	1864	National Union (Dem.)	212	VP	91.0
Herschel Vespasian Johnson	GA	1860	Democratic	12	VP	4.0
Hiram Johnson	CA	1912	Progressive (Bull Moose)	88	VP	16.6
Lyndon B. Johnson	TX	1960	Democratic	303	VP	56.4
Lyndon B. Johnson	TX	1964	Democratic	486	P	90.3
Richard Mentor Johnson	KY	1836	Democratic	147	VP	50.0
Richard Mentor Johnson	KY	1840	Democratic	48	VP	16.3
Samuel Johnston	NC	1796	Federalist	2	–	0.7
Walter Burgwyn Jones	AL	1956	Democratic	1	P	0.2
George Washington Julian	IN	1872	Liberal Republican	5	VP	1.4
Tim Kaine	VA	2016	Democratic	227	VP	42.2
John Kasich	OH	2016	Republican	1	P	0.2
Estes Kefauver	TN	1956	Democratic	73	VP	13.7
Jack Kemp	NY	1996	Republican	159	VP	29.6
John F. Kennedy	MA	1960	Democratic	303	P	56.4
John W. Kern	IN	1908	Democratic	162	VP	33.5
John Kerry	MA	2004	Democratic	251	P	46.7
Rufus King	NY	1804	Federalist	14	VP	8.0
Rufus King	NY	1808	Federalist	47	VP	26.9
Rufus King	NY	1816	Federalist	34	P	15.7
William R. King	AL	1852	Democratic	254	VP	85.8
Frank Knox	IL	1936	Republican	8	VP	1.5
Winona LaDuke	MN	2016	Green	1	VP	0.2
Robert M. La Follette Sr.	WI	1924	Progressive (1924)	13	P	2.4
Alf Landon	KS	1936	Republican	8	P	1.5
Joseph Lane	OR	1860	Democratic	72	VP	23.8
John Langdon	NH	1808	Democratic-Republican	9	VP	5.1
Henry Lee	MA	1832	Nullifier	11	VP	3.8
Curtis LeMay	CA	1968	American Independent	46	VP	8.6
Joe Lieberman	CT	2000	Democratic	266	VP	49.4
Abraham Lincoln	IL	1860	Republican	180	P	59.4
Abraham Lincoln	IL	1864	National Union (Rep.)	212	P	91.0
Benjamin Lincoln	MA	1789	Pro-Administration	1	–	0.7
Henry Cabot Lodge Jr.	MA	1960	Republican	219	VP	40.8
John A. Logan	IL	1884	Republican	182	VP	45.4
Willis Benson Machen	KY	1872	Democratic	1	VP	0.3
Nathaniel Macon	NC	1824	Democratic-Republican	24	VP	9.2
James Madison	VA	1808	Democratic-Republican	122	P	69.7
James Madison	VA	1808	Democratic-Republican	3	VP	1.7
James Madison	VA	1812	Democratic-Republican	128	P	59.0
Willie Person Mangum	NC	1836	Whig	11	P	3.7
John Marshall	VA	1816	Federalist	4	VP	1.8
Thomas R. Marshall	IN	1912	Democratic	435	VP	81.9
Thomas R. Marshall	IN	1916	Democratic	277	VP	52.2
John McCain	AZ	2008	Republican	173	P	32.2
George B. McClellan	NJ	1864	Democratic	21	P	9.0
George McGovern	SD	1972	Democratic	17	P	3.2
William McKinley	OH	1896	Republican	271	P	60.6
William McKinley	OH	1900	Republican	292	P	65.3
Charles L. McNary	OR	1940	Republican	82	VP	15.4
William E. Miller	NY	1964	Republican	52	VP	9.7
John Milton	GA	1789	Pro-Administration	2	–	1.4
Walter Mondale	MN	1976	Democratic	297	VP	55.2
Walter Mondale	MN	1980	Democratic	49	VP	9.1
Walter Mondale	MN	1984	Democratic	13	P	2.4
James Monroe	VA	1808	Democratic-Republican	3	VP	1.7
James Monroe	VA	1816	Democratic-Republican	183	P	84.3
James Monroe	VA	1820	Democratic-Republican	231	P	99.6
Levi P. Morton	NY	1888	Republican	233	VP	58.1
Edmund Muskie	ME	1968	Democratic	191	VP	35.5
Theodora Nathalia Nathan	OR	1972	Libertarian	1	VP	0.2
Richard Nixon	CA	1952	Republican	442	VP	83.2
Richard Nixon	CA	1956	Republican	457	VP	86.0
Richard Nixon	CA	1960	Republican	219	P	40.8
Richard Nixon	NY	1968	Republican	301	P	55.9
Richard Nixon	CA	1972	Republican	520	P	96.7
Barack Obama	IL	2008	Democratic	365	P	67.8
Barack Obama	IL	2012	Democratic	332	P	61.7
Sarah Palin	AK	2008	Republican	173	VP	32.2
John Palmer	IL	1872	Liberal Republican	3	VP	0.9
Alton B. Parker	NY	1904	Democratic	140	P	29.4
Ron Paul	TX	2016	Libertarian	1	P	0.2
Mike Pence	IN	2016	Republican	305	VP	56.7
Mike Pence	IN	2020	Republican	232	VP	43.1
George H. Pendleton	OH	1864	Democratic	21	VP	9.0
Franklin Pierce	NH	1852	Democratic	254	P	85.8
Charles Cotesworth Pinckney	SC	1796	Federalist	1	–	0.4
Charles Cotesworth Pinckney	SC	1800	Federalist	64	–	23.2
Charles Cotesworth Pinckney	SC	1804	Federalist	14	P	8.0
Charles Cotesworth Pinckney	SC	1808	Federalist	47	P	26.9
Thomas Pinckney	SC	1796	Federalist	59	–	21.4
James K. Polk	TN	1840	Democratic	1	VP	0.3
James K. Polk	TN	1844	Democratic	170	P	61.8
Colin Powell	VA	2016	Republican	3	P	0.6
Dan Quayle	IN	1988	Republican	426	VP	79.2
Dan Quayle	IN	1992	Republican	168	VP	31.2
Ronald Reagan	CA	1976	Republican	1	P	0.2
Ronald Reagan	CA	1980	Republican	489	P	90.9
Ronald Reagan	CA	1984	Republican	525	P	97.6
Whitelaw Reid	NY	1892	Republican	145	VP	32.7
Daniel Rodney	DE	1820	Federalist	4	VP	1.7
Joseph Taylor Robinson	AR	1928	Democratic	87	VP	16.4
Mitt Romney	MA	2012	Republican	206	P	38.3
Franklin D. Roosevelt	NY	1920	Democratic	127	VP	23.9
Franklin D. Roosevelt	NY	1932	Democratic	472	P	88.9
Franklin D. Roosevelt	NY	1936	Democratic	523	P	98.5
Franklin D. Roosevelt	NY	1940	Democratic	449	P	84.6
Franklin D. Roosevelt	NY	1944	Democratic	432	P	81.4
Theodore Roosevelt	NY	1900	Republican	292	VP	65.3
Theodore Roosevelt	NY	1904	Republican	336	P	70.6
Theodore Roosevelt	NY	1912	Progressive (Bull Moose)	88	P	16.6
James Ross	PA	1816	Federalist	5	VP	2.3
Richard Rush	PA	1820	Federalist	1	VP	0.4
Richard Rush	PA	1828	National Republican	83	VP	31.8
John Rutledge	SC	1789	Pro-Administration	6	–	4.3
Paul Ryan	WI	2012	Republican	206	VP	38.3
Bernie Sanders	VT	2016	Democratic	1	P	0.2
Nathan Sanford	NY	1824	Democratic-Republican	30	VP	11.5
Winfield Scott	NJ	1852	Whig	42	P	14.2
John Sergeant	PA	1832	National Republican	49	VP	17.1
Arthur Sewall	ME	1896	Democratic	149	VP	33.3
Horatio Seymour	NY	1868	Democratic	80	P	27.2
James S. Sherman	NY	1908	Republican	321	VP	66.5
Sargent Shriver	MD	1972	Democratic	17	VP	3.2
Al Smith	NY	1928	Democratic	87	P	16.4
William Smith	SC	1828	Democratic	7	VP	2.7
William Smith	AL	1836	Democratic	23	VP	7.8
John Sparkman	AL	1952	Democratic	89	VP	16.8
Faith Spotted Eagle	SD	2016	Democratic	1	P	0.2
Adlai Stevenson II	IL	1952	Democratic	89	P	16.8
Adlai Stevenson II	IL	1956	Democratic	73	P	13.7
Adlai Stevenson I	IL	1892	Democratic	277	VP	62.4
Adlai Stevenson I	IL	1900	Democratic	155	VP	34.7
Richard Stockton	NJ	1820	Federalist	8	VP	3.4
William Howard Taft	OH	1908	Republican	321	P	66.5
William Howard Taft	OH	1912	Republican	8	P	1.5
Herman Talmadge	GA	1956	Democratic	1	VP	0.2
Zachary Taylor	LA	1848	Whig	163	P	56.2
Littleton Waller Tazewell	VA	1840	Democratic	11	VP	3.7
Edward Telfair	GA	1789	Anti-Federalist	1	–	0.7
Allen G. Thurman	OH	1888	Democratic	168	VP	41.9
Strom Thurmond	SC	1948	States' Rights Democratic	39	P	7.3
Strom Thurmond	SC	1960	Democratic	14	VP	2.6
Samuel J. Tilden	NY	1876	Democratic	184	P	49.9
Daniel D. Tompkins	NY	1816	Democratic-Republican	183	VP	84.3
Daniel D. Tompkins	NY	1820	Democratic-Republican	218	VP	94.0
Harry S. Truman	MO	1944	Democratic	432	VP	81.4
Harry S. Truman	MO	1948	Democratic	303	P	57.1
Donald Trump	NY	2016	Republican	304	P	56.5
Donald Trump	FL	2020	Republican	232	P	43.1
Donald Trump	FL	2024	Republican	312	P	58.0
John Tyler	VA	1836	Whig	47	VP	16.0
John Tyler	VA	1840	Whig	234	VP	79.6
Martin Van Buren	NY	1824	Democratic-Republican	9	VP	3.5
Martin Van Buren	NY	1832	Democratic	189	VP	66.1
Martin Van Buren	NY	1836	Democratic	170	P	57.8
Martin Van Buren	NY	1840	Democratic	60	P	20.4
JD Vance	OH	2024	Republican	312	VP	58.0
George Wallace	AL	1968	American Independent	46	P	8.6
Henry A. Wallace	IA	1940	Democratic	449	VP	84.6
Tim Walz	MN	2024	Democratic	226	VP	42.0
Earl Warren	CA	1948	Republican	189	VP	35.6
Elizabeth Warren	MA	2016	Democratic	2	VP	0.4
George Washington	VA	1789	Independent	69	–	50.0
George Washington	VA	1792	Independent	132	–	50.0
George Washington	VA	1796	Independent	2	–	0.7
Thomas E. Watson	GA	1896	Populist	27	VP	6.0
James B. Weaver	IA	1892	Populist	22	P	5.0
Daniel Webster	MA	1836	Whig	14	P	4.8
Burton K. Wheeler	MT	1924	Progressive (1924)	13	VP	2.4
William A. Wheeler	NY	1876	Republican	185	VP	50.1
Hugh Lawson White	TN	1836	Whig	26	P	8.8
William Wilkins	PA	1832	Democratic	30	VP	10.5
Wendell Willkie	NY	1940	Republican	82	P	15.4
Henry Wilson	MA	1872	Republican	286	VP	81.3
Woodrow Wilson	NJ	1912	Democratic	435	P	81.9
Woodrow Wilson	NJ	1916	Democratic	277	P	52.2
William Wirt	MD	1832	Anti-Masonic	7	P	2.4
Fielding L. Wright	MS	1948	States' Rights Democratic	39	VP	7.3

== See also ==
- List of United States presidential candidates by number of votes received
