= Andrew Ege =

American politician

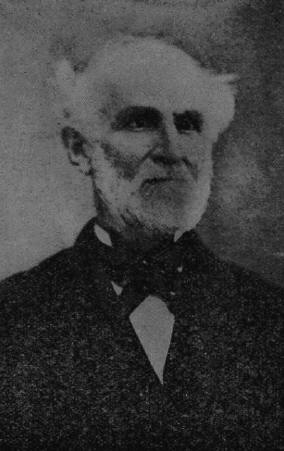

Member of the Maryland House of Delegates from Carroll County
- In office 1845–1846 Serving with Thomas Hook, James M. Shellman, Abraham Wampler, Charles Devilbiss, and Upton Scott

Personal details
- Born: Andrew Gailbraith Ege; January 6, 1812 Boiling Springs, Pennsylvania, U.S.
- Died: November 24, 1876 (aged 64) Troy, Kansas
- Party: Whig
- Spouse(s): Margaret Ann McKaleb (m. 1834; died 1851) Matilda Hester Craighead (m. 1854)
- Children: 5
- Education: Mount St. Mary's University

Military service
- Allegiance: United States of America
- Branch/service: United States Army
- Years of service: 1846–1848
- Rank: Colonel
- Battles/wars: Mexican–American War

Andrew Gailbraith Ege (January 6, 1812 – November 24, 1876) was an American lawyer, farmer, and politician. He was a member of the Maryland House of Delegates representing Carroll County from 1845 to 1846. He is also known for the construction of the Antrim 1844 in Taneytown, Maryland.

== Personal life ==
Ege was born in Boiling Springs, Pennsylvania, on January 6, 1812. He attended the Academy of Dr. McGraw and Mount St. Mary's University in Emmitsburg, Maryland. After his father's death in 1827, he and his brother inherited Carlisle Ironworks, operator of the Pine Grove Iron Works, in Boiling Springs. In 1834, he married Margaret Ann McKaleb in Frederick County, Maryland, returning to Carlisle, Pennsylvania, and becoming active in Whig Party politics. From 1845 to 1846, Ege represented Carroll County in the Maryland House of Delegates, representing the Whig Party alongside Colonels Thomas Hook and James Shellman. Afterwards, Ege fought as a soldier and officer in the Mexican–American War, earning the rank of colonel. In 1850, Ege participated in the Maryland Constitutional Convention, representing Carroll County.

Following Margaret's death in 1851, Ege remarried and moved his family west to Kansas. He quickly entered into a partnership in the real estate business with Brigadier-General M. Jeff Thompson, eventually becoming the owner of over eight thousand acres of land and other properties in Kansas. He eventually settled down in Troy, Kansas, where he lived until his death on November 24, 1876. He was 64 years old.

=== Antrim 1844 ===
Following the death of Margaret's only brother in 1841 and her father in January 1843, she and Ege inherited the family's 420-acre estate in Taneytown, Maryland. Once the couple were settled in Taneytown, they began construction of a manor on the property, involving Baltimore builder Benjamin Forrester, William Henry Rinehart, and slave labor. On the lands, Ege operated a large slave plantation, raising 14 horses, 12 milk cows, and 18 other cattle, which produced 1,000 pounds of butter. He also produced 900 bushes of wheat, rye, corn, oats, potatoes, and hay on the acreage.

After Ege went bankrupt, a local farmer bought the estate, whose descendants expanded the land holdings and continued operating it as a farm until the 1940s. The property transitioned into a bed and breakfast after it was purchased in 1988.
