= Dave Leip's Atlas of U.S. Presidential Elections =

American political statistics website

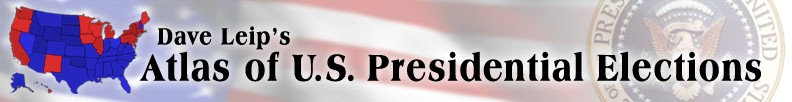
- Available in: English
- Creator: David Leip
- Website: uselectionatlas.org
- Commercial: No
- Registration: Optional
- Current status: active

Dave Leip's Atlas of U.S. Presidential Elections is a website that provides tables, infographs, and maps for presidential (1789–present), senatorial (1990 and onwards), and gubernatorial (1990 and onwards) elections. Data include candidates, political parties, popular and electoral vote totals, and voter turnout. U.S. county-level data is available for many years, and all data are compiled from official sources. The website has been positively received, and has been used as an authoritative reference by numerous publications.

== History ==
The website was created in 1993 by electrical engineer David Leip from Massachusetts. Leip began the Atlas of U.S. Presidential Elections as a hobby after the 1992 U.S. presidential election while he was attending graduate school at MIT. It provides data and maps for presidential, congressional, and gubernatorial elections. Despite the general media coloring Democrats as blue and Republicans as red (blue and red states), the Atlas website follows international conventions and uses blue for the more right-leaning Republicans and red for the more left-leaning Democrats. This is because the website predates the conventional color scheme, which has only been in place since the 2000 U.S. presidential election. It also sells election data sets.

The website was significantly amended in 1997, beginning with data from the 1996 U.S. presidential election, acquiring information from the secretary of state offices, which published election data online from 1996 onwards. The website was originally hosted by MIT but moved to its own URL (uselectionatlas.org) in 1998. A part of the website is the Atlas Forum, a debate and discussion chamber on U.S. and international elections and politics, as well as electoral mapmaking. In March 2020, the forum was renamed "Talk Elections" with a user and moderator going by the name Virginia becoming the forum administrator.

== Reception ==
PolitiFact has referred the website as "indispensable", while The Washington Post has described it as "great-if-not-super-modern", and observed that "perhaps more interestingly, it lets us figure out which voters actually mattered — that is, the votes cast before and after a candidate clinched the nomination." Leip's Atlas has been cited as a "preferred source for election results" by statistician and political pundit Nate Silver. The website has been cited or used a reference for U.S. election and political data by major media outlets including The Atlantic, CBS News, Men's Health, Politico, Roll Call, U.S. News & World Report, and The Wall Street Journal.
