= 1928 United States presidential election in Mississippi =

- November 6, 1928

Nominee	Al Smith	Herbert Hoover
Party	Democratic	Republican
Home state	New York	California
Running mate	Joseph T. Robinson	Charles Curtis
Electoral vote	10	0
Popular vote	124,539	27,153
Percentage	82.10%	17.90%
County results
Smith
50–60%
60–70%
70–80%
80–90%
90–100%
Hoover
50–60%
60–70%
President before election
Calvin Coolidge
Republican
Elected President
Herbert Hoover
Republican

The 1928 United States presidential election in Mississippi took place on November 6, 1928, as part of the wider United States presidential election. Voters chose 10 representatives, or electors, to the Electoral College, who voted for president and vice president.

Mississippi voted for the Democratic nominee, Governor Alfred E. Smith of New York, over the Republican nominee, former Secretary of Commerce Herbert Hoover of California. Smith ran with Senator Joseph Taylor Robinson of Arkansas, while Hoover's running mate was Senate Majority Leader Charles Curtis of Kansas.

This was the first election since 1888 that a Republican won any county in Mississippi, and the first time since 1892 that a Democrat would lose any county in the state. Pearl River, Stone County, George County voted Republican for the first time since their creation.

Smith was a Roman Catholic, a poor fit for the overwhelmingly Protestant Southern states. Despite this, it was widely believed that Republican Herbert Hoover supported integration or at least was not committed to maintaining racial segregation, overcoming opposition to Smith's campaign in the Deep South.

Smith won Mississippi by a margin of 64.20%. It was his second strongest state, after South Carolina.

== Results ==
1928 United States presidential election in Mississippi
Party	Candidate	Votes	%
Democratic	Alfred E. Smith	124,539	82.10%
Republican	Herbert Hoover	27,153	17.90%
Total votes		151,692	100%
