= Cleveland vs. Harrison =

Cleveland vs. Harrison may refer to one of two United States presidential elections between Grover Cleveland and Benjamin Harrison:

- 1888 United States presidential election, won by Benjamin Harrison against Grover Cleveland
- 1892 United States presidential election, won by Grover Cleveland against Benjamin Harrison
