= 1888 United States presidential election in Iowa =

- November 6, 1888
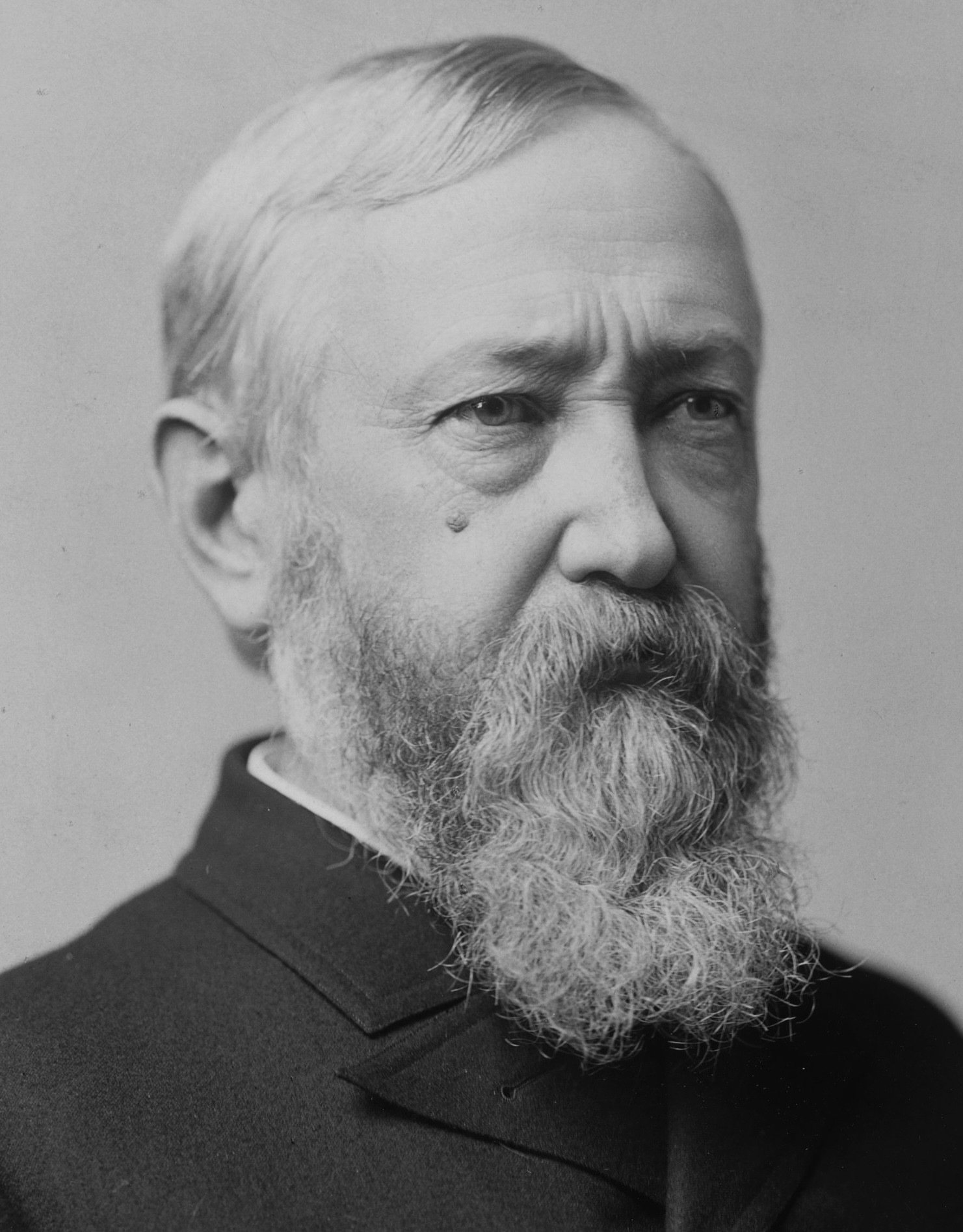

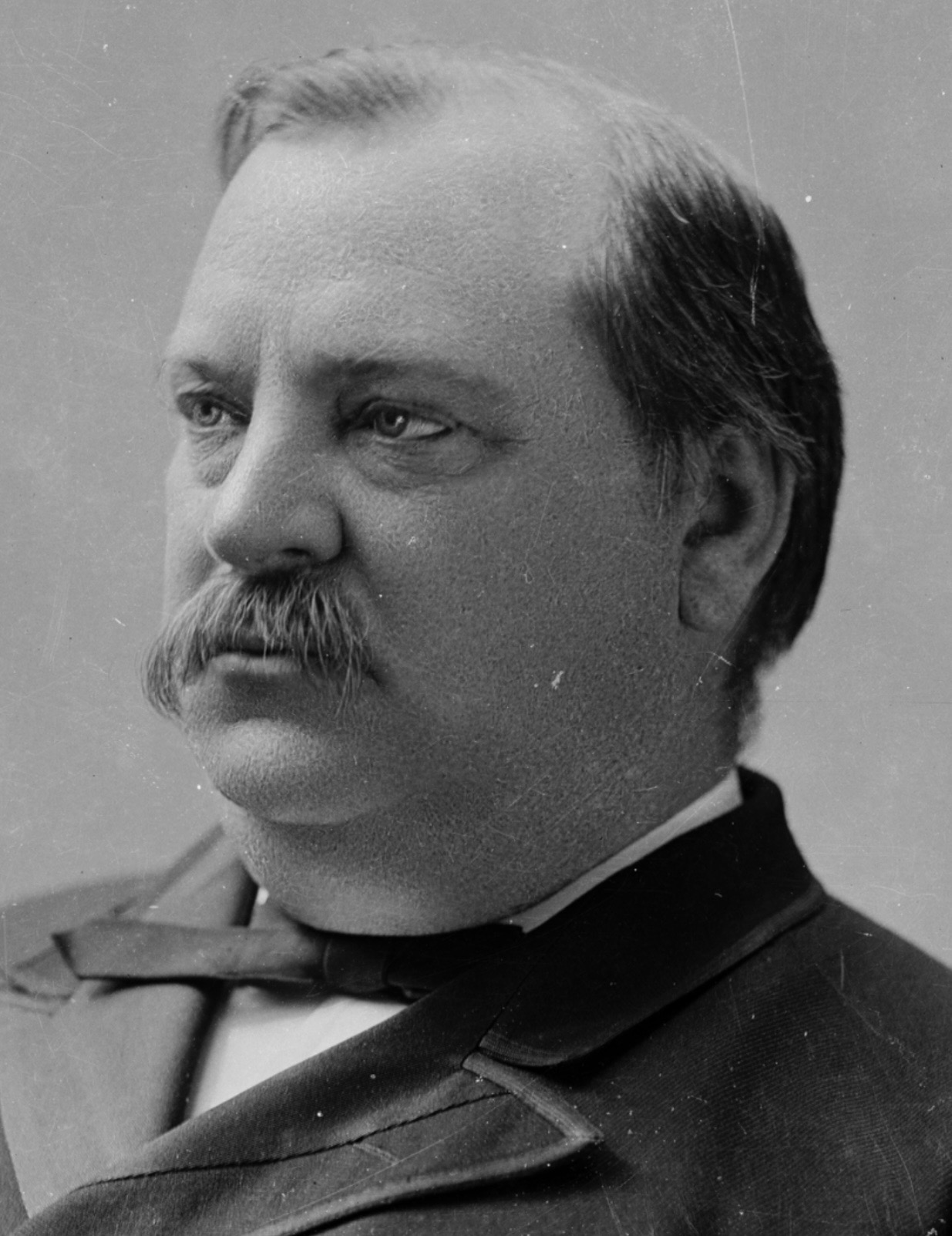
| Nominee | Benjamin Harrison | Grover Cleveland |
| Party | Republican | Democratic |
| Home state | Indiana | New York |
| Running mate | Levi P. Morton | Allen G. Thurman |
| Electoral vote | 13 | 0 |
| Popular vote | 211,603 | 179,877 |
| Percentage | 52.36% | 44.51% |
County results
Harrison
40–50%
50–60%
60–70%
70–80%
Cleveland
40–50%
50–60%
60–70%
President before election
Grover Cleveland
Democratic
Elected President
Benjamin Harrison
Republican

The 1888 United States presidential election in Iowa took place on November 6, 1888, as part of the 1888 United States presidential election. Voters chose 13 representatives, or electors to the Electoral College, who voted for president and vice president.

Iowa voted for the Republican nominee, Benjamin Harrison, over the Democratic nominee, incumbent President Grover Cleveland. Harrison won the state by a margin of 7.85%.

== Results ==
1888 United States presidential election in Iowa
| Party | Candidate | Running mate | Popular vote | | Electoral vote | |
| Party | Candidate | Running mate | Count | % | Count | % |
|---|---|---|---|---|---|---|
| Republican | Benjamin Harrison of Indiana | Levi Parsons Morton of New York | 211,603 | 52.36% | 13 | 100.00% |
| Democratic | Grover Cleveland of New York (incumbent) | Allen Granberry Thurman of Ohio | 179,877 | 44.51% | 0 | 0.00% |
| Union Labor | Alson Jenness Streetcar of Illinois | Charles E. Cunningham of Arkansas | 9,105 | 2.25% | 0 | 0.00% |
| Prohibition | Clinton Bowen Fisk of New Jersey | John Anderson Brooks of Missouri | 3,550 | 0.88% | 0 | 0.00% |
| Total | | | 404,135 | 100.00% | 13 | 100.00% |

=== Results by county ===
| County | Benjamin Harrison Republican | | Stephen Grover Cleveland Democratic | | Alson Jenness Streeter Union Labor | | Clinton Bowen Fisk Prohibition | | Various candidates Write-ins | | Margin | | Total votes cast |
| County | # | % | # | % | # | % | # | % | # | % | # | % | Total votes cast |
|---|---|---|---|---|---|---|---|---|---|---|---|---|---|
| Adair | 1,883 | 59.25% | 1,178 | 37.07% | 108 | 3.40% | 9 | 0.28% | | | 705 | 22.18% | 3,178 |
| Adams | 1,387 | 51.41% | 1,146 | 42.48% | 112 | 4.15% | 53 | 1.96% | | | 241 | 8.93% | 2,698 |
| Allamakee | 1,903 | 47.93% | 2,023 | 50.96% | 43 | 1.08% | 1 | 0.03% | | | -120 | -3.02% | 3,970 |
| Appanoose | 2,103 | 52.02% | 1,837 | 45.44% | 44 | 1.09% | 59 | 1.46% | | | 266 | 6.58% | 4,043 |
| Audubon | 1,366 | 51.35% | 1,210 | 45.49% | 67 | 2.52% | 17 | 0.64% | | | 156 | 5.86% | 2,660 |
| Benton | 2,768 | 50.46% | 2,646 | 48.24% | 39 | 0.71% | 32 | 0.58% | | | 122 | 2.22% | 5,485 |
| Black Hawk | 3,106 | 58.50% | 2,127 | 40.06% | 56 | 1.05% | 18 | 0.34% | 2 | 0.04% | 979 | 18.44% | 5,309 |
| Boone | 2,768 | 58.45% | 1,847 | 39.00% | 105 | 2.22% | 16 | 0.34% | | | 921 | 19.45% | 4,736 |
| Bremer | 1,613 | 47.43% | 1,728 | 50.81% | 39 | 1.15% | 21 | 0.62% | | | -115 | -3.38% | 3,401 |
| Buchanan | 2,343 | 54.37% | 1,880 | 43.63% | 52 | 1.21% | 34 | 0.79% | | | 463 | 10.74% | 4,309 |
| Buena Vista | 1,693 | 65.04% | 857 | 32.92% | 26 | 1.00% | 27 | 1.04% | | | 836 | 32.12% | 2,603 |
| Butler | 2,038 | 62.38% | 1,204 | 36.85% | 10 | 0.31% | 15 | 0.46% | | | 834 | 25.53% | 3,267 |
| Calhoun | 1,729 | 66.78% | 828 | 31.98% | 10 | 0.39% | 22 | 0.85% | | | 901 | 34.80% | 2,589 |
| Carroll | 1,593 | 42.79% | 2,052 | 55.12% | 64 | 1.72% | 14 | 0.38% | | | -459 | -12.33% | 3,723 |
| Cass | 2,372 | 53.88% | 1,722 | 39.12% | 221 | 5.02% | 15 | 0.34% | 72 | 1.64% | 650 | 14.77% | 4,402 |
| Cedar | 2,137 | 49.12% | 2,134 | 49.05% | 11 | 0.25% | 68 | 1.56% | 1 | 0.02% | 3 | 0.07% | 4,351 |
| Cerro Gordo | 1,866 | 63.30% | 1,004 | 34.06% | 7 | 0.24% | 71 | 2.41% | | | 862 | 29.24% | 2,948 |
| Cherokee | 1,960 | 60.14% | 1,162 | 35.66% | 75 | 2.30% | 62 | 1.90% | | | 798 | 24.49% | 3,259 |
| Chickasaw | 1,561 | 48.33% | 1,604 | 49.66% | 55 | 1.70% | 10 | 0.31% | | | -43 | -1.33% | 3,230 |
| Clarke | 1,395 | 56.14% | 910 | 36.62% | 157 | 6.32% | 23 | 0.93% | | | 485 | 19.52% | 2,485 |
| Clay | 1,438 | 73.07% | 494 | 25.10% | 2 | 0.10% | 34 | 1.73% | | | 944 | 47.97% | 1,968 |
| Clayton | 2,576 | 43.19% | 3,311 | 55.52% | 42 | 0.70% | 35 | 0.59% | | | -735 | -12.32% | 5,964 |
| Clinton | 3,599 | 40.80% | 5,106 | 57.89% | 58 | 0.66% | 31 | 0.35% | 26 | 0.29% | -1,507 | -17.09% | 8,820 |
| Crawford | 1,658 | 43.63% | 2,123 | 55.87% | 6 | 0.16% | 13 | 0.34% | | | -465 | -12.24% | 3,800 |
| Dallas | 2,538 | 57.12% | 1,579 | 35.54% | 249 | 5.60% | 77 | 1.73% | | | 959 | 21.58% | 4,443 |
| Davis | 1,428 | 41.56% | 1,626 | 47.32% | 334 | 9.72% | 48 | 1.40% | | | -198 | -5.76% | 3,436 |
| Decatur | 1,753 | 50.36% | 1,497 | 43.00% | 165 | 4.74% | 66 | 1.90% | | | 256 | 7.35% | 3,481 |
| Delaware | 2,247 | 58.08% | 1,570 | 40.58% | 14 | 0.36% | 36 | 0.93% | 2 | 0.05% | 677 | 17.50% | 3,869 |
| Des Moines | 3,368 | 43.65% | 4,291 | 55.61% | 23 | 0.30% | 34 | 0.44% | | | -923 | -11.96% | 7,716 |
| Dickinson | 672 | 74.17% | 225 | 24.83% | 1 | 0.11% | 8 | 0.88% | | | 447 | 49.34% | 906 |
| Dubuque | 3,060 | 31.09% | 5,948 | 60.43% | 385 | 3.91% | 58 | 0.59% | 392 | 3.98% | -2,888 | -29.34% | 9,843 |
| Emmet | 573 | 71.71% | 206 | 25.78% | 14 | 1.75% | 6 | 0.75% | | | 367 | 45.93% | 799 |
| Fayette | 2,781 | 52.38% | 2,182 | 41.10% | 287 | 5.41% | 59 | 1.11% | | | 599 | 11.28% | 5,309 |
| Floyd | 1,982 | 58.95% | 1,288 | 38.31% | 68 | 2.02% | 24 | 0.71% | | | 694 | 20.64% | 3,362 |
| Franklin | 1,609 | 65.19% | 848 | 34.36% | 0 | 0.00% | 11 | 0.45% | | | 761 | 30.83% | 2,468 |
| Fremont | 1,851 | 48.20% | 1,866 | 48.59% | 84 | 2.19% | 39 | 1.02% | | | -15 | -0.39% | 3,840 |
| Greene | 2,113 | 60.20% | 1,300 | 37.04% | 52 | 1.48% | 45 | 1.28% | | | 813 | 23.16% | 3,510 |
| Grundy | 1,372 | 54.12% | 1,132 | 44.65% | 4 | 0.16% | 27 | 1.07% | | | 240 | 9.47% | 2,535 |
| Guthrie | 2,218 | 58.34% | 1,405 | 36.95% | 147 | 3.87% | 32 | 0.84% | | | 813 | 21.38% | 3,802 |
| Hamilton | 1,778 | 63.34% | 1,007 | 35.87% | 17 | 0.61% | 5 | 0.18% | | | 771 | 27.47% | 2,807 |
| Hancock | 892 | 59.55% | 561 | 37.45% | 0 | 0.00% | 14 | 0.93% | 31 | 2.07% | 331 | 22.10% | 1,498 |
| Hardin | 2,522 | 65.12% | 1,287 | 33.23% | 18 | 0.46% | 46 | 1.19% | | | 1,235 | 31.89% | 3,873 |
| Harrison | 2,381 | 48.41% | 2,247 | 45.69% | 220 | 4.47% | 70 | 1.42% | | | 134 | 2.72% | 4,918 |
| Henry | 2,485 | 57.48% | 1,729 | 40.00% | 46 | 1.06% | 63 | 1.46% | | | 756 | 17.49% | 4,323 |
| Howard | 1,233 | 54.37% | 1,012 | 44.62% | 10 | 0.44% | 13 | 0.57% | | | 221 | 9.74% | 2,268 |
| Humboldt | 1,237 | 64.60% | 641 | 33.47% | 3 | 0.16% | 34 | 1.78% | | | 596 | 31.12% | 1,915 |
| Ida | 1,269 | 53.32% | 1,087 | 45.67% | 12 | 0.50% | 12 | 0.50% | | | 182 | 7.65% | 2,380 |
| Iowa | 1,664 | 44.86% | 1,978 | 53.33% | 50 | 1.35% | 17 | 0.46% | | | -314 | -8.47% | 3,709 |
| Jackson | 2,029 | 39.54% | 3,029 | 59.02% | 42 | 0.82% | 32 | 0.62% | | | -1,000 | -19.49% | 5,132 |
| Jasper | 3,137 | 53.16% | 2,341 | 39.67% | 354 | 6.00% | 69 | 1.17% | | | 796 | 13.49% | 5,901 |
| Jefferson | 2,046 | 54.97% | 1,588 | 42.67% | 29 | 0.78% | 59 | 1.59% | | | 458 | 12.31% | 3,722 |
| Johnson | 2,051 | 40.15% | 3,038 | 59.48% | 10 | 0.20% | 9 | 0.18% | | | -987 | -19.32% | 5,108 |
| Jones | 2,428 | 52.05% | 2,187 | 46.88% | 13 | 0.28% | 37 | 0.79% | | | 241 | 5.17% | 4,665 |
| Keokuk | 2,690 | 49.36% | 2,635 | 48.35% | 80 | 1.47% | 45 | 0.83% | | | 55 | 1.01% | 5,450 |
| Kossuth | 1,451 | 57.58% | 1,026 | 40.71% | 36 | 1.43% | 6 | 0.24% | 1 | 0.04% | 425 | 16.87% | 2,520 |
| Lee | 3,820 | 44.44% | 4,650 | 54.10% | 99 | 1.15% | 26 | 0.30% | | | -830 | -9.66% | 8,595 |
| Linn | 5,247 | 53.19% | 4,373 | 44.33% | 79 | 0.80% | 165 | 1.67% | | | 874 | 8.86% | 9,864 |
| Louisa | 1,836 | 62.26% | 1,012 | 34.32% | 68 | 2.31% | 33 | 1.12% | | | 824 | 27.94% | 2,949 |
| Lucas | 1,891 | 58.62% | 1,225 | 37.97% | 94 | 2.91% | 16 | 0.50% | | | 666 | 20.64% | 3,226 |
| Lyon | 952 | 58.26% | 676 | 41.37% | 0 | 0.00% | 6 | 0.37% | | | 276 | 16.89% | 1,634 |
| Madison | 1,870 | 51.77% | 1,346 | 37.26% | 373 | 10.33% | 23 | 0.64% | | | 524 | 14.51% | 3,612 |
| Mahaska | 3,700 | 55.17% | 2,703 | 40.30% | 208 | 3.10% | 96 | 1.43% | | | 997 | 14.87% | 6,707 |
| Marion | 2,374 | 47.30% | 2,322 | 46.26% | 295 | 5.88% | 28 | 0.56% | | | 52 | 1.04% | 5,019 |
| Marshall | 3,365 | 61.77% | 1,933 | 35.48% | 103 | 1.89% | 47 | 0.86% | | | 1,432 | 26.28% | 5,448 |
| Mills | 1,625 | 50.61% | 1,461 | 45.50% | 101 | 3.15% | 24 | 0.75% | | | 164 | 5.11% | 3,211 |
| Mitchell | 1,683 | 61.02% | 1,028 | 37.27% | 15 | 0.54% | 31 | 1.12% | 1 | 0.04% | 655 | 23.75% | 2,758 |
| Monona | 1,590 | 53.21% | 1,088 | 36.41% | 286 | 9.57% | 24 | 0.80% | | | 1,304 | 43.64% | 2,988 |
| Monroe | 1,442 | 50.21% | 1,233 | 42.93% | 175 | 6.09% | 16 | 0.56% | 6 | 0.21% | 209 | 7.28% | 2,872 |
| Montgomery | 2,260 | 63.84% | 1,228 | 34.69% | 24 | 0.68% | 28 | 0.79% | | | 1,032 | 29.15% | 3,540 |
| Muscatine | 2,654 | 48.27% | 2,767 | 50.33% | 54 | 0.98% | 21 | 0.38% | 2 | 0.04% | -113 | -2.06% | 5,498 |
| O'Brien | 1,671 | 60.17% | 1,085 | 39.07% | 2 | 0.07% | 4 | 0.14% | 15 | 0.54% | 586 | 21.10% | 2,777 |
| Osceola | 695 | 65.88% | 354 | 33.55% | 4 | 0.38% | 2 | 0.19% | | | 341 | 32.32% | 1,055 |
| Page | 2,571 | 58.14% | 1,468 | 33.20% | 183 | 4.14% | 200 | 4.52% | | | 1,103 | 24.94% | 4,422 |
| Palo Alto | 840 | 47.67% | 850 | 48.24% | 64 | 3.63% | 8 | 0.45% | | | -10 | -0.57% | 1,762 |
| Plymouth | 1,755 | 43.72% | 2,140 | 53.31% | 61 | 1.52% | 58 | 1.44% | | | -385 | -9.59% | 4,014 |
| Pocahontas | 999 | 55.72% | 746 | 41.61% | 1 | 0.06% | 40 | 2.23% | 7 | 0.39% | 253 | 14.11% | 1,793 |
| Polk | 7,049 | 57.48% | 4,966 | 40.50% | 142 | 1.16% | 106 | 0.86% | | | 2,083 | 16.99% | 12,263 |
| Pottawattamie | 4,591 | 47.81% | 4,881 | 50.83% | 90 | 0.94% | 41 | 0.43% | | | -290 | -3.02% | 9,603 |
| Poweshiek | 2,347 | 54.24% | 1,779 | 41.11% | 167 | 3.86% | 34 | 0.79% | | | 568 | 13.13% | 4,327 |
| Ringgold | 1,766 | 59.86% | 1,040 | 35.25% | 62 | 2.10% | 82 | 2.78% | | | 726 | 24.61% | 2,950 |
| Sac | 1,832 | 61.15% | 1,102 | 36.78% | 7 | 0.23% | 55 | 1.84% | | | 730 | 24.37% | 2,996 |
| Scott | 2,832 | 32.82% | 5,692 | 65.97% | 53 | 0.61% | 51 | 0.59% | | | -2,860 | -33.15% | 8,628 |
| Shelby | 1,714 | 47.17% | 1,762 | 48.49% | 150 | 4.13% | 8 | 0.22% | | | -48 | -1.32% | 3,634 |
| Sioux | 1,905 | 56.87% | 1,408 | 42.03% | 11 | 0.33% | 15 | 0.45% | 11 | 0.33% | 497 | 14.84% | 3,350 |
| Story | 2,420 | 67.13% | 1,050 | 29.13% | 98 | 2.72% | 37 | 1.03% | | | 1,370 | 38.00% | 3,605 |
| Tama | 2,305 | 48.77% | 2,294 | 48.54% | 98 | 2.07% | 29 | 0.61% | | | 11 | 0.23% | 4,726 |
| Taylor | 2,015 | 56.03% | 1,322 | 36.76% | 230 | 6.40% | 29 | 0.81% | | | 693 | 19.27% | 3,596 |
| Union | 1,833 | 49.13% | 1,414 | 37.90% | 460 | 12.33% | 24 | 0.64% | | | 419 | 11.23% | 3,731 |
| Van Buren | 2,028 | 52.04% | 1,775 | 45.55% | 20 | 0.51% | 72 | 1.85% | 2 | 0.05% | 253 | 6.49% | 3,897 |
| Wapello | 3,282 | 48.77% | 3,101 | 46.08% | 344 | 5.11% | 3 | 0.04% | | | 181 | 2.69% | 6,730 |
| Warren | 2,289 | 55.97% | 1,523 | 37.24% | 215 | 5.26% | 63 | 1.54% | | | 766 | 18.73% | 4,090 |
| Washington | 2,345 | 52.89% | 1,980 | 44.65% | 76 | 1.71% | 33 | 0.74% | | | 365 | 8.23% | 4,434 |
| Wayne | 1,781 | 51.76% | 1,570 | 45.63% | 61 | 1.77% | 29 | 0.84% | | | 211 | 6.13% | 3,441 |
| Webster | 2,353 | 53.36% | 1,809 | 41.02% | 239 | 5.42% | 9 | 0.20% | | | 544 | 12.34% | 4,410 |
| Winnebago | 894 | 78.77% | 218 | 19.21% | 3 | 0.26% | 20 | 1.76% | | | 676 | 59.56% | 1,135 |
| Winneshiek | 2,559 | 55.02% | 2,043 | 43.93% | 19 | 0.41% | 30 | 0.65% | | | 516 | 11.09% | 4,651 |
| Woodbury | 4,169 | 52.87% | 3,588 | 45.50% | 87 | 1.10% | 42 | 0.53% | | | 581 | 7.37% | 7,886 |
| Worth | 1,063 | 65.06% | 542 | 33.17% | 7 | 0.43% | 22 | 1.35% | | | 521 | 31.88% | 1,634 |
| Wright | 1,677 | 66.34% | 831 | 32.87% | 1 | 0.04% | 19 | 0.75% | | | 846 | 33.47% | 2,528 |
| Totals | 211,602 | 52.29% | 179,867 | 44.45% | 9,105 | 2.25% | 3,550 | 0.88% | 571 | 0.14% | 31,735 | 7.84% | 404,695 |

== See also ==
- United States presidential elections in Iowa
