= 1888 United States presidential election in Mississippi =

- November 6, 1888
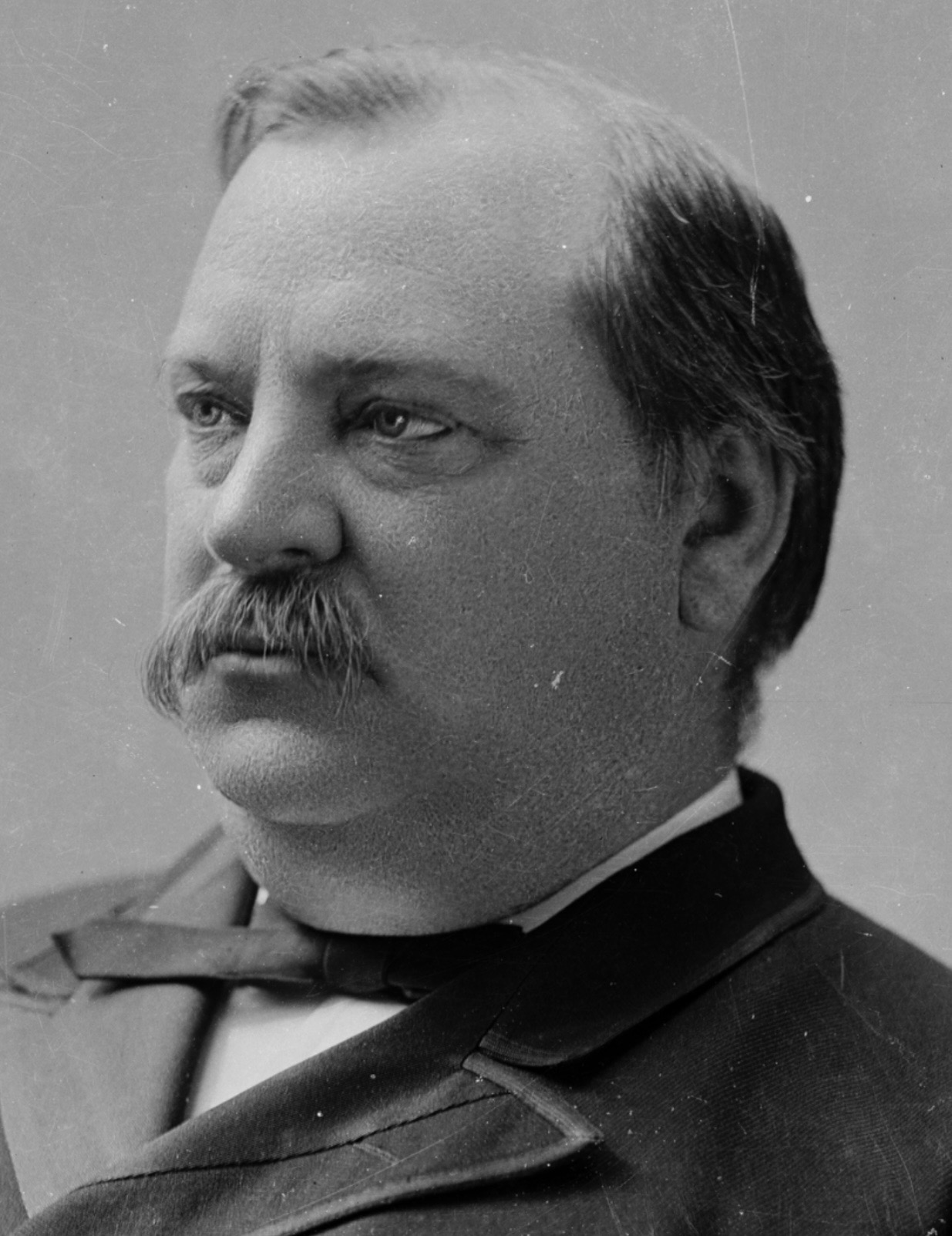

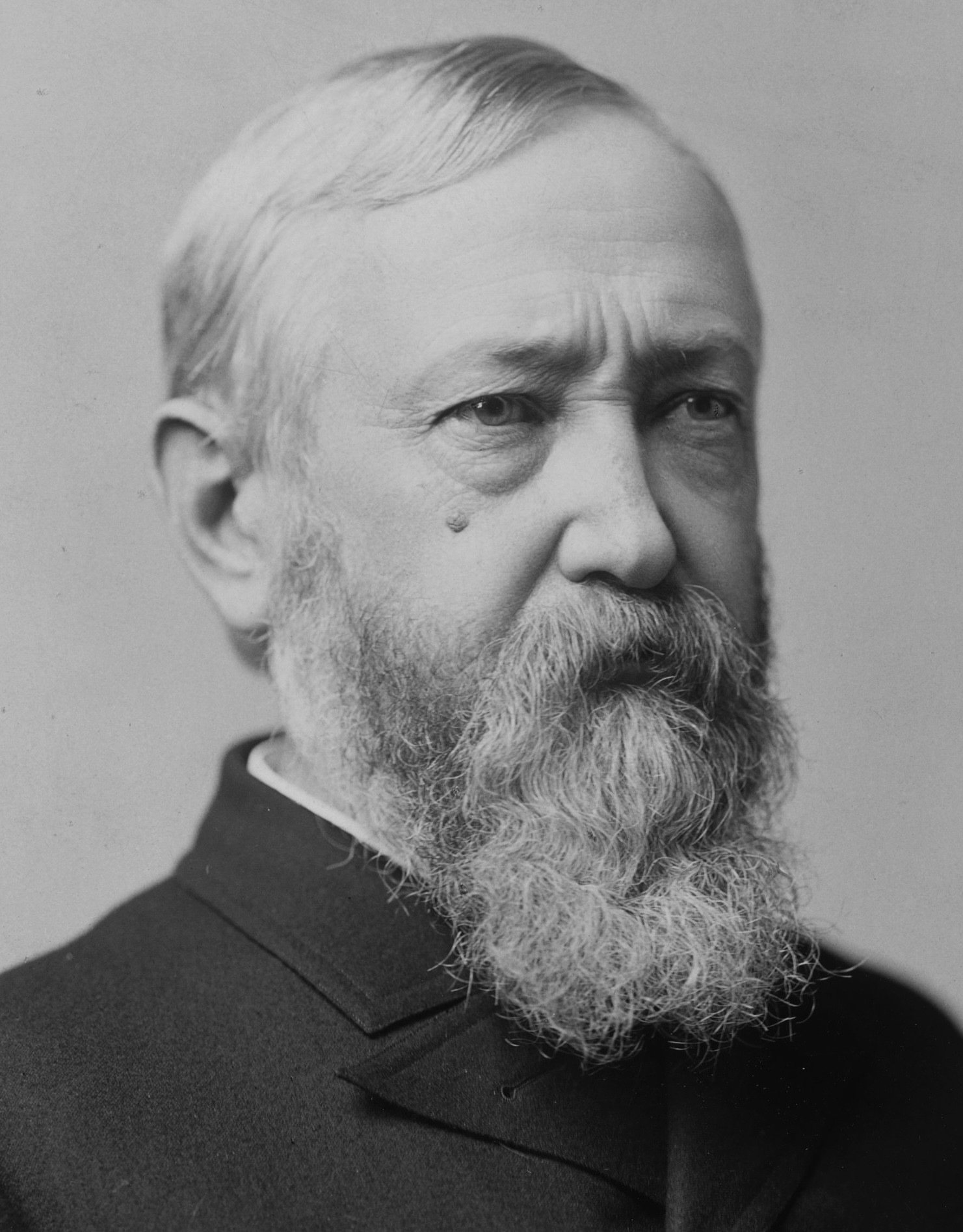
Nominee	Grover Cleveland	Benjamin Harrison
Party	Democratic	Republican
Home state	New York	Indiana
Running mate	Allen G. Thurman	Levi P. Morton
Electoral vote	9	0
Popular vote	85,451	30,095
Percentage	73.80%	25.99%
County results
Cleveland
50–60%
60–70%
70–80%
80–90%
90–100%
Harrison
50–60%
60–70%
70–80%
President before election
Grover Cleveland
Democratic
Elected President
Benjamin Harrison
Republican

The 1888 United States presidential election in Mississippi took place on November 6, 1888, as part of the 1888 United States presidential election. Voters chose nine representatives, or electors, to the Electoral College, who voted for president and vice president.

Mississippi voted for the Democratic nominee, incumbent President Grover Cleveland, over the Republican nominee, Benjamin Harrison. Cleveland won the state by a margin of 47.81%.

== Results ==
1888 United States presidential election in Mississippi
Party	Candidate	Running mate	Popular vote		Electoral vote	
Party	Candidate	Running mate	Count	%	Count	%
Democratic	Grover Cleveland of New York (incumbent)	Allen Granberry Thurman of Ohio	85,451	73.80%	9	100.00%
Republican	Benjamin Harrison of Indiana	Levi Parsons Morton of New York	30,095	25.99%	0	0.00%
Prohibition	Clinton Bowen Fisk of New Jersey	John Anderson Brooks of Missouri	240	0.21%	0	0.00%
Total			115,786	100.00%	9	100.00%

=== Results by county ===
County	Stephen Grover Cleveland Democratic		Benjamin Harrison Republican		Clinton Bowen Fisk Prohibition		Margin		Total votes cast
County	#	%	#	%	#	%	#	%	Total votes cast
Adams	793	28.59%	1,981	71.41%	0	0.00%	-1,188	-42.83%	2,774
Alcorn	1,094	70.85%	447	28.95%	3	0.19%	647	41.90%	1,544
Amite	1,399	78.73%	375	21.10%	3	0.17%	1,024	57.63%	1,777
Attala	1,924	67.49%	927	32.51%	0	0.00%	997	34.97%	2,851
Benton	814	62.91%	479	37.02%	1	0.08%	335	25.89%	1,294
Bolivar	907	34.45%	1,726	65.55%	0	0.00%	-819	-31.11%	2,633
Calhoun	1,163	91.14%	108	8.46%	5	0.39%	1,055	82.68%	1,276
Carroll	1,052	94.27%	60	5.38%	4	0.36%	992	88.89%	1,116
Chickasaw	1,264	74.44%	432	25.44%	2	0.12%	832	49.00%	1,698
Choctaw	743	99.60%	3	0.40%	0	0.00%	740	99.20%	746
Claiborne	599	97.72%	14	2.28%	0	0.00%	585	95.43%	613
Clarke	1,510	74.83%	496	24.58%	12	0.59%	1,014	50.25%	2,018
Clay	1,508	86.57%	234	13.43%	0	0.00%	1,274	73.13%	1,742
Coahoma	612	27.78%	1,591	72.22%	0	0.00%	-979	-44.44%	2,203
Copiah	2,207	82.72%	461	17.28%	0	0.00%	1,746	65.44%	2,668
Covington	638	99.38%	4	0.62%	0	0.00%	634	98.75%	642
De Soto	2,083	68.45%	960	31.55%	0	0.00%	1,123	36.90%	3,043
Franklin	776	78.54%	203	20.55%	9	0.91%	573	58.00%	988
Greene	381	85.81%	63	14.19%	0	0.00%	318	71.62%	444
Grenada	708	73.67%	253	26.33%	0	0.00%	455	47.35%	961
Hancock	725	67.69%	313	29.23%	33	3.08%	412	38.47%	1,071
Harrison	850	62.96%	478	35.41%	22	1.63%	372	27.56%	1,350
Hinds	2,201	69.45%	956	30.17%	12	0.38%	1,245	39.29%	3,169
Holmes	1,664	69.83%	717	30.09%	2	0.08%	947	39.74%	2,383
Issaquena	487	46.16%	568	53.84%	0	0.00%	-81	-7.68%	1,055
Itawamba	1,360	96.45%	50	3.55%	0	0.00%	1,310	92.91%	1,410
Jackson	833	57.17%	616	42.28%	8	0.55%	217	14.89%	1,457
Jasper	1,045	62.95%	611	36.81%	4	0.24%	434	26.14%	1,660
Jefferson	683	65.30%	363	34.70%	0	0.00%	320	30.59%	1,046
Jones	671	100.00%	0	0.00%	0	0.00%	671	100.00%	671
Kemper	1,213	78.87%	325	21.13%	0	0.00%	888	57.74%	1,538
Lafayette	1,687	77.60%	487	22.40%	0	0.00%	1,200	55.20%	2,174
Lauderdale	2,150	86.17%	332	13.31%	13	0.52%	1,818	72.87%	2,495
Lawrence	836	99.52%	2	0.24%	2	0.24%	834	99.29%	840
Leake	1,200	85.17%	209	14.83%	0	0.00%	991	70.33%	1,409
Lee	1,508	98.24%	27	1.76%	0	0.00%	1,481	96.48%	1,535
Leflore	825	99.64%	1	0.12%	2	0.24%	823 (Note: In this county where Fisk ran second ahead of Harrison, margin given is Cleveland vote minus Fisk vote and percentage margin Cleveland percentage minus Fisk percentage.)	99.40%	828
Lincoln	1,097	63.48%	631	36.52%	0	0.00%	466	26.97%	1,728
Lowndes	1,122	98.33%	17	1.49%	2	0.18%	1,105	96.84%	1,141
Madison	2,032	85.49%	344	14.47%	1	0.04%	1,688	71.01%	2,377
Marion	826	98.80%	5	0.60%	5	0.60%	821	98.21%	836
Marshall	2,264	61.45%	1,420	38.55%	0	0.00%	844	22.91%	3,684
Monroe	2,962	87.76%	413	12.24%	0	0.00%	2,549	75.53%	3,375
Montgomery	989	89.34%	118	10.66%	0	0.00%	871	78.68%	1,107
Neshoba	884	99.66%	3	0.34%	0	0.00%	881	99.32%	887
Newton	1,875	93.24%	135	6.71%	1	0.05%	1,740	86.52%	2,011
Noxubee	846	100.00%	0	0.00%	0	0.00%	846	100.00%	846
Oktibbeha	1,342	76.60%	399	22.77%	11	0.63%	943	53.82%	1,752
Panola	1,650	59.55%	1,121	40.45%	0	0.00%	529	19.09%	2,771
Perry	547	91.47%	17	2.84%	34	5.69%	513	85.79%	598
Pike	1,518	71.98%	585	27.74%	6	0.28%	933	44.24%	2,109
Pontotoc	967	65.34%	509	34.39%	4	0.27%	458	30.95%	1,480
Prentiss	1,231	81.42%	281	18.58%	0	0.00%	950	62.83%	1,512
Quitman	105	38.60%	167	61.40%	0	0.00%	-62	-22.79%	272
Rankin	1,545	75.40%	504	24.60%	0	0.00%	1,041	50.81%	2,049
Scott	1,056	90.03%	112	9.55%	5	0.43%	944	80.48%	1,173
Sharkey	228	27.44%	599	72.08%	4	0.48%	-371	-44.65%	831
Simpson	750	79.45%	193	20.44%	1	0.11%	557	59.00%	944
Smith	1,082	99.63%	2	0.18%	2	0.18%	1,080	99.45%	1,086
Sunflower	365	96.31%	14	3.69%	0	0.00%	351	92.61%	379
Tallahatchie	1,021	97.33%	28	2.67%	0	0.00%	993	94.66%	1,049
Tate	1,931	81.55%	437	18.45%	0	0.00%	1,494	63.09%	2,368
Tippah	1,301	72.89%	483	27.06%	1	0.06%	818	45.83%	1,785
Tishomingo	810	84.46%	144	15.02%	5	0.52%	666	69.45%	959
Tunica	509	34.74%	956	65.26%	0	0.00%	-447	-30.51%	1,465
Union	1,409	77.85%	397	21.93%	4	0.22%	1,012	55.91%	1,810
Warren	2,364	71.16%	958	28.84%	0	0.00%	1,406	42.32%	3,322
Washington	1,850	58.16%	1,322	41.56%	9	0.28%	528	16.60%	3,181
Wayne	690	58.08%	494	41.58%	4	0.34%	196	16.50%	1,188
Webster	725	81.64%	161	18.13%	2	0.23%	564	63.51%	888
Wilkinson	495	93.05%	37	6.95%	0	0.00%	458	86.09%	532
Winston	708	99.72%	0	0.00%	2	0.28%	706	99.44%	710
Yalobusha	1,046	83.21%	211	16.79%	0	0.00%	835	66.43%	1,257
Yazoo	1,196	99.42%	7	0.58%	0	0.00%	1,189	98.84%	1,203
Totals	85,451	73.80%	30,096	25.99%	240	0.21%	55,355	47.81%	115,787

== See also ==
- United States presidential elections in Mississippi
