= 1888 United States presidential election =

Election of Benjamin Harrison

- November 6, 1888

401 members of the Electoral College 201 electoral votes needed to win
- Turnout: 80.5% (▲3.0 pp)
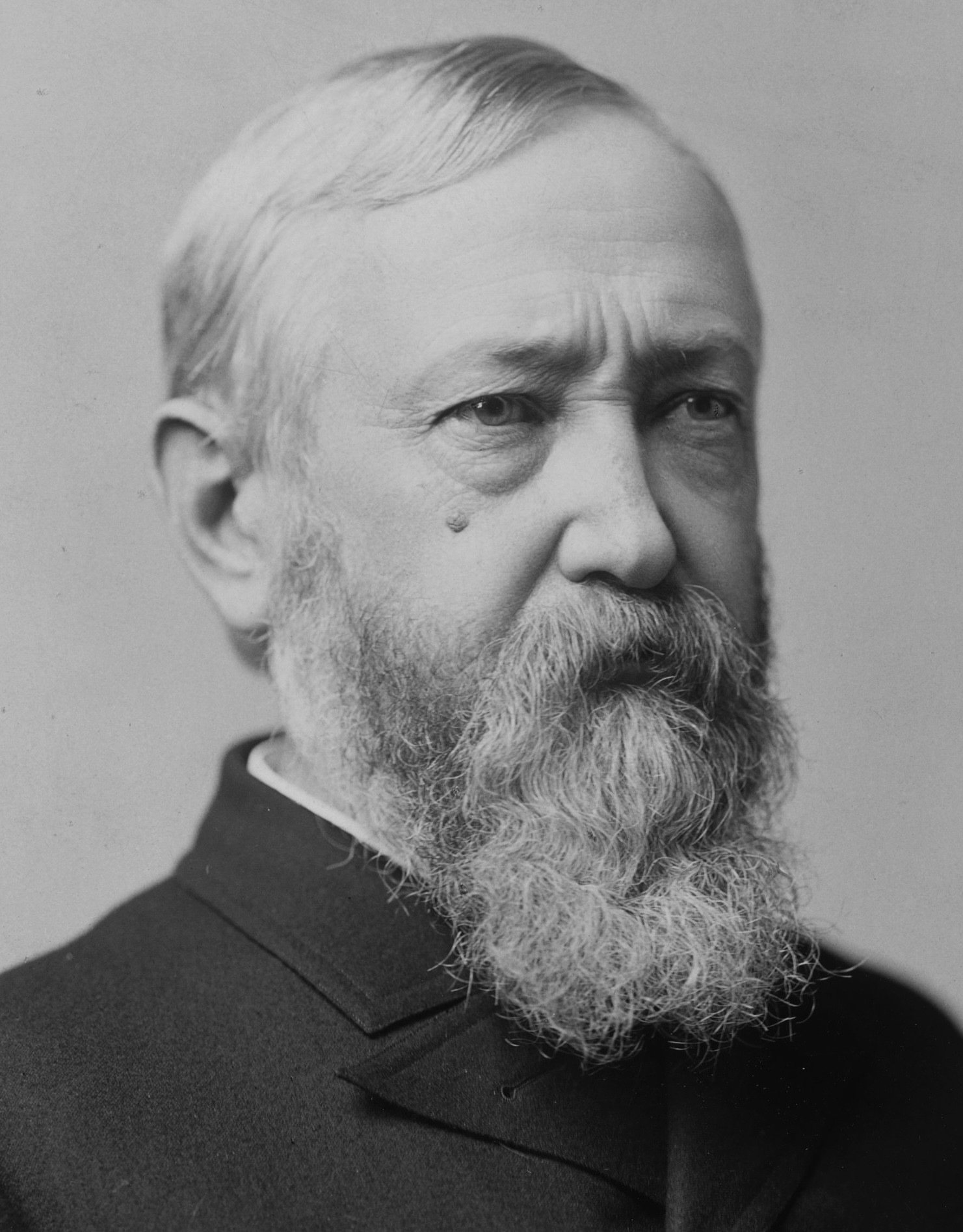

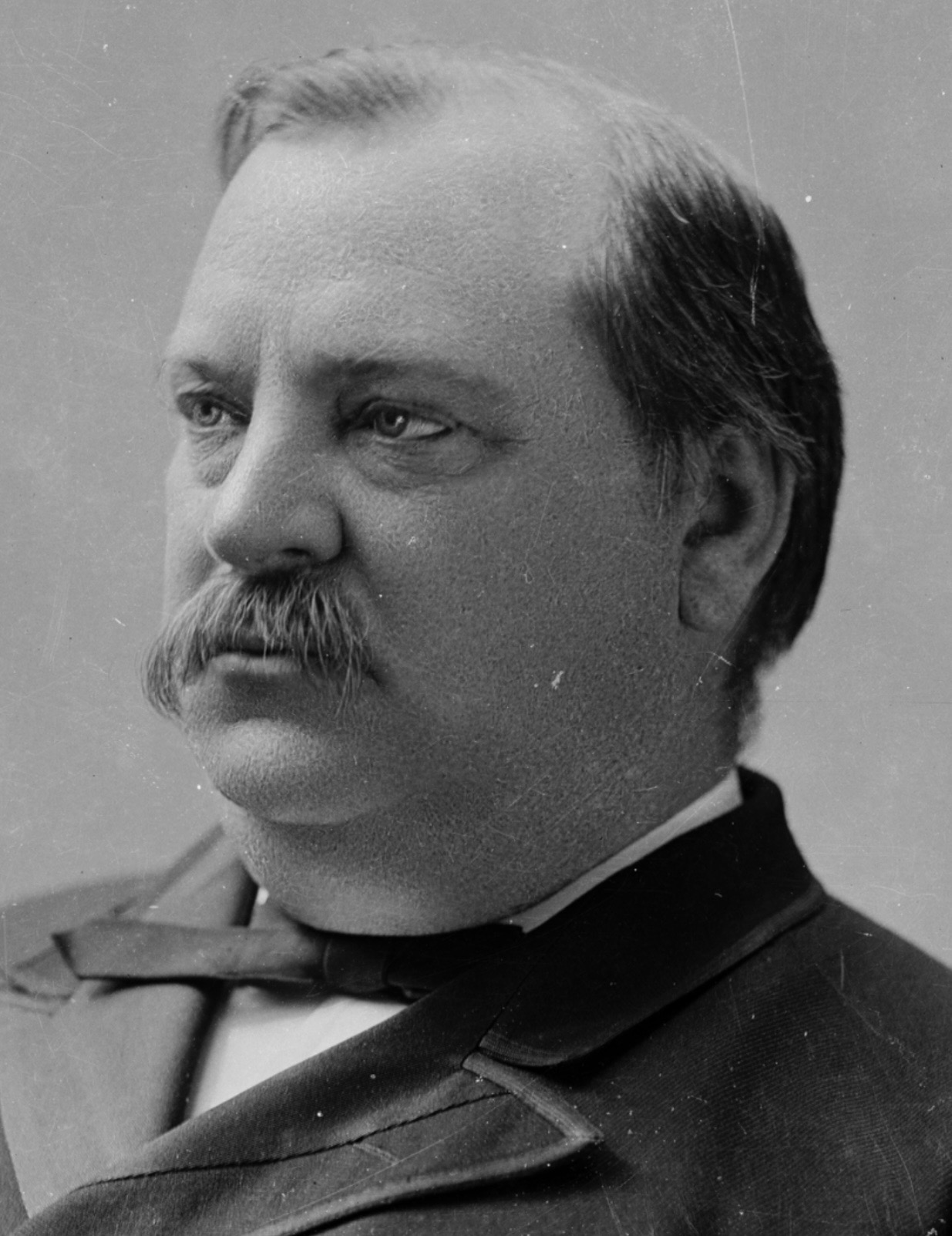
Nominee	Benjamin Harrison	Grover Cleveland
Party	Republican	Democratic
Home state	Indiana	New York
Running mate	Levi P. Morton	Allen G. Thurman
Electoral vote	233	168
States carried	20	18
Popular vote	5,443,892	5,538,163
Percentage	47.8%	48.6%
- Presidential election results map. Red denotes those won by Harrison/Morton, blue denotes states won by Cleveland/Thurman. Numbers indicate the number of electoral votes allotted to each state.
President before election
Grover Cleveland
Democratic
Elected President
Benjamin Harrison
Republican

A presidential election was held in the United States on November 6, 1888. The Republican ticket of former Indiana Senator Benjamin Harrison and former United States Minister to France Levi P. Morton of New York defeated the Democratic ticket of incumbent President Grover Cleveland of New York and former Ohio Senator Allen G. Thurman. It was the third of five U.S. presidential elections (and second within 12 years) in which the winner did not win the national popular vote, which would not occur again until 2000.

Cleveland, only the second Democratic president since the American Civil War (the first being Andrew Johnson) and the first elected as president (Johnson assumed office after Lincoln's assassination, and left at the end of the term), was unanimously renominated at the 1888 Democratic National Convention. Harrison, the grandson of former President William Henry Harrison, emerged as the Republican nominee on the eighth ballot of the 1888 Republican National Convention. He defeated other prominent party leaders such as Ohio Senator John Sherman and former Michigan Governor Russell Alger.

Tariff policy was the principal issue in the election, as Cleveland had proposed a dramatic reduction in tariffs, arguing that high tariffs were unfair to consumers. Harrison took the side of industrialists and factory workers who wanted to keep tariffs high. Cleveland's opposition to American Civil War pensions and inflated currency also made enemies among veterans and farmers. On the other hand, he held a strong hand in the Southern United States and the border states, and appealed to former Republican Mugwumps.

Cleveland won a narrow plurality of the popular vote, in large part due to the disenfranchisement of Black citizens (who mostly favored Harrison) in the South, (Note: Multiple references) but Harrison won the election with a majority in the Electoral College, marking the only time (as of 2024) that an incumbent president lost a reelection bid despite winning the popular vote. Harrison swept almost the entire North and Midwest, including narrowly carrying the swing states of New York and Indiana. This was the first time since 1856 that Democrats won the popular vote in consecutive elections. This was the first election since 1840 in which an incumbent president lost reelection. Cleveland was the last incumbent Democratic president to lose reelection until Jimmy Carter in 1980. As of 2024, this was the last presidential election in which the winner did not carry a single former slave state.

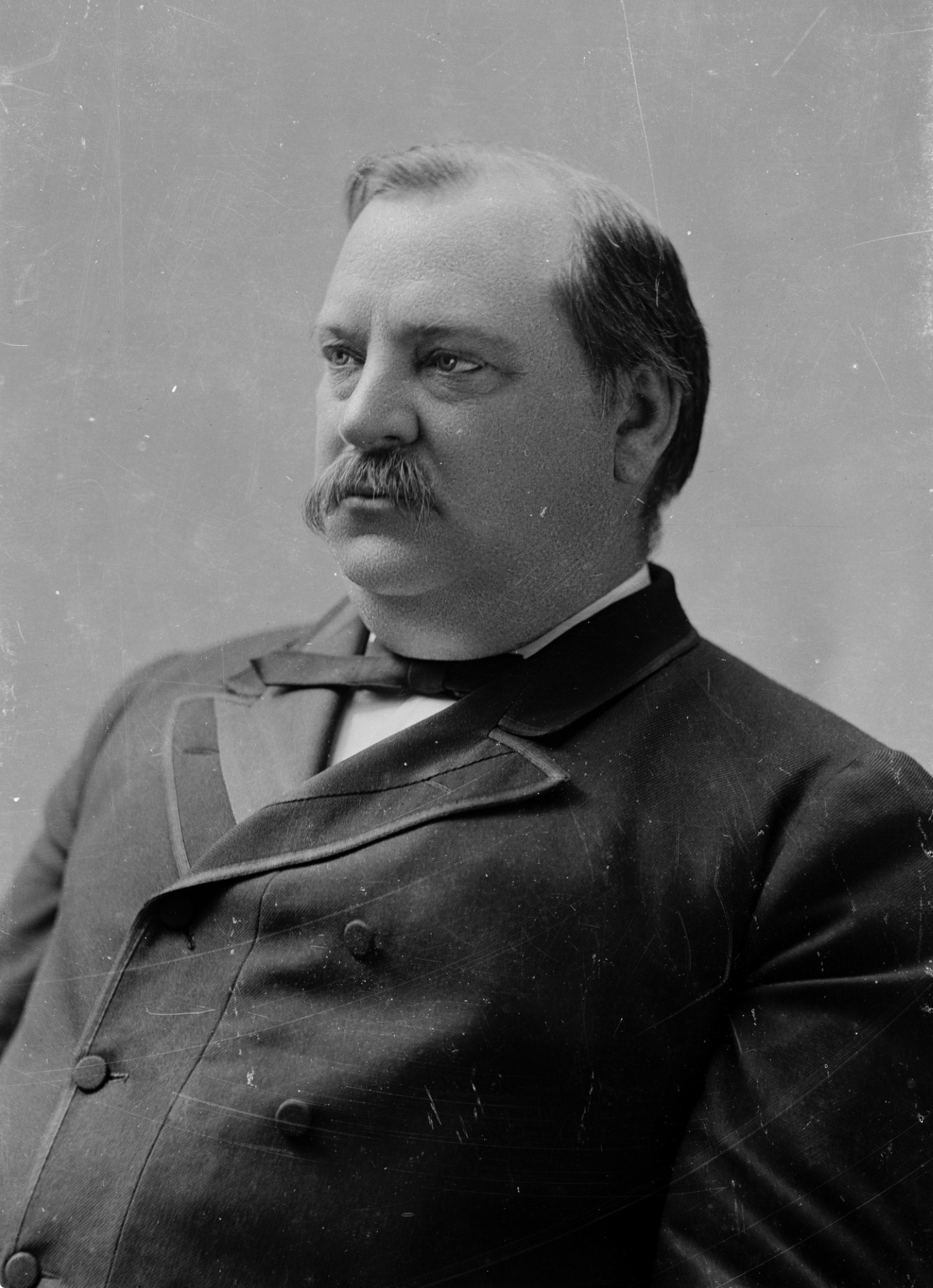
Grover Cleveland, the incumbent president in 1888, whose first non-consecutive term expired on March 4, 1889

== Nominations ==
=== Republican Party nomination ===
Republican Party (United States) 1888 Republican Party ticket
Benjamin Harrison	Levi P. Morton
for President	for Vice President
U.S. Senator from Indiana (1881–1887)	United States Ambassador to France (1881–1885)

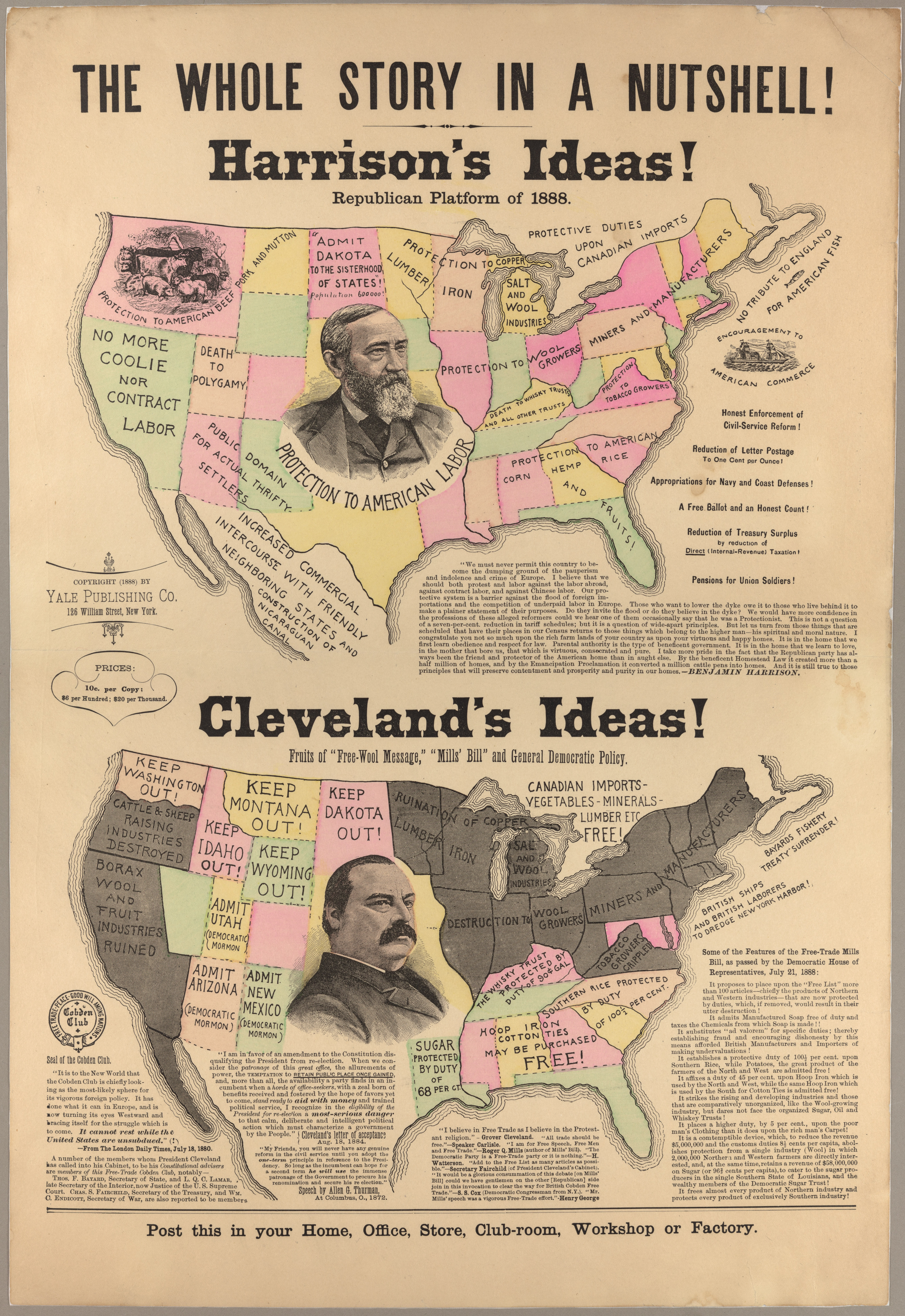
Grover Cleveland-Benjamin Harrison presidential (1888) campaign poster about the trade policy of the two candidates. The map supports the work of the Harrison campaign.

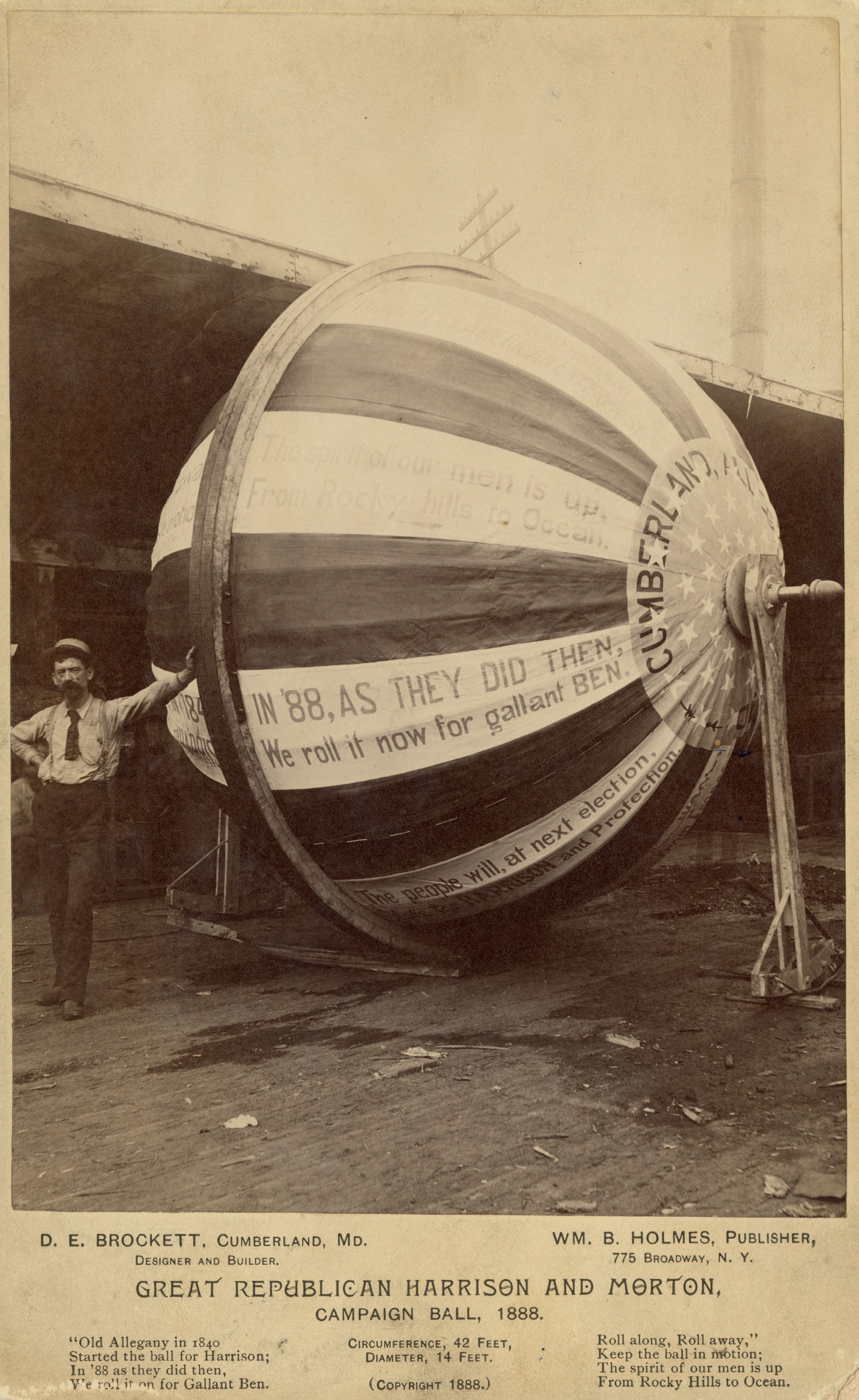
Man leaning on Harrison and Morton campaign ball.

The Republican candidates were former Senator Benjamin Harrison from Indiana; Senator John Sherman from Ohio; Russell A. Alger, the former governor of Michigan; Walter Q. Gresham from Indiana, the former Secretary of the Treasury; Senator William B. Allison from Iowa; and Chauncey Depew from New York, the president of the New York Central Railroad.

By the time Republicans met in Chicago on June 19–25, 1888, frontrunner James G. Blaine had withdrawn from the race because he believed that only a harmonious convention would produce a Republican candidate strong enough to upset incumbent President Cleveland. Blaine realized that the party was unlikely to choose him without a bitter struggle. After he withdrew, Blaine expressed confidence in both Benjamin Harrison and John Sherman. Harrison was nominated on the eighth ballot.

The Republicans chose Harrison because of his war record, his popularity with veterans, his ability to express the Republican Party's views, and the fact that he lived in the swing state of Indiana. The Republicans hoped to win Indiana's 15 electoral votes, which had gone to Cleveland in the previous presidential election. Levi P. Morton, a former New York City congressman and ambassador, was nominated for vice-president over William Walter Phelps, his nearest rival.

=== Democratic Party nomination ===
Democratic Party (United States) 1888 Democratic Party ticket
Grover Cleveland	Allen G. Thurman
for President	for Vice President
22nd President of the United States (1885–1889)	U.S. Senator from Ohio (1869–1881)
Campaign

The Democratic National Convention held in St. Louis, Missouri, on June 5–7, 1888, was harmonious. Incumbent President Cleveland was re-nominated unanimously without a formal ballot. This was the first time an incumbent Democratic president had been re-nominated since Martin Van Buren in 1840.

After Cleveland was re-nominated, Democrats had to choose a replacement for Thomas A. Hendricks. Hendricks ran unsuccessfully as the Democratic nominee for vice-president in 1876, but won the office when he ran again with Cleveland in 1884. Hendricks served as vice-president for only eight months before he died in office on November 25, 1885. Former Senator Allen G. Thurman from Ohio was nominated for vice-president over Isaac P. Gray, his nearest rival, and John C. Black, who trailed behind. Gray lost the nomination to Thurman primarily because his opponents brought up his actions while a Republican.

The Democratic platform largely confined itself to a defense of the Cleveland administration, supporting reduction in the tariff and taxes generally as well as statehood for the western territories.

Presidential Ballot
	Unanimous
Grover Cleveland	822

Vice Presidential Ballot
	1st	Acclamation
Allen G. Thurman	684	822
Isaac P. Gray	101	
John C. Black	36	
Blank	1	

=== Prohibition Party nomination ===
==== Nominees ====
1888 Prohibition Party ticket
Clinton B. Fisk	John A. Brooks
for President	for Vice President
Brigadier General from New Jersey	Pastor from Missouri
Campaign

The 5th Prohibition Party National Convention assembled in Tomlinson Hall in Indianapolis, Indiana. There were 1,029 delegates from every state but three.

Clinton B. Fisk was nominated for president unanimously. John A. Brooks was nominated for vice-president.

=== Union Labor Party nomination ===
==== Nominees ====
1888 Union Labor Party ticket
Alson Streeter	Charles E. Cunningham
for President	for Vice President
State Senator from Illinois	Activist from Arkansas
Campaign

300 to 600 delegates attended the Industrial Labor Conference in Cincinnati in February 1887, and formed the Union Labor Party. The delegates were generally made up of rural Greenbackers and urban trade unionists. Richard Trevellick, the chair of the conference, was a member of the Knights of Labor and a former member of the Greenback Party.

The party's 1888 convention nominated Alson Streeter for president unanimously. He was so widely popular that no ballot was necessary, instead, he was nominated by acclamation. Samuel Evans was nominated for vice president but declined the nomination. Charles E. Cunningham was later selected as the vice-presidential candidate.

The Union Labor Party garnered nearly 150,000 popular votes, but failed to carry any states or gain widespread national support. The party did, however, win two counties.

=== United Labor Party nomination ===
The United Labor Party convention nominated Robert H. Cowdrey for president on the first ballot. W.H.T. Wakefield of Kansas was nominated for vice-president over Victor H. Wilder from New York by a margin of 50–12.

=== Greenback Party ===
The Greenback Party was in decline throughout the entire Cleveland administration. In the election of 1884, the party failed to win any House seats outright, although they did win one seat in conjunction with Plains States Democrats (James B. Weaver) and a handful of other seats by endorsing the Democratic nominee. In the election of 1886, only two dozen Greenback candidates ran for the House, apart from another six who ran on fusion tickets. Again, Weaver was the party's only victor. Much of the Greenback news in early 1888 took place in Michigan, where the party remained active.

In early 1888, it was not clear if the Greenback Party would hold another national convention. The fourth Greenback Party National Convention assembled in Cincinnati on May 16, 1888. So few delegates attended that no actions were taken. On August 16, 1888, George O. Jones, chairman of the national committee, called a second session of the national convention. The second session of the national convention met in Cincinnati on September 12, 1888. Only seven delegates attended. Chairman Jones issued an address criticizing the two major parties, and the delegates made no nominations.

With the failure of the convention, the Greenback Party ceased to exist.

=== American Party nomination ===
The American Party held its third and last National Convention in Grand Army Hall in Washington, DC. This was an Anti-Masonic party that ran under various party labels in the northern states.

When the convention assembled, there were 126 delegates; among them were 65 from New York and 15 from California. Delegates from the other states bolted the convention when it appeared that New York and California intended to vote together on all matters and control the convention. By the time the presidential balloting began, there were only 64 delegates present.

The convention nominated James L. Curtis from New York for president and James R. Greer from Tennessee for vice-president. Greer declined to run, so Peter D. Wigginton of California was chosen as his replacement.

Presidential Ballot
Candidate	1st
James L. Curtis	45
Abram S. Hewitt	15
James S. Negley	4

=== Equal Rights Party nomination ===
The second Equal Rights Party National Convention assembled in Des Moines, Iowa. At the convention, mail-in ballots were counted. The delegates cast 310 of their 350 ballots for the following ticket: Belva Ann Lockwood for president and Alfred H. Love for vice-president. Love declined the nomination, and was replaced with Charles S. Welles of New York.

=== Industrial Reform Party nomination ===
The Industrial Reform Party National Convention assembled in Grand Army Hall, Washington, DC. There were 49 delegates present. Albert Redstone won the endorsement of some leaders of the disintegrating Greenback Party. He told the Montgomery Advertiser that he hoped to carry several states, including Alabama, New York, North Carolina, Arkansas, Pennsylvania, Illinois, Iowa, and Missouri.

== General election campaign ==
=== Issues ===
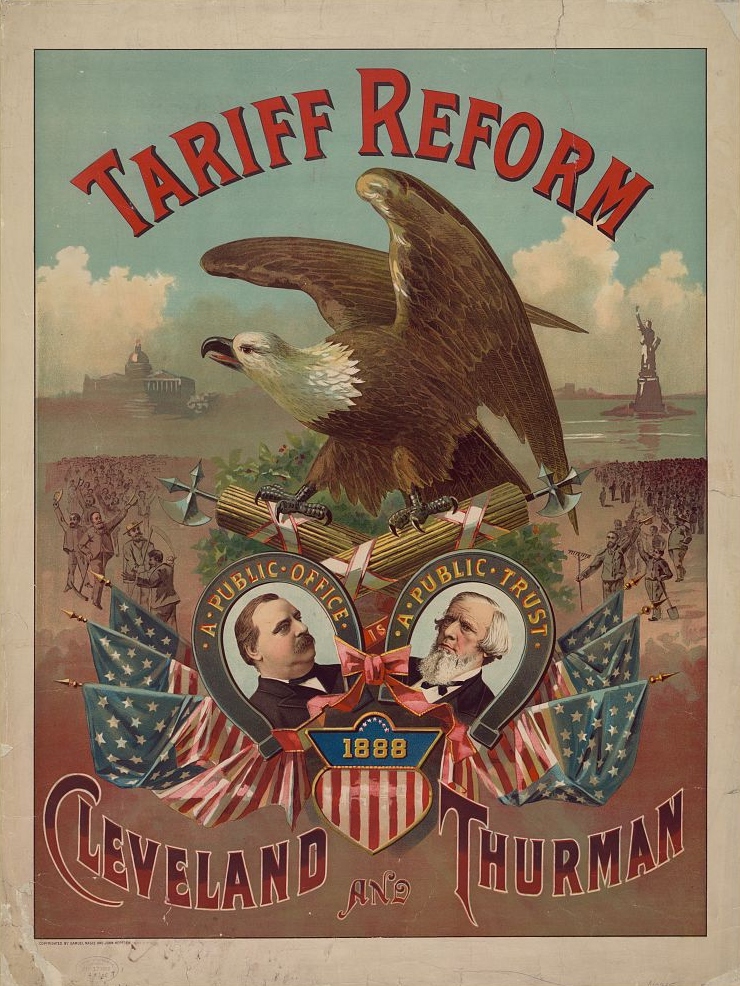
Tariff reform was the main issue of the election.

Cleveland set the main issue of the campaign when he proposed a dramatic reduction in tariffs in his annual message to Congress in December 1887. Cleveland contended that the tariff was unnecessarily high and that unnecessary taxation was unjust taxation. The Republicans responded that the high tariff would protect American industry from foreign competition and guarantee high wages, high profits, and high economic growth.

The argument between protectionists and free traders over the size of the tariff was an old one, stretching back to the Tariff of 1816. In practice, the tariff was practically meaningless on industrial products, since the United States was the low-cost producer in most areas (except woolens), and could not be undersold by the less efficient Europeans. Nevertheless, the tariff issue motivated both sides to a remarkable extent.

Besides the obvious economic dimensions, the tariff argument also possessed an ethnic dimension. At the time, the policy of free trade was most strongly promoted by the British Empire, and so any political candidate who ran on free trade instantly was under threat of being labelled pro-British and antagonistic to the Irish-American voting bloc. Cleveland neatly neutralized this threat by pursuing punitive action against Canada (which, although autonomous, was still part of the British Empire) in a fishing rights dispute.

Harrison was well-funded by party activists and mounted an energetic campaign by the standards of the day, giving many speeches from his front porch in Indianapolis that were covered by the newspapers. Cleveland adhered to the tradition of presidential candidates not campaigning, and forbade his cabinet from campaigning as well, leaving his 75-year-old vice-presidential candidate Thurman as the spearhead of his campaign.

=== Blocks of Five ===
William Wade Dudley (1842–1909), an Indianapolis lawyer, was a tireless campaigner and prosecutor of Democratic election frauds. In 1888, Benjamin Harrison made Dudley Treasurer of the Republican National Committee. The campaign was the most intense in decades, with Indiana dead even. Although the National Committee had no business meddling in state politics, Dudley wrote a circular letter to Indiana's county chairmen, telling them to "divide the floaters into Blocks of Five, and put a trusted man with the necessary funds in charge of these five, and make them responsible that none get away and that all vote our ticket." Dudley promised adequate funding. His pre-emptive strike backfired when Democrats obtained the letter and distributed hundreds of thousands of copies nationwide in the last days of the campaign. Given Dudley's unsavory reputation, few people believed his denials. A few thousand "floaters" did exist in Indiana—men who would sell their vote for $2. They always divided 50–50 (or perhaps, $5,000–$5,000) and had no visible impact on the vote. The attack on "blocks of five" with the suggestion that pious General Harrison was trying to buy the election did enliven the Democratic campaign, and it stimulated the nationwide movement to replace ballots printed and distributed by the parties with secret ballots.

=== Murchison letter ===
A California Republican named George Osgoodby wrote a letter to Sir Lionel Sackville-West, the British ambassador to the United States, under the assumed name of "Charles F. Murchison," describing himself as a former Englishman who was now a California citizen and asked how he should vote in the upcoming presidential election. Sir Lionel wrote back and in the "Murchison letter" indiscreetly suggested that Cleveland was probably the best man from the British point of view.

The Republicans published this letter just two weeks before the election, where it had an effect on Irish-American voters exactly comparable to the "Rum, Romanism, and Rebellion" blunder of the previous election: Cleveland lost New York and Indiana (and as a result, the presidency). Sackville-West was removed as British ambassador.

== Results ==
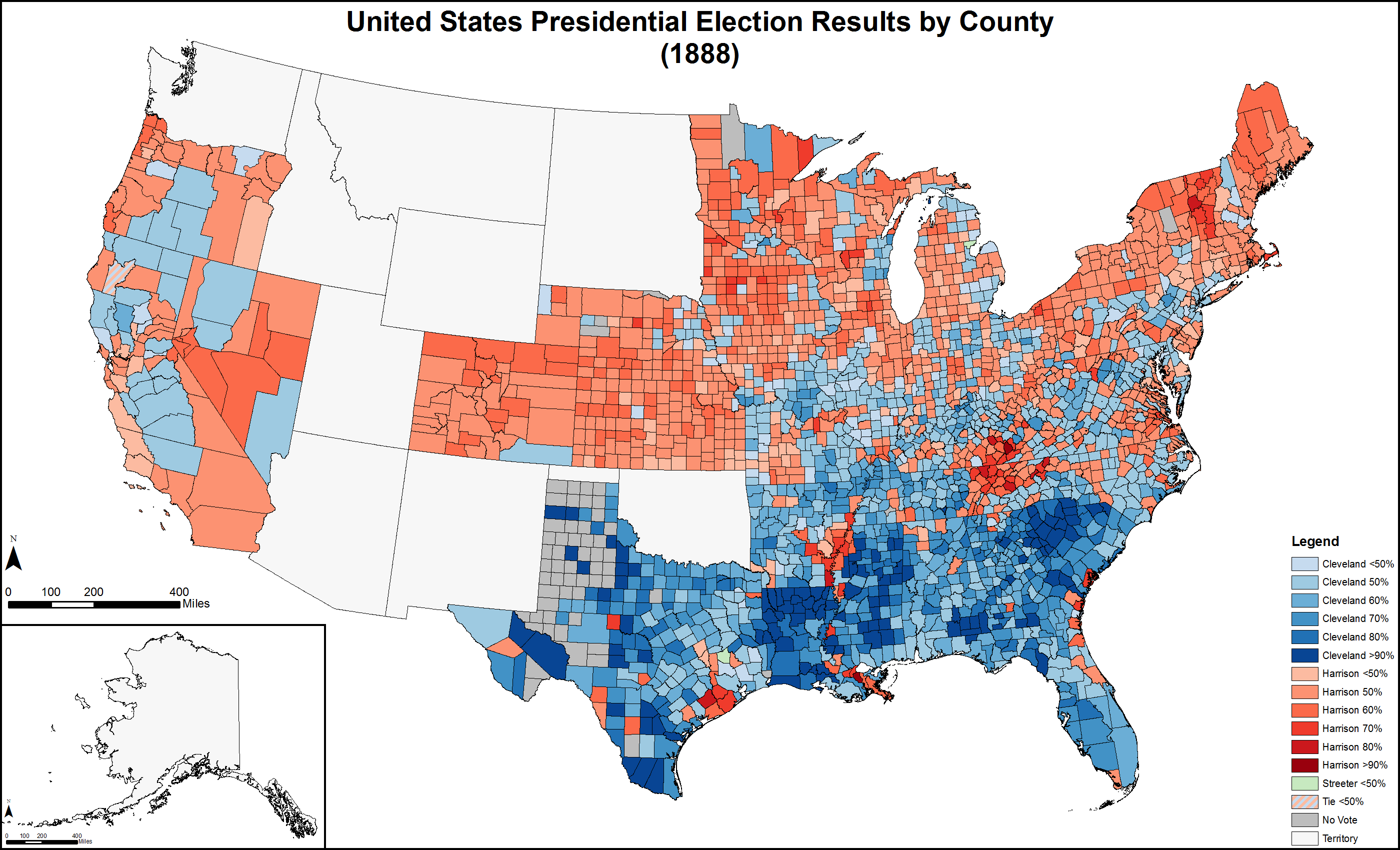
Results by county indicating the percentage lead of each candidate in each county. Shades of blue are for Cleveland (Democratic), shades of red are for Harrison (Republican), and shades of green are for Streeter (Union Labor).

36.3% of the voting age population and 80.5% of eligible voters participated in the election.

The election focused on the swing states of New York, New Jersey, Connecticut, and Harrison's home state of Indiana. Harrison and Cleveland split these four states, with Harrison winning by means of notoriously fraudulent balloting in New York and Indiana. Meanwhile, Cleveland won every state in the south via the disenfranchisement of much of the Southern black voter base. The Republicans won in twenty-six of the forty-four largest cities outside of the Southern United States.

Had Cleveland won his home state, he would have won the electoral vote by an electoral count of 204–197 (201 electoral votes were needed for victory in 1888). Instead, Cleveland became the third of only five candidates—all Democrats—to obtain a plurality or majority of the popular vote but lose their respective presidential elections (Andrew Jackson in 1824, Samuel J. Tilden in 1876, Al Gore in 2000, and Hillary Clinton in 2016). However, Tilden was the only one of these to win of a majority of the popular vote.

Cleveland bested Harrison in the popular vote by slightly more than ninety thousand votes (0.8%), though that margin was only made possible by massive disenfranchisement and voter suppression of hundreds of thousands of Republican blacks in the South, as was noted by Republican politicians at the time.

Harrison won the Electoral College by a 233–168 margin, largely by virtue of his 1.09% win in Cleveland's home state of New York.

14.18% of Harrison's votes came from the eleven states of the former Confederacy, with him taking 36.67% of the vote in that region. This was the only time Florida voted for a Democratic nominee who won the popular vote but lost the electoral vote. In 1876, 2000, and 2016, Florida voted for a Republican nominee who won the electoral vote but lost the popular vote. (Florida became a state in 1845, and thus did not vote in 1824.)

Four states returned results where the winner won by less than 1 percent of the popular vote. Cleveland earned 24 of his electoral votes from states he won by less than one percent: Connecticut, Virginia, and West Virginia. Harrison earned fifteen of his electoral votes from a state he won by less than 1 percent: Indiana. Harrison won New York (36 electoral votes) by a margin of 1.09%. Despite the narrow margins in several states, only two states switched sides in comparison to Cleveland's first presidential election (New York and Indiana).

Of the 2,450 counties/independent cities making returns, Cleveland led in 1,290 (52.65%) while Harrison led in 1,157 (47.22%). Two counties (0.08%) recorded a plurality for Union Labor candidate Alson Streeter, while one county (0.04%) in California split evenly between Cleveland and Harrison.

Upon leaving the White House at the end of her husband's first term, First Lady Frances Cleveland is reported to have told the White House staff to take care of the building since the Clevelands would be returning in four years. She proved correct, becoming the first First Lady to preside at two nonconsecutive administrations.

This was the last election in which the Republicans won Colorado and Nevada until 1904. It was also the last election until 1968 when bellwether Coös County, New Hampshire, did not support the winning candidate.

Electoral results
Presidential candidate	Party	Home state	Popular vote		Electoral vote	Running mate		
Presidential candidate	Party	Home state	Count	Percentage	Electoral vote	Vice-presidential candidate	Home state	Electoral vote
Benjamin Harrison	Republican	Indiana	5,443,892	47.80%	233	Levi P. Morton	New York	233
Grover Cleveland (incumbent)	Democratic	New York	5,534,488	48.63%	168	Allen G. Thurman	Ohio	168
Clinton B. Fisk	Prohibition	New Jersey	249,819	2.20%	0	John A. Brooks	Missouri	0
Alson Streeter	Union Labor	Illinois	146,602	1.31%	0	Charles E. Cunningham	Arkansas	0
Other			8,519	0.07%	—	Other		—
Total			11,383,320	100%	401			401
Needed to win					201			201

Source (Popular Vote): Leip, David. "1888 Presidential Election Results". Dave Leip's Atlas of U.S. Presidential Elections. Source (Electoral Vote): "Electoral College Box Scores 1789–1996". National Archives and Records Administration.

Popular vote
Cleveland	48.63%
Harrison	47.80%
Fisk	2.20%
Streeter	1.31%
Others	0.07%

Electoral vote
Harrison	58.10%
Cleveland	41.90%

=== Geography of results ===
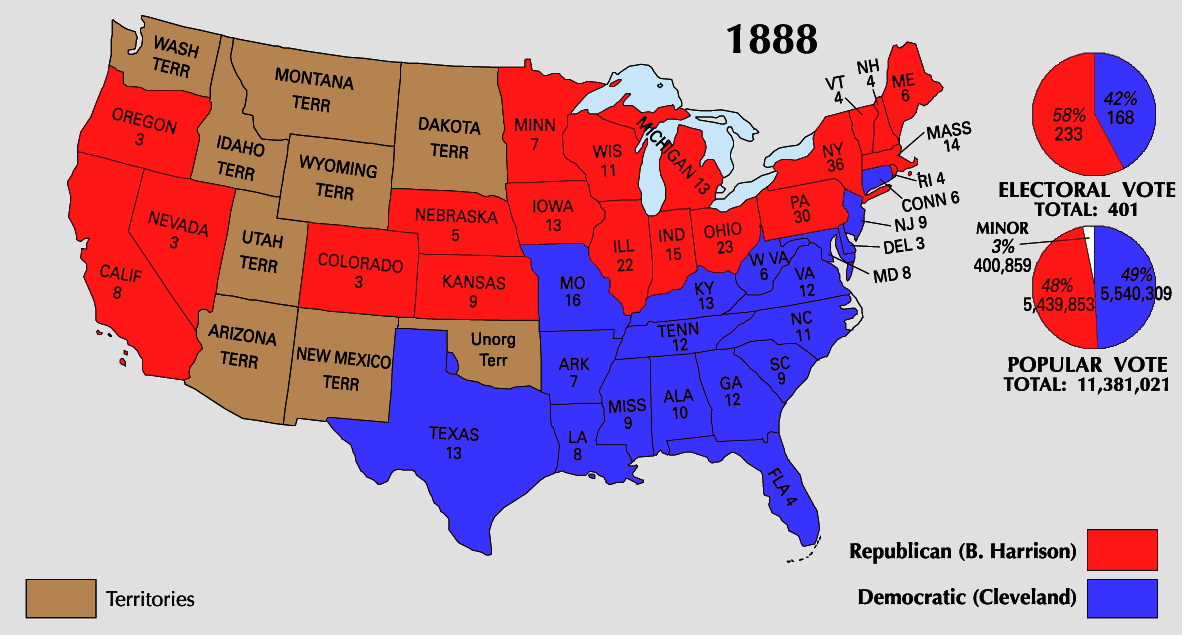

Results by county, shaded according to winning candidate's percentage of the vote

==== Cartographic gallery ====
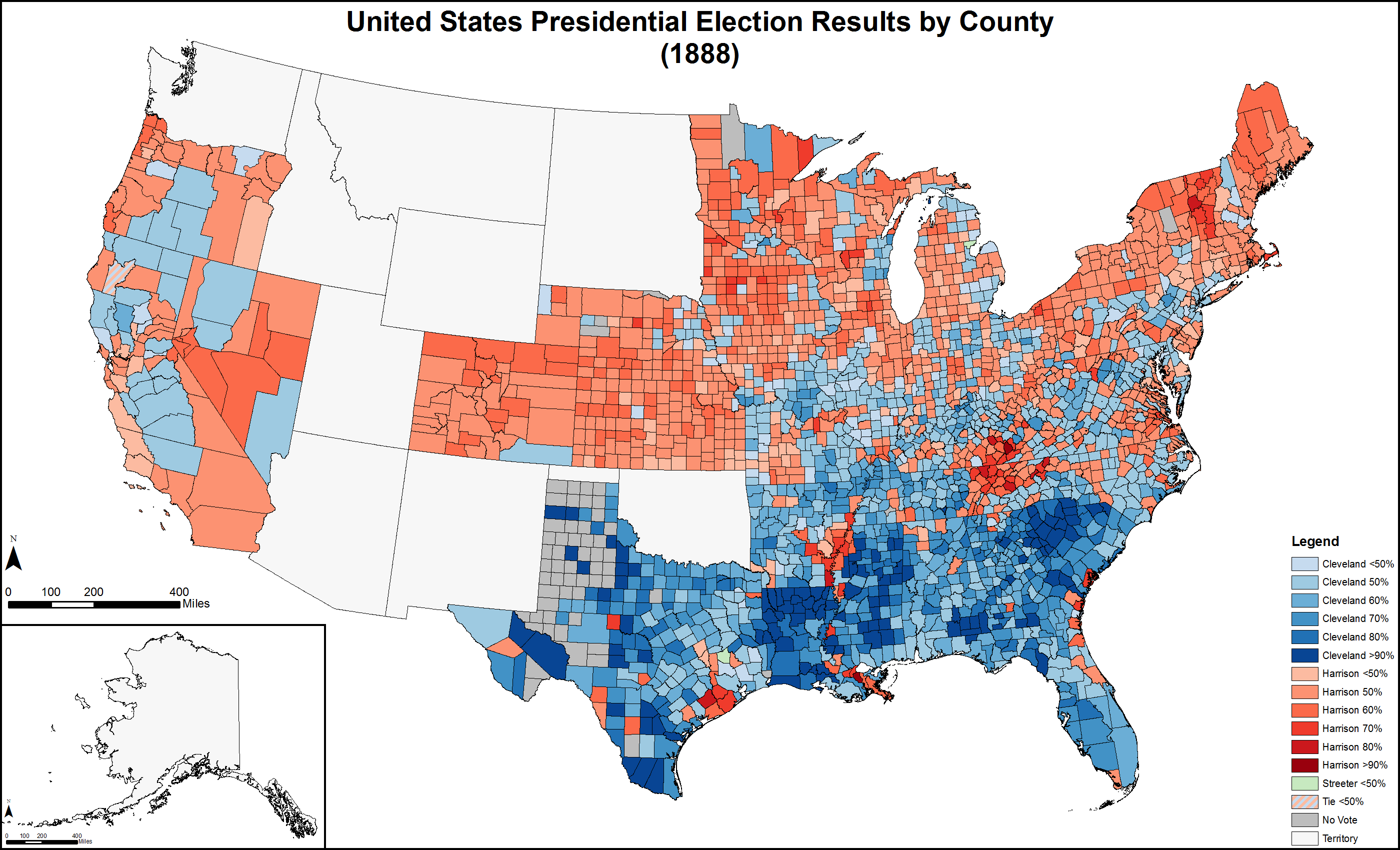
Map of presidential election results by county

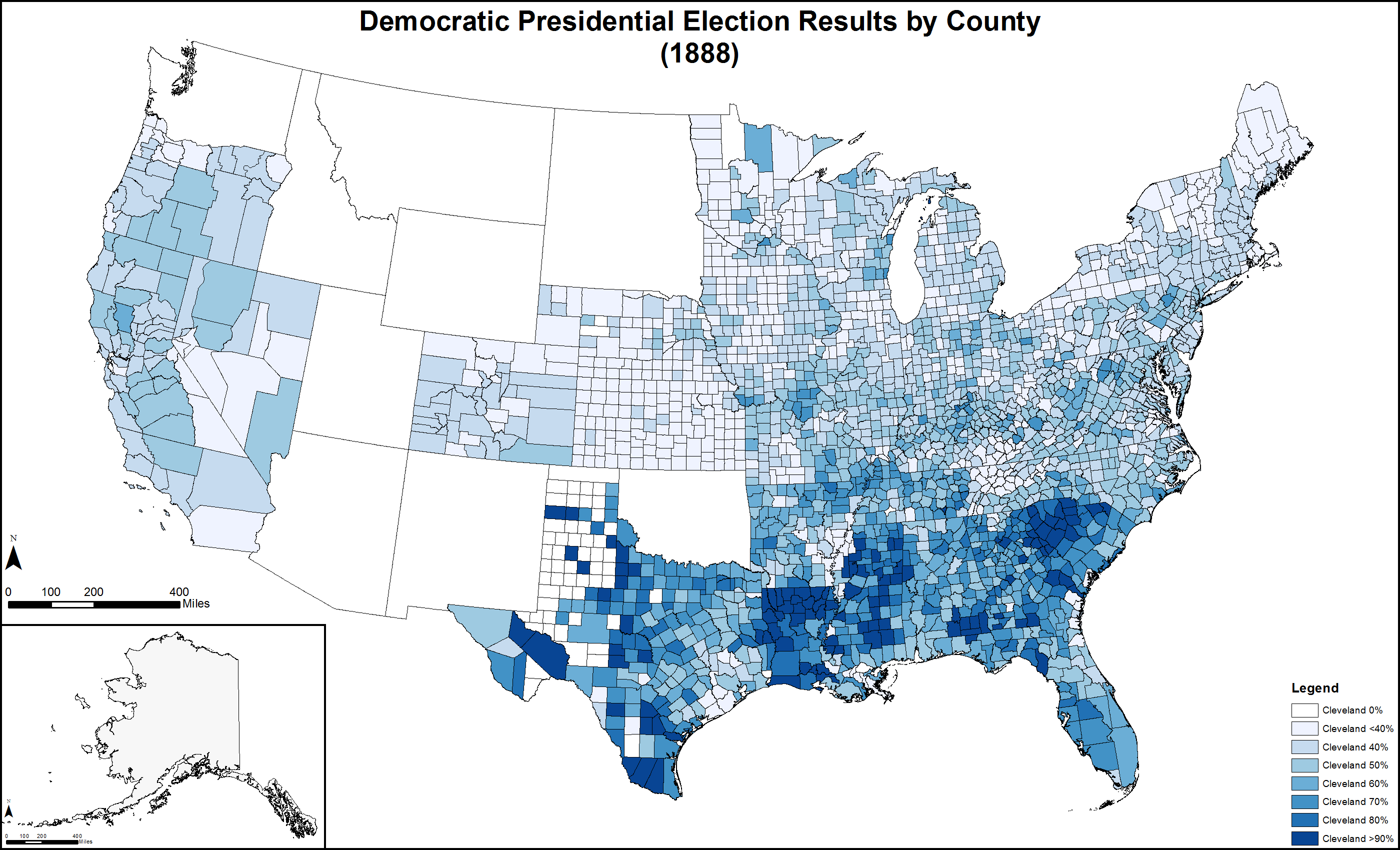
Map of Democratic presidential election results by county

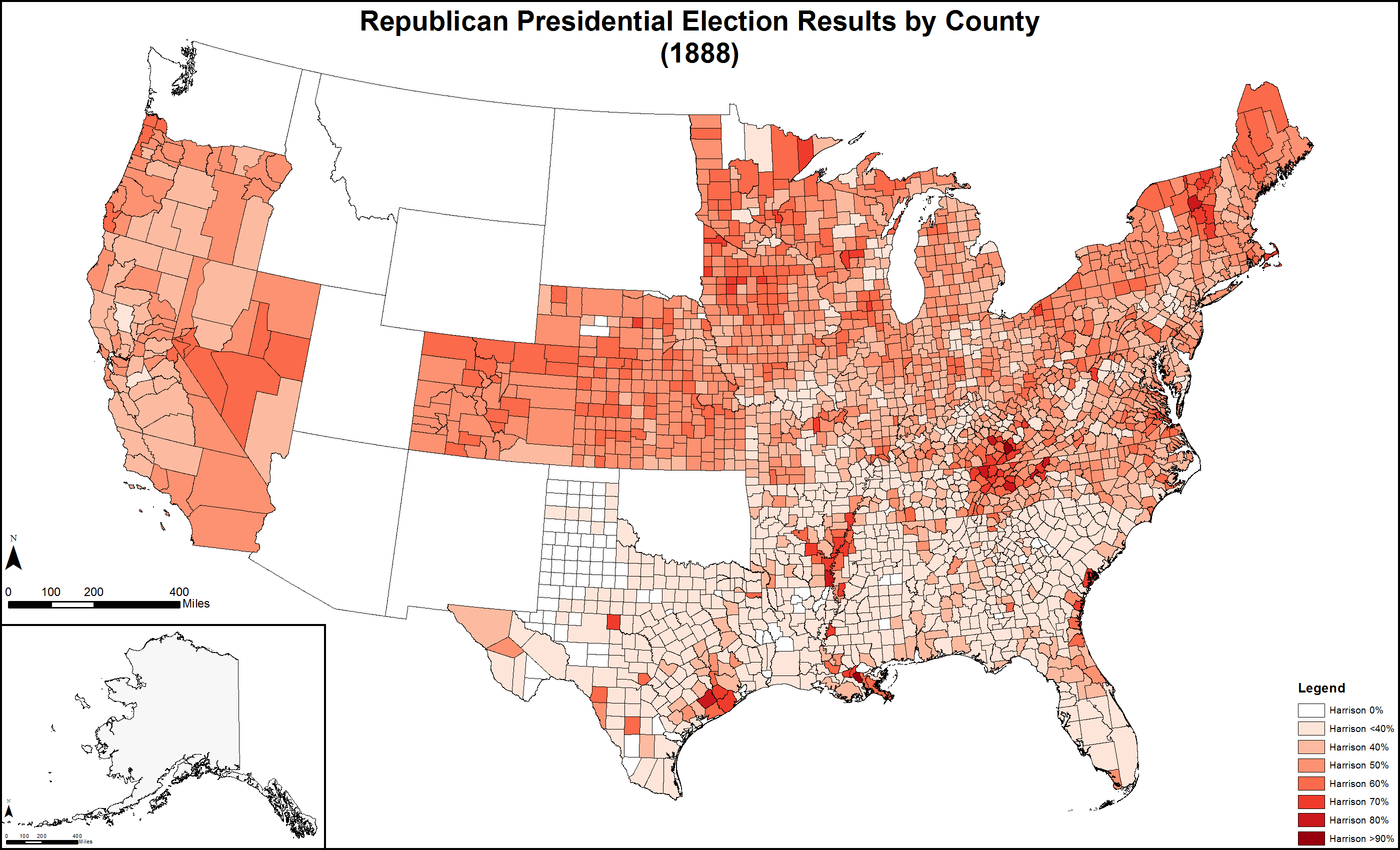
Map of Republican presidential election results by county

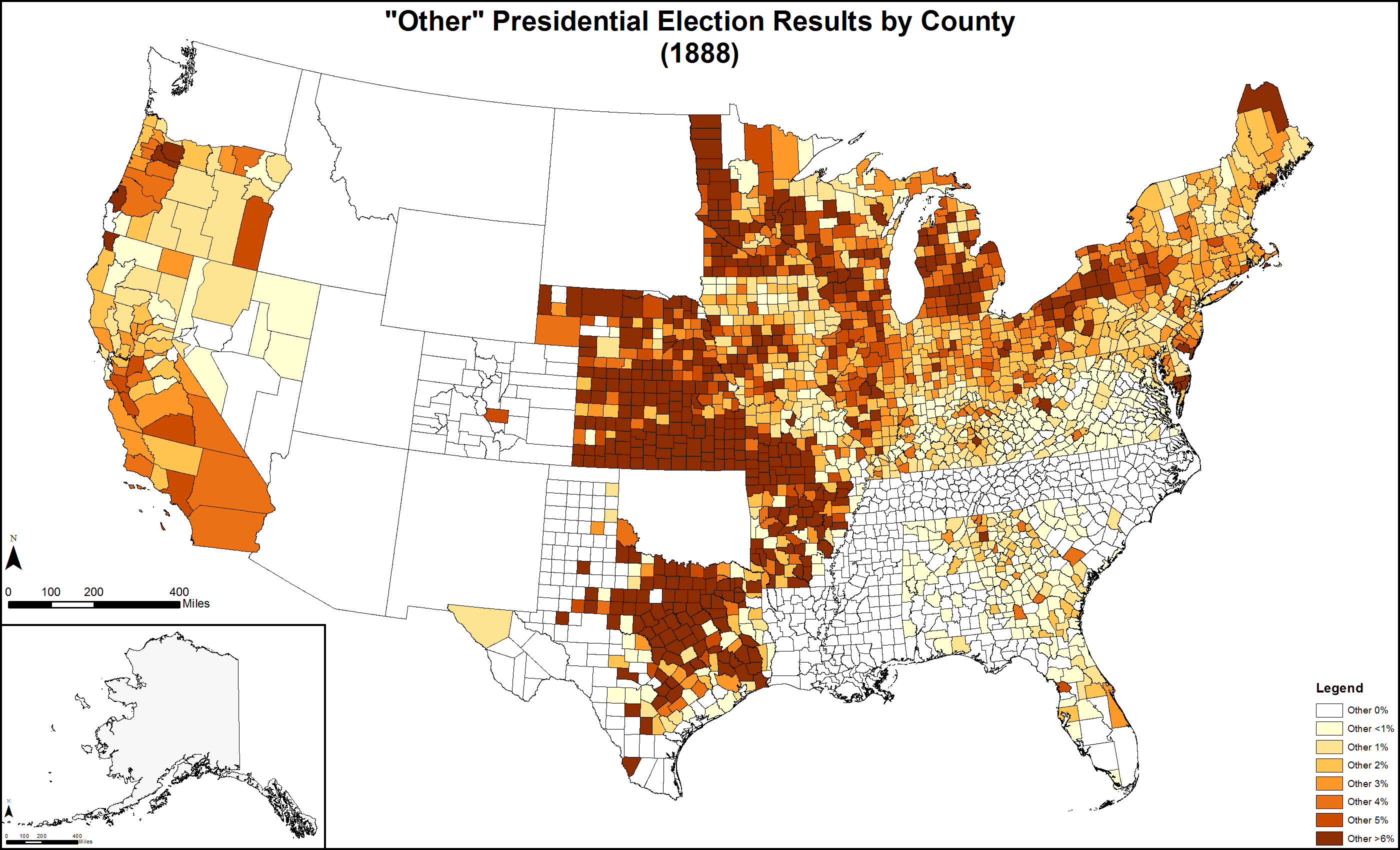
Map of "other" presidential election results by county

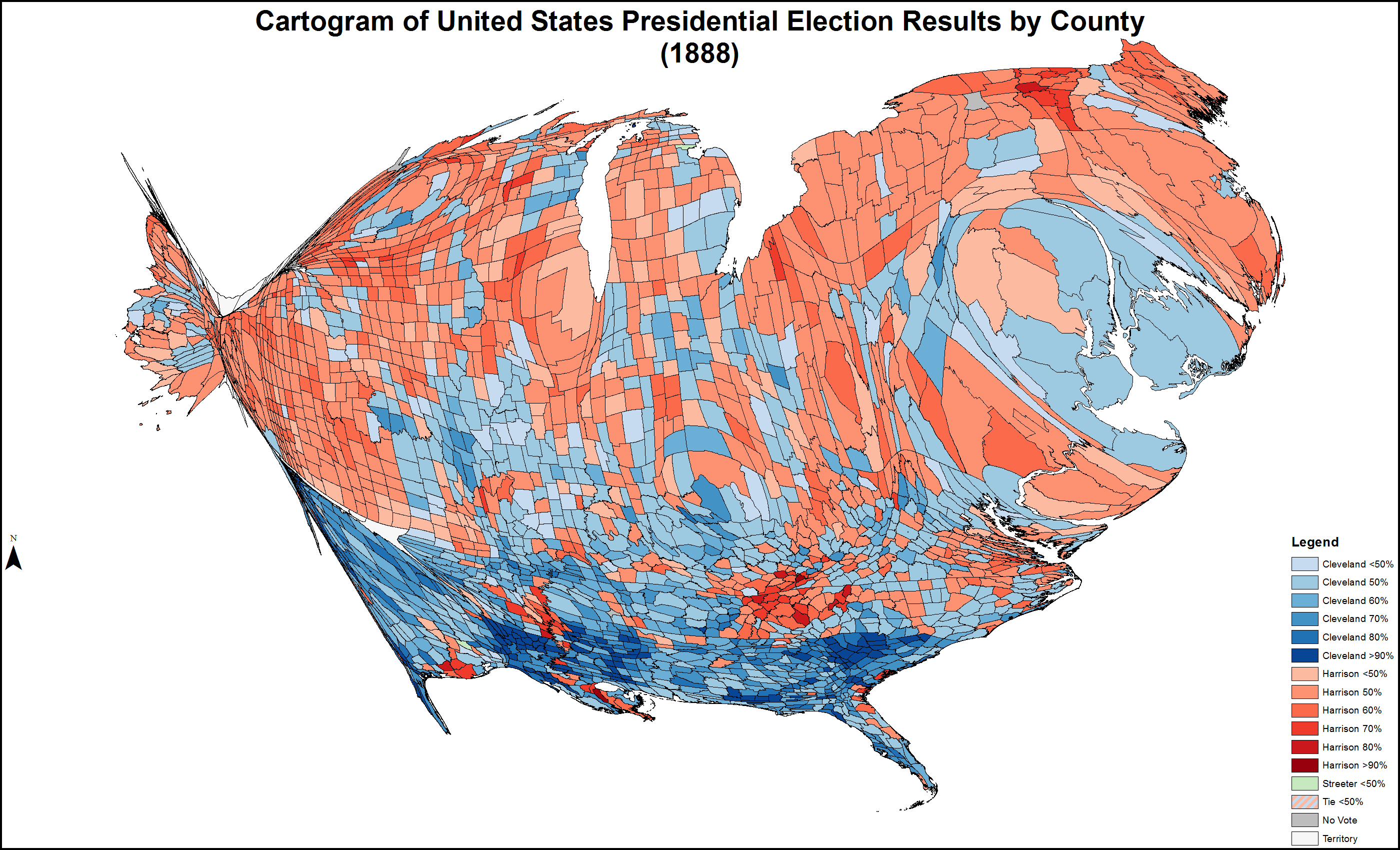
Cartogram of presidential election results by county

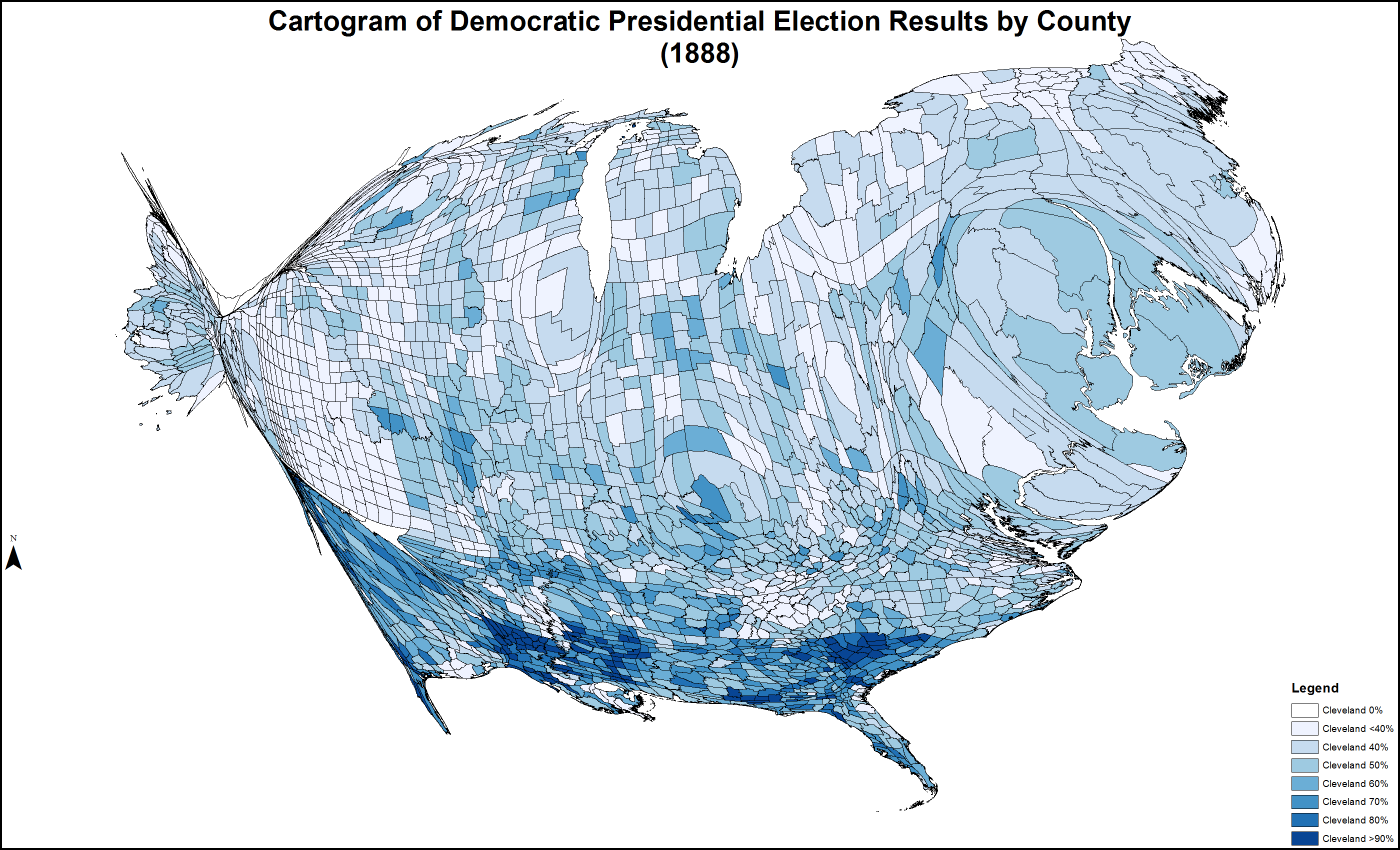
Cartogram of Democratic presidential election results by county

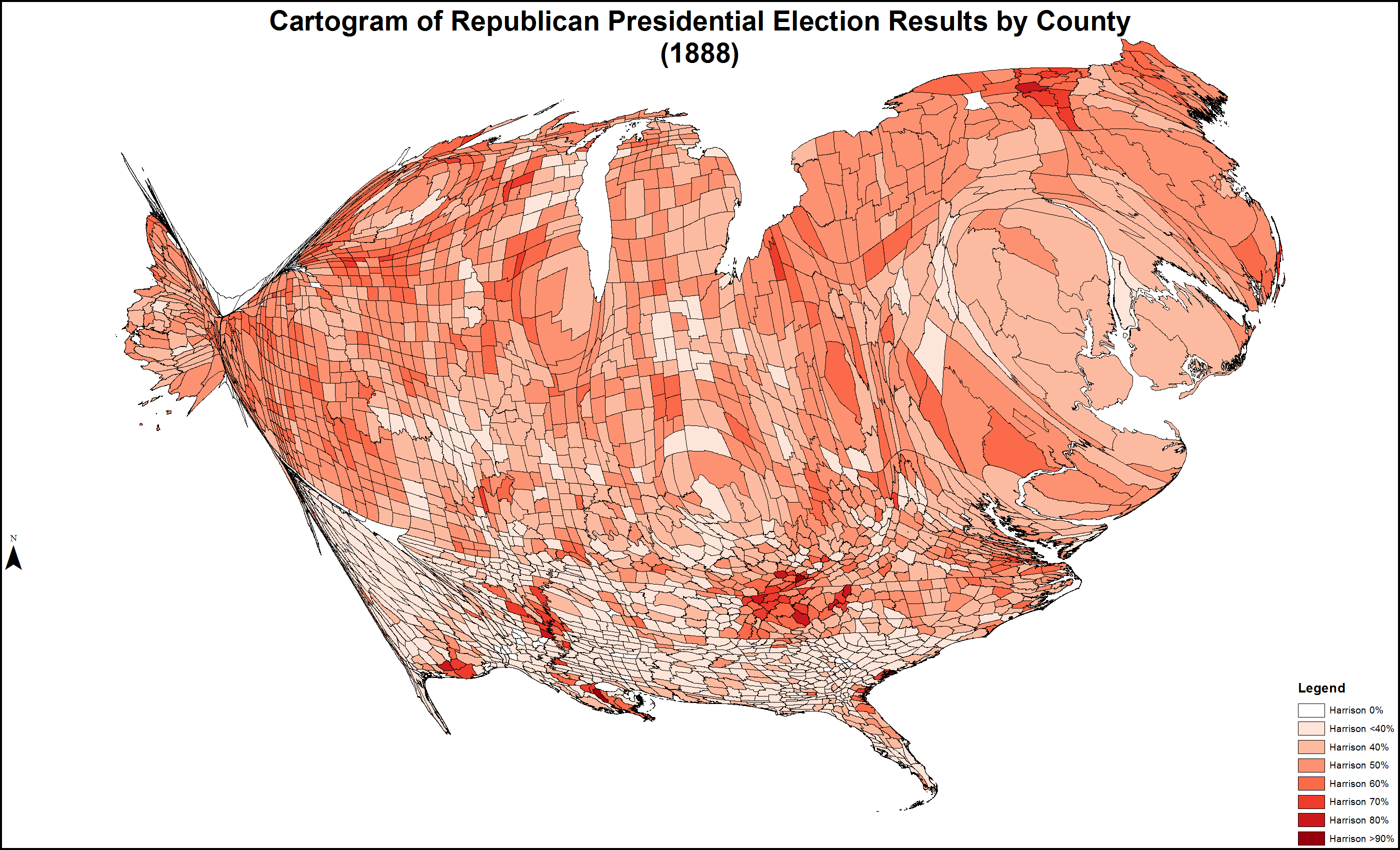
Cartogram of Republican presidential election results by county

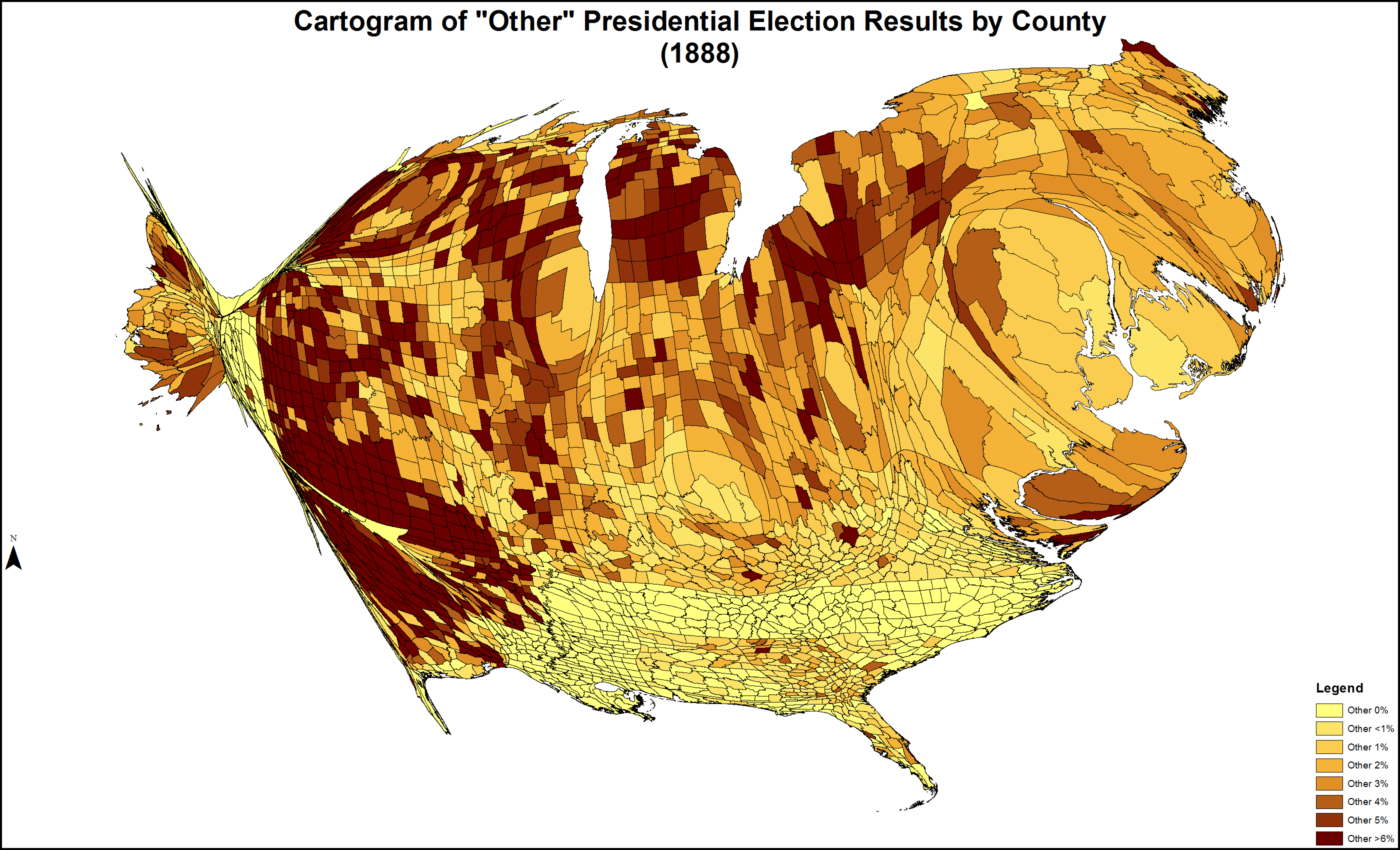
Cartogram of "other" presidential election results by county

=== Results by state ===
Source: Data from Walter Dean Burnham, Presidential ballots, 1836–1892 (Johns Hopkins University Press, 1955) pp 247–57.

States/districts won by Cleveland/Thurman
States/districts won by Harrison/Morton

		Grover Cleveland Democratic			Benjamin Harrison Republican			Clinton Fisk Prohibition			Alson Streeter Union Labor			Margin		State Total	
State	electoral votes	#	%	electoral votes	#	%	electoral votes	#	%	electoral votes	#	%	electoral votes	#	%	#	
Alabama	10	117,314	67.00	10	57,177	32.66	-	594	0.34	-	-	-	-	-60,137	-34.35	175,085	AL
Arkansas	7	86,062	54.80	7	59,752	38.04	-	614	0.39	-	10,630	6.77	-	-26,310	-16.75	157,058	AR
California	8	117,729	46.84	-	124,816	49.66	8	5,761	2.29	-	-	-	-	7,087	2.82	251,339	CA
Colorado	3	37,549	40.84	-	50,772	55.22	3	2,182	2.37	-	1,266	1.38	-	13,223	14.38	91,946	CO
Connecticut	6	74,920	48.66	6	74,584	48.44	-	4,234	2.75	-	240	0.16	-	-336	-0.22	153,978	CT
Delaware	3	16,414	55.15	3	12,950	43.51	-	399	1.34	-	-	-	-	-3,464	-11.64	29,764	DE
Florida	4	39,557	59.48	4	26,529	39.89	-	414	0.62	-	-	-	-	-13,028	-19.59	66,500	FL
Georgia	12	100,493	70.31	12	40,499	28.33	-	1,808	1.26	-	136	0.10	-	-59,994	-41.97	142,936	GA
Illinois	22	348,351	46.58	-	370,475	49.54	22	21,703	2.90	-	7,134	0.95	-	22,124	2.96	747,813	IL
Indiana	15	261,013	48.61	-	263,361	49.05	15	9,881	1.84	-	2,694	0.50	-	2,348	0.44	536,949	IN
Iowa	13	179,877	44.51	-	211,603	52.36	13	3,550	0.88	-	9,105	2.25	-	31,726	7.85	404,135	IA
Kansas	9	102,745	31.03	-	182,904	55.23	9	6,779	2.05	-	37,788	11.41	-	80,159	24.21	331,149	KS
Kentucky	13	183,830	53.30	13	155,138	44.98	-	5,223	1.51	-	677	0.20	-	-28,692	-8.32	344,868	KY
Louisiana	8	85,032	73.37	8	30,660	26.46	-	160	0.14	-	39	0.03	-	-54,372	-46.92	115,891	LA
Maine	6	50,472	39.35	-	73,730	57.49	6	2,691	2.10	-	1,344	1.05	-	23,258	18.13	128,253	ME
Maryland	8	106,188	50.34	8	99,986	47.40	-	4,767	2.26	-	-	-	-	-6,202	-2.94	210,941	MD
Massachusetts	14	151,590	44.04	-	183,892	53.42	14	8,701	2.53	-	-	-	-	32,302	9.38	344,243	MA
Michigan	13	213,469	44.91	-	236,387	49.73	13	20,945	4.41	-	4,555	0.96	-	22,918	4.82	475,356	MI
Minnesota	7	104,385	39.65	-	142,492	54.12	7	15,311	5.82	-	1,097	0.42	-	38,107	14.47	263,285	MN
Mississippi	9	85,451	73.80	9	30,095	25.99	-	240	0.21	-	-	-	-	-55,356	-47.81	115,786	MS
Missouri	16	261,943	50.24	16	236,252	45.31	-	4,539	0.87	-	18,626	3.57	-	-25,691	-4.93	521,360	MO
Nebraska	5	80,552	39.75	-	108,425	53.51	5	9,429	4.65	-	4,226	2.09	-	27,873	13.76	202,632	NE
Nevada	3	5,149	41.94	-	7,088	57.73	3	41	0.33	-	-	-	-	1,939	15.79	12,278	NV
New Hampshire	4	43,456	47.84	-	45,728	50.34	4	1,593	1.75	-	-	-	-	2,272	2.50	90,835	NH
New Jersey	9	151,508	49.87	9	144,360	47.52	-	7,933	2.61	-	-	-	-	-7,148	-2.35	303,801	NJ
New York	36	635,965	48.19	-	650,338	49.28	36	30,231	2.29	-	627	0.05	-	14,373	1.09	1,319,748	NY
North Carolina	11	147,902	51.79	11	134,784	47.20	-	2,840	0.99	-	-	-	-	-13,118	-4.59	285,563	NC
Ohio	23	396,455	47.18	-	416,054	49.51	23	24,356	2.90	-	3,496	0.42	-	19,599	2.33	840,361	OH
Oregon	3	26,522	42.88	-	33,291	53.82	3	1,677	2.71	-	-	-	-	6,769	10.94	61,853	OR
Pennsylvania	30	446,633	44.77	-	526,091	52.74	30	20,947	2.10	-	3,873	0.39	-	79,458	7.97	997,568	PA
Rhode Island	4	17,530	42.99	-	21,969	53.88	4	1,251	3.07	-	18	0.04	-	4,439	10.89	40,775	RI
South Carolina	9	65,824	82.28	9	13,736	17.17	-	-	-	-	-	-	-	-52,088	-65.11	79,997	SC
Tennessee	12	158,699	52.26	12	138,978	45.76	-	5,969	1.97	-	48	0.02	-	-19,721	-6.49	303,694	TN
Texas	13	234,883	65.70	13	88,422	24.73	-	4,749	1.33	-	29,459	8.24	-	-146,461	-40.97	357,513	TX
Vermont	4	16,788	25.65	-	45,192	69.05	4	1,460	2.23	-	1,977	3.02	-	28,404	43.40	65,452	VT
Virginia	12	152,004	49.99	12	150,399	49.46	-	1,684	0.55	-	-	-	-	-1,605	-0.53	304,087	VA
West Virginia	6	78,677	49.35	6	78,171	49.03	-	1,084	0.68	-	1,508	0.95	-	-506	-0.32	159,440	WV
Wisconsin	11	155,232	43.77	-	176,553	49.79	11	14,277	4.03	-	8,552	2.41	-	21,321	6.01	354,614	WI
TOTALS:	401	5,538,163	48.63	168	5,443,633	47.80	233	250,017	2.20	-	149,115	1.31	-	-94,530	-0.83	11,388,846	US

=== States that flipped from Democratic to Republican ===
- Indiana
- New York

=== Close states ===
Margin of victory less than 1% (39 electoral votes):

1. Connecticut, 0.22% (336 votes)
2. West Virginia, 0.32% (506 votes)
3. Indiana, 0.44% (2,348 votes)
4. Virginia, 0.53% (1,605 votes)

Margin of victory between 1% and 5% (150 electoral votes):

1. New York, 1.09% (14,373 votes) (tipping point state)
2. Ohio, 2.33% (19,599 votes)
3. New Jersey, 2.35% (7,148 votes)
4. New Hampshire, 2.50% (2,272 votes)
5. California, 2.82% (7,087 votes)
6. Maryland, 2.94% (6,202 votes)
7. Illinois, 2.96% (22,124 votes)
8. North Carolina, 4.59% (13,118 votes)
9. Michigan, 4.82% (22,918 votes)
10. Missouri, 4.93% (25,691 votes)

Margin of victory between 5% and 10% (93 electoral votes):

1. Wisconsin, 6.01% (21,321 votes)
2. Tennessee, 6.49% (19,721 votes)
3. Iowa, 7.85% (31,726 votes)
4. Pennsylvania, 7.97% (79,458 votes)
5. Kentucky, 8.32% (28,692 votes)
6. Massachusetts, 9.38% (32,302 votes)

== In popular culture ==
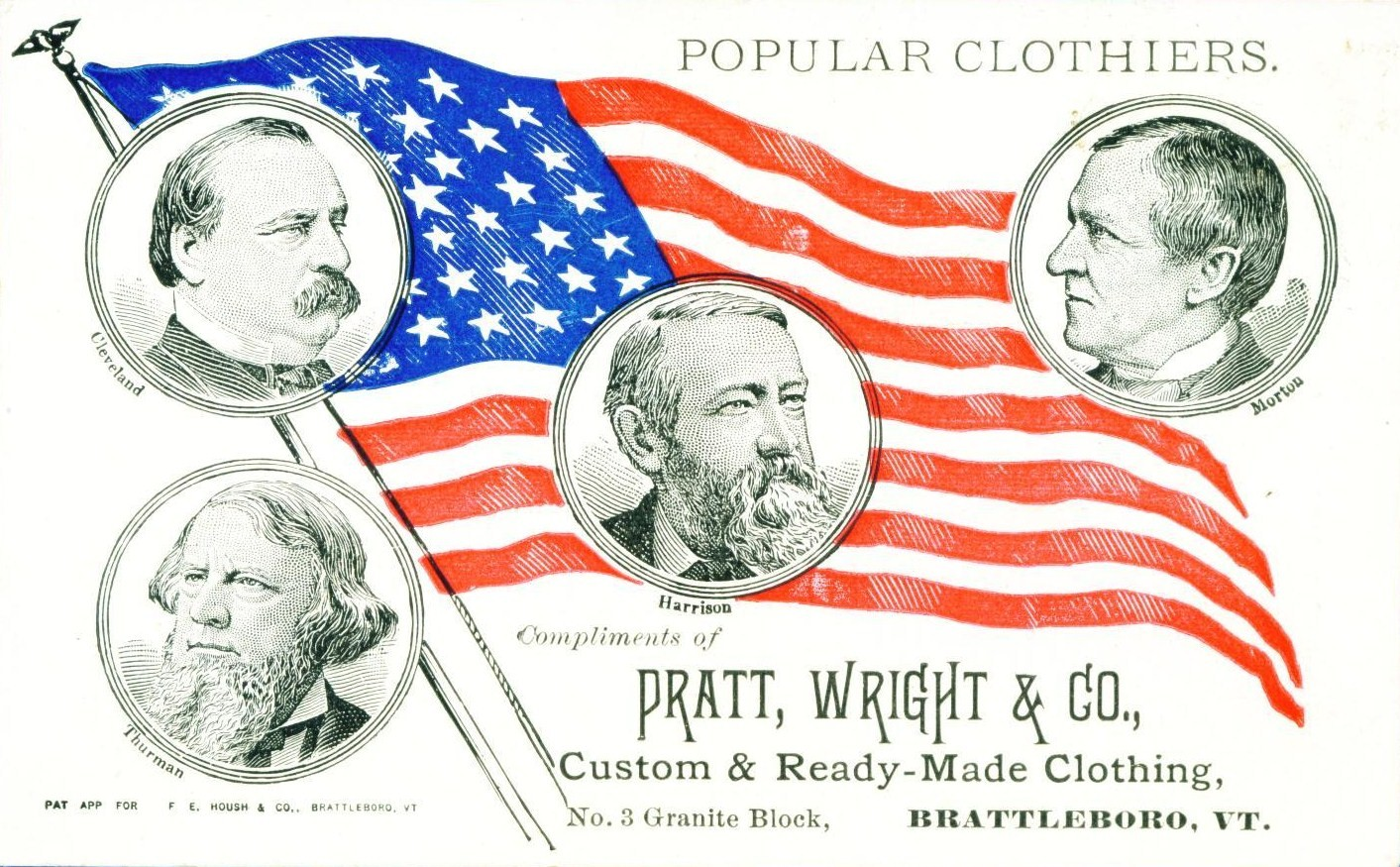
Business advertising card with an election theme

In 1968 the Michael P. Antoine Company produced the Walt Disney Company musical film The One and Only, Genuine, Original Family Band which centers on the election of 1888 and the annexing and subdividing of the Dakota Territory into states (which was a major issue of the election).

== See also ==
- American election campaigns in the 19th century
- History of the United States (1865–1918)
- 1888 United States House of Representatives elections
- 1888–89 United States Senate elections
- History of the United States Democratic Party
- History of the United States Republican Party
- Inauguration of Benjamin Harrison
- Third Party System

== Works cited ==
- Abramson, Paul; Aldrich, John; Rohde, David (1995). Change and Continuity in the 1992 Elections. CQ Press. ISBN 0871878399.
- Sherman, Richard (1973). The Republican Party and Black America From McKinley to Hoover 1896-1933. University of Virginia Press. ISBN 0813904676.
- Hild, Matthew (2015). "The Knights of Labor and the Third-Party Movement in Texas, 1886–1896". The Southwestern Historical Quarterly. 119 (1). Texas State Historical Association: 24–43. doi:10.2307/447112. JSTOR 24388910.
