= Grover Cleveland presidential campaign =

Grover Cleveland, the 22nd and 24th President of the United States, ran for president thrice:

- Grover Cleveland 1884 presidential campaign, a successful election campaign resulting in him being elected the 22nd president of the United States, with Thomas A. Hendricks as running mate
- Grover Cleveland 1888 presidential campaign, an unsuccessful re-election campaign, with Allen G. Thurman as running mate
- Grover Cleveland 1892 presidential campaign, a successful election campaign resulting in him being elected the 24th president of the United States on a second non-consecutive term for the first time in the United States history, with Adlai Stevenson I as running mate
