= Idus L. Fielder =

He is a well known lawyer

Idus L. Fielder (September 21, 1853 - 1892) was a lawyer and state legislator. He served in the Arkansas House of Representatives in 1883 representing Franklin County, Arkansas. In 1883, he moved to New Mexico for breathing issues and in 1886 he was admitted to the New Mexico Bar from Silver City.

He was born in Georgia. He graduated from the University of Virginia and the University of Georgia Law School. In 1877 he moved to Ozark, Arkansas and partnered with his brother C. C. Fielder doing legal work. He married Maid Clegg of Van Buren, Arkansas September 21, 1881. He moved to Deming, New Mexico in 1883 while suffering health issies and then to Silver City, New Mexico two years later. He had a son and employed "colored servant" who was caring for him at the time of his death.

In 1869, he was a charter member of the Kappa Alpha Order fraternity's Epsilon grouping. In 1881 he was a practicing lawyer in Arkansas.

He served on the Committee on Judiciary.

A Democrat he was part of the 1892 Democratic National Convention. He represented Ada Hulmes in her high-profile murder defense.
