= 1888 Democratic National Convention =

U.S. political event held in St. Louis, Missouri

- 1888 presidential election
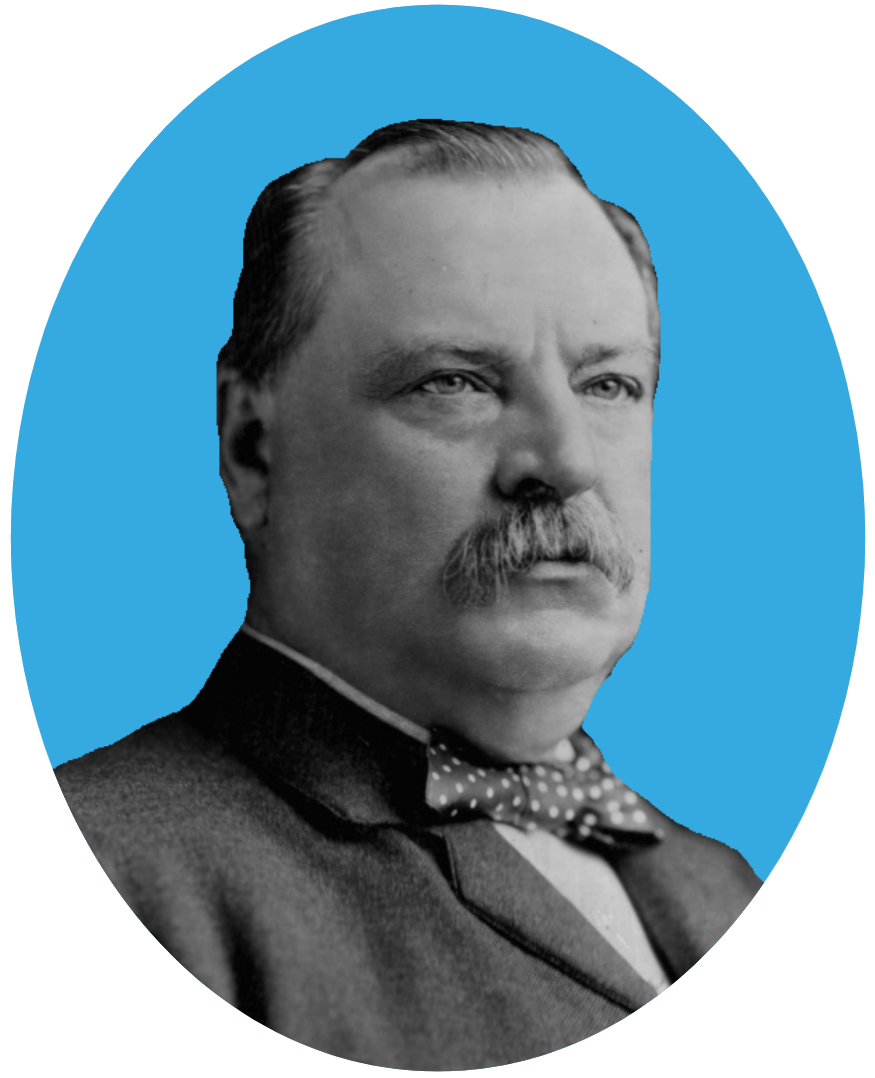
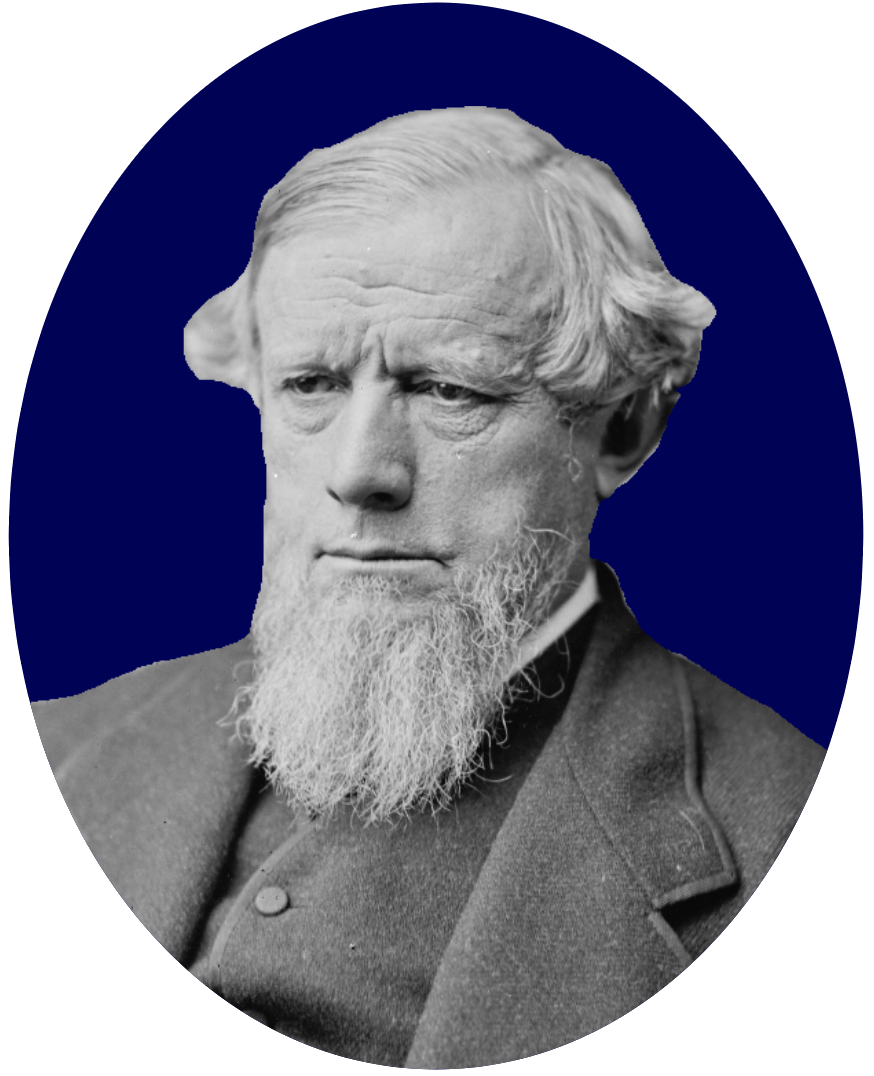
- Nominees; Cleveland and Thurman

Convention
- Date(s): June 5–7, 1888
- City: St. Louis, Missouri
- Venue: Exposition Building

Candidates
- Presidential nominee: Grover Cleveland of New York
- Vice-presidential nominee: Allen G. Thurman of Ohio

The 1888 Democratic National Convention was a nominating convention held June 5 to 7, 1888, in the St. Louis Exposition and Music Hall in St. Louis, Missouri. It nominated President Grover Cleveland for reelection and former Senator Allen G. Thurman of Ohio for vice president.

St. Louis won the convention after a presentation in February 1888.

== Proceedings ==
Stephen M. White served as temporary chairman and Patrick A. Collins served as the convention's permanent president.

== Platform ==
The Democratic platform largely confined itself to a defense of the Cleveland administration, supporting reduction in the tariff and taxes generally as well as statehood for the western territories.

== Presidential nomination ==
=== Presidential candidates ===
President
Grover Cleveland
of New York

President Cleveland was renominated by acclamation. An event few could directly remember, as the last time a Democrat was renominated was 48 years earlier, in 1840. Presidents Franklin Pierce and Andrew Johnson lost the nomination in 1856 and 1868 respectively, and Presidents James K. Polk and James Buchanan refused to run for a second term.

== Vice Presidential nomination ==
=== Vice Presidential candidates ===
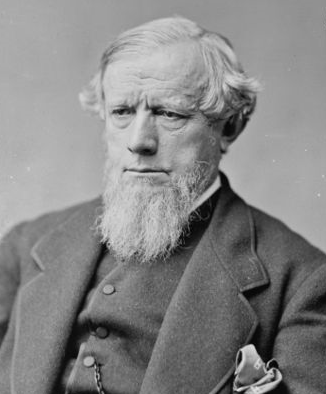
Former Senator Allen G. Thurman of Ohio

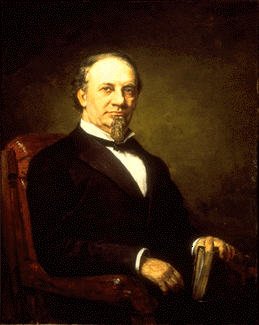
Governor Isaac P. Gray of Indiana

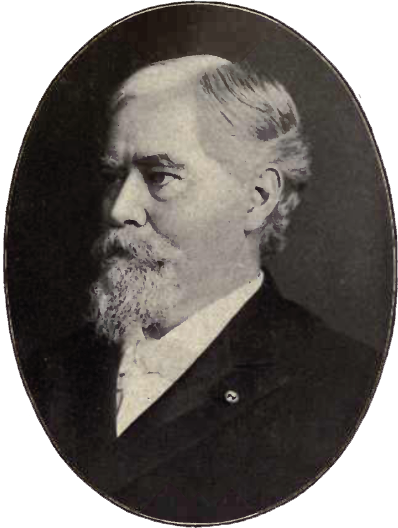
U.S. Commissioner of Pensions John C. Black of Illinois

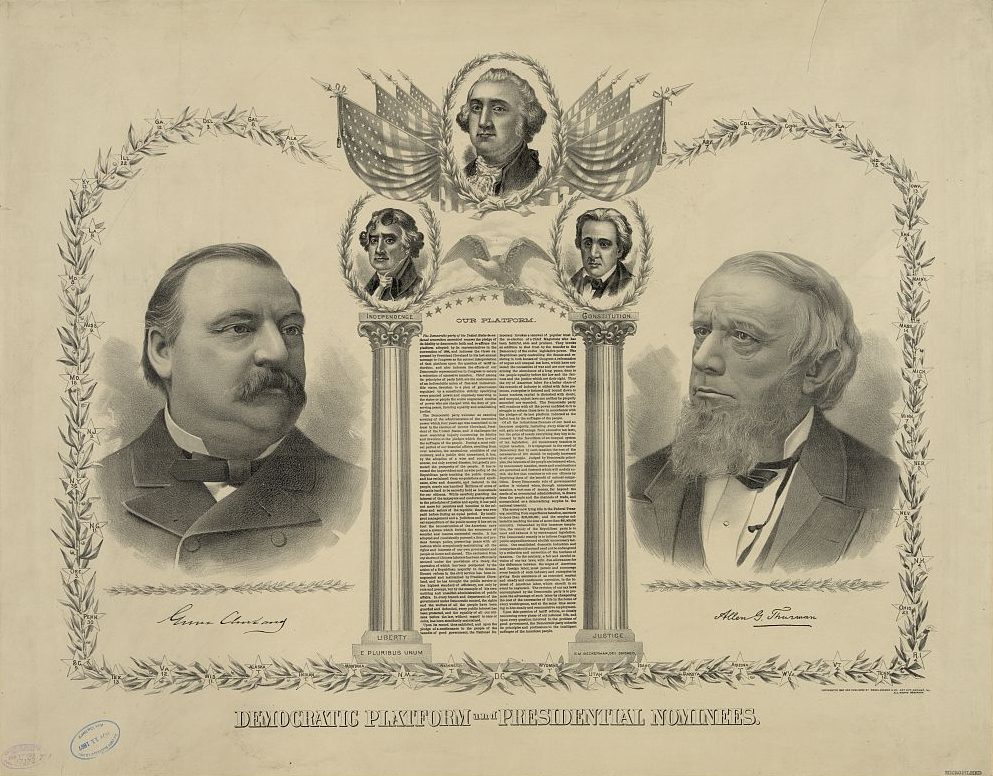
Cleveland/Thurman campaign poster

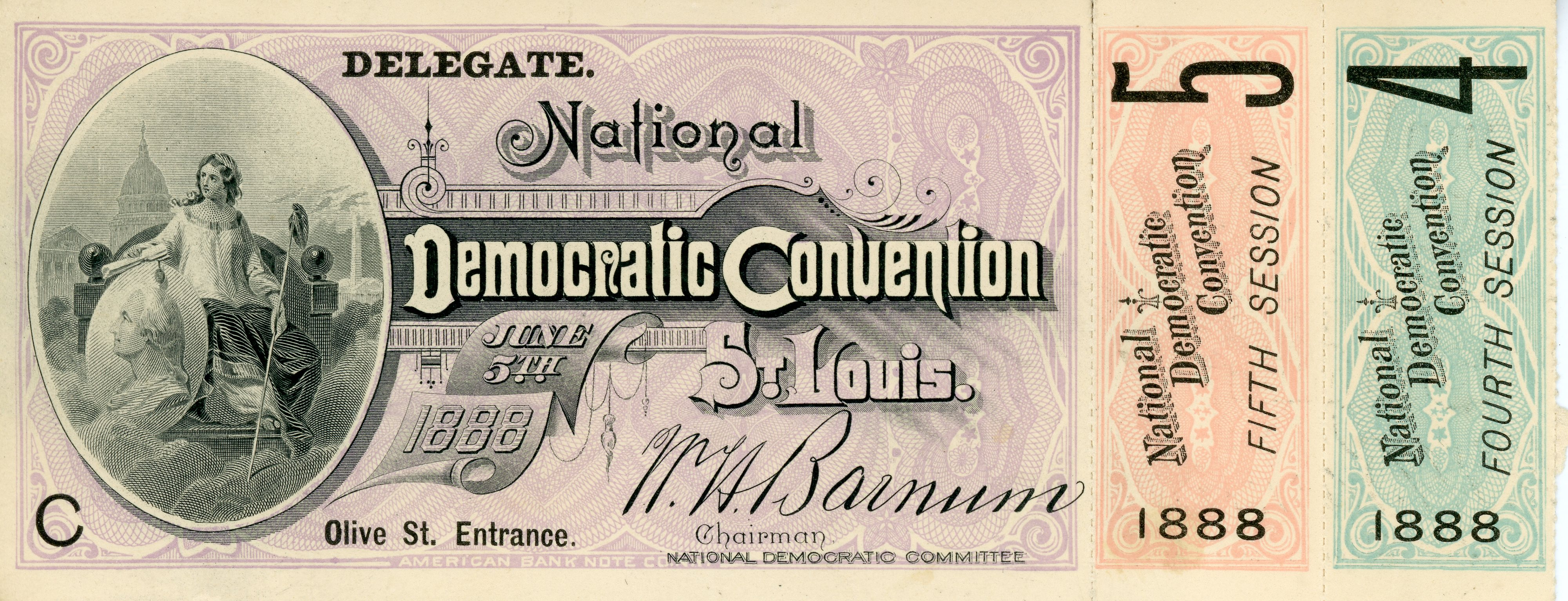
Delegate ticket

After Cleveland was re-nominated, Democrats had to choose a replacement for Thomas A. Hendricks, who had died in office on November 25, 1885. Hendricks had run unsuccessfully as the Democratic nominee for vice-president in 1876, but had won the office when he ran again with Cleveland in 1884.

Three names were placed in nomination: Allen G. Thurman, Isaac P. Gray, and John C. Black. Former Senator Thurman of Ohio was nominated for vice-president over Indiana Governor Gray, his nearest rival, and John C. Black, who trailed behind. Gray lost the nomination to Thurman primarily because his enemies brought up his actions while a Republican.

Vice Presidential Ballot
Candidate	1st	Acclamation
Thurman	684	822
Gray	101	
Black	36	
Not Voting	1	

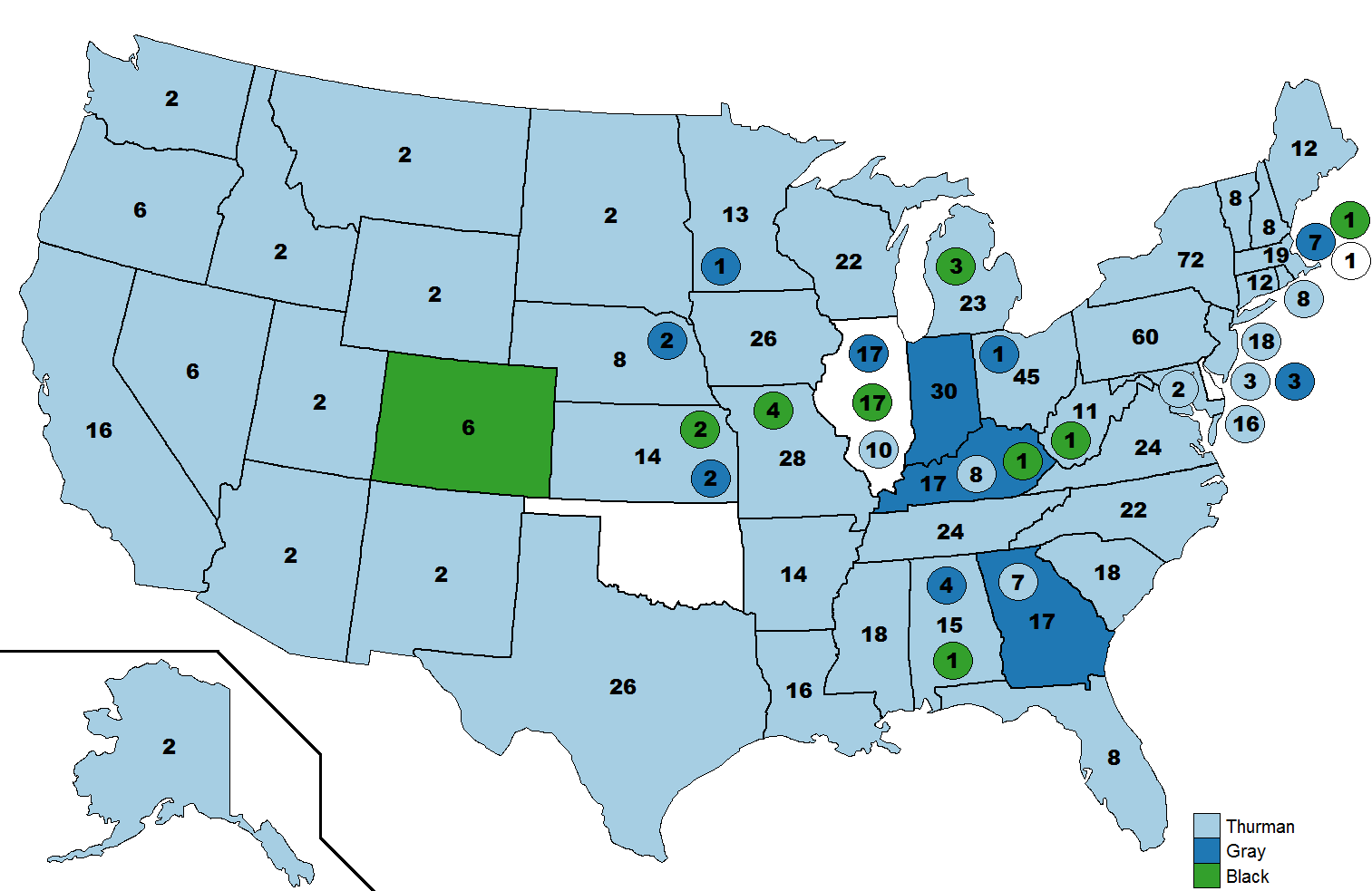
1st Vice Presidential Ballot

== See also ==
- History of the United States Democratic Party
- Grover Cleveland 1888 presidential campaign
- 1888 United States presidential election
- U.S. presidential nomination convention
- List of Democratic National Conventions
- 1888 Republican National Convention

Preceded by 1884; Chicago, Illinois	Democratic National Conventions	Succeeded by 1892; Chicago, Illinois
