= St. Louis Exposition and Music Hall =

Former indoor venue

Coordinates: 38.629829°N 90.199063°W

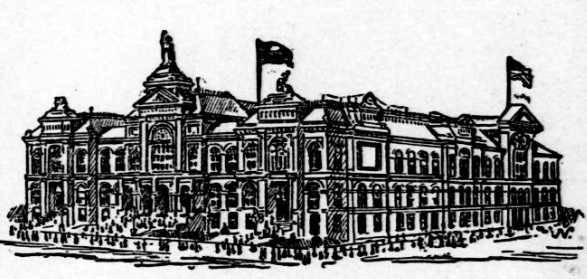
1888 illustration

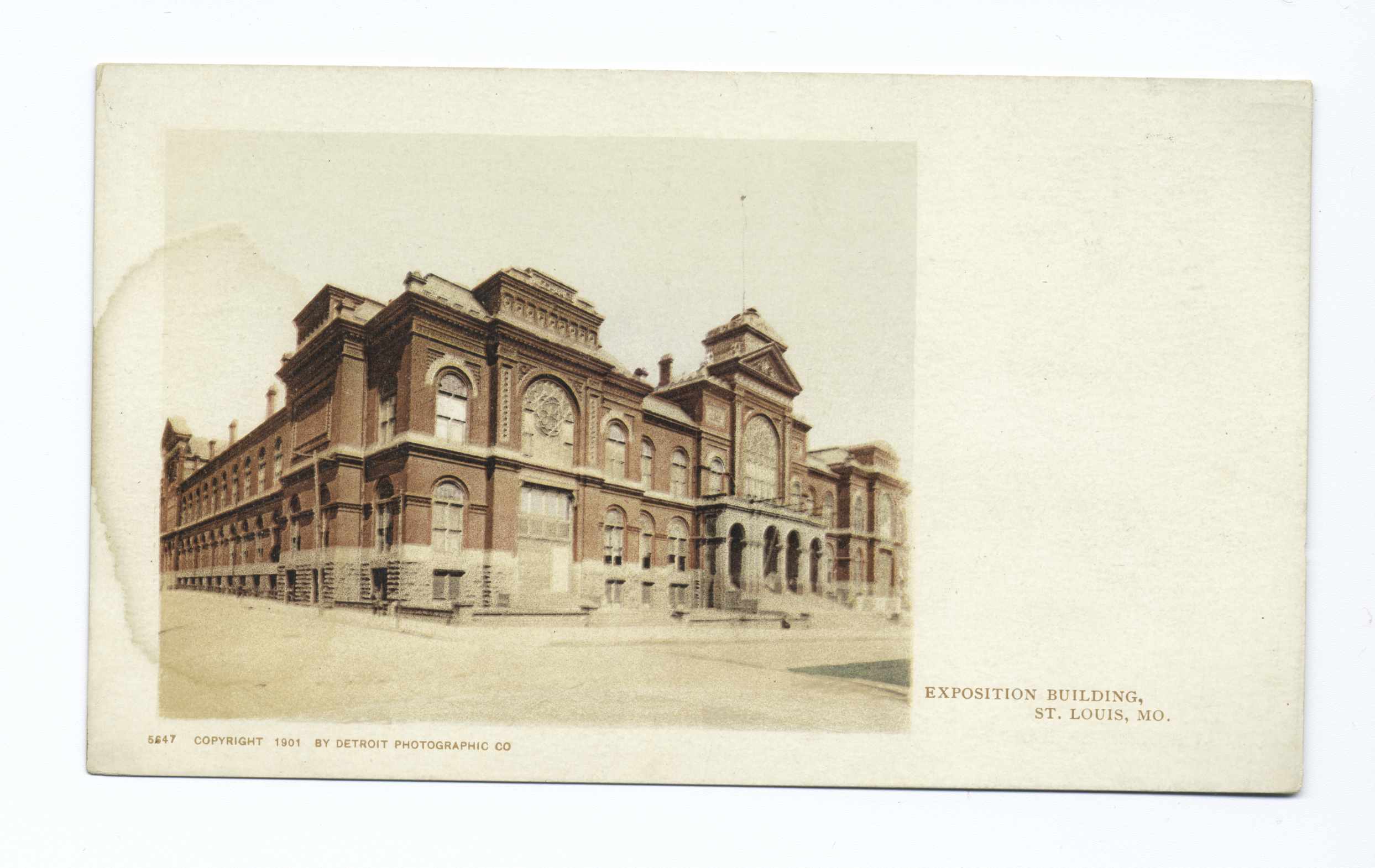
1901 postcard

St. Louis Exposition and Music Hall was an indoor exposition hall, music hall and arena in St. Louis, Missouri from 1883 to 1907.

Three national presidential nominating conventions were held in three separate buildings in or near the complex between 1888 and 1904 including the 1888 Democratic National Convention, 1896 Republican National Convention, and 1904 Democratic National Convention. In addition to the 1904 Democratic convention, it was used as a large venue for other conventions and congresses during the 1904 World's Fair.

The 502 by 332 ft (153 by 101 m) exposition hall was built initially at a cost of $750,000. It was designed by Jerome Bibb Legg and completed in 1884. Legg's most prominent extant building is Academic Hall at Southeast Missouri State University.

Originally built to house the St. Louis Exposition, an annual fair, it covered 6 acres (2.4 ha) at Olive and 13th Streets and was one of the first buildings in the country to have electric lights.

The Music Hall, which was a home for the St. Louis Symphony, had a stage which could accommodate 1,500 people and claimed to be one of the world's largest. Its seating capacity was 3,500.

In the winter of 1896 the Republican National Convention planned to be in a rebuilt permanent building in the center. However, it was determined that it would not be ready in time for the convention so a temporary wooden convention was erected on the lawn south of City Hall (three blocks south of the Exposition Hall). The temporary structure was erected within sixty days at cost of $60,000 including decorations.

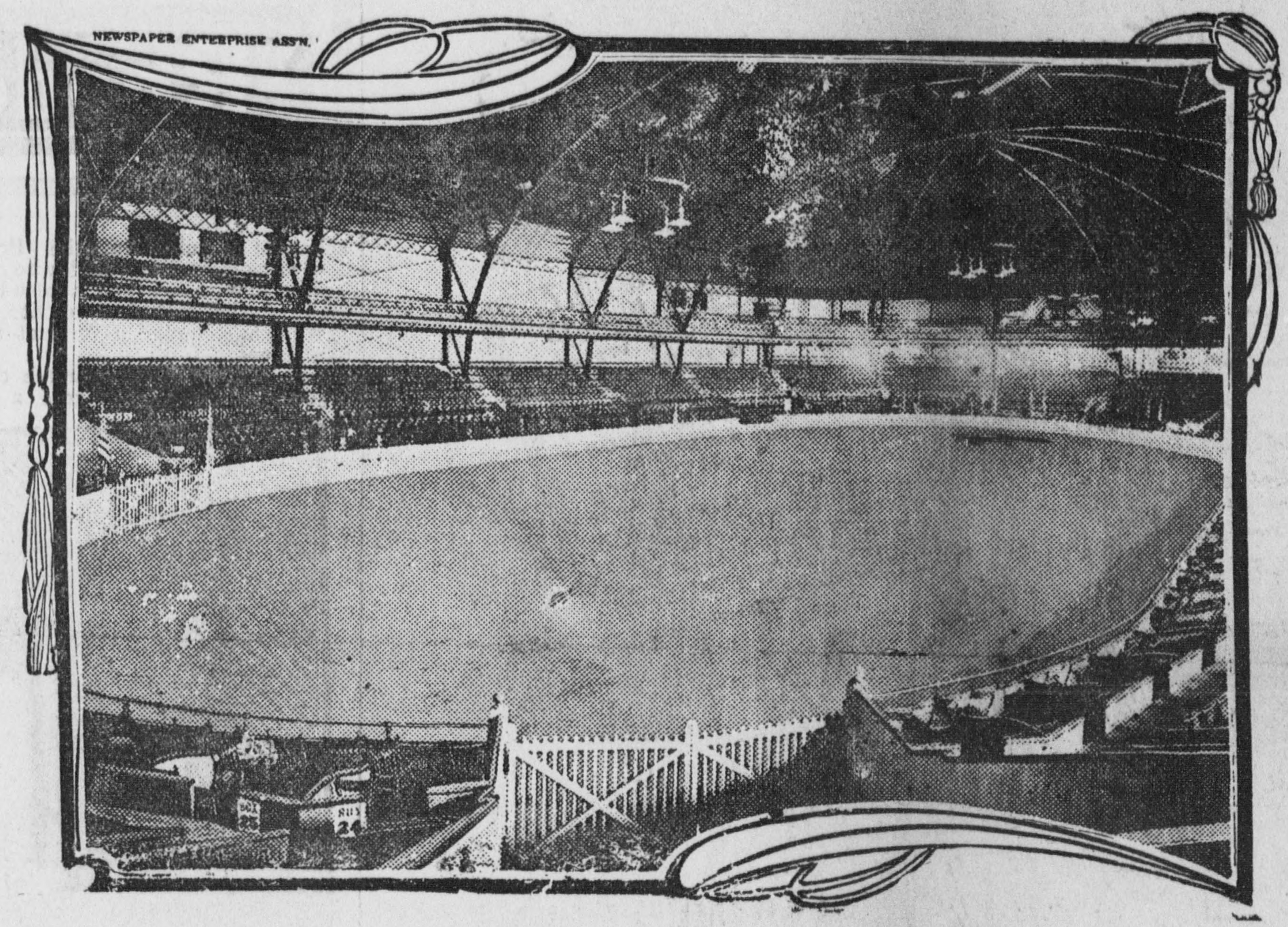
Arena/convention hall in 1904

Following the 1896 Convention, the temporary structure as well as the Exposition building were torn down and a new Coliseum was built on the site of the Exposition Building. The new Coliseum had an arena of 112 by 222 ft (68 m) with an 84 ft (26 m) ceiling. It had a single span trussed roof, with no columns or obstructions. The seating capacity was 7,000 but could be expanded to 12,000. It was rated at 10,500 for its 1904 convention.

The whole structure including the new Coliseum and Music Hall were torn down in 1907 when the St. Louis Central Library was built at its location and the new St. Louis Coliseum was constructed.
