= 1892 Democratic National Convention =

U.S. political event held in Chicago, Illinois

- 1892 presidential election
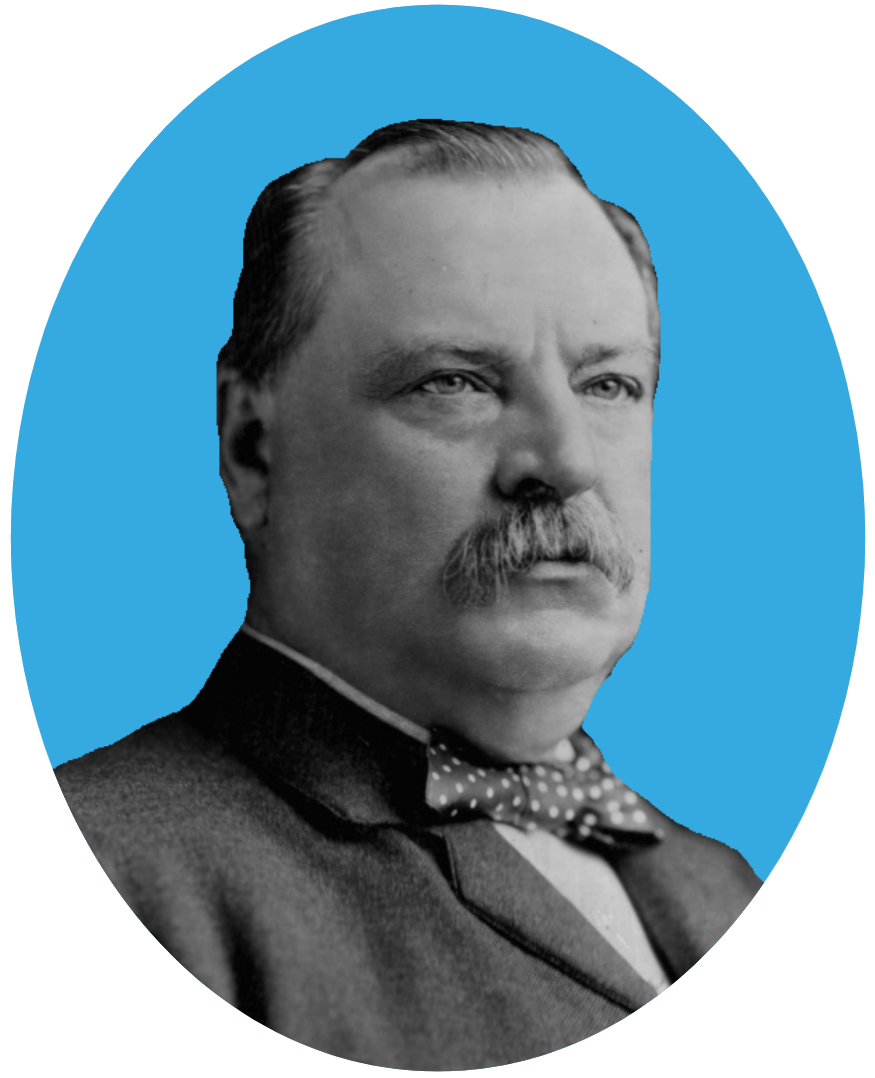
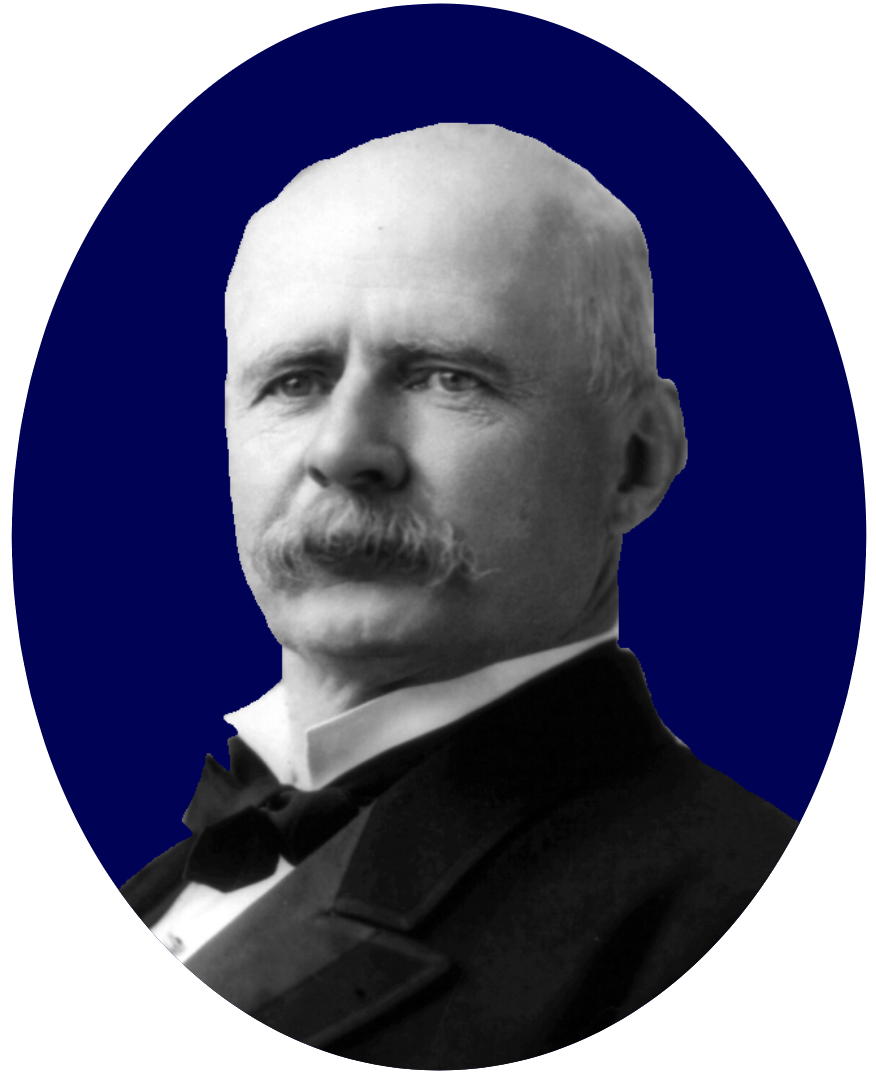
- Nominees; Cleveland and Stevenson

Convention
- Date(s): June 21–23, 1892
- City: Chicago, Illinois
- Venue: The Wigwam

Candidates
- Presidential nominee: Grover Cleveland of New York
- Vice-presidential nominee: Adlai Stevenson I of Illinois

The 1892 Democratic National Convention was held in Chicago, Illinois, from June 21 to 23, 1892. Former President Grover Cleveland, who had been the party's standard-bearer in 1884 and 1888, was nominated again. Adlai Stevenson I of Illinois was nominated for vice president. The ticket was victorious in the general election, defeating the Republican nominees, President Benjamin Harrison and his running mate, Whitelaw Reid.

== Preconvention ==
David B. Hill, a U.S. Senator who had served as Cleveland's lieutenant governor, won the support of the New York delegation at the state convention on February 22, 1892. Hill rose to the governorship after Cleveland's election to the presidency in 1884, and won reelection despite Cleveland losing New York in 1888. Hill's presidential ambitions were supported by Tammany Hall. He conducted a tour of the south in an attempt to gain its support. Hill's tour was regarded as a failure. Henry Watterson, editor of the Louisville Courier Journal, wrote that his tour was "imprudent and ill-started" and that his movement had "nothing beneath it".

Anti-Hill Democrats in New York unsuccessfully tried to postpone the state convention. After failing to stop the convention, they called their own convention to be held in Syracuse on May 31 in order to send a competing delegation. They formed the Democratic State Provisional Committee and unveiled 120,000 signatures in favor of their convention.

The California, Indiana, Michigan, Minnesota, New Jersey, North Dakota, Pennsylvania, Washington, and Wisconsin parties bound their delegations to Cleveland. Connecticut, Maine, Nebraska, and Vermont sent uninstructed delegations that were sympathetic to Cleveland. New Hampshire's delegation was sent without instruction due to a close division between the Cleveland and Hill forces, but the delegation endorsed Cleveland on May 11. Colorado, New Mexico, and Wyoming sent uninstructed delegations that were sympathetic to Hill. Indiana committed its delegation to Cleveland, but instructed it to support Isaac P. Gray should Cleveland fail.

South Carolina was the only southern state to oppose Cleveland. Kentucky endorsed Cleveland's administration and sent an uninstructed delegation. Virginia sent a delegation composed of 12 Cleveland delegates, 10 Hill delegates, and 2 uncommitted. Georgia sent a delegation with 20 Cleveland supporters and 6 Hill supporters. Tennessee and Texas bound their delegates to Cleveland.

A resolution at the Colorado convention calling for the delegation to only support free silver presidential and vice presidential was tabled. William Jennings Bryan unsuccessfully proposed a free silver plank at the Nebraska convention. Bryan opposed Cleveland and instead supported Boies.

Horace Boies, James E. Campbell, John G. Carlisle, Roswell P. Flower, Gorman, John R. McPherson, John M. Palmer, William E. Russell, William F. Vilas, and Watterson were put forward as dark horse candidates. Watterson supported Carlisle, who supported Cleveland.

== Convention ==
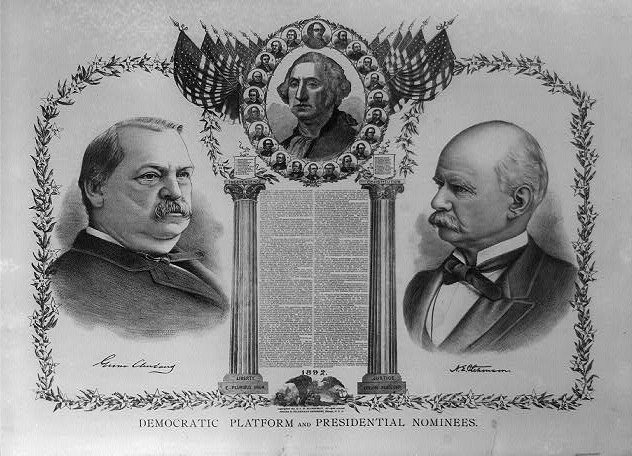
Cleveland/Stevenson campaign poster

The Democratic National Committee met on January 21, 1892, to select a city to host the national convention. Chicago was selected as the host of the convention on the 15th ballot. Hill's supporters, including Calvin S. Brice and Arthur P. Gorman, wanted Chicago selected. At the convention William Claiborne Owens was temporary chairman before William Lyne Wilson was made permanent chair; both men were Cleveland supporters.

Hill's supporters focused on preventing Cleveland from receiving two-thirds of the delegate vote. Richard Croker, William F. Sheehan, and Edward Murphy Jr. were the leaders of Hill's campaign. Wilson S. Bissell, D-Cady Herrick, Francis Lynde Stetson, and William Collins Whitney led Cleveland's campaign with Whitney as its manager. Cleveland's campaign established a headquarters at the Palmer House on June 17.

Whitney convinced Gorman to abandon Hill, who Gorman saw as no longer being able to win the nomination, and instead support Cleveland. Indiana U.S. Senator Daniel W. Voorhees, a former Hill supporter, ended his attempt to push Gray's nomination and gave his support to Cleveland. Palmer was able to prevent support for William Ralls Morrison rising and brought the Illinois delegation behind Cleveland.

The New York delegation maintained its support for Hill in a letter signed by 71 of its 72 delegates, with Albany Mayor James Hilton Manning refusing. The anti-Hill New York delegation decided to not push a credentials fight due to a lack of support from Cleveland and Whitney not wanting to divide the party.

The Montana delegation attempted to unify the free silver states in opposition to Cleveland.

By the end of Harrison's term, many Americans were ready to return to Cleveland's hard money policy on the currency question. As Democrats convened in Chicago from June 8–June 11, 1892, Cleveland was the frontrunner, but faced formidable opposition. He had come out against the free coinage of silver, thereby earning the enmity of Western and Southern Democrats. Cleveland's cause was aided by his position on the tariff, his perceived electability, a strong organization, and the weakness of his rivals' candidacies.

Cleveland was nominated by Leon Abbett and was seconded by the California delegation. Hill was nominated by William C. DeWitt and seconded by John R. Fellows; both were New York delegates. Boies was nominated by John F. Duncombe and seconded by Watterson. Cleveland won on the first ballot with 617.33 votes, ten more than the required two-thirds.

Presidential Ballot
| | 1st | Unanimous |
|---|---|---|
| Cleveland | 617.33 | 910 |
| Hill | 114 | |
| Boies | 103 | |
| Gorman | 36.5 | |
| Stevenson | 16.67 | |
| Carlisle | 14 | |
| Morrison | 3 | |
| Campbell | 2 | |
| Pattison | 1 | |
| Russell | 1 | |
| Whitney | 1 | |
| Not Voting | 0.5 | |

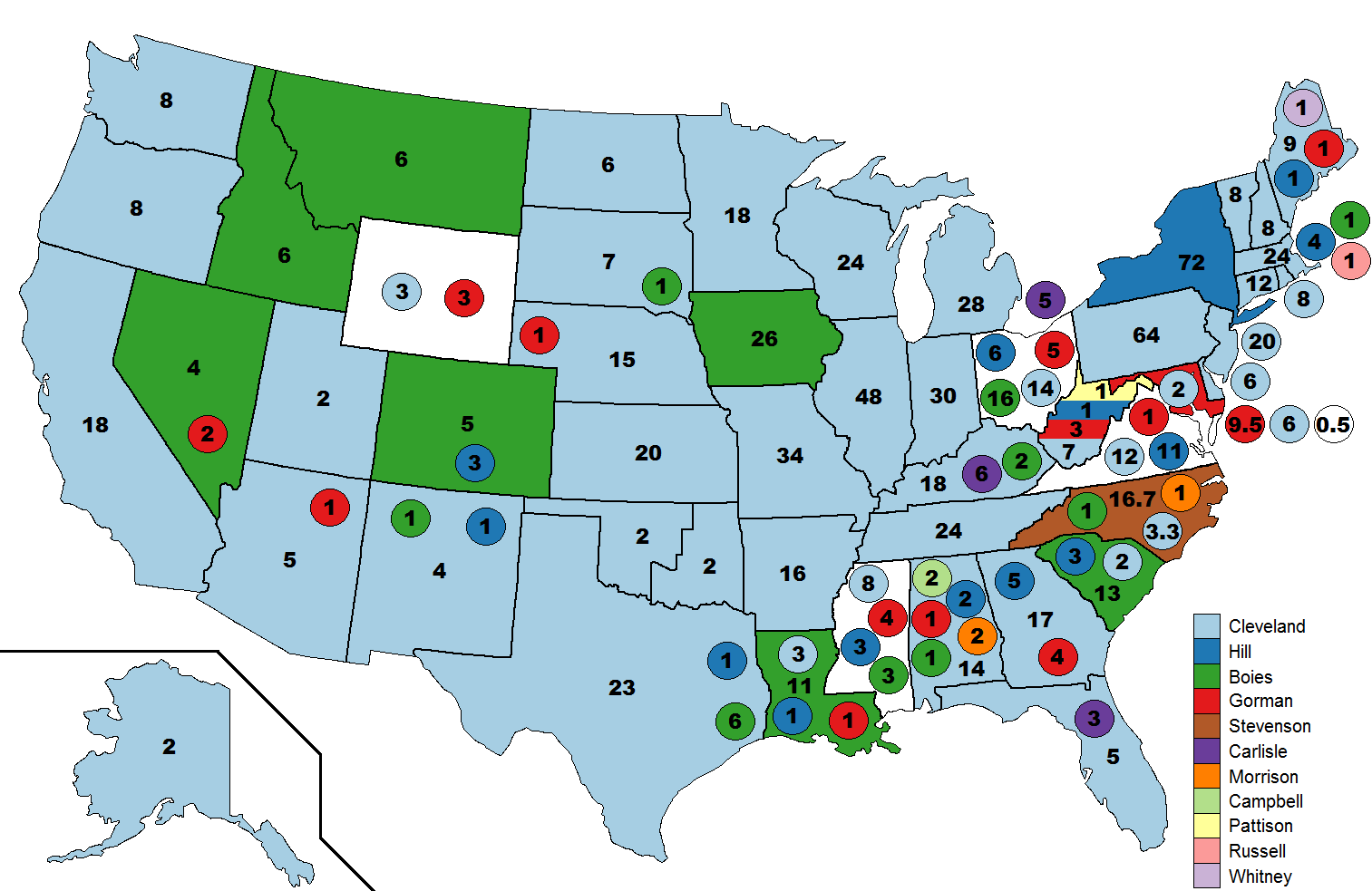
1st Presidential Ballot

=== Vice presidential nomination ===
Allen G. Thurman, Cleveland's running mate in 1888, supported Cleveland for president in 1892, but was not a candidate for vice president.

Gray was nominated by John E. Lamb. Gray's candidacy was weakened by his prior opposition to Cleveland, his past as a Republican, and the belief that Cleveland would carry Indiana in the election no matter what. Walter Q. Gresham suggested to Whitney and Thomas F. Bayard that somebody from Illinois should be selected to help Cleveland win it. Adlai Stevenson I was nominated by the Illinois delegation.

Stevenson finished ahead of Gray on the first ballot. Revised first ballot totals gave Stevenson enough votes to obtain the nomination, after which delegates made the selection unanimous.

Vice Presidential Ballot
| | 1st (Before Shifts) | 1st (After Shifts) | Unanimous |
|---|---|---|---|
| Stevenson | 402 | 652 | 910 |
| Gray | 343 | 185 | |
| Morse | 86 | 62 | |
| Mitchell | 45 | 10 | |
| Watterson | 26 | 0 | |
| Cockran | 5 | 0 | |
| Boies | 1 | 0 | |
| Tree | 1 | 0 | |
| Not Voting | 1 | 1 | |

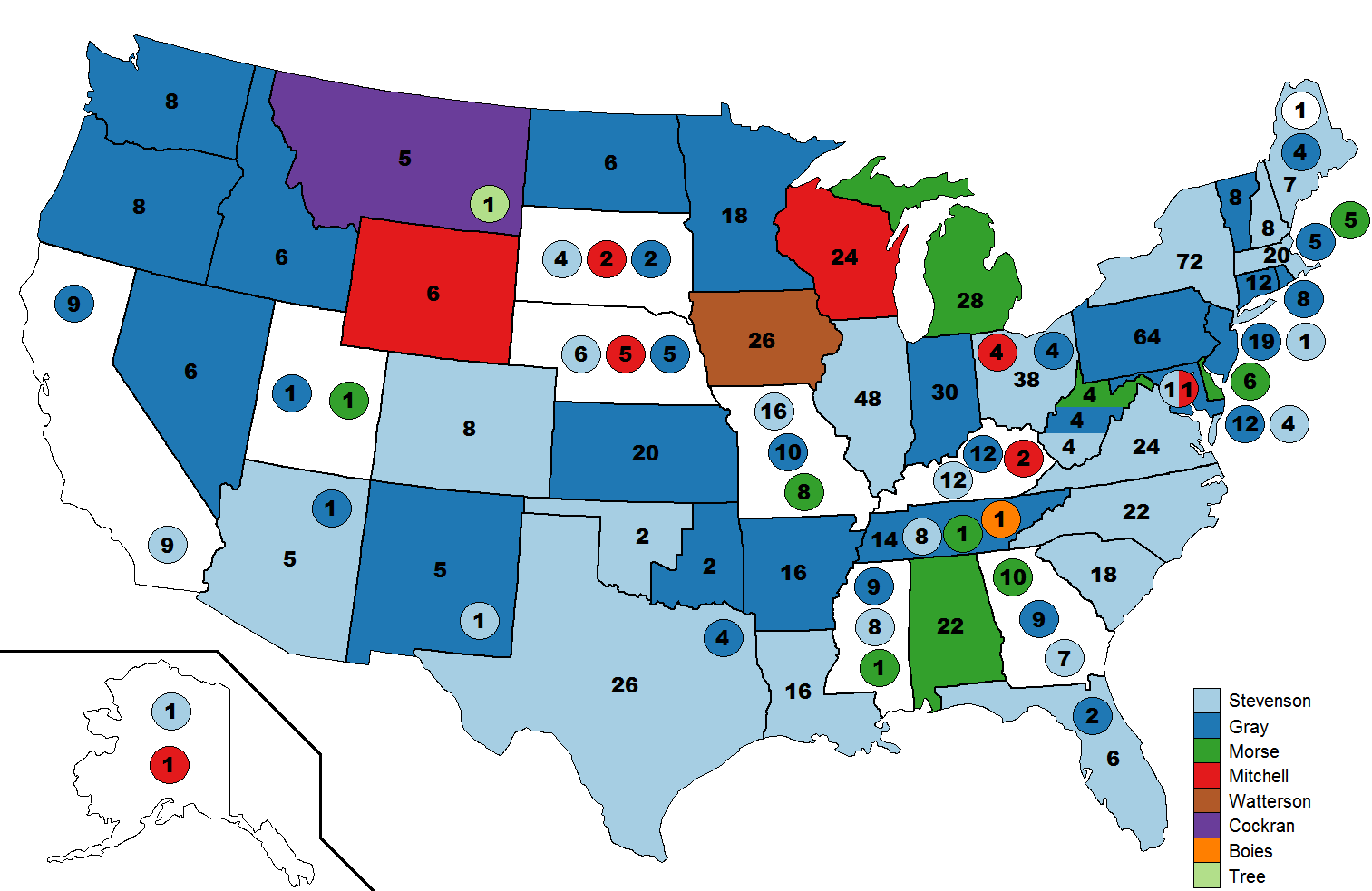
1st Vice Presidential Ballot Before Shifts

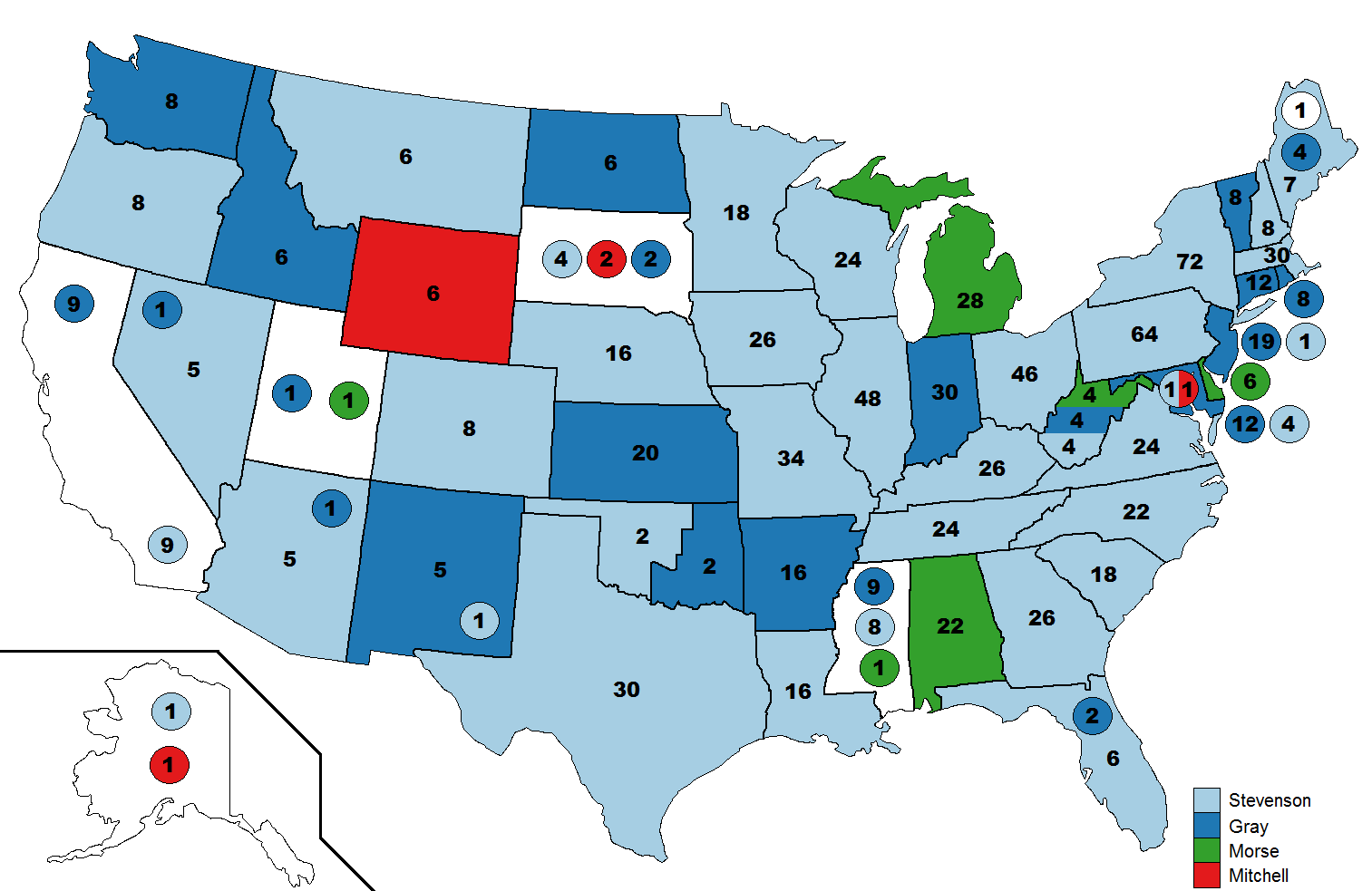
1st Vice Presidential Ballot After Shifts

== Platform ==
The 1892 convention adopted a platform:

- endorsing "a return to [Jeffersonian and Madisonian] fundamental principles of free popular government, based on home rule and individual liberty"
- opposing "Federal control of elections, to which the Republican party has committed itself"
- opposing "the Republican policy of profligate expenditure"
- denouncing "Republican protection as fraud" and declaring it "a fundamental principle of the Democratic party that the Federal Government has no constitutional power to impose and collect tariff duties, except for the purpose of revenue only"
- denouncing the McKinley Tariff as "the culminating atrocity of class legislation" and endorsing ongoing efforts to modify or repeal it
- denouncing the tariff's effect on agricultural surplus and mortgage rates in the West
- denouncing "the sham reciprocity" which "pretend[s] to establish closer trade relations for a country whose articles of export are almost exclusively agricultural products with other countries that are also agricultural, while erecting a custom=house barrier of prohibitive tariff taxes against the richest countries of the world that stand ready to take our entire surplus of products, and to exchange therefor commodities which are necessaries and comforts of life among our own people"
- demanding enforcement of the laws made to prevent and control "the Trusts and Combinations, which are designed to enable capital to secure more than its just share of the joint product of Capital and Labor, a natural consequence of the prohibitive taxes" and further legislation "in restraint of their abuses as experience may show to be necessary"
- reaffirming the 1876 declaration in favor of "reform of the civil service" and denouncing the recent Republican convention as "a scandalous satire upon free popular institutions and a startling illustration of the methods by which a President may gratify his ambition" in which Benjamin Harrison was re-nominated "by delegations composed largely of his appointees, holding office at his pleasure"
- pledging to continue the policy of reclaiming public lands "to be sacredly held as homesteads for our citizens"
- denouncing the Sherman Silver Purchase Act as "a cowardly makeshift" and holding in favor of:
  - "the use of both gold and silver as the standard money of the country"
  - "the coinage of both gold and silver without discriminating against either metal or charge for mintage, but the dollar unit of coinage of both metals must be of equal intrinsic and exchangeable value, or be adjusted through international agreement or by such safeguards of legislation as shall insure the maintenance of the parity of the two metals and the equal power of every dollar at all times in the markets and in the payment of debts"
  - "that all paper currency shall be kept at par with and redeemable in such coin"
  - any monetary policy necessary to protect farmers and laborers, "the first and most defenseless victims of unstable money and fluctuating currency"
- recommending the repeal of the 10% tax on state banknotes
- recognizing "the World's Columbian Exposition as a national undertaking of vast importance and calling on Congress to "make such necessary financial provision as shall be requisite to the maintenance of the national honor and public faith"
- condemning the "oppression practised by the Russian Government upon its Lutheran and Jewish subjects" and demanding the President act "to bring about a cessation of these cruel persecutions"
- tendering "profound and earnest sympathy to those lovers of freedom who are struggling for home rule and the great cause of local self-government in Ireland"
- opposing "all sumptuary laws, as an interference with the individual rights of the citizen"
- favoring legislation "abolishing the notorious sweating system, for abolishing contract convict labor, and for prohibiting the employment in factories of children under 15 years of age"
- calling for legislation "to protect the lives and limbs of railway employees and those of other hazardous transportation companies" and denouncing Republicans for blocking such legislation
- calling on the Government to "care for and improve the Mississippi River and other great waterways of the Republic, so as to secure for the interior States easy and cheap transportation to tide water"
- recognizing construction of the Nicaragua Canal as "of great importance to the United States"
- approving "all legitimate efforts to prevent the United States from being used as the dumping ground for the known criminals and professional paupers of Europe" and demanding "rigid enforcement of the laws against Chinese immigration and the importation of foreign workmen under contract" but condemning and denouncing "any and all attempts to restrict the immigration of the industrious and worthy of foreign lands"
- recommending "most liberal appropriations for the public schools" at the state level and opposing "State interference with parental rights and rights of conscience in the education of children"
- favoring "the maintenance of a navy strong enough for all purposes of national defense, to properly maintain the honor and dignity of this country abroad"
- renewing "the expression of appreciation of the patriotism of the soldiers and sailors of the Union in the war for its preservation" and favoring "just and liberal pensions for all disabled Union soldiers, their widows and dependents" but demanding impartial, honest, and industrious distribution of pensions and denouncing the Pension Office under Harrison as "incompetent, corrupt, disgraceful and dishonest"
- "view[ing] with alarm the tendency to a policy of irritation and bluster which is liable at any time to confront us with the alternatives of humiliation or war"
- approving the admission of the Territories of New Mexico and Arizona as states
- holding that the "officials appointed to administer the government of any Territory, together with the Districts of Columbia and Alaska, should be bona-fide residents of the Territory or district in which their duties are to be performed"

== See also ==
- Grover Cleveland 1892 presidential campaign
- List of Democratic National Conventions
- 1892 Republican National Convention

== Works cited ==
- Knoles, George (1971). The Presidential Campaign and Election of 1892. Stanford University Press. ISBN 040450969X.

| Preceded by 1888; St. Louis, Missouri | Democratic National Conventions | Succeeded by 1896; Chicago, Illinois |
