= Grover Cleveland 1884 presidential campaign =

American political campaign

Grover Cleveland for President
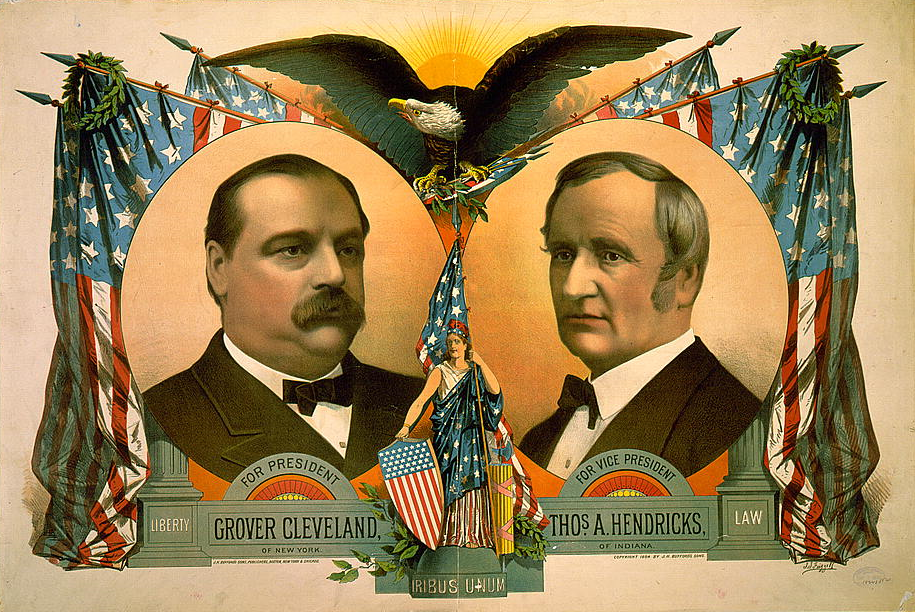
- Campaign: 1884 U.S. presidential election
- Candidate: Grover Cleveland; 17th Sheriff of Erie County (1871–1873); 35th Mayor of Buffalo (1882); 28th Governor of New York (1883–1885); Thomas A. Hendricks; U.S. House of Representative from Indiana (1851–1855); U.S. Senator from Indiana (1863–1869); 16th Governor of Indiana (1873–1877)
- Affiliation: Democratic Party
- Status: Won general election: November 4, 1884; Inaugurated: March 4, 1885

The 1884 presidential election was the first nationwide campaign in which Grover Cleveland participated and the first of two in which he emerged victorious. This election pitted Democratic Party nominee Cleveland against Republican party nominee James G. Blaine and the campaign centered on corruption, civil service reforms, and political scandals. In this election, Cleveland portrayed himself as the clean and honest candidate in contrast to Blaine, who was portrayed as corrupt.

== The nomination fight ==
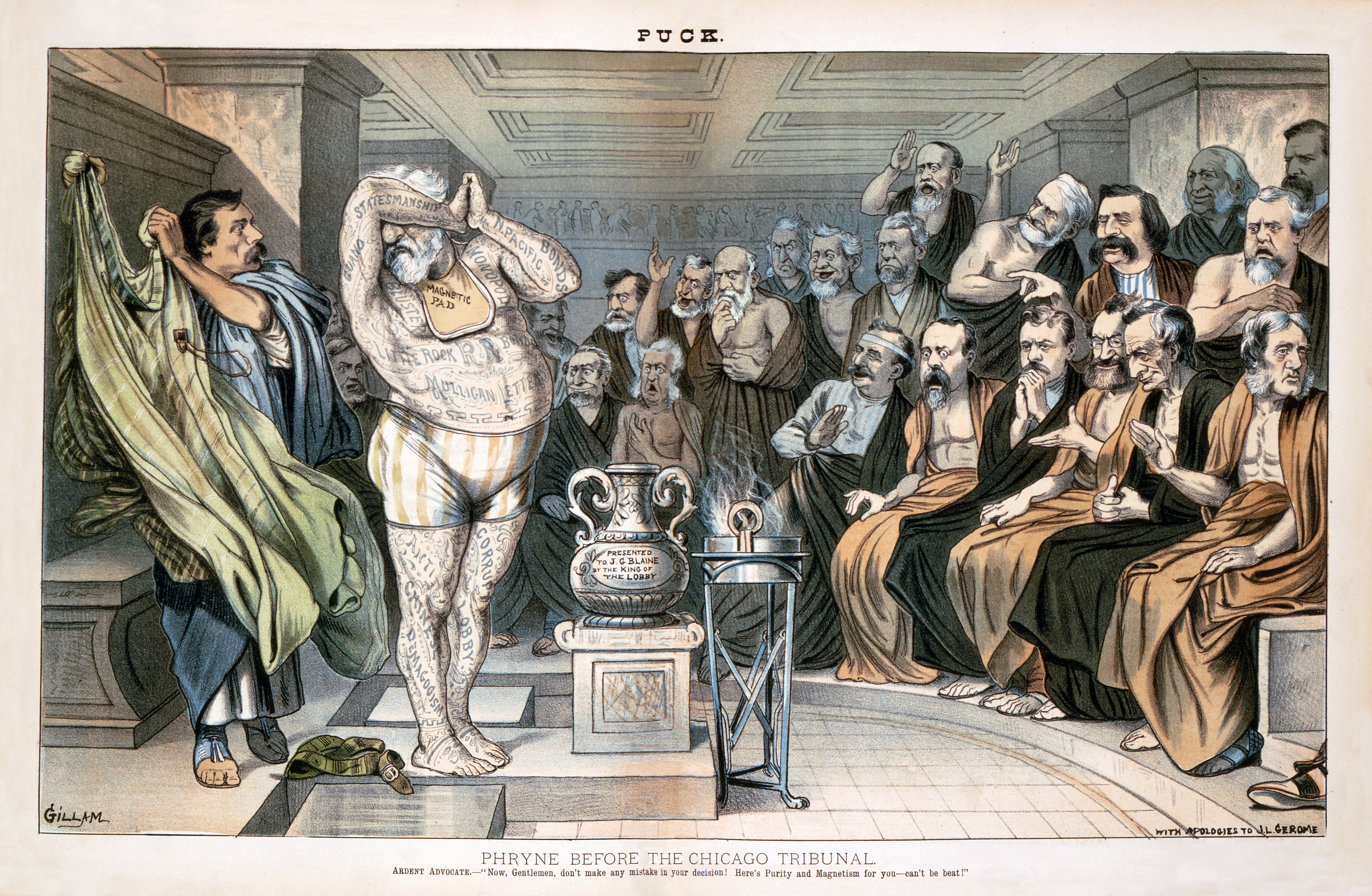
An 1884 cartoon which ridicules Blaine as the tattooed-man with many indelible scandals.

The Republican party of the early 1880s was divided into two factions: Stalwarts and Reformers. The main issue that divided the two was political patronage. In the months leading up to the 1884 Republican National Convention, James G. Blaine, a Reformer, was considered the favorite for the Republican nomination. Also contemplating a run for the party's nomination was President Chester A. Arthur. He came to recognize however, that neither faction was prepared to give him their full support. As a result, and due his poor health, Arthur made only a limited effort to secure the nomination. At the convention, Blaine defeated Arthur for the nomination on the fourth ballot. Afterward, John A. Logan was selected as Blaine's running mate on the first ballot.

1876 Democratic nominee Samuel J. Tilden was initially the 1884 front-runner for the Democrats. Due to his poor health, however, Tilden withdrew his name from consideration prior to the convention. After Tilden's withdrawal, New York Governor and former Buffalo Mayor Grover Cleveland (known as "Grover the Good") emerged as the front-runner for the Democrats. As Governor, Cleveland was notable for implementing civil service reform in New York as well as for preserving Niagara Falls as a state park. In addition, Cleveland's position on the tariff issue was unclear—thus allowing him to appeal to both high tariff supporters and low tariff supporters. Plus, the fact that he was from a swing state (New York) further strengthened Cleveland's appeal among Democrats. Finally, Cleveland won a lot of support for cutting off the patronage of the corrupt New York City political machine known as Tammany Hall while he was New York Governor.

=== Convention ===
At the convention, former congressman Daniel N. Lockwood delivered the nominating speech for Cleveland, and Chicago Mayor Carter Harrison Sr. delivered the seconding speech.

On the first ballot at the convention, Cleveland won 392 delegates to 170 delegates for his closest rival, Delaware U.S. Senator Thomas F. Bayard. Afterwards, Cleveland's campaign managers worked behind the scenes to prevent opponents of Cleveland from consolidating around any single candidate. This strategy was successful as Cleveland won the nomination with 683 delegates at the second ballot. For Vice President, Indiana U.S. Senator Thomas A. Hendricks (previously the 1876 Democratic vice presidential nominee) was chosen (as Cleveland's running mate). During the campaign, Hendricks would serve as an attack dog for Cleveland and constantly hammer the Republican ticket and Republican Party for their record, agenda, and character.

== Campaign ==
Running on a platform of honesty and reform, Cleveland was helped by the fact that many reformist Republicans—known as Mugwumps—were uncomfortable with their candidate (James G. Blaine). Specifically, the Mugwumps disliked Blaine's corruption, his imperialist foreign policy as President Garfield's Secretary of State, and his opposition to civil service reform and other reforms.

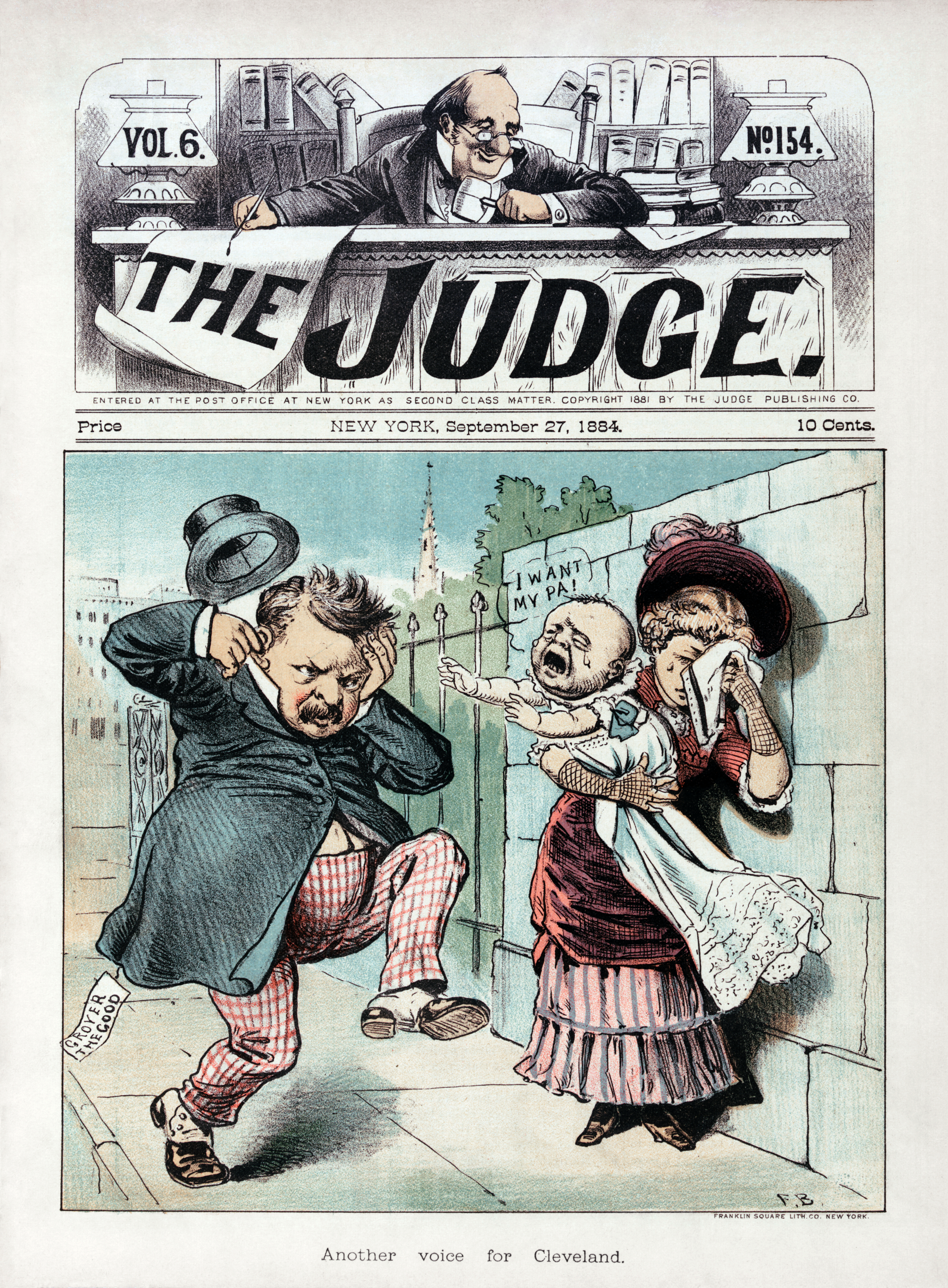
An anti-Cleveland cartoon highlights the Halpin scandal.

While a revelation by the Buffalo Evening Telegraph on July 21, 1884, about Cleveland allegedly fathering a child out of wedlock (by Maria Halpin) threatened to hurt Cleveland's campaign, Cleveland was able to take control and handle this issue by telling the truth. Specifically, Cleveland pointed out that, while he didn't think that this child was his, he nevertheless took responsibility for this child due to him being the only bachelor among his friends. Also, Cleveland pointed out that he put the child up for adoption (with this child later being adopted by a wealthy couple) once Mrs. Halpin's alcoholism threatened this child's welfare. This clarification, Cleveland's apparent honesty, and the fact that Cleveland stood his ground allowed him to successfully recover from this scandal. Maria Halpin herself (in an 1884 interview), and Charles Lachman (in a 2011 article), questioned the veracity of Cleveland's side of this story.

In spite of Blaine's conversion in support of civil service reform, the Mugwumps were unconvinced and continued to support Cleveland. Meanwhile, two events hurt Blaine's campaign in its final days. Firstly, Catholic Irish-Americans voters were alienated from Blaine when Blaine supporter and clergyman Samuel Burchard portrayed the Democrats as the party of "Rum, Romanism, and Rebellion." Secondly, Blaine attended a dinner at a New York restaurant called Delmonico's which was filled with wealthy people (such as Jay Gould and John Jacob Astor); in turn, this caused Blaine to be portrayed as a supporter of the wealthy and as uncaring about the plight and needs of the working class.

== Results ==
Due to the very close vote in New York, it was several days before the results of this election became known. Ultimately, Cleveland won New York state by 0.10% (1,149 votes)--and with it the decisive votes in the Electoral College—while winning the national popular vote by less than 0.30%. Specifically, Cleveland was helped in New York state by the support of the reformist-minded Mugwumps as well as by the fact that Prohibitionist nominee John St. John took some votes in New York from Blaine. After the election, Blaine attributed his loss in New York to the bad weather as well as to Samuel Burchard's gaffe; without these factors, Blaine believed that he would have won New York by 10,000 votes (and thus won the U.S. presidency).

Overall, 1884 was the first time in 28 years—specifically since before the American Civil War—that the Democrats won an election for the U.S. presidency.

== See also ==
- Grover Cleveland 1888 presidential campaign
- Grover Cleveland 1892 presidential campaign
