= Grover Cleveland 1892 presidential campaign =

American political campaign

Grover Cleveland for President
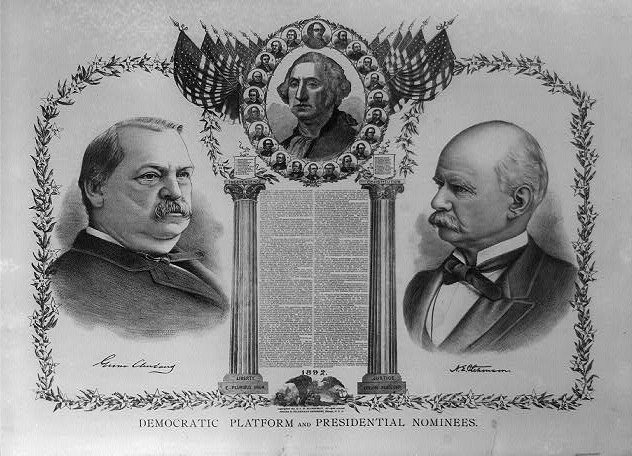
- Campaign: 1892 U.S. presidential election
- Candidate: Grover Cleveland; 22nd President of the United States (1885–1889); Adlai Stevenson I U.S. House of Representative from Illinois (1875–1877, 1879–1881)
- Affiliation: Democratic Party
- Status: Won general election: November 8, 1892; Inaugurated: March 4, 1893
- Slogan(s): Our choice: Cleve and Steve. Tariff Reform; No Force Bill.

Grover Cleveland, the 22nd President of the United States, ran a successful presidential campaign in the 1892 presidential election as a member of the Democratic Party, defeating incumbent Republican president Benjamin Harrison in a rematch from 1888 in which Cleveland had lost. The campaign was Cleveland's third and final one, and it marked the last time until Donald Trump's nomination by the Republican Party in 2024 that one of the major political parties nominated the same candidate in three consecutive presidential elections.

Contentious issues on monetary policy, especially with regards to tariff reform and bimetallism, were seen as the deciding factor in the campaign's success. The controversial McKinley Tariff, passed and signed into law by a Republican trifecta government in 1890, alienated many working-class and rural voters. Many of these voters had supported the protectionist policies of Harrison in 1888 but switched their support to Democrat Cleveland in 1892. The nomination of free silverite Illinois Representative Adlai Stevenson I as Cleveland's running mate as a means of balancing the gold standard policies of the former president created a bimetallist economic platform for the campaign that promised to restore economic stability to and appealed to voters in the largely rural Midwest, a critical region of the country whose votes had, in some way or another, proved decisive for the Republican Party's victories in its young existence.

On Election Day, the Cleveland-Stevenson ticket won decisively over the Republican Harrison-Whitelaw Reid ticket and a strong third-party challenge by the Populist Party nomination of James B. Weaver and James G. Field, who were running on an agrarian platform also designed to appeal to disenchanted rural and Midwestern Republicans. Cleveland and Stevenson won the largest margin of victory (both by Electoral College vote and popular vote) since 1872. Cleveland won the popular vote once again by a plurality, making him the first and only president to have been victorious in the popular vote three consecutive times, having also won the popular vote in his 1884 and 1888 campaigns. Cleveland's victory, following his aforementioned defeat in 1888 and a previous victory in 1884, made him the first U.S. President elected to two non-consecutive terms, a feat that would not happen again until Donald Trump won the 2024 presidential election after having previously lost in 2020 and won in 2016.

== Before the nomination ==
After losing re-election to Republican Benjamin Harrison in 1888 and leaving office in 1889, U.S. President Grover Cleveland was initially satisfied with his return to private life. However, Cleveland's views about his retirement began to change at the time of the 1890 midterm elections, in which the Democrats won huge victories at the ballot box. In addition, Cleveland disliked what he perceived to be the frequent blunders of the Harrison administration. By the time 1891 ended, Grover Cleveland decided to re-enter American political life and run again for U.S. president in the 1892 U.S. presidential election.

== Democratic nomination ==
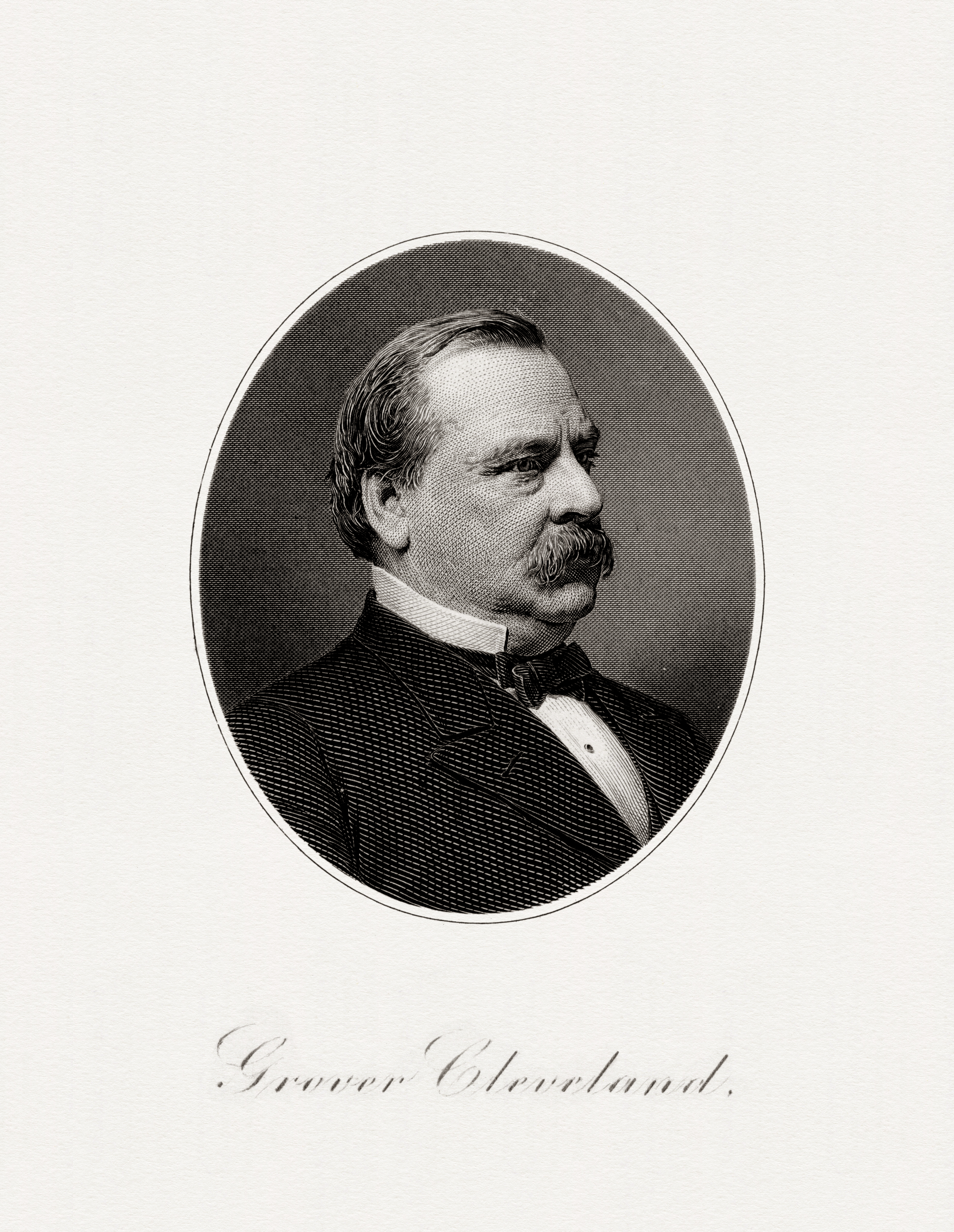
G. Cleveland, as he appears on US currency

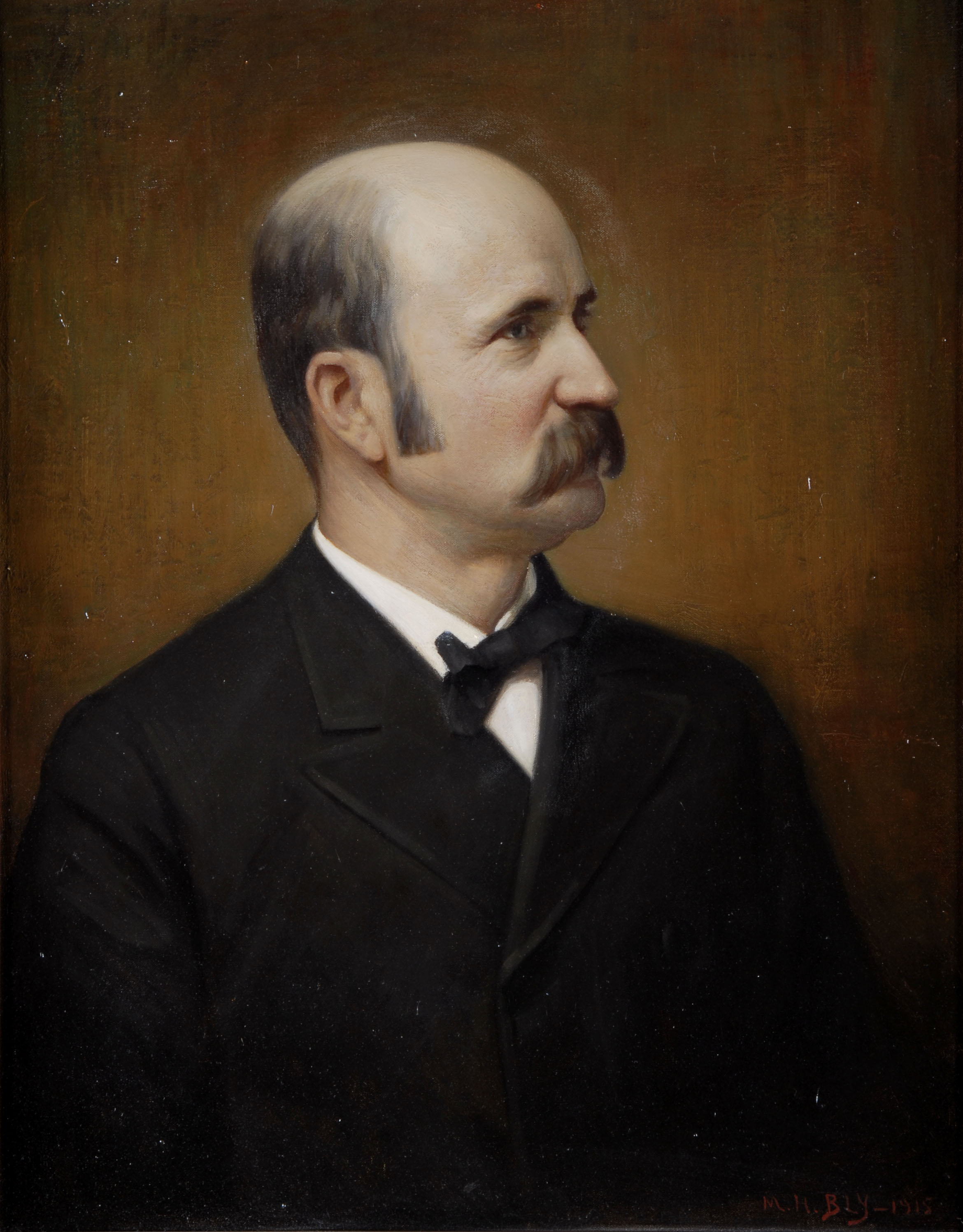
NY Governor David Hill was a competitor of Cleveland's for the 1892 Democratic nomination

The main reasons for Cleveland's return into politics were his desire to prevent New York Governor David B. Hill (a political rival of Cleveland's who also wanted the 1892 Democratic nomination) from winning the Democratic presidential nomination that year and Cleveland's staunch opposition to free silver, a prominent political issue back then. Cleveland considered Governor Hill to be a corrupt machine boss, and he staunchly believed that the Democrats should maintain their support of the gold standard. Cleveland hired former U.S. Navy Secretary William C. Whitney as his campaign manager that year. Cleveland and Whitney frequently contacted Southern politicians and newspaper editors in an attempt to get them to support Cleveland's 1892 Presidential bid. Cleveland portrayed himself as a candidate who could unify the Democratic Party (due to his status as a former president and the only Democrat elected U.S. president since the U.S. Civil War) and tried appealing to Southerners by opposing federal oversight of African American voting rights. Whitney also fundraised huge amounts of cash from wealthy bankers and businessmen in order to finance Cleveland's presidential campaign. An attempt by New York Democratic Party chairman Edward Murphy to strengthen Governor Hill's chances for the 1892 Democratic nomination by giving him all of New York's delegates backfired and ended up helping Cleveland (since most of the delegates from the other states ended up supporting him afterwards). When the 1892 Democratic National Convention convened on June 21, 1892, in Chicago, Cleveland was narrowly able to win the Democratic party nomination for U.S. president on the first ballot. Specifically, on the first ballot of the convention, Cleveland gained 617 1/3 votes, just ten more votes than the necessary two-thirds majority.

== General election ==
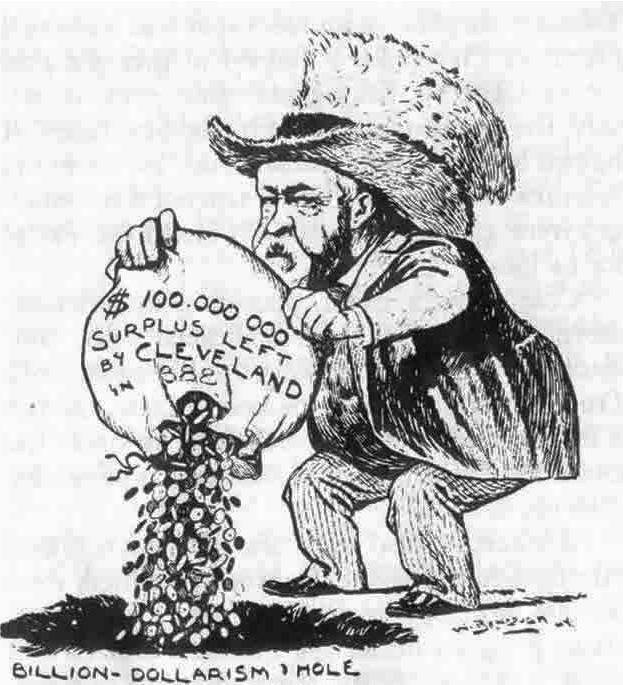
President Harrison wastes the government surplus in this Puck cartoon.

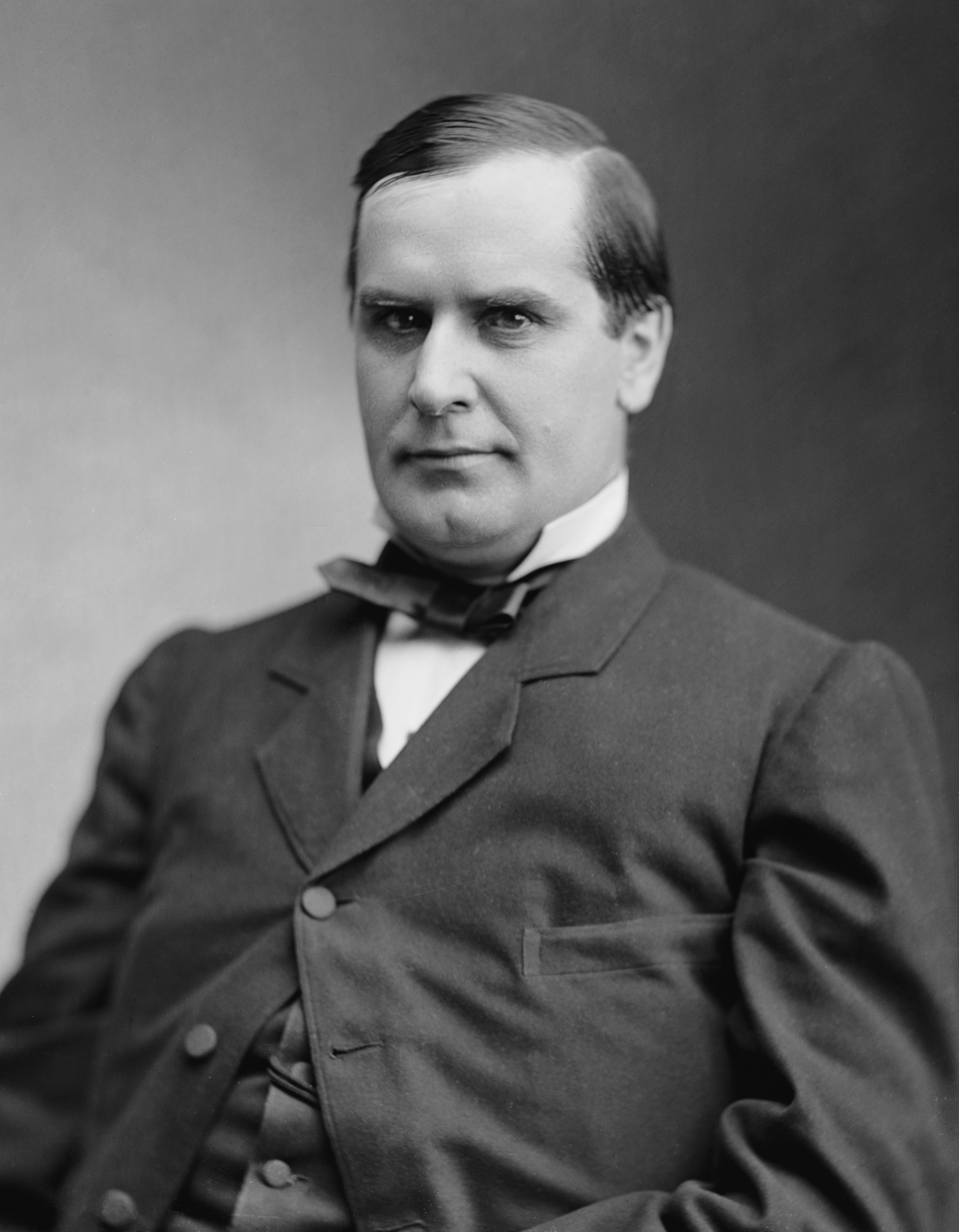
Congressman William McKinley's tariff bill was a large issue in 1892

=== Campaign ===
Not counting the anomalous 1912 election, the 1892 U.S. presidential election was the first and only U.S. presidential election where both an incumbent U.S. president and an ex-U.S. President both ran as the major party nominees. With the exception of the new pro-free silver Populist Party and its candidate James B. Weaver, the 1892 election was a rematch of the 1888 election, since Cleveland and Harrison competed against each other for the U.S. presidency back then as well. Cleveland ran on a platform of lowering tariffs (especially the McKinley Tariff), supporting the gold standard (something which he made his VP nominee Adlai Stevenson do as well) and on opposing the Republican-backed Force Bill. In addition, the Democrats criticized the Republicans for causing the Homestead Strike to occur due to their protectionist policies. Breaking tradition, Cleveland delivered his acceptance speech for the Democratic nomination in front of 20,000 supporters at New York City’s Madison Square Garden. Cleveland did not actively campaign much (partially due to U.S. First Lady Caroline Harrison's battle with tuberculosis throughout the 1892 campaign season), but his vice presidential nominee Adlai Stevenson of Illinois heavily campaigned for the Democratic ticket. Cleveland's campaign did spend nearly $2,350,000 (or $46,300,000 in 2002 dollars) on his campaign, a greater amount than incumbent Republican U.S. President Benjamin Harrison spent on his re-election campaign. Whitney (Cleveland's campaign manager) eventually managed to get New York Governor David B. Hill and the Tammany Hall political machine to reluctantly support Cleveland in 1892, which might have helped Cleveland narrowly win his home state of New York.

The campaign took a somber turn in the final weeks when Caroline Harrison, the wife of Benjamin Harrison, died after a period of prolonged illness on October 25, 1892. Out of respect, all major party candidates ceased campaigning, and Election Day was described by Cleveland biographer Allan Nevins as "the cleanest, quietest, and most creditable in the memory of the post-war generation."

=== Results ===
Electoral College results from the 1892 presidential election.

On Election Day, the Cleveland-Stevenson ticket decisively defeated the Republican and Populist opposition. In the popular vote, Cleveland again won a plurality, this time by a margin of 46% to 43% against the Harrison-Reid ticket, with the Populist Weaver-Field ticket coming a distant third with 8.6%. The 3% margin of victory was the largest popular vote margin in twenty years.

The bimetallist economic platform of the Democratic Party ticket proved decisive in Cleveland's victory, which helped to win over many disgruntled rural Republicans that had been alienated by the McKinley Tariff. Many states throughout the reliably Republican Midwest saw considerably thinner margins of victory for Harrison, with two states, Wisconsin and Illinois, even voting Democratic for the first time since 1852 and 1856, respectively. Owing to these inroads in staunchly Republican bastions, Cleveland won almost two thirds of the Electoral College vote, winning by a 277–145–22 margin against the Republican and Populist parties, respectively. Cleveland retained all of the states that he won in 1884 in addition to winning aforementioned Wisconsin and Illinois along with California. Cleveland also managed to flip Harrison's home state of Indiana and his home state of New York back to the Democratic column, having lost them in 1888 after winning both in 1884. Due to winning in 1892, Grover Cleveland became the first former U.S. president to be elected U.S. president again. No other former U.S. president held this distinction until Donald Trump won a non-consecutive second term in 2024.

== See also ==
- Grover Cleveland 1884 presidential campaign
- Grover Cleveland 1888 presidential campaign
